= Solar eclipse of August 21, 2017 =

Total eclipse visible from the mainland US

- Total eclipse
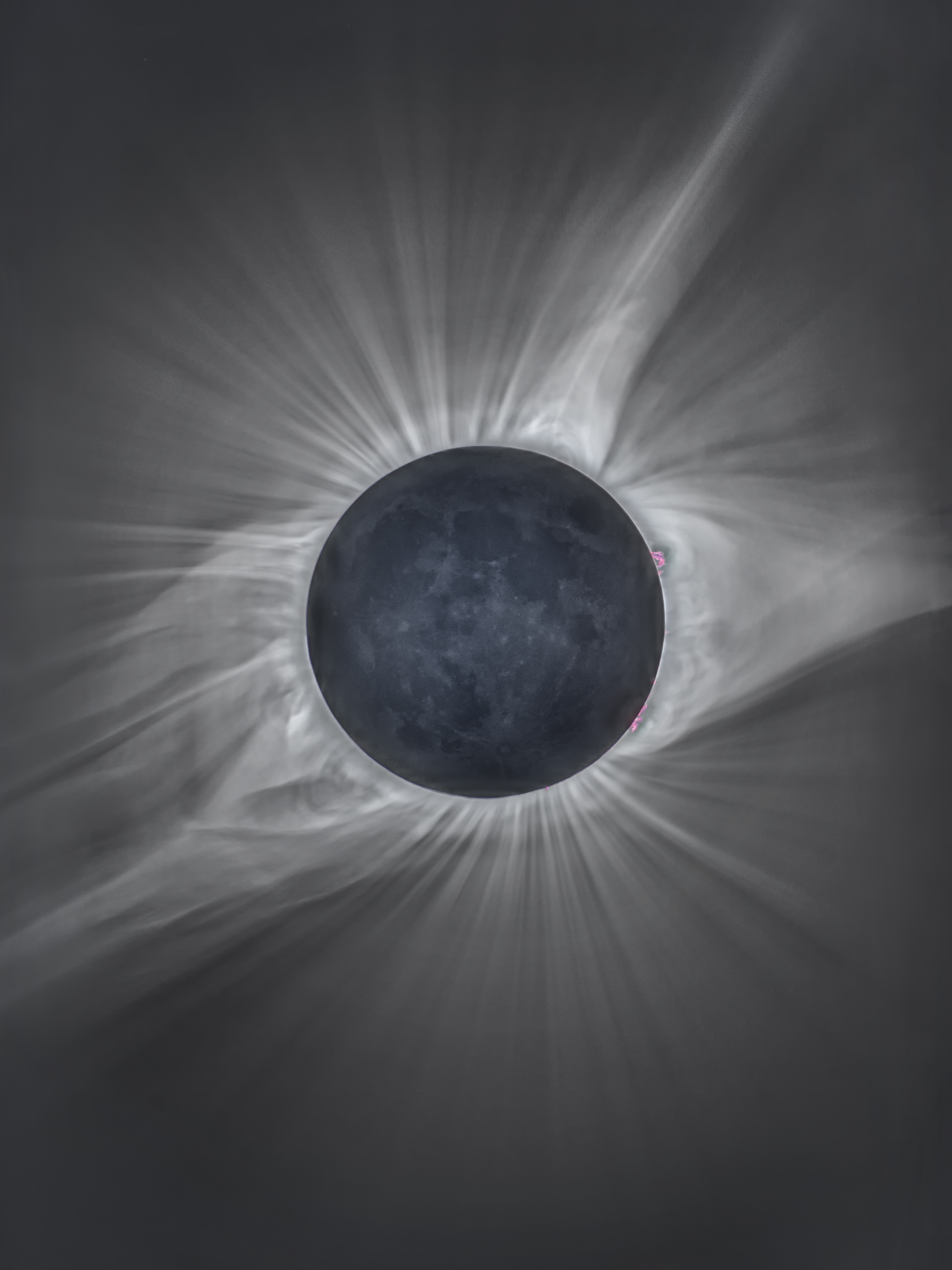
- The eclipse from outside Crowheart, Wyoming. This image used exposure bracketing to show both the Sun's corona and surface features of the Moon itself.

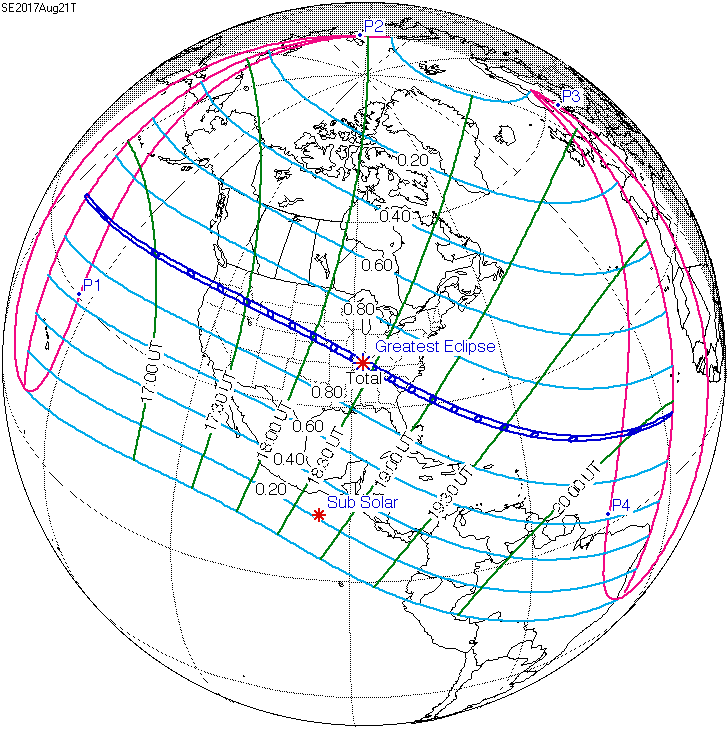
- Map
- Gamma: 0.4367
- Magnitude: 1.0306

Maximum eclipse
- Duration: 160 s (2 min 40 s)
- Coordinates: 37°N 87.7°W
- Max. width of band: 115 km (71 mi)

Times (UTC)
- (P1) Partial begin: 15:46:48
- (U1) Total begin: 16:48:32
- Greatest eclipse: 18:26:40
- (U4) Total end: 20:01:35
- (P4) Partial end: 21:04:19

References
- Saros: 145 (22 of 77)
- Catalog # (SE5000): 9546

A total solar eclipse, dubbed the "Great American Eclipse" by some media, occurred on Monday, August 21, 2017. It was visible within a band that spanned the contiguous United States from the Pacific to the Atlantic coasts. It was also visible as a partial solar eclipse from as far north as Nunavut in northern Canada to as far south as northern South America. In northwestern Europe and Africa, it was partially visible in the late evening. In northeastern Asia, it was partially visible at sunrise.

Prior to this event, no solar eclipse had been visible across the entirety of the United States since June 8, 1918; not since the February 1979 eclipse had a total eclipse been visible from anywhere in the contiguous United States. The path of totality touched 14 states, and the rest of the U.S. had a partial eclipse. The area of the path of totality was about 16 percent of the area of the United States, with most of this area over the ocean, not land. The event's shadow began to cover land on the Oregon coast as a partial eclipse at 4:05 p.m. UTC (9:05 a.m. PDT), with the total eclipse beginning there at 5:16 p.m. UTC (10:16 a.m. PDT); the total eclipse's land coverage ended along the South Carolina coast at about 6:44 p.m. UTC (2:44 p.m. EDT). Visibility as a partial eclipse in Honolulu, Hawaii began with sunrise at 4:20 p.m. UTC (6:20 a.m. HST) and ended by 5:25 p.m. UTC (7:25 a.m. HST).

This total solar eclipse marked the first such event in the smartphone and social media era in the United States. Information, personal communication, and photography were widely available as never before. The event was received with much enthusiasm across the nation; people gathered outside their homes to watch it, and many parties were set up in the path of the eclipse. Many people left their homes and traveled hundreds of miles just to get a glimpse of totality. Marriage proposals were timed to coincide with the eclipse, as was at least one wedding. Logistical problems arose with the influx of visitors, especially for smaller communities. The sale of counterfeit eclipse glasses was also anticipated to be a hazard for eye injuries.

The next solar eclipse that crossed the United States occurred on October 14, 2023 (annular eclipse), and the next total solar eclipse on April 8, 2024 (15 states). Future solar eclipses that will be visible from the United States will occur on March 30, 2033, which will pass over Alaska. The next total eclipses in the contiguous United States will be on August 23, 2044 (3 states) and on August 12, 2045 (13 states) (Saros 136, Descending Node). Annular solar eclipses—wherein the Moon appears smaller than the Sun—occurred on October 14, 2023 (9 states) and will occur on June 11, 2048 (10 states) (Saros 128, Descending Node).

== Visibility ==
Animation of the eclipse shadow: The dot in the center represents the path of totality.

The total eclipse occurred at the Moon's ascending node of orbit and had a magnitude of 1.0306. Occurring about 3.2 days after perigee (on August 18, 2017, at 14:20 UTC), the Moon's apparent diameter was larger during this eclipse. It was visible within a narrow corridor 70 miles (110 km) wide, crossing 14 of the contiguous United States: Oregon, Idaho, Montana, Wyoming, Nebraska, Kansas, Iowa, Missouri, Illinois, Kentucky, Tennessee, Georgia, North Carolina, and South Carolina. It was first seen from land in the U.S. shortly after 10:15 am PDT (17:15 UTC) at Oregon's Pacific coast, and then it progressed eastward through Salem, Oregon; Idaho Falls, Idaho; Casper, Wyoming; Lincoln, Nebraska; Kansas City, Missouri; St. Louis, Missouri; Hopkinsville, Kentucky; and Nashville, Tennessee; before reaching Columbia, South Carolina about 2:41 pm; and finally Charleston, South Carolina. A partial eclipse was seen for a greater time period, beginning shortly after 9:00 am PDT along the Pacific Coast of Oregon. Weather forecasts predicted clear skies in Western U.S. and some Eastern states, but clouds in the Midwest and East Coast.

The longest ground duration of totality was 2 minutes 41.6 seconds at about 37°35′0″N 89°7′0″W in Giant City State Park, just south of Carbondale, Illinois, and the greatest extent (width) was at 36°58′0″N 87°40′18″W near the village of Cerulean, Kentucky, located in between Hopkinsville and Princeton. This was the first total solar eclipse visible from the Southeastern United States since the solar eclipse of March 7, 1970. Two NASA WB-57Fs flew above the clouds, prolonging the observation time spent in the umbra. A partial solar eclipse was seen from the much broader path of the Moon's penumbra, including all of North America, particularly areas just south of the totality pass, where the eclipse lasted about 3–5 hours, Hawaii, Central America, the Caribbean, northern South America, Western Europe, and some of West Africa and Northeast Asia.

View of the lunar shadow tracking across Earth from the Deep Space Climate Observatory satellite

At one location in Wyoming, a small group of astronomers used telescopic lenses to photograph the Sun as it was in partial eclipse, while the International Space Station was also seen to briefly transit the Sun. Similar images were captured by NASA from a location in Washington. (See Gallery – partial eclipse section).

== Other celestial bodies ==
During the eclipse for a long span of its path of totality, several bright stars and four planets were visible. The star system Regulus was almost in conjunction with the Sun. Mars was 8° to the right, and Venus 34° right. Mercury was 10° left, and Jupiter 51° left.

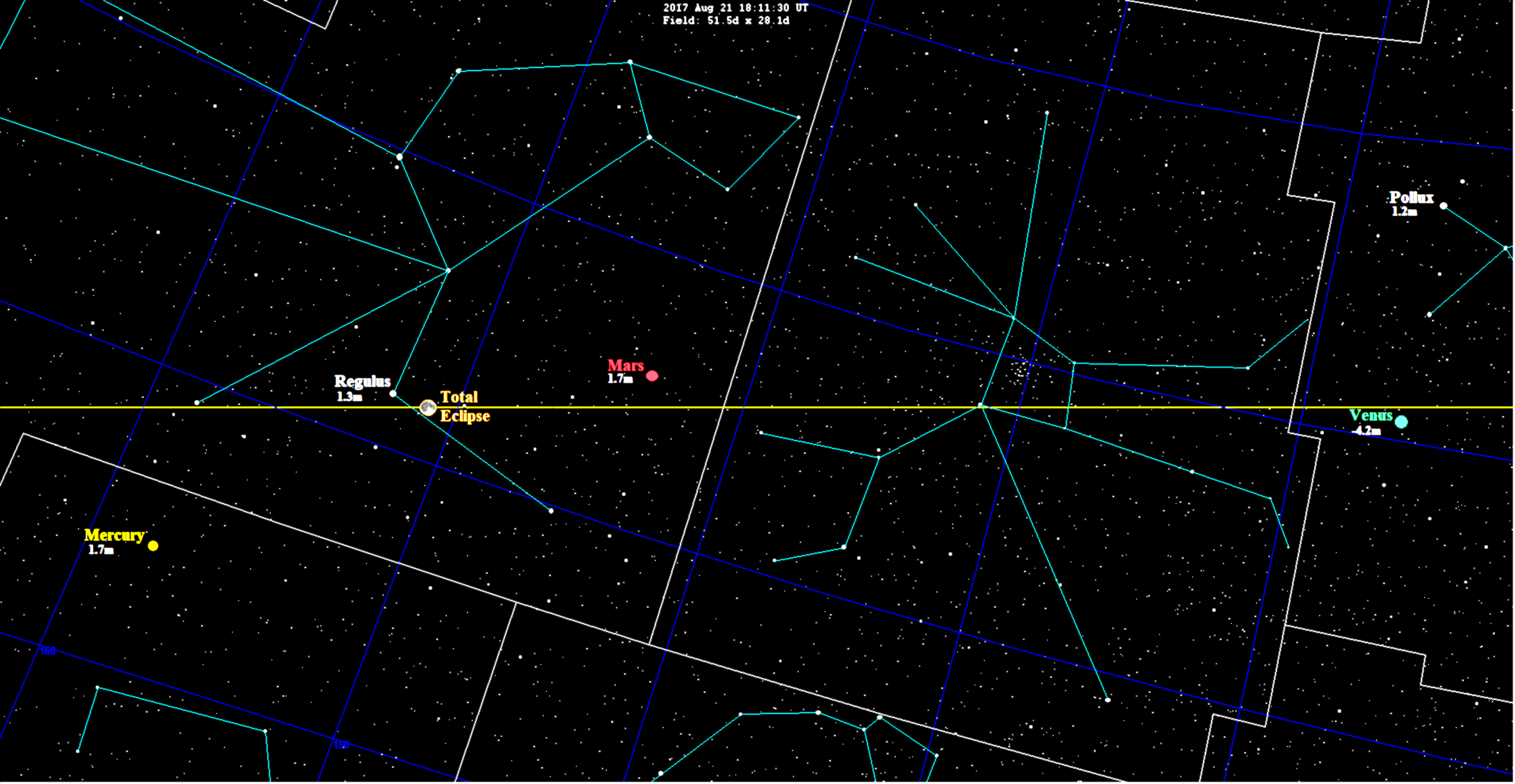
During totality, stars and four planets were visible.

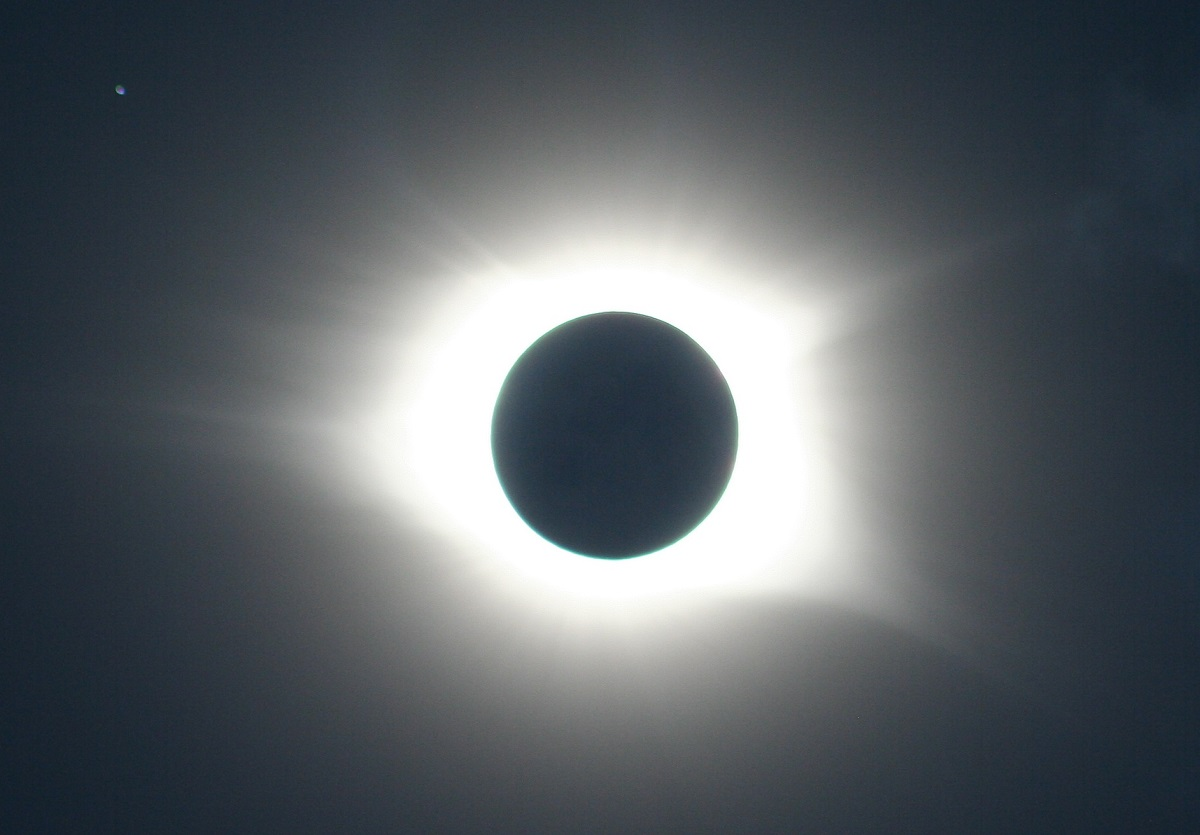
Solar eclipse and star system Regulus (upper left) viewed from Cullowhee, North Carolina

== Other eclipses over the United States ==
This was the first total solar eclipse visible from the United States since that of July 11, 1991—which was seen only from part of Hawaii—and the first visible from the contiguous United States since 1979. An eclipse of comparable length (up to 3 minutes, 8 seconds, with the longest eclipse being 6 minutes and 54 seconds) occurred over the contiguous United States on March 7, 1970 along the southern portions of the Eastern Seaboard, from Florida to Virginia.

The path of totality of the solar eclipse of February 26, 1979 crossed only the states of Washington, Oregon, Idaho, Montana, and North Dakota. Many enthusiasts traveled to the Pacific Northwest to view the eclipse, since it would be the last chance to view such an eclipse in the contiguous United States for almost four decades.

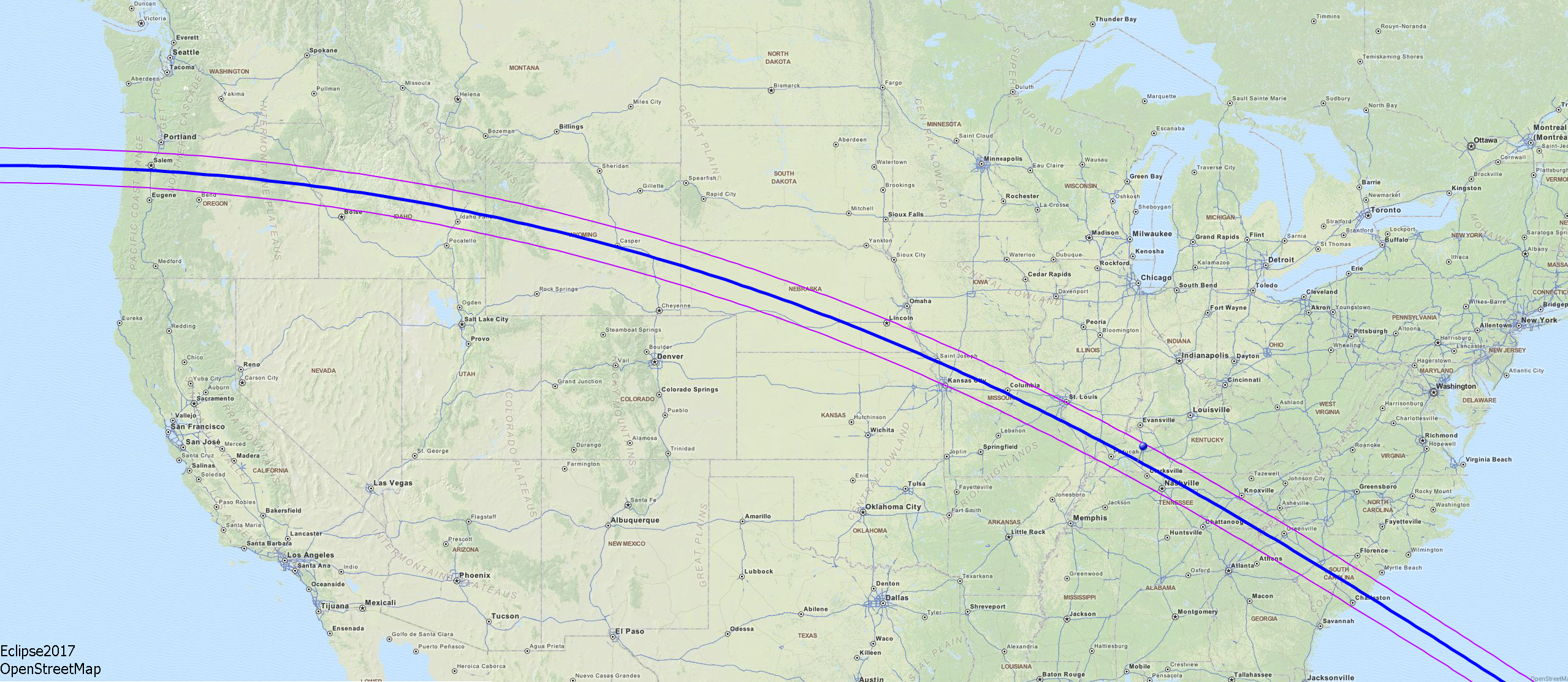
The path of totality across the United States

The August 2017 eclipse was the first with a path of totality crossing the Pacific and Atlantic coasts of the U.S. since the solar eclipse of 1918. Also, its path of totality made landfall exclusively within the United States, making it the first such eclipse since the country's declaration of independence in 1776. Prior to this, the path of totality of the eclipse of June 13, 1257, was the last to make landfall exclusively on lands currently part of the United States.

The path of the solar eclipse of April 8, 2024 crossed the path of the August 2017 eclipse, with the intersection occurring in southern Illinois in Makanda Township at Cedar Lake, just south of Carbondale. An area of about 9,000 square miles (23,000 km^{2}), including the cities of Makanda, Carbondale, Cape Girardeau, Missouri, and Paducah, Kentucky, thus experienced two total solar eclipses within a span of less than seven years. This occurrence is considered to be unusual, since the average interval for any given spot on Earth observing a total solar eclipse is about once every 375 years.

The solar eclipse of August 12, 2045, will have a very similar path of totality over the U.S. to that of the 2017 eclipse: about 400 km (250 mi) to the southwest, also crossing the Pacific and Atlantic coasts of the country; however, totality will be more than twice as long, and it will be seen in other countries besides the United States.

== Eclipse timing ==
=== Places experiencing total eclipse ===
Solar Eclipse of August 21, 2017 (Local Times)
U.S. state	City or place	Start of partial eclipse	Start of total eclipse	Maximum eclipse	End of total eclipse	End of partial eclipse	Duration of totality (min:s)	Duration of eclipse (hr:min)	Maximum magnitude
Oregon	Salem	09:05:14	10:17:09	10:18:07	10:19:04	11:37:40	1:55	2:32	1.0097
Oregon	Ontario	10:09:55	11:25:22	11:26:04	11:26:47	12:48:27	1:25	2:39	1.0037
Wyoming	Jackson	10:16:32	11:34:44	11:35:51	11:36:59	13:00:19	2:15	2:44	1.0109
Nebraska	Harrison	10:25:34	11:47:21	11:48:11	11:49:01	13:14:02	1:40	2:48	1.0042
Nebraska	Scottsbluff	10:25:37	11:48:00	11:48:50	11:49:40	13:15:16	1:40	2:50	1.004
Nebraska	North Platte	11:30:04	12:53:51	12:54:45	12:55:38	14:21:37	1:47	2:52	1.0044
Nebraska	Kearney	11:32:50	12:57:23	12:58:19	12:59:16	14:25:21	1:53	2:53	1.005
Nebraska	Fairbury	11:36:10	13:01:32	13:02:31	13:03:30	14:29:37	1:58	2:53	1.0054
Nebraska	Lincoln	11:37:04	13:02:20	13:03:05	13:03:50	14:29:40	1:30	2:53	1.003
Missouri	St. Joseph	11:40:27	13:06:14	13:07:34	13:08:54	14:34:25	2:40	2:54	1.0153
Kansas	Kansas City	11:40:59	13:08:28	13:08:35	13:08:42	14:35:45	0:14	2:55	1.0003
Missouri	Kansas City	11:41:05	13:08:31	13:08:41	13:08:51	14:35:51	0:20	2:55	1.0004
Missouri	Independence	11:41:24	13:08:29	13:09:02	13:09:36	14:36:10	1:07	2:55	1.0017
Missouri	Columbia	11:45:27	13:12:10	13:13:29	13:14:48	14:40:05	2:38	2:55	1.0131
Missouri	Jefferson City	11:45:53	13:12:56	13:14:10	13:15:25	14:40:56	2:29	2:55	1.0098
Illinois	Carbondale	11:52:12	13:19:54	13:21:14	13:22:33	14:47:20	2:39	2:55	1.0135
Kentucky	Paducah	11:53:50	13:22:05	13:23:16	13:24:26	14:49:24	2:21	2:56	1.0081
Tennessee	Clarksville	11:56:48	13:25:23	13:26:32	13:27:40	14:52:21	2:17	2:56	1.0075
Kentucky	Bowling Green	11:58:27	13:27:18	13:27:48	13:28:17	14:53:00	0:59	2:55	1.0014
Tennessee	Nashville	11:58:18	13:27:16	13:28:13	13:29:10	14:53:54	1:54	2:56	1.0047
Tennessee	Murfreesboro	11:59:21	13:29:01	13:29:25	13:29:49	14:55:02	0:48	2:56	1.001
Tennessee	Cookeville	12:01:03	13:29:32	13:30:49	13:32:07	14:55:53	2:35	2:55	1.0118
Tennessee	Cleveland	13:03:13	14:33:01	14:33:30	14:33:59	15:58:35	0:58	2:55	1.0013
North Carolina	Brevard	13:07:53	14:37:05	14:37:41	14:38:18	16:01:37	1:13	2:54	1.0021
South Carolina	Anderson	13:08:45	14:37:40	14:38:57	14:40:14	16:03:02	2:34	2:54	1.0118
South Carolina	Taylors	13:09:09	14:38:07	14:39:00	14:39:54	16:02:47	1:47	2:54	1.0043
South Carolina	Columbia	13:12:53	14:41:39	14:42:54	14:44:10	16:06:12	2:31	2:53	1.0117
South Carolina	Kingstree	13:15:58	14:44:52	14:45:46	14:46:39	16:08:24	1:47	2:52	1.0046
South Carolina	Summerville	13:15:54	14:45:07	14:46:08	14:47:09	16:09:07	2:02	2:53	1.0059
South Carolina	Charleston	13:16:43	14:46:12	14:46:57	14:47:43	16:09:50	1:31	2:53	1.0032

=== Places experiencing partial eclipse ===
Solar Eclipse of August 21, 2017 (Local Times)
Country or territory	City or place	Start of partial eclipse	Maximum eclipse	End of partial eclipse	Duration of eclipse (hr:min)	Maximum coverage
Canada	Vancouver	09:09:59	10:20:59	11:37:31	2:28	85.97%
Canada	Toronto	13:10:25	14:31:53	15:49:06	2:39	70.67%
Canada	Montreal	13:21:41	14:38:16	15:50:18	2:29	58.38%
United States	Washington, D.C.	13:17:38	14:42:37	16:01:30	2:44	81.15%
Cuba	Havana	13:27:07	14:58:12	16:20:24	2:53	65.75%
Bahamas	Nassau	13:34:30	15:05:03	16:25:47	2:51	81.19%
Bermuda	Hamilton	14:51:07	16:12:33	17:25:14	2:34	81.21%
Jamaica	Kingston	12:51:30	14:18:25	15:34:55	2:43	59.44%
Turks and Caicos Islands	Cockburn Town	13:55:17	15:22:08	16:38:10	2:43	80.77%
Haiti	Port-au-Prince	13:59:12	15:25:10	16:40:18	2:41	69.30%
Dominican Republic	Santo Domingo	14:04:09	15:29:02	16:43:00	2:39	73.31%
Puerto Rico	San Juan	14:11:28	15:34:20	16:46:26	2:35	79.93%
United States Virgin Islands	Cruz Bay	14:14:11	15:36:13	16:47:35	2:33	81.71%
British Virgin Islands	Road Town	14:14:19	15:36:17	16:47:36	2:33	82.30%
British Virgin Islands	Spanish Town	14:14:36	15:36:29	16:47:42	2:33	82.69%
Anguilla	The Valley	14:17:30	15:38:27	16:48:53	2:31	84.19%
Saint Martin	Marigot	14:17:47	15:38:40	16:49:03	2:31	83.67%
Sint Maarten	Philipsburg	14:17:55	15:38:47	16:49:07	2:31	83.61%
Caribbean Netherlands	The Bottom	14:18:22	15:39:10	16:49:27	2:31	81.98%
Saint Barthélemy	Gustavia	14:18:32	15:39:12	16:49:24	2:31	83.50%
Saint Kitts and Nevis	Basseterre	14:19:57	15:40:17	16:50:09	2:30	81.77%
Antigua and Barbuda	St. John's	14:21:48	15:41:31	16:50:52	2:29	82.60%
Montserrat	Brades	14:21:50	15:41:37	16:51:01	2:29	80.96%
Guadeloupe	Basse-Terre	14:24:13	15:43:19	16:52:08	2:28	79.15%
Dominica	Roseau	14:26:11	15:44:43	16:53:02	2:27	77.41%
Venezuela	Caracas	14:28:38	15:45:26	16:52:23	2:24	52.91%
Martinique	Fort-de-France	14:28:06	15:46:02	16:53:52	2:26	75.64%
Saint Lucia	Castries	14:29:27	15:46:59	16:54:27	2:25	73.81%
Barbados	Bridgetown	14:33:21	15:49:33	16:55:57	2:23	72.94%
Cape Verde	Praia	18:00:27	18:51:05	18:53:20 (sunset)	0:53	79.56%

== Total eclipse viewing events ==
=== Oregon ===
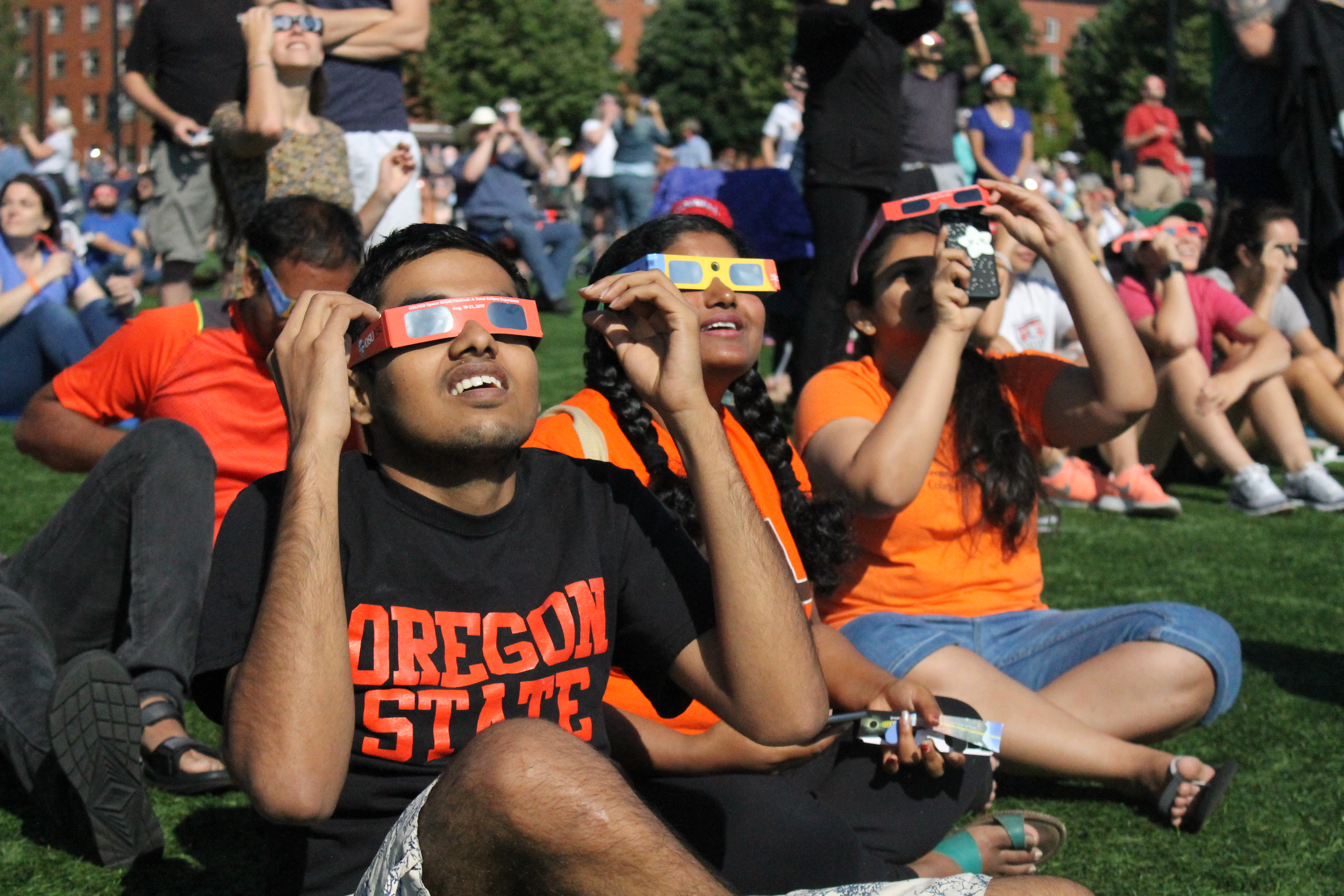
Viewing the eclipse at Oregon State University in Corvallis

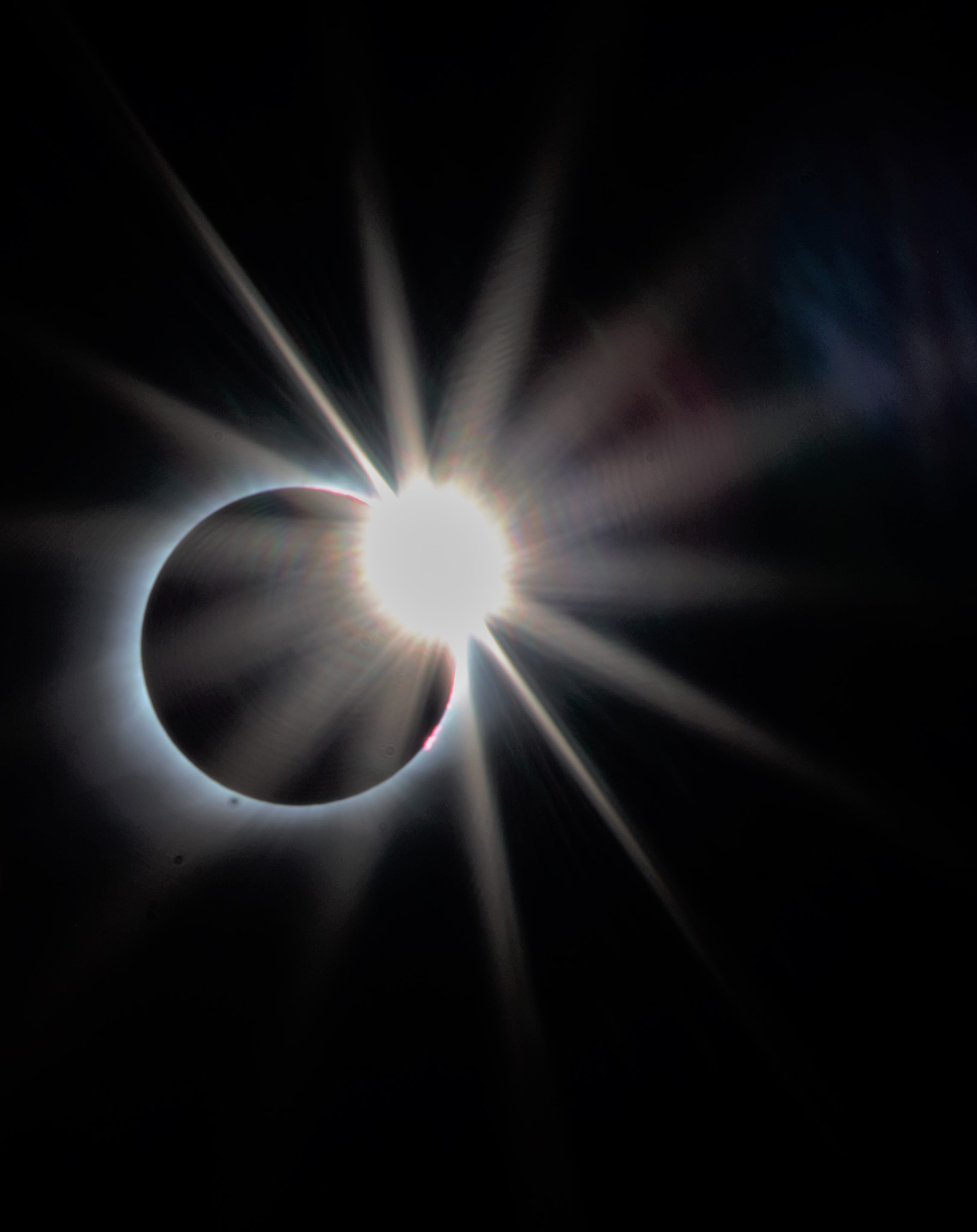
Diamond ring effect and some prominences at the end of totality, Polk County Fairgrounds, Rickreall, Oregon

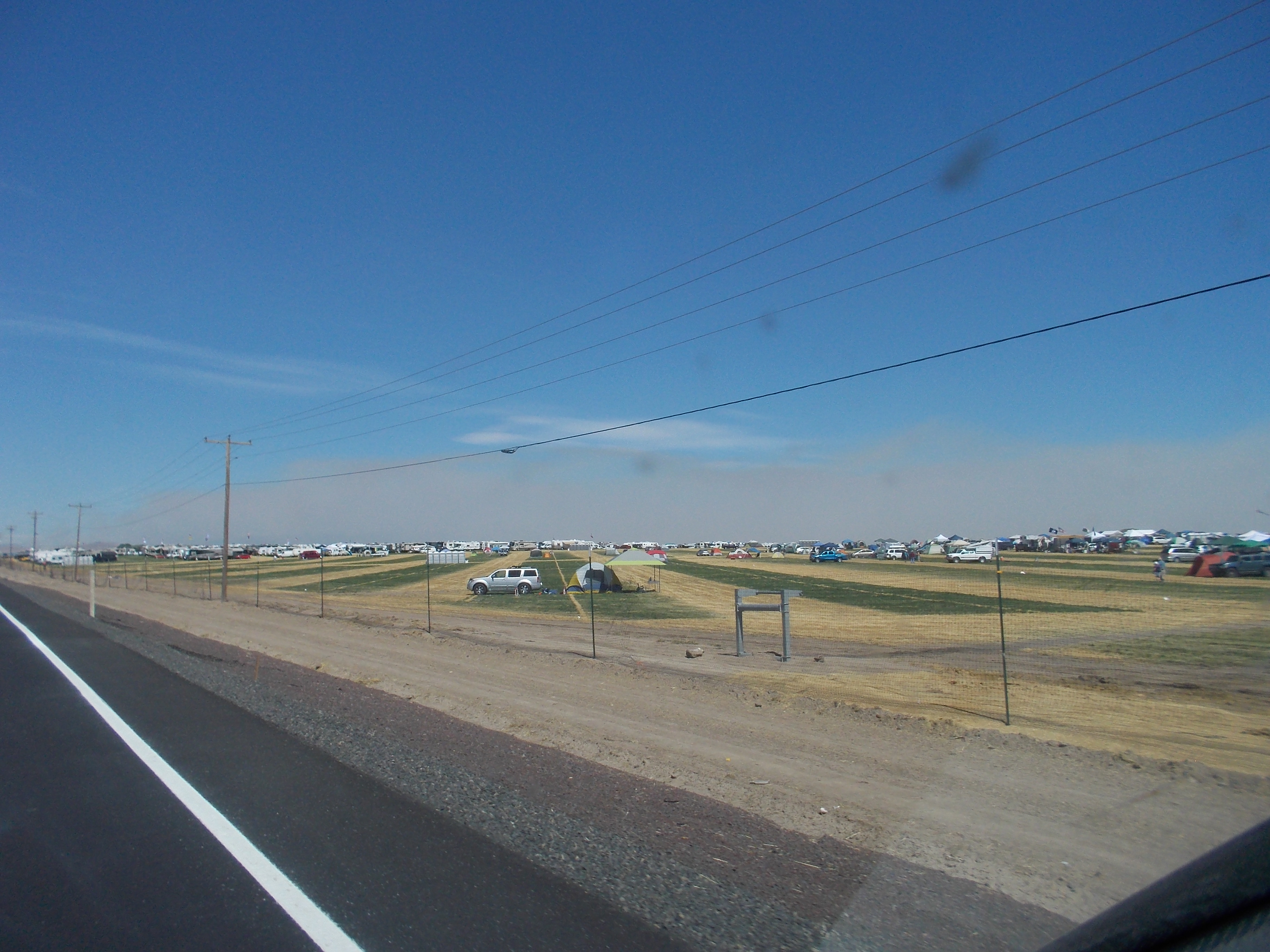
Campers on a field near Madras, Oregon, three days before the eclipse

- Corvallis – The Corvallis campus of Oregon State University hosted "OSU150 Space Grant Festival: A Total Eclipse Experience", a weekend-long celebration of the eclipse. A watch party was also hosted on campus the day of the eclipse.
- Huntington – Historic Farewell Bend State Recreation Area hosted the RASC: Yukon Centre (Yukon Astronomical Society) and the RASC: Okanagan Centre. Solar viewing and presentations on the eclipse were given along with a dark-sky presentation.
- Keizer – The Salem-Keizer Volcanoes, a Class A baseball team, played a morning game against the visiting Hillsboro Hops that featured the first ever "eclipse delay" in baseball history.
- Madras – The city sponsored a four-day Solarfest at two locations.
- Ontario – Treasure Valley Community College hosted an eclipse viewing event.
- Prineville – Symbiosis Gathering hosted a seven-day eclipse festival which included rave-style music dubbed "Oregon Eclipse".
- Rickreall – The Polk County Fairgrounds organized a series of events and an eclipse gathering.
- Salem – The Oregon Museum of Science and Industry hosted an event at the Oregon State Fairgrounds.

=== Idaho ===
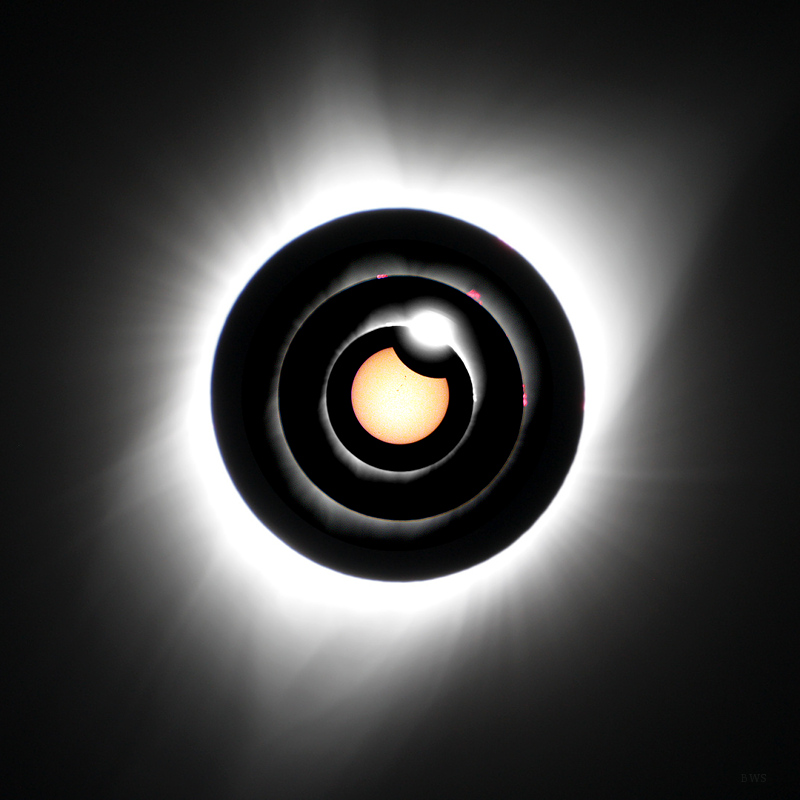
Four image composite with corona, prominences, diamond ring and partial eclipse with sunspots from north of Boise, Idaho

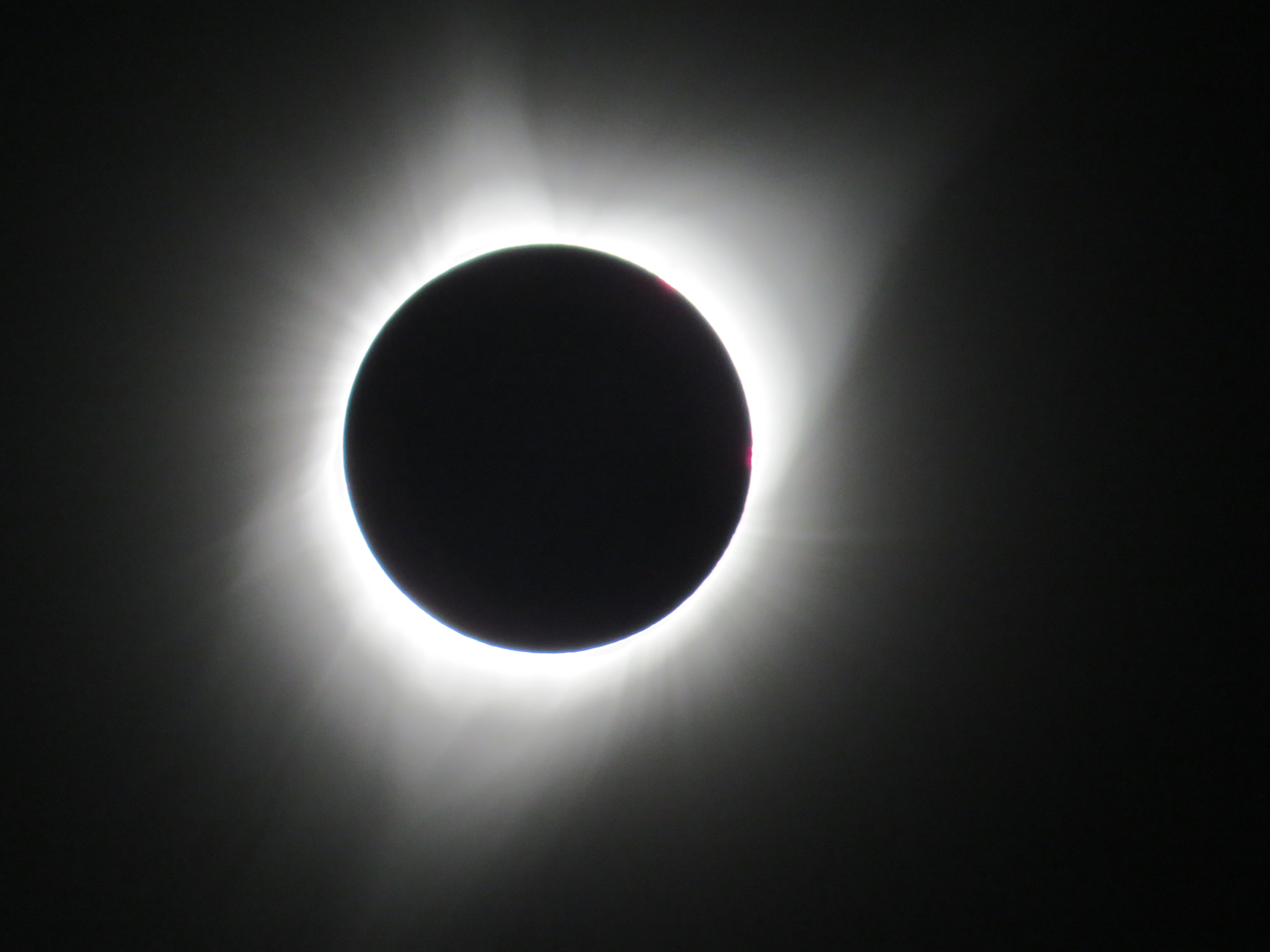
Total eclipse from Weiser, Idaho

- Arco – High altitude balloon launches by the USC Astronautical Engineering department and NASA.
- Craters of the Moon – The National Monument and Preserve hosted NASA presentations, evening star parties hosted by the Idaho Falls Astronomical Society, and presentations by the New Mexico Chapter of the Charlie Bates Solar Astronomy Project.
- Idaho Falls – Free entertainment and educational seminars and an eclipse-watching event at the Museum of Idaho (an official NASA viewing site) and elsewhere, and a free eclipse-watching event at Melaleuca Field.
- Rexburg – Brigham Young University Idaho offered a series of eclipse-related educational events.
- Weiser – The city sponsored a five-day festival prior to the eclipse.

=== Wyoming ===
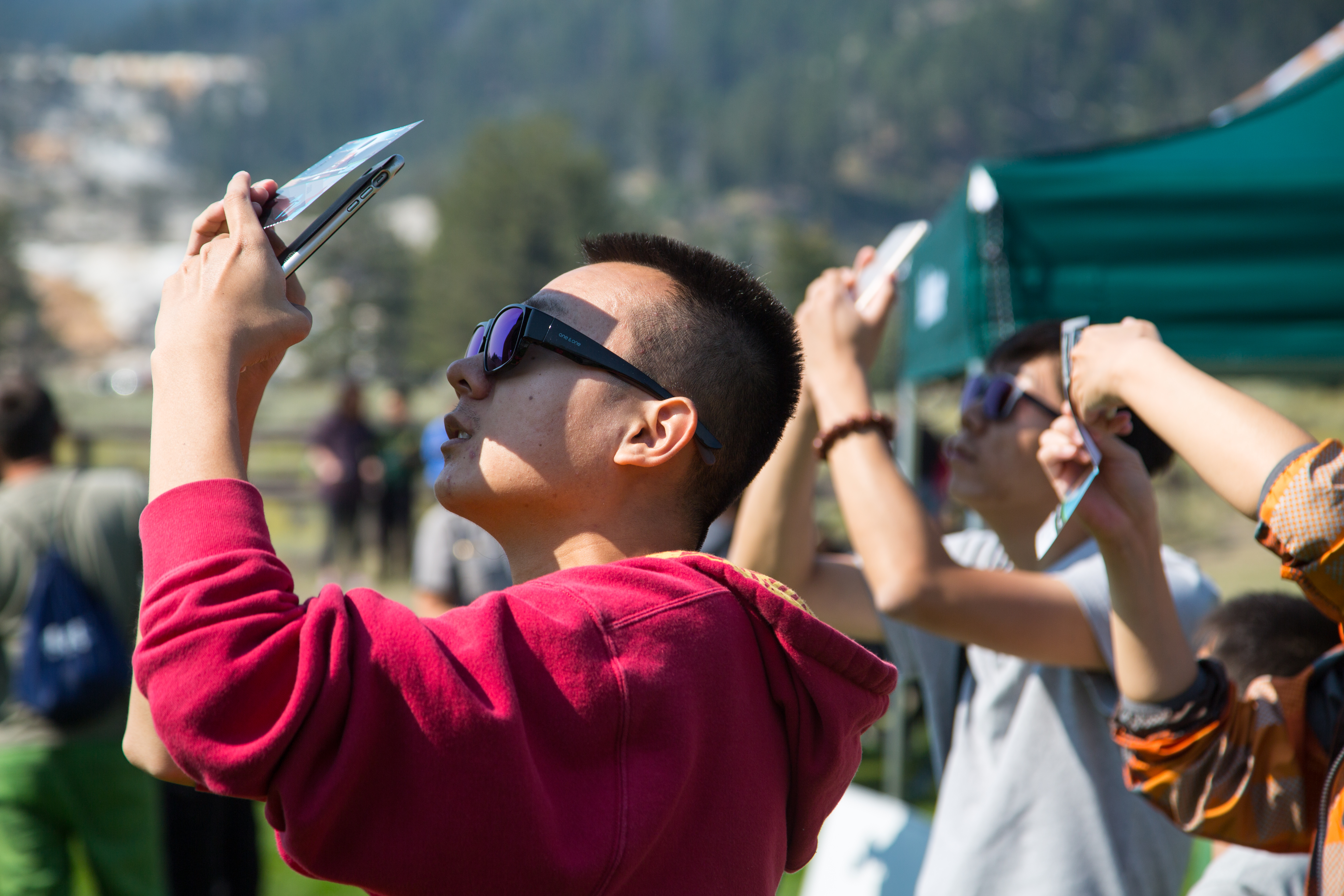
People watching and photographing the eclipse in Yellowstone National Park

- Crowheart – The YouTube channel Smarter Every Day, collaborating with photographer Trevor Mahlmann, observed and captured a simultaneous transit of the International Space Station during the partial phase of the eclipse.
- Casper – The Astronomical League, an alliance of amateur astronomy clubs, held its annual Astrocon conference, and there were other public events, called Wyoming Eclipse Festival 2017.
- Fort Laramie – Fort Laramie held an eclipse viewing event, which included a Special "Great American Eclipse" Program.
- Riverton – The biggest Polish expedition conducted as the Great Expedition of Polish Society of Amateur Astronomers was flocked between Riverton and Shoshoni in the central line of totality.

=== Nebraska ===
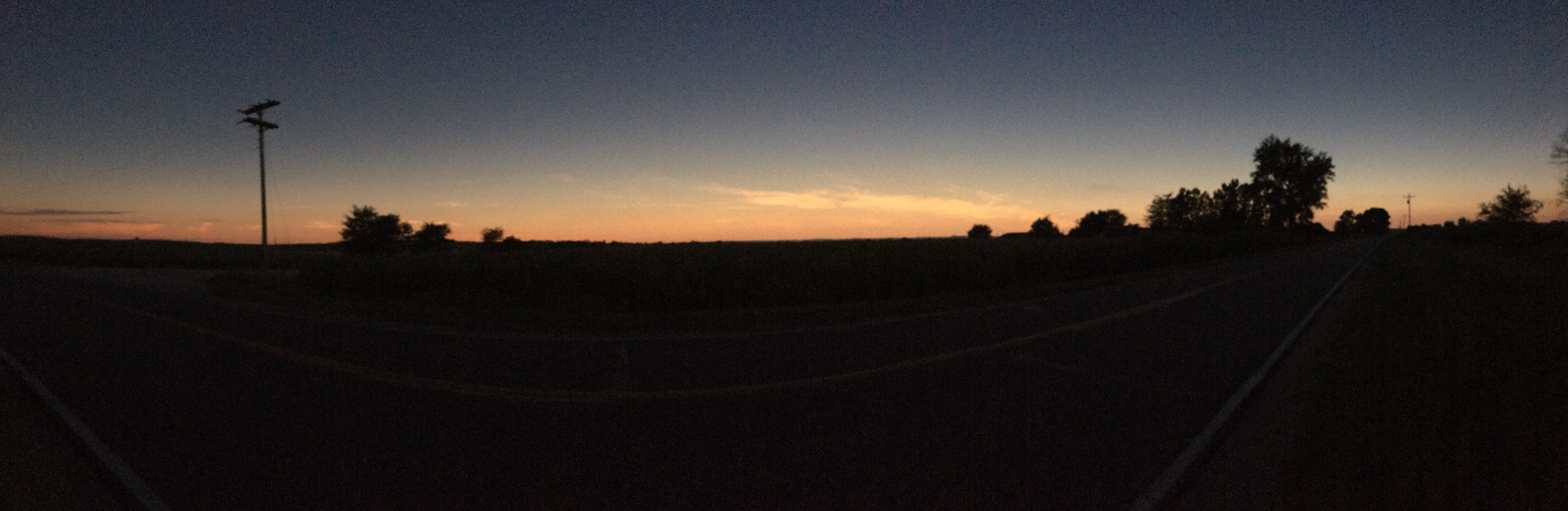
During totality north of Minatare, Nebraska

- Agate Fossil Beds National Monument – Special events including demonstrations of traditional Lakota culture and educational events for children were offered.
- Alliance – Entertainment and educational seminars were offered. ABC News reported live from Carhenge during totality.
- Auburn – Nemaha County Hospital hosted an eclipse viewing event, including sharing safety tips from Lifetime Vision Center.
- Beatrice – Homestead National Monument of America – Events were held with Bill Nye the Science Guy as well as representatives from NASA on Saturday, Sunday and the day of the eclipse.
- Grand Island – Stuhr Museum hosted an eclipse viewing event, including the launch of a NASA eclipse observing balloon.
- Lincoln – At Haymarket Park, the Lincoln Saltdogs, an independent baseball team in the American Association, defeated the Gary SouthShore RailCats 8–5 in a special eclipse game, with 6,956 in attendance. The game was paused for 26 minutes in the middle of the third inning to observe the eclipse. The Saltdogs players wore special eclipse-themed uniforms that were auctioned off after the game.

=== Kansas ===
- Atchison – Benedictine College hosted thousands in its football stadium. There were students from schools from Kansas, Missouri, Nebraska, and Oklahoma attending, plus numerous other guests who heard from, amongst others, astronomers from the Vatican Observatory.

=== Missouri ===
- Columbia – The Cosmo Park and the Gans Creek Park were open for the eclipse. There was a watch party on campus for the students at the University of Missouri coordinated by Angela Speck, and the MU Health Care system released eye safety information.
- Kansas City – A 5-mile (8 km) bicycle ride from downtown KCMO (where totality only lasted about 30 seconds) to Macken Park in North Kansas City (where totality lasted 1 minute 13 seconds) was organized by KC Pedal Party Club, a local Meetup group.
- Lathrop – The city celebrated its 150th anniversary with an eclipse festival.
- Parkville – TotalEclipseofthePark – August 20 educational program featuring NASA Glenn Research Center Hall of Famer Lynn Bondurant, '61, and August 21 watch party organized by Park University.
- Potosi – Hora Eclipse, an Israeli folkdance camp coordinated with the eclipse, was held at YMCA Trout Lodge and Camp Lakewood, near the Mark Twain National Forest. More information at the event's website, especially its post-mortem page.
- St. Clair – An event organized by the St. Clair City Chamber of Commerce.
- St. Joseph – An event organized by Front Page Science was held at Rosecrans Memorial Airport.
- St. Louis – David Tipper hosted his Tipper & Friends 4321 electronic music event at Astral Valley Art Park featuring 5 days of music, art, and eclipse viewing.

=== Illinois ===
The Ring of Fire as seen from Makanda, Illinois

- Carbondale – Southern Illinois University sponsored many eclipse related educational events, including the two day Crossroads Astronomy, Science and Technology Expo, and viewing at Saluki Stadium. Amtrak ran a special train, the Eclipse Express, from Chicago to Carbondale. NASA EDGE was broadcasting live from Southern Illinois University Carbondale with a four-hour and thirty-minute show (11:45 a.m. – 4:15 p.m. EDT).
- Carterville – A three-day rock festival called Moonstock was headlined by Ozzy Osbourne, who performed during the eclipse.
- Goreville – The University of Illinois Astronomy Department hosted a viewing event in town, which was the closest village to the point of longest duration.

=== Kentucky ===
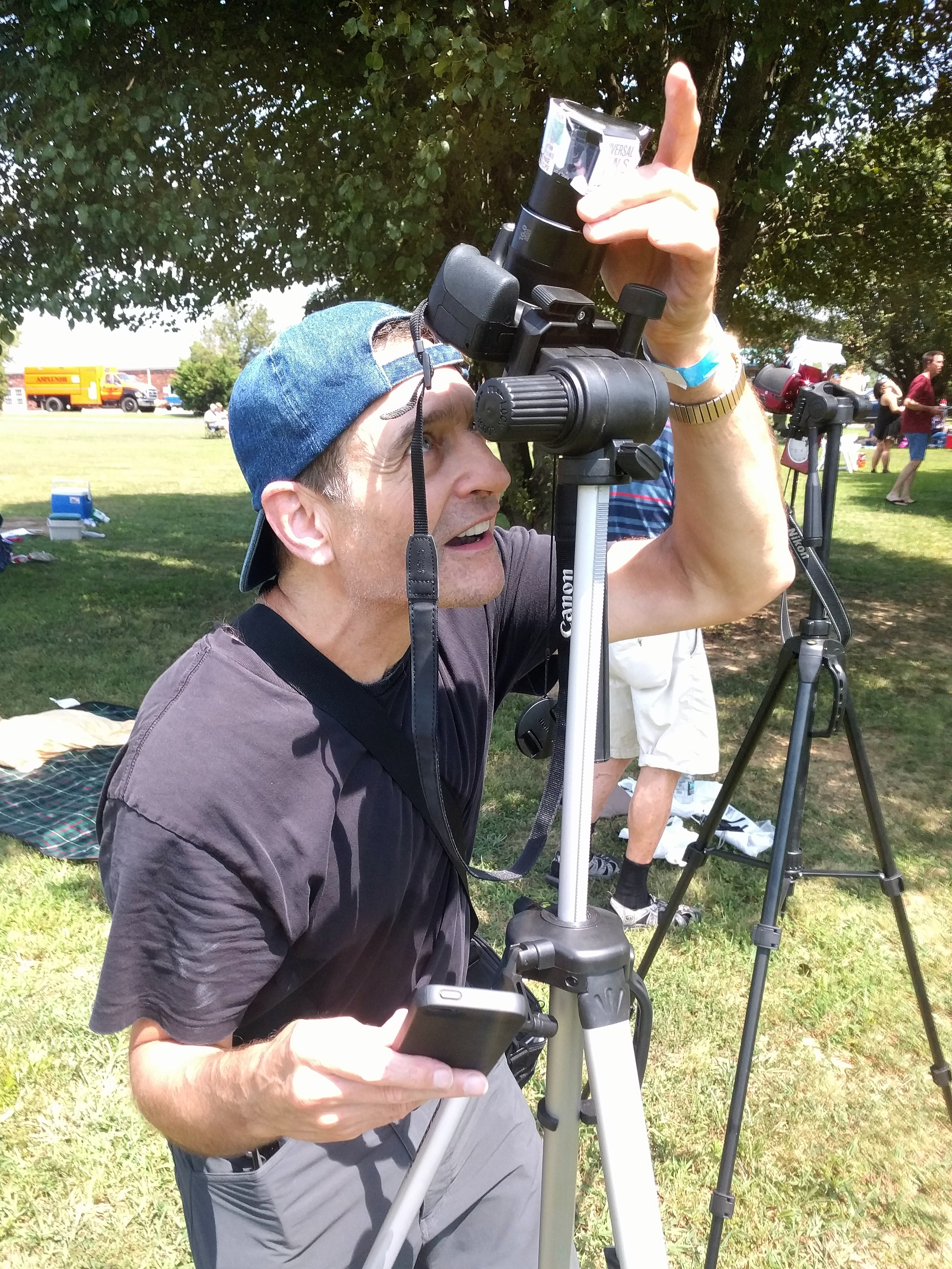
An eclipse photographer in Madisonville, Kentucky

- Bowling Green – Western Kentucky University hosted thousands of K-12 students in its football stadium. At Bowling Green Ballpark, the Bowling Green Hot Rods, a Class A baseball team, played an eclipse game against the visiting West Michigan Whitecaps.
- Hopkinsville – A four-day eclipse festival was held at Jefferson Davis State Historic Site.

=== Tennessee ===
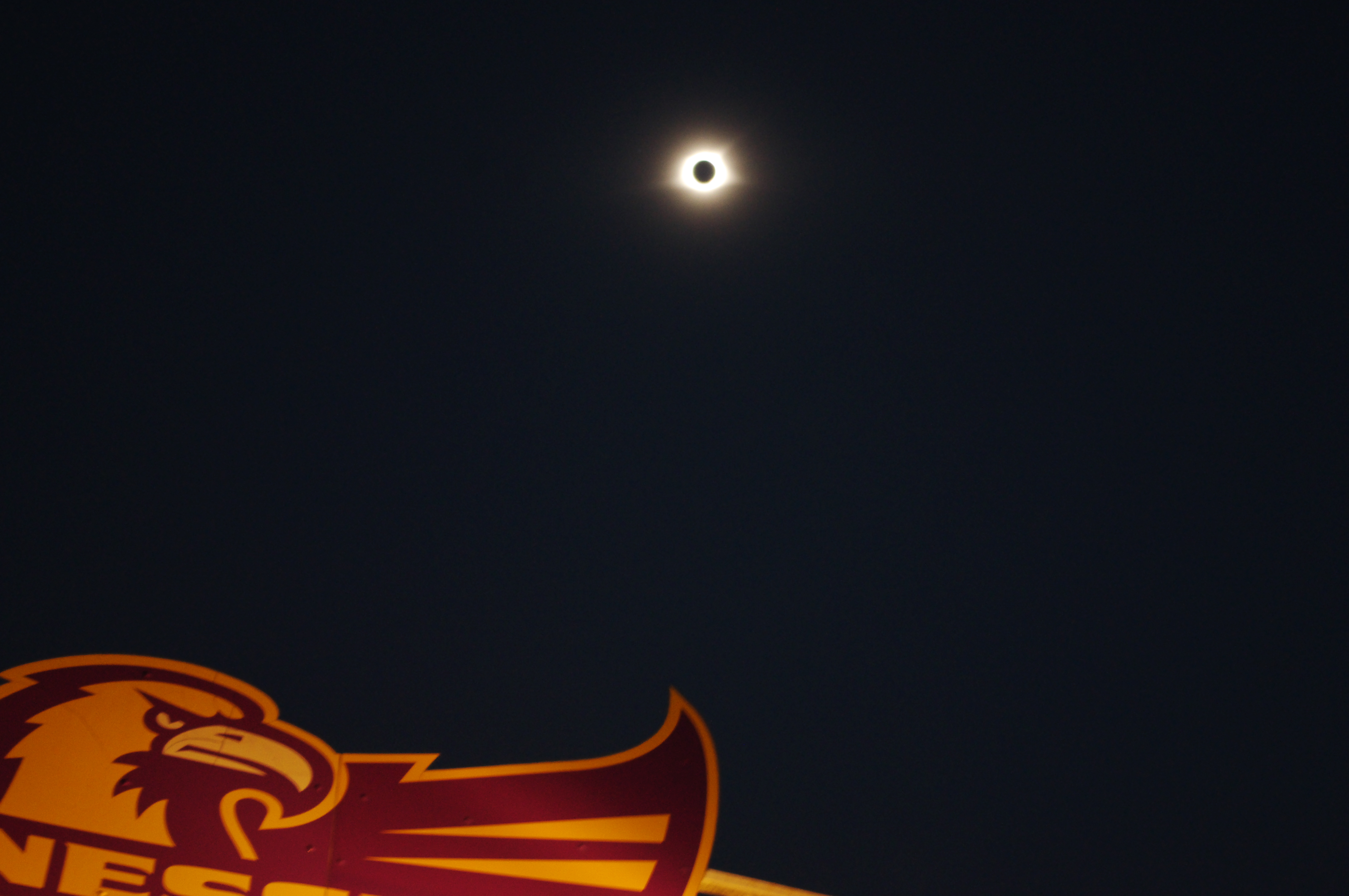
Totality from Tennessee Tech in Cookeville, Tennessee

- Athens – The City of Athens hosted "Total Eclipse of the Park" at Athens Regional Park, including entertainment, food, and vendors.
- Clarksville – Austin Peay State University presented several educational events, including an appearance by astronaut Rhea Seddon.
- Cookeville – Tennessee Tech hosted a solar eclipse viewing party at Tucker Stadium. Cookeville hosted special events from Saturday to Monday.
- McMinnville – celebrated the eclipse by hosting BLACKOUT 2017, an eclipse viewing event held in the city square. In addition to the viewing, a selection of food trucks and musical acts which features The Pink Floyd Appreciation Society band who performed Pink Floyd's The Dark Side of the Moon in its entirety prior to the totality event.
- Memphis – At AutoZone Park, the Memphis Redbirds, a Class AAA baseball team, played an eclipse game against the visiting New Orleans Baby Cakes.
- Nashville – offered many special events, including the Music City Eclipse Science & Technology Festival at the Adventure Science Center. The Italian Lights Festival hosted the largest Eclipse Viewing Party in Nashville, a free NASA-Certified Eclipse Event held at the Bicentennial Mall. Two astrophysicists from NASA's Jet Propulsion Laboratory emceed the countdown.

=== North Carolina ===
- Bryson City – Planetarium shows were offered, as well as rides on the Great Smoky Mountains Railroad to an eclipse location.
- Cullowhee – The eclipse was visible in totality, and classes were cancelled for several hours during the first day of classes at Western Carolina University.
- Rosman – Pisgah Astronomical Research Institute (PARI) hosted a viewing event. The event at PARI has garnered international attention and the visitors included amateur astronomers.

=== Georgia ===
- Athens – Viewing at Sanford Stadium at the University of Georgia.
- Blairsville – Get off the Grid Festival on three days preceding the eclipse.
- Elbert County – Approximately 400 people gathered at the Georgia Guidestones.

=== South Carolina ===
Video of the eclipse second contact in Simpsonville, South Carolina. Crowd reaction is heard on audio.

- Anderson – Viewing at the Green Pond Landing on Lake Hartwell with food trucks, astronomer, and music. Clouds blocked the Sun at the beginning of totality, but almost completely disappeared throughout.
- Charleston – The College of Charleston hosted NASA's "eclipse headquarters" broadcast as part of an afternoon eclipse viewing celebration on the green behind the campus library.
- Clemson – Viewing at Clemson University.
- Columbia – The South Carolina State Museum hosted four days of educational events, including an appearance by Apollo 16 astronaut Charles Duke. At Spirit Communications Park, the Columbia Fireflies, a Class A baseball team, played an eclipse game against the visiting Rome Braves.
- Greenville – Viewing at Furman University. Events include streaming coverage from NASA, educational activities, and live music. At Fluor Field, the Greenville Drive, a Class A baseball team, played an eclipse game against the visiting West Virginia Power.
- Sumter – Viewing at Dillon Park. Eclipse viewing glasses given away for free.
- Goose Creek – The clouds blocked the Eclipse that day much like in Anderson.

== Viewing from outside the United States ==
=== Canada ===
A partial eclipse was visible across the width of Canada, ranging from 89 percent in Victoria, British Columbia to 11 percent in Resolute, Nunavut. In Ottawa, viewing parties were held at the Canada Aviation and Space Museum. In Toronto, viewing parties were held at the CNE and the Ontario Science Centre.

=== Mexico, Central America, Caribbean islands, South America ===
A partial eclipse was visible from Central America, Mexico, the Caribbean islands, and ships and aircraft in and above the adjacent oceans, as well as the northern countries of South America such as Colombia, Venezuela, and several others.

On the Caribbean Sea, Bonnie Tyler performed her 1983 song "Total Eclipse of the Heart" live with the pop group DNCE on board the cruise ship Oasis of the Seas, as the ship entered the eclipse's totality path, east of The Bahamas.

=== Europe ===
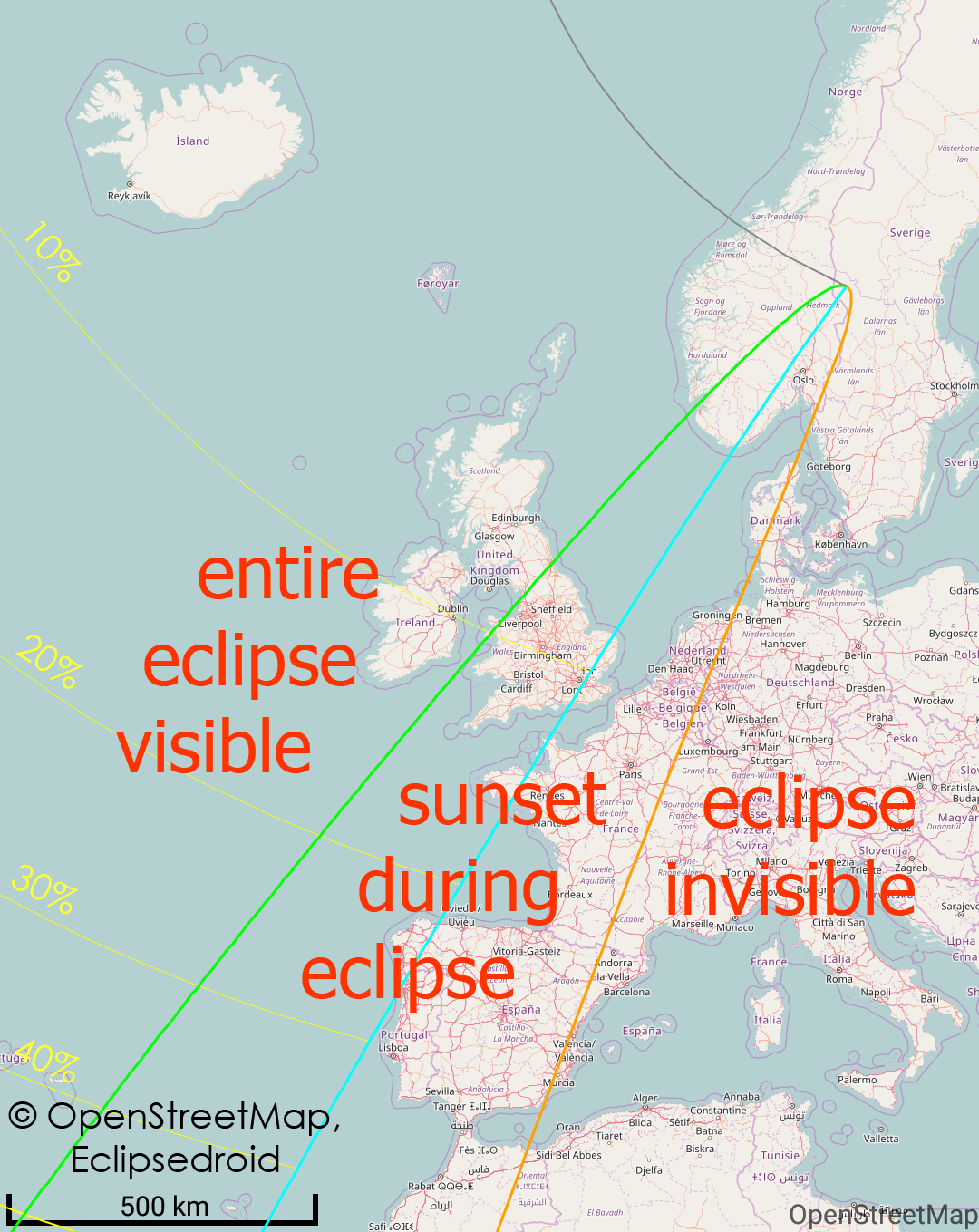
Boundaries of the sunset partial eclipse in Western Europe

In northwestern Europe, a partial eclipse was visible in the evening or at sunset. Only those in Iceland, Ireland, Scotland and the Portuguese Azores archipelago saw the eclipse from beginning to end; in Wales, England, Norway, the Netherlands, Belgium, France, Spain, and Portugal, sunset occurred before the end of the eclipse. In Germany, the beginning of the eclipse was visible just at sunset only in the extreme northwest of the country. In all regions east of the orange line on the map, the eclipse was not visible.

=== Asian Russia ===
A partial eclipse was visible during sunrise or morning hours in Russian Far East (including Severnaya Zemlya and New Siberian Islands archipelagos). For big cities in Russia, the maximal obscuration was in Anadyr, and it was 27.82%.

=== West Africa ===
In some locations in West Africa and western North Africa, a partial eclipse was seen just before and during sunset. The most favorable conditions to see this eclipse gained the Cape Verde Archipelago with nearly 0.9 magnitude at the Pico del Fogo volcano.

== Media and scientific coverage ==
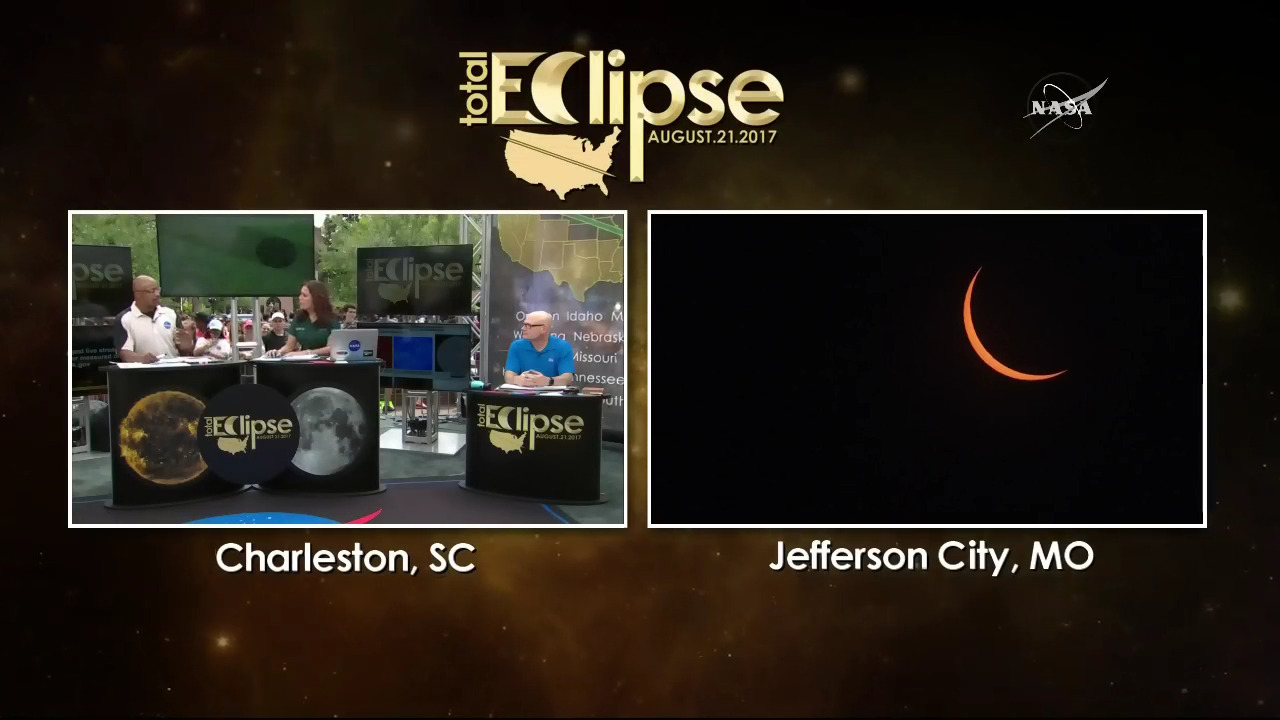
NASA TV's live coverage was being watched by 4.4 million people at 1:40 EDT, accounting for 87% of all traffic to U.S. federal government websites.

A large number of media outlets broadcast coverage of the eclipse, including television and internet outlets. NASA announced plans to offer streaming coverage through its NASA TV and NASA Edge outlets, using cameras stationed on the ground along the path of totality, along with cameras on high-altitude balloons, jets, and coverage from the International Space Station; NASA stated that "never before will a celestial event be viewed by so many and explored from so many vantage points—from space, from the air, and from the ground." ABC, CBS, and NBC announced that they would respectively broadcast live television specials to cover the eclipse with correspondents stationed across the path of totality, along with CNN, Fox News Channel, Science, and The Weather Channel. The PBS series Nova presented streaming coverage on Facebook hosted by Miles O'Brien, and aired a special episode chronicling the event—"Eclipse Over America"—later in the day (which marked the fastest production turnaround time in Nova history).

Other institutions and services also announced plans to stream their perspectives of the eclipse, including the Exploratorium in San Francisco, the Elephant Sanctuary of Hohenwald, Tennessee, the Slooh robotic telescope app, and The Virtual Telescope Project. The Eclipse Ballooning Project, a consortium of schools and colleges that sent 50 high-altitude balloons into the sky during the eclipse to conduct experiments, provided streams of footage and GPS tracking of its launches. Contact with one balloon with $13,000 of scientific equipment, launched under the aegis of the LGF Museum of Natural History near Vale, Oregon, was lost at 20,000 feet (6,100 m). Given that the balloon was believed to have burst at 100,000 feet (30,000 m), it could have parachuted down anywhere from eastern Oregon to Caldwell, Idaho (most likely) to Sun Valley, Idaho; a $1,000 reward is offered for its recovery.

The National Solar Observatory organized Citizen CATE volunteers to man 60 identical telescopes and instrumentation packages along the totality path to study changes in the corona over the duration of the eclipse.

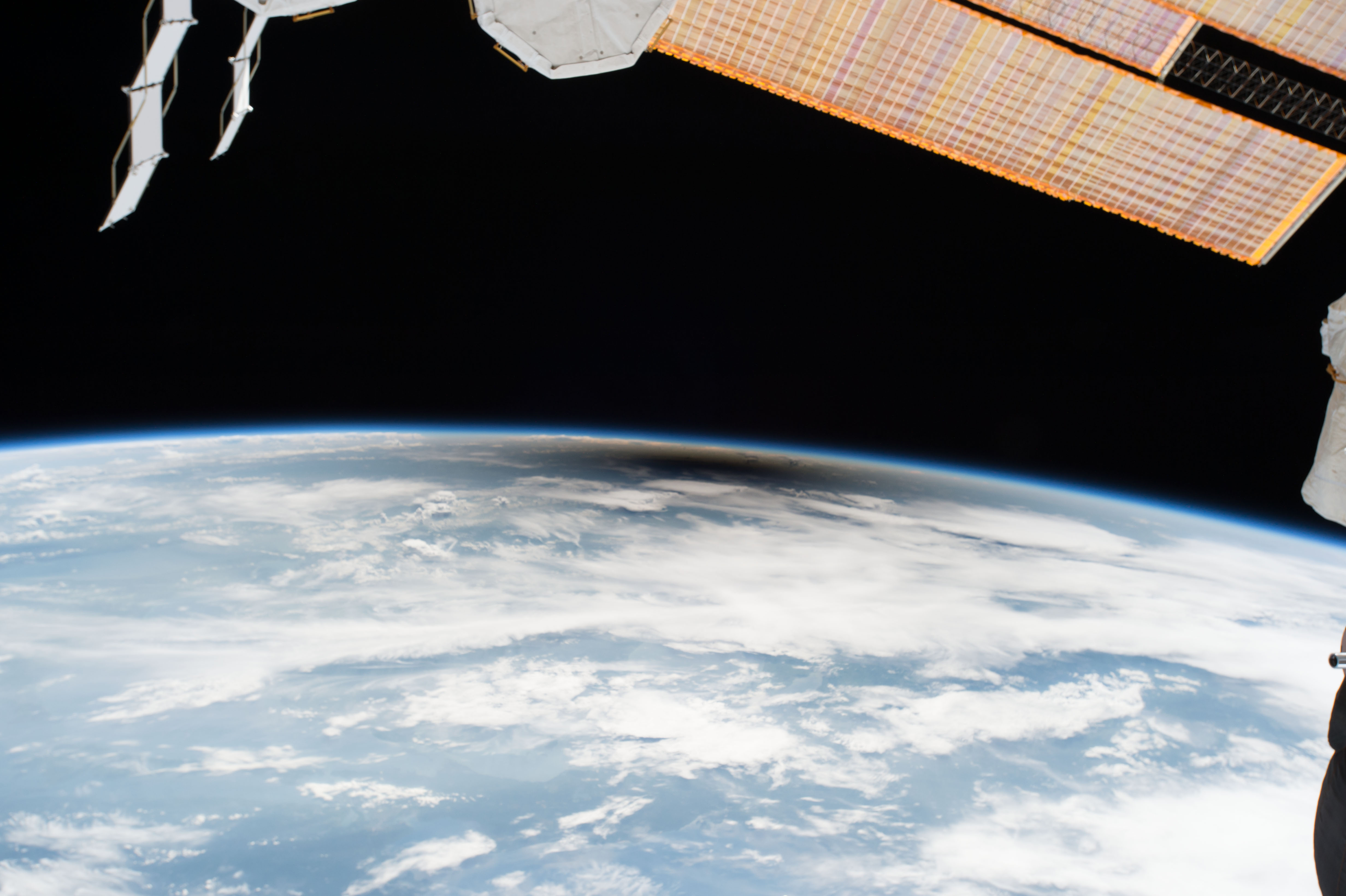
The Moon's umbra, as seen from the International Space Station

In orbit, the International Space Station and the satellites Lunar Reconnaissance Orbiter, Solar Dynamics Observatory, Moderate Resolution Imaging Spectroradiometer, Solar and Heliospheric Observatory, and Hinode gathered data from the eclipse.

A viewing party was held at the White House, during which President Donald Trump appeared on the Truman Balcony with First Lady Melania Trump. With the Sun partially eclipsed, President Trump looked briefly in the general direction of the Sun before using solar viewing glasses. Late-night comedians Trevor Noah and Conan O’Brien joked about Trump not wearing glasses, and The Independent described it as "perhaps one of the most enduring images of Donald Trump's presidency".

The rapper Joey Badass boasted of watching the solar eclipse without viewing glasses, considering that "our ancestors ain't have no fancy eyewear [and] they ain't all go blind". Unlike the US president, he did not wear viewing glasses during the entire eclipse. Later, he complained of vision problems and had to cancel his Cleveland, Chicago & Toronto shows on the Everybody Tour, due to "unforeseen circumstances".

The eclipse generated reports of abnormal behavior in animal and plant life. Some chickens came out from beneath their coops and began grooming, usually an evening activity. Horses displayed increased whinnying, running, and jumping after the event. Cicadas were reported to grow louder before going silent during totality. Various birds were also observed flying in unusually large formations. Flowers such as the Hibiscus closed their petals which typically happens at night, before opening again after the solar event.

Pornhub, a pornographic video-sharing website provided an unusual sociological and statistical report: its traffic dropped precipitously along the path of totality, so much so that its researchers were themselves surprised.

NASA reported over 90 million page views of the eclipse on its websites, making it the agency's biggest online event ever, beating the previous web traffic record about seven times over.

== Counterfeit eclipse glasses ==
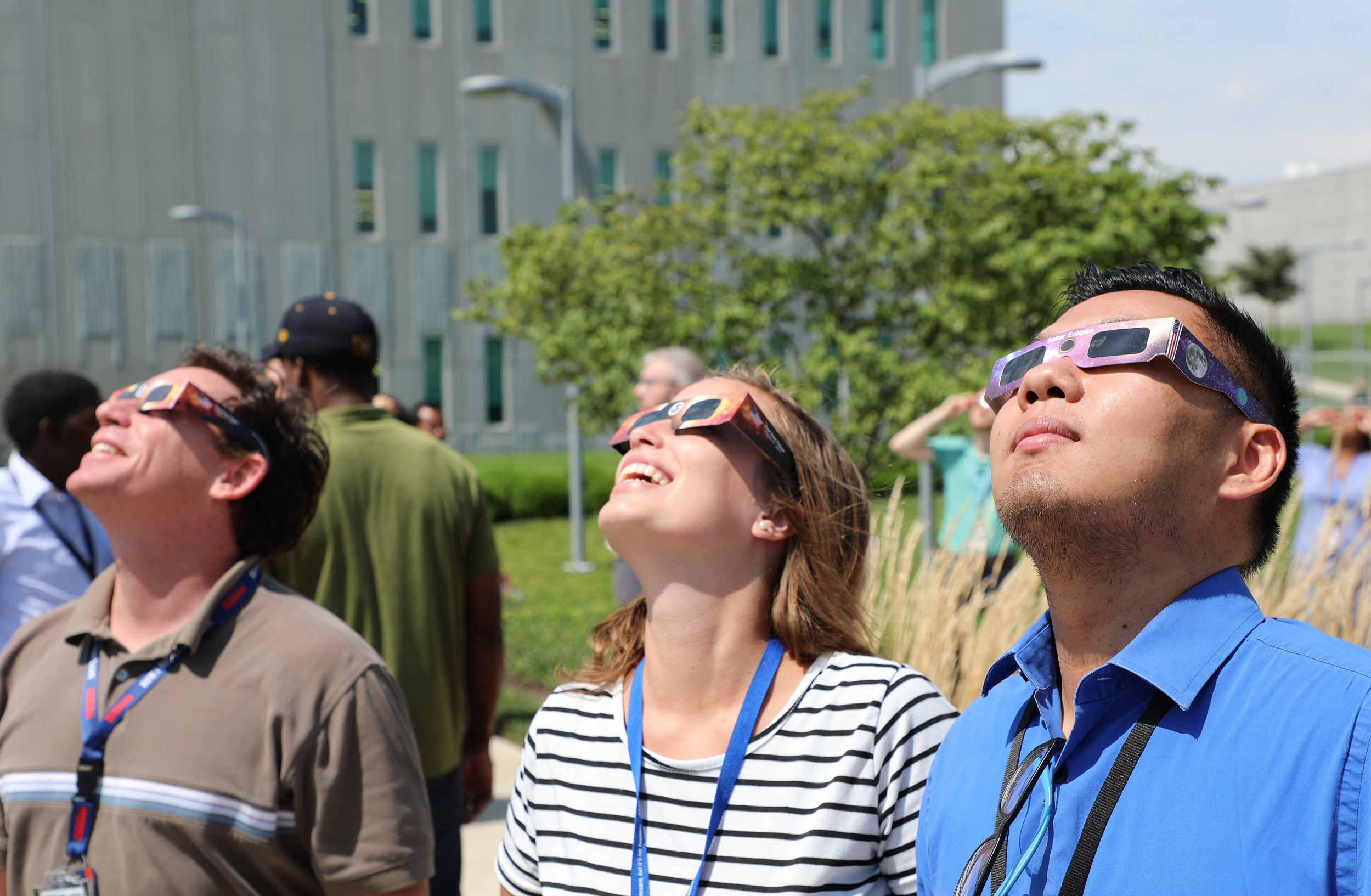
Three people wearing eclipse glasses at the Kansas City National Security Campus in Kansas City, Missouri

In the months leading up to the eclipse, many counterfeit glasses were put up for sale. Effective eclipse glasses must not only block most visible light, but most UV and infrared light as well. For visible light, the user should only be able to see the Sun, sunlight reflected off shiny metal, halogen bulbs, the filament in unfrosted incandescent bulbs, and similarly intense sources. Determining whether the glasses effectively block enough UV and infrared light requires the use of spectrophotometer, which is a rather expensive piece of lab equipment.

The eye's retina lacks pain receptors, and thus damage can occur without one's awareness.

The American Astronomical Society (AAS) said products meeting the ISO 12312-2 standard avoid risk to one's eyes and issued a list of reputable vendors of eclipse glasses. The organization warned against products claiming ISO certification or even citing the same number, but not tested by an accredited laboratory. Another problem was counterfeits of reputable vendors' products, some even claiming the company's name such as with American Paper Optics which published information detailing the differences between its glasses and counterfeits.

Andrew Lund, the owner of a company which produces eclipse glasses, noted that not all counterfeit glasses were necessarily unsafe. He stated to Quartz that the counterfeits he tested blocked the majority of harmful light spectrum, concluding that "the IP is getting ripped off, but the good news is there are no long-term harmful effects." As one example, the Springdale Library in metropolitan Pittsburgh, Pennsylvania, accidentally passed out dozens of pairs of counterfeit eclipse glasses, but as of August 23 had not received any reports of eye damage.

On July 27, 2017, Amazon required all eclipse viewing products sold on its website have a submission of origin and safety information, and proof of an accredited ISO certification. In mid-August 2017, Amazon recalled and pulled listings for eclipse viewing glasses that "may not comply with industry standards" and gave refunds to customers who had purchased them.

== Camera equipment damage ==
Lensrentals, a camera rental company based in Tennessee, reported that many of its customers returned cameras and lenses with extensive damage. The most common problem reported was damage to the camera's sensor. This most often happens when shooting in live view mode, where the sensor is continuously exposed to the eclipse image and becomes damaged by the Sun's light. Another problem was the heat and brightness of the eclipse destroying the lens iris, which mechanically regulates the amount of light that enters the camera. Another problem reported was one of a cinema camera's neutral-density filter being damaged by the heat and light of the eclipse. The cost of all of this damage likely amounted to thousands of dollars.

== Planning ==
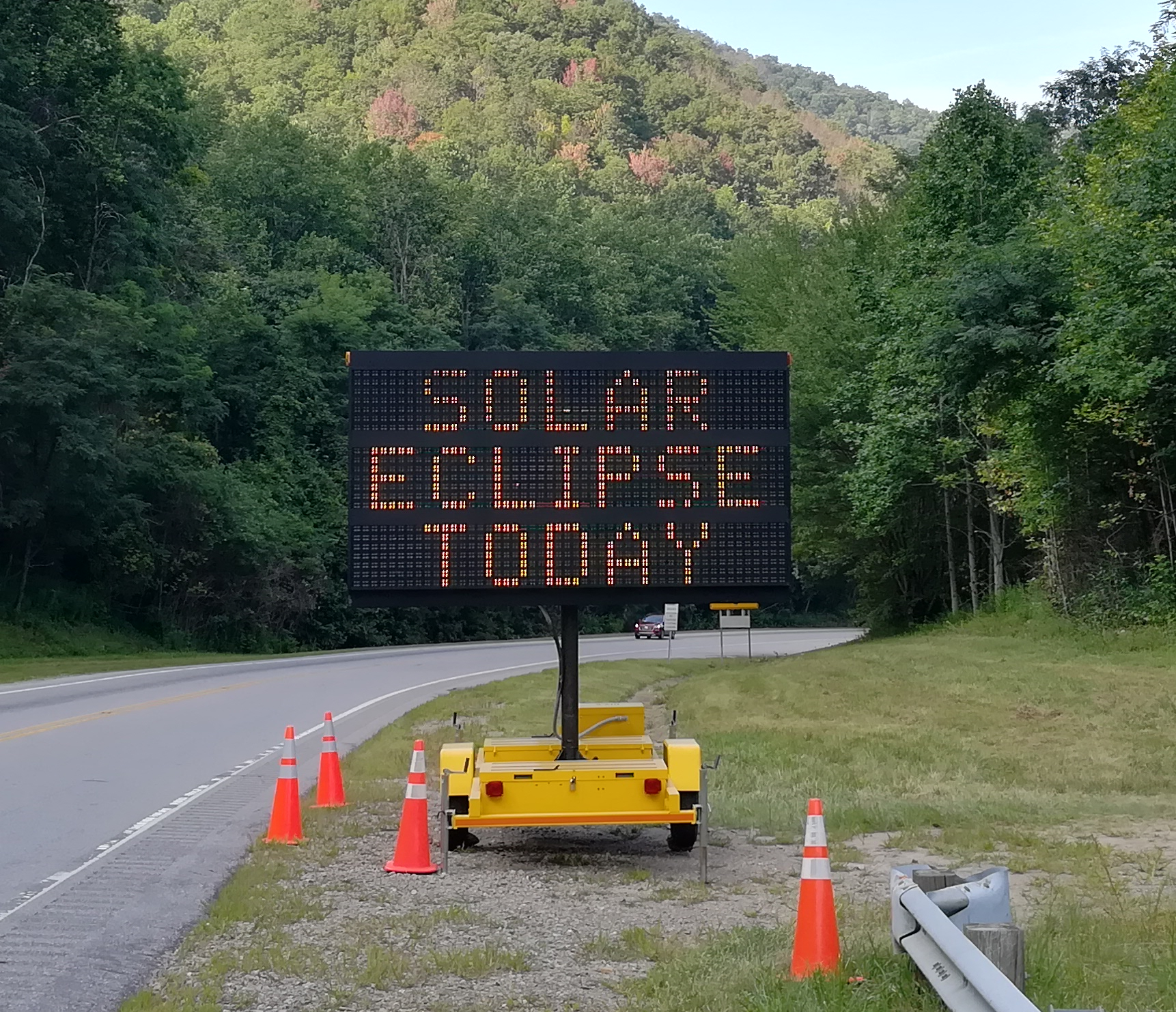
A variable-message sign on U.S. Route 64 in North Carolina, alerting drivers of the eclipse

Officials inside and near the path of totality planned – sometimes for years – for the sudden influx of people. Smaller towns struggled to arrange viewing sites and logistics for what could have been a tourism boom or a disaster.

In the American West, illegal camping was a major concern, including near cities like Jackson Hole, Wyoming. Idaho's Office of Emergency Management said Idaho was a prime viewing state, and advised jurisdictions to prepare for service load increases; nearly every hotel and motel room, campground, and in some cases backyards for nearly 100 miles (160 km) north and south of the path of totality had been reserved several months, if not years, in advance. The state anticipated up to 500,000 visitors to join its 1.6 million residents.

Oregon deployed six National Guard aircraft and 150 soldiers because the influx of visitors coincided with the state's fire season. Hospital staffing, and supplies of blood and anti–snake bite antidote, were augmented along the totality line.

Also in Oregon, there were reports of hoteliers canceling existing reservations made at the regular market rate and increasing their rate, sometimes threefold or more, for guests staying to view the eclipse. The Oregon Department of Justice (DOJ) investigated various complaints and reached settlements with affected customers of at least 10 hotels in the state. These settlements included refunds to the customers and fines paid to the DOJ.

== Post-eclipse traffic problems ==
Although traffic to areas within the path of totality was somewhat spread out over the days prior to the eclipse, there were widespread traffic problems across the United States after the event ended. Michael Zeiler, an eclipse cartographer, had estimated that between 1.85 million and 7.4 million people would travel to the path of the eclipse. Following the eclipse, it was estimated that 5 million people had travelled to the areas inside the path of totality to see the eclipse, which led to large-scale traffic jams after the end of totality. US officials anticipated a potentially even bigger travel turnout for the April 2024 solar eclipse 7 years later; ultimately, over 20 million people travelled to witness totality for the latter eclipse.

In Oregon, because an estimated one million people were expected to arrive, the Oregon National Guard was called in to help manage traffic in Madras along US 26 and US 97. Madras Municipal Airport received more than 400 mostly personal planes that queued for hours while waiting to leave after the eclipse.

Officials in Idaho, where the totality path crossed the center of the state, began planning for the eclipse a year in advance. The state Transportation Department suspended construction projects along Interstate 15, which traverses Eastern Idaho, from August 18–22 in order to have all lanes open; their counterparts in neighboring Utah, where many were expected to travel the 220 miles (350 km) north via the highway from the Salt Lake City metropolitan area, did the same. On the morning of the eclipse, many drivers left before dawn, creating traffic volume along I-15 normally not seen until morning rush hour; northbound traffic on the interstate in Box Elder County north of Salt Lake City slowed to 10–15 miles per hour (16–24 km/h). The Idaho State Police (ISP) stationed a patrol car along I-15 every 15 miles (24 km) between Shelley and the Utah border.

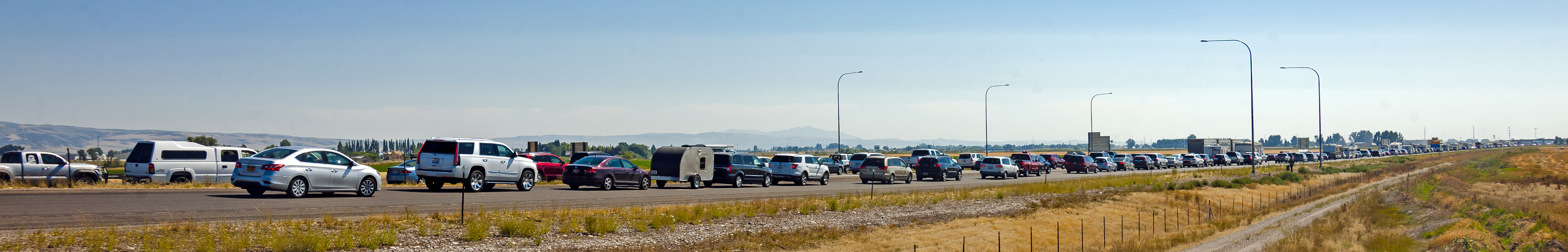
Traffic backed up on I-15/US 26 south of Idaho Falls

After the eclipse, traffic more than doubled along I-15 southbound, with extensive traffic jams continuing for eight hours as viewers who had traveled north into the totality path from Utah returned there and to points south. The ISP tweeted a picture of bumper-to-bumper traffic stalled on the interstate just south of Idaho Falls. Motorists reported to local news outlets that it was taking them two hours to travel the 47 miles (76 km) from that city to Pocatello to the south, a journey that normally takes 45 minutes. Others reported that it took three hours to travel from Idaho Falls to the closer city of Blackfoot, 30 miles (48 km) farther north of Pocatello.

In the rest of the state the impact was less severe. Traffic nearly doubled on US 93, and was up 55 percent on US 20.

For some northbound travelers on I-15, the Montana Department of Transportation had failed to make similar plans to those in Idaho, scheduling a road construction project to begin on August 21 that narrowed a section of the highway to a single northbound lane, near the exit to Clark Canyon Dam south of Dillon. Though that stretch of highway generally has a traffic count of less than 1,000 vehicles per day, on the day of the eclipse there were over a thousand vehicles per hour at peak times. As a result, traffic backed up as far as Lima, creating a delay of at least an hour for travelers heading northward. Further, as construction had not yet begun, drivers observed cones set up but no workers present on the road. While the state traditionally halts construction projects during high traffic periods, a state official admitted "we ... probably made a bad mistake here in this regard."

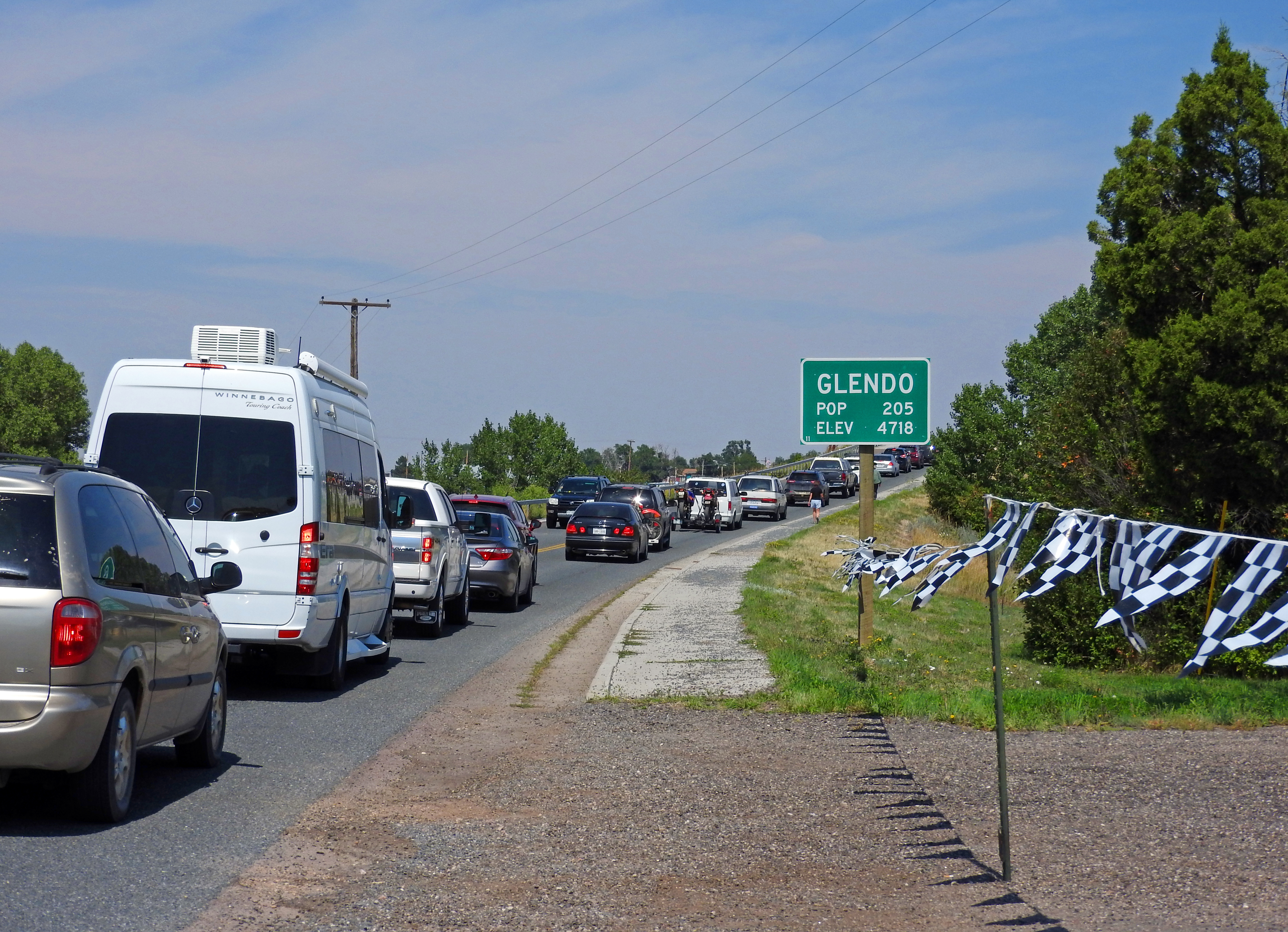
Traffic waiting to get on Interstate 25 at Glendo, Wyoming, after the eclipse

In Wyoming, estimates were that the population of the state, officially 585,000, may have doubled or even tripled, with traffic counts on August 21 showing 536,000 more cars than the five-year average for the third Monday in August; a 68 percent increase. One official offered an estimate of "two people in every car" to arrive at a one-million-visitor figure, and others noted that one million was a conservative estimate based on a one-day traffic count of limited portions of major highways. There were additional arrivals by aircraft, plus travelers who arrived early or stayed for additional days. Two days before the eclipse, traffic increased 18 percent over a five-year average, with an additional 131,000 vehicles on the road. Sunday saw an additional 217,000-vehicle increase.

Following the eclipse, more than 500,000 vehicles traveled Wyoming roads, creating large traffic jams, particularly on southbound and eastbound highways. Drivers reported that it took up to 10 hours to travel 160 miles (260 km) into northern Colorado. There was one traffic fatality, and another fatality related to an off-highway ATV accident, but in general there were far fewer incidents and traffic citations than authorities had anticipated.

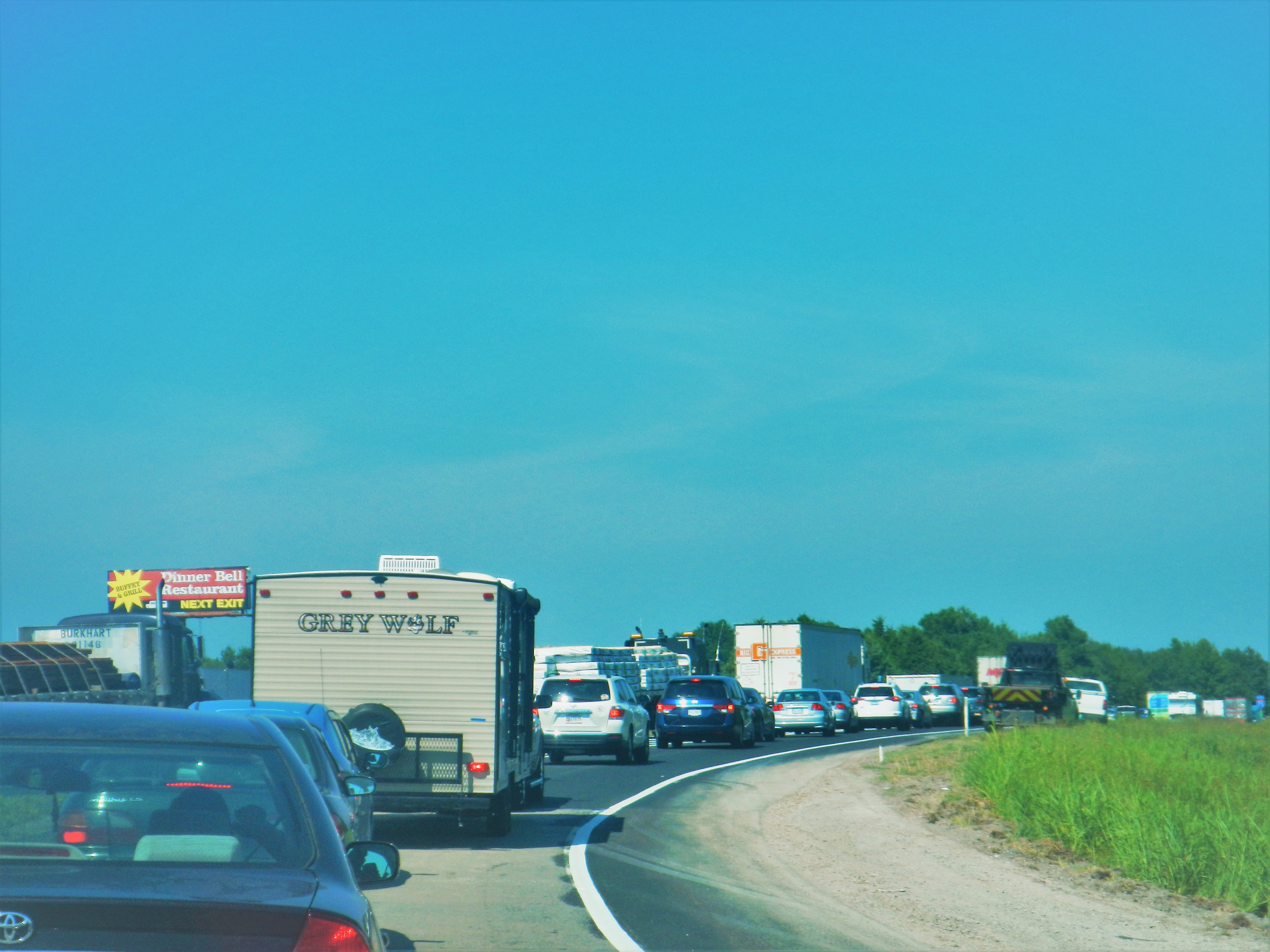
Traffic at a ramp to Interstate 75 near Sweetwater, Tennessee

In Tennessee, the Knoxville News Sentinel described the traffic problems created by the eclipse as the worst ever seen in that part of the state. One backup along Interstate 75 reached 34 miles (55 km) in length, between Niota and the Interstate 40 interchange at Farragut. A spokesman for the state's Department of Transportation allowed that the traffic jams were the worst he had seen in six and a half years on the job, noting that accidents had aggravated the already heavy traffic flows, attributed the I-75 congestion to Knoxville-area residents heading for the totality path at Sweetwater and returning during what was the city's normal afternoon rush hour.

Before the eclipse, state officials had described their traffic expectations as equivalent to that generated by the Bonnaroo Music Festival, the twice-a-season NASCAR Cup Series races at Bristol or the formerly-held Boomsday fireworks festival. "Maybe they should have considered a tsunami of traffic combining all three of those heavily attended events", the News Sentinel commented. The Tennessee Highway Patrol made sure that "[e]very trooper not on sick leave or military leave or pre-approved leave [wa]s working" the day of the eclipse; the state DOT made sure its full complement of emergency-aid HELP trucks were available as well. Alert signs on the highways also warned motorists not to pull over onto the shoulders to watch the eclipse as it could increase the risk of dangerous accidents and block the path of emergency vehicles.

In North Carolina, the Department of Transportation added cameras, message boards and safety patrols in the counties where the total eclipse would take place, as well as stopping road work. The department warned that due to "unprecedented" traffic ordinary activities requiring driving might prove difficult, and advised people to act as if there were snow.

In Kentucky, particularly around the Hopkinsville area, which was dubbed "Eclipseville, USA", post-eclipse traffic caused extensive delays. The en masse departure of tourists via Interstate 69 as well as the Western Kentucky Parkway resulted in commute times double or even triple of normal. The Hopkinsville-to-Lexington commute under normal circumstances lasts three and a half hours.

== Impact on solar power ==
An eclipse causes a reduction of solar power generation where the Moon shadow covers any solar panel, as do clouds.

The North American Electric Reliability Corporation predicted minor impacts, and attempted to measure the impact of the 2017 eclipse. In California, solar power was projected to decrease by 4–6,000 megawatts at 70 MW/minute, and then ramp up by 90 MW/minute as the shadow passes. CAISO's typical ramp rate is 29 megawatts per minute. Around 4 GW mainly in North Carolina and Georgia were expected to be 90 percent obscured.

After the 2017 eclipse, grid operators in California reported having lost 3,000–3,500 megawatts of utility-scale solar power, which was made up for by hydropower and gas reliably and as expected, mimicking the usual duck curve. Energy demand management was also used to mitigate the solar drop, and NEST customers reduced their demand by 700 MW.

NV Energy prepared for the solar eclipse months in advance and collaborated with 17 western states. When the eclipse began covering California with partial darkness, which reduced its usual amount of solar-generated electricity, NV Energy sent power there. Likewise, when Nevada received less sunlight, other west coast states supplied electricity to it. During the solar eclipse, the state of Nevada lost about 450 megawatts of electricity, the amount used by about a quarter million typical residences.

== Commemorative stamp ==
On June 20, 2017, the USPS released the first application of thermochromic ink to postage stamps in its Total Eclipse of the Sun Forever stamp to commemorate the eclipse. When pressed with a finger, body heat turns the dark image into an image of the full moon. The stamp was released prior to August 21, so uses an image from the eclipse of March 29, 2006 seen in Jalu, Libya.

== Videos ==
Time-lapse footage of Falls Park on the Reedy in Greenville, South Carolina

Shadow bands on the ground in Simpsonville, South Carolina

Animation of shadow movement from space

Illustration of umbra (black oval), penumbra (concentric shaded ovals), and path of totality (red)

Illustration featuring several visualizations of the event

Short time-lapse of umbra as it moves across the clouds

Video of the moment totality occurred in Newberry, South Carolina

== Gallery ==
=== Totality ===
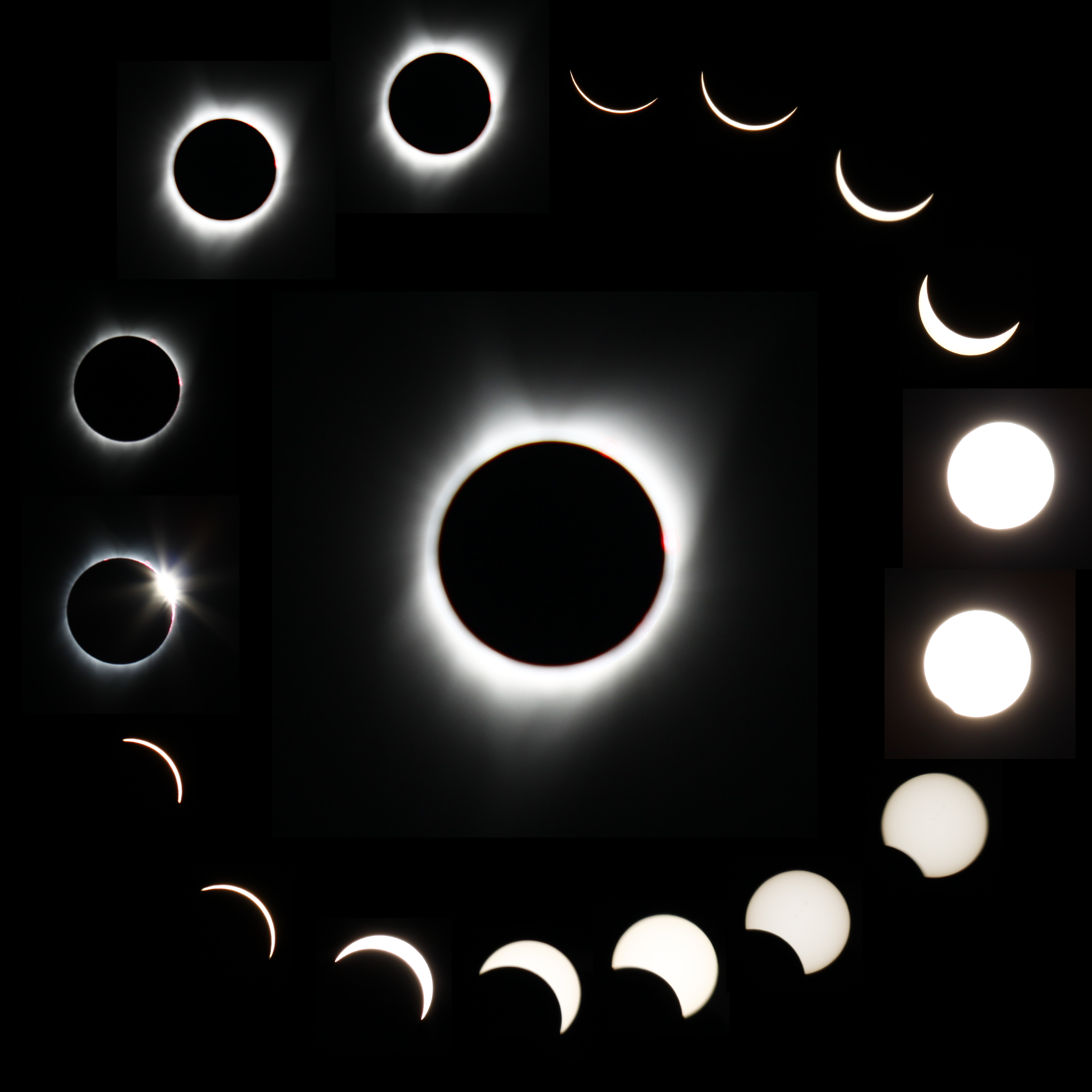
Sequence starting at 9:06 am, totality at 10:19 am, and ending at 10:21 am PDT, as seen from Corvallis, Oregon

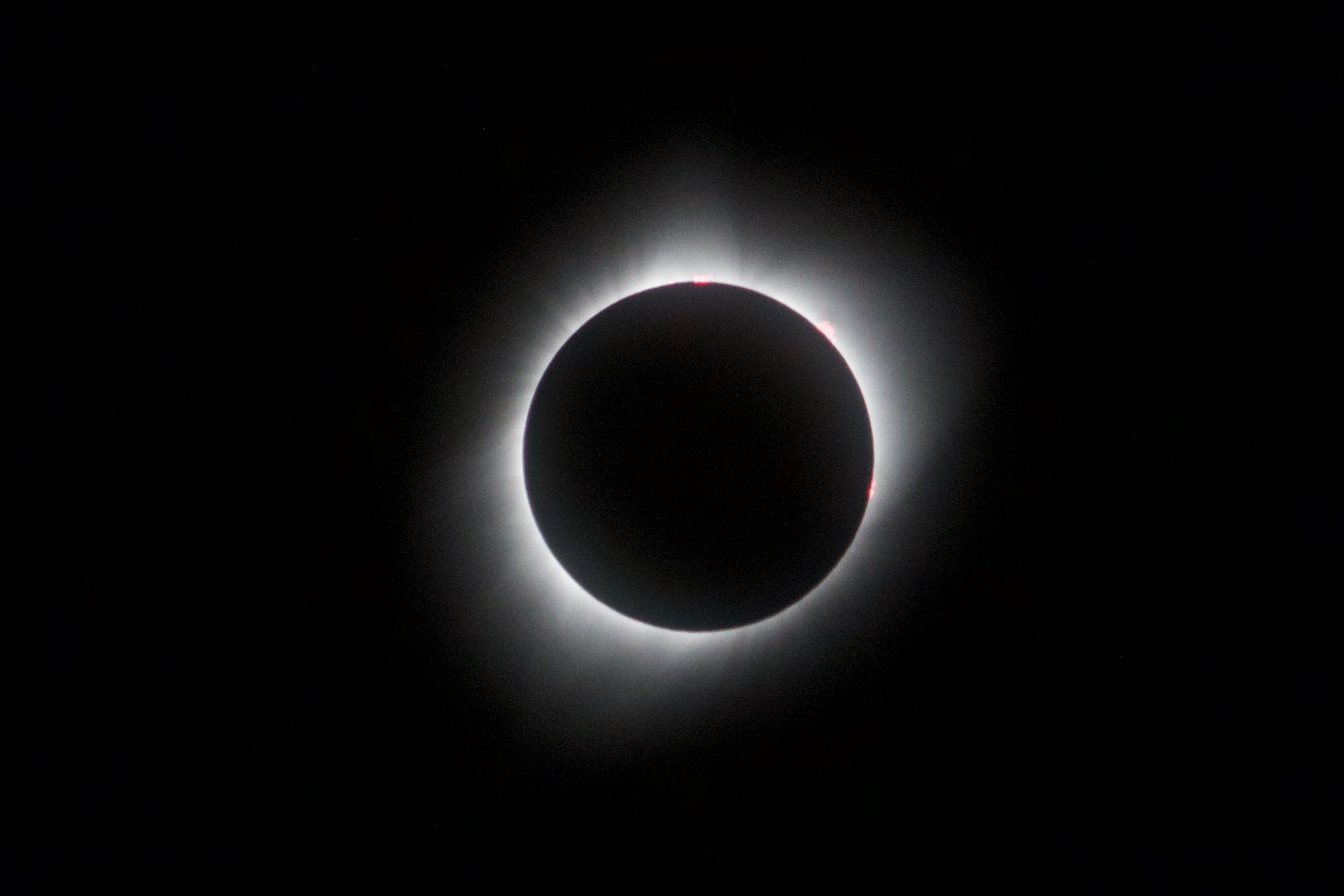
Totality and prominences as seen from Glenrock, Wyoming

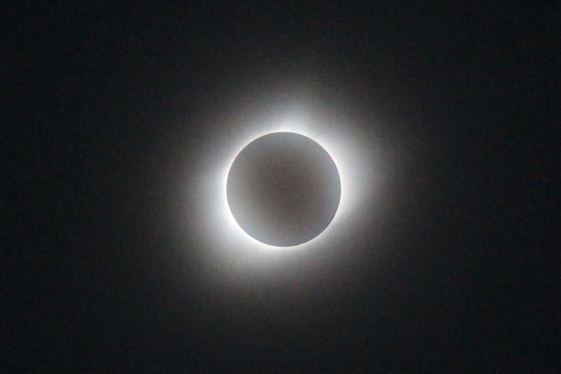
Totality as seen from Columbia, Missouri

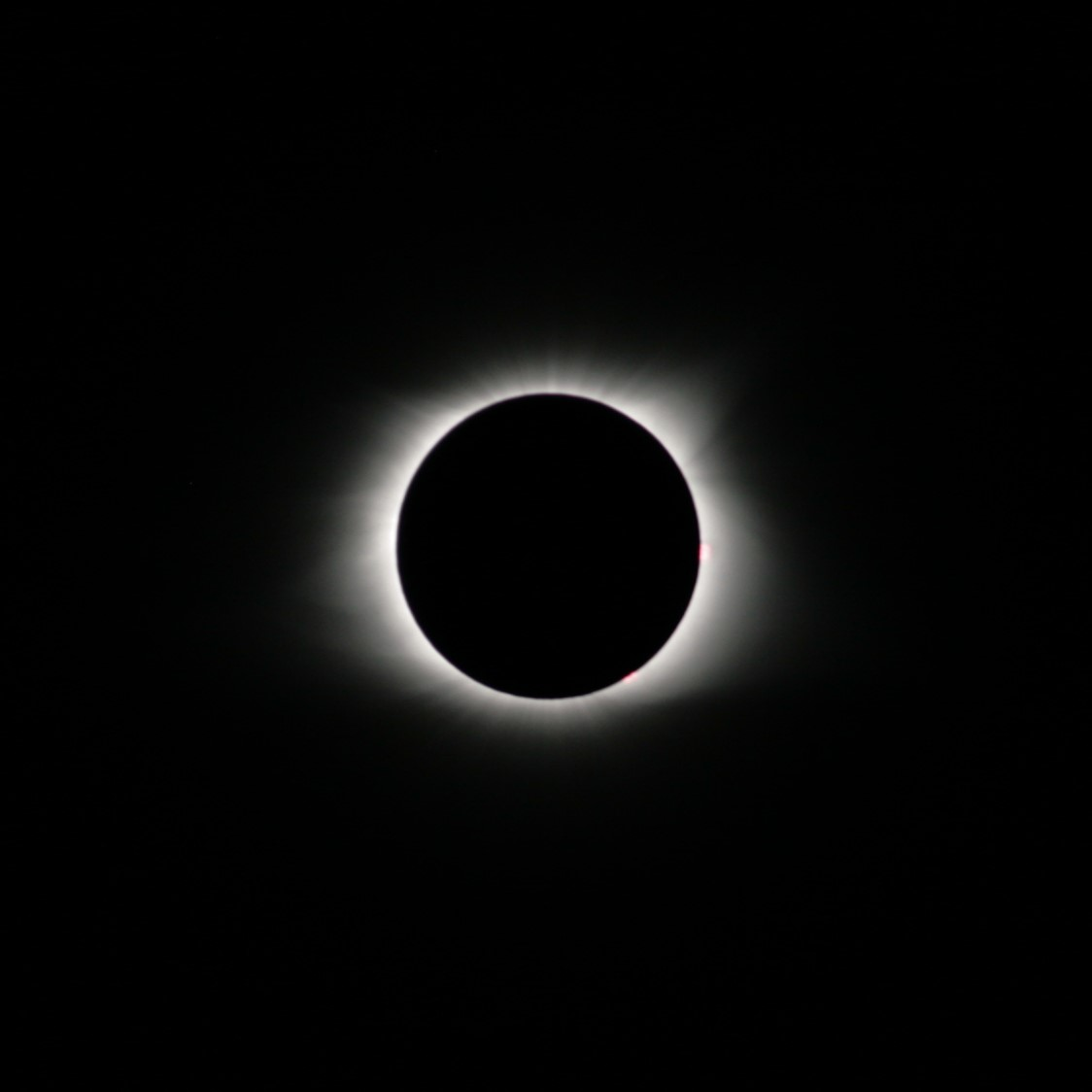
Totality as seen from Sweetwater, Tennessee

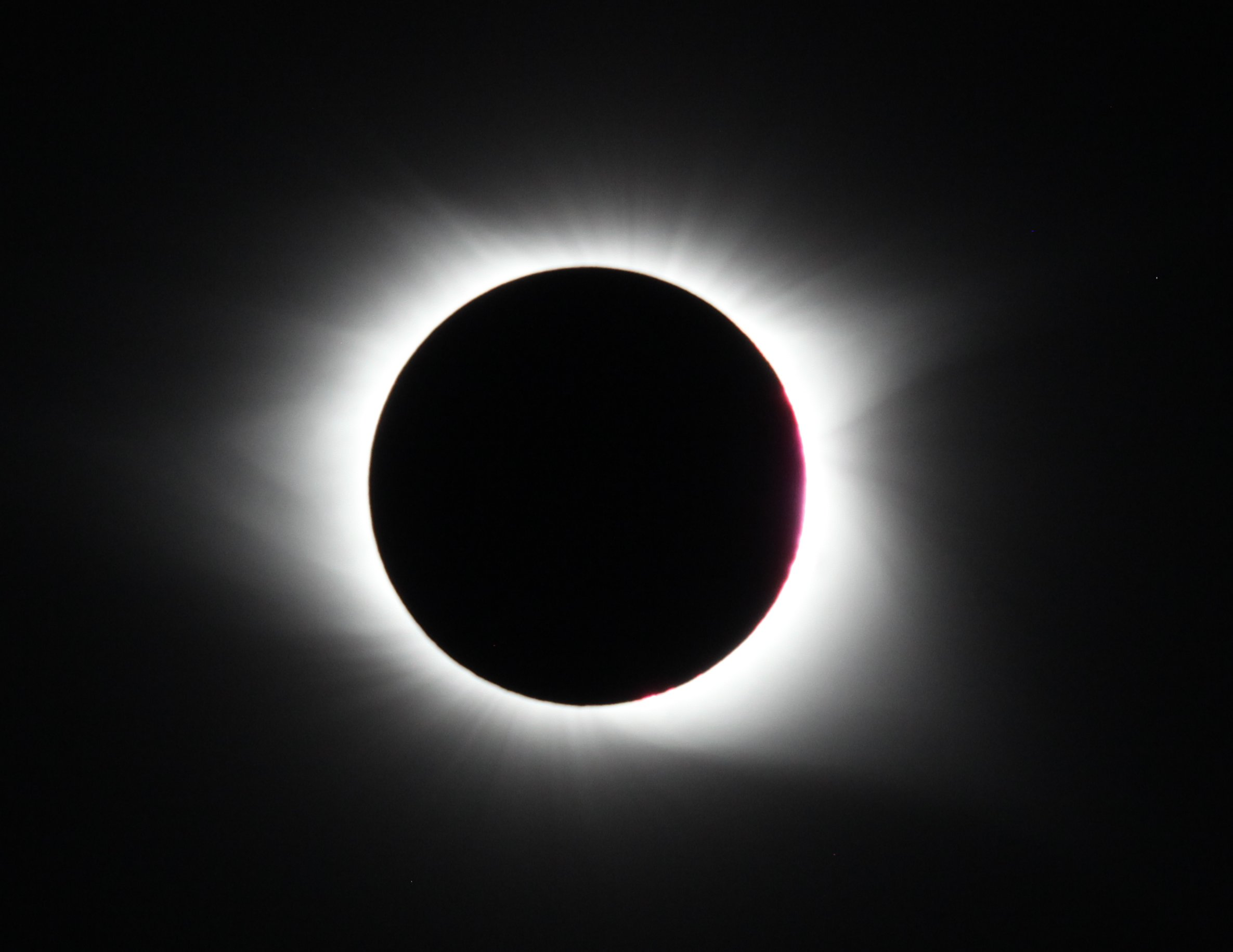
Totality as seen from Saint Paul, Clarendon County, South Carolina

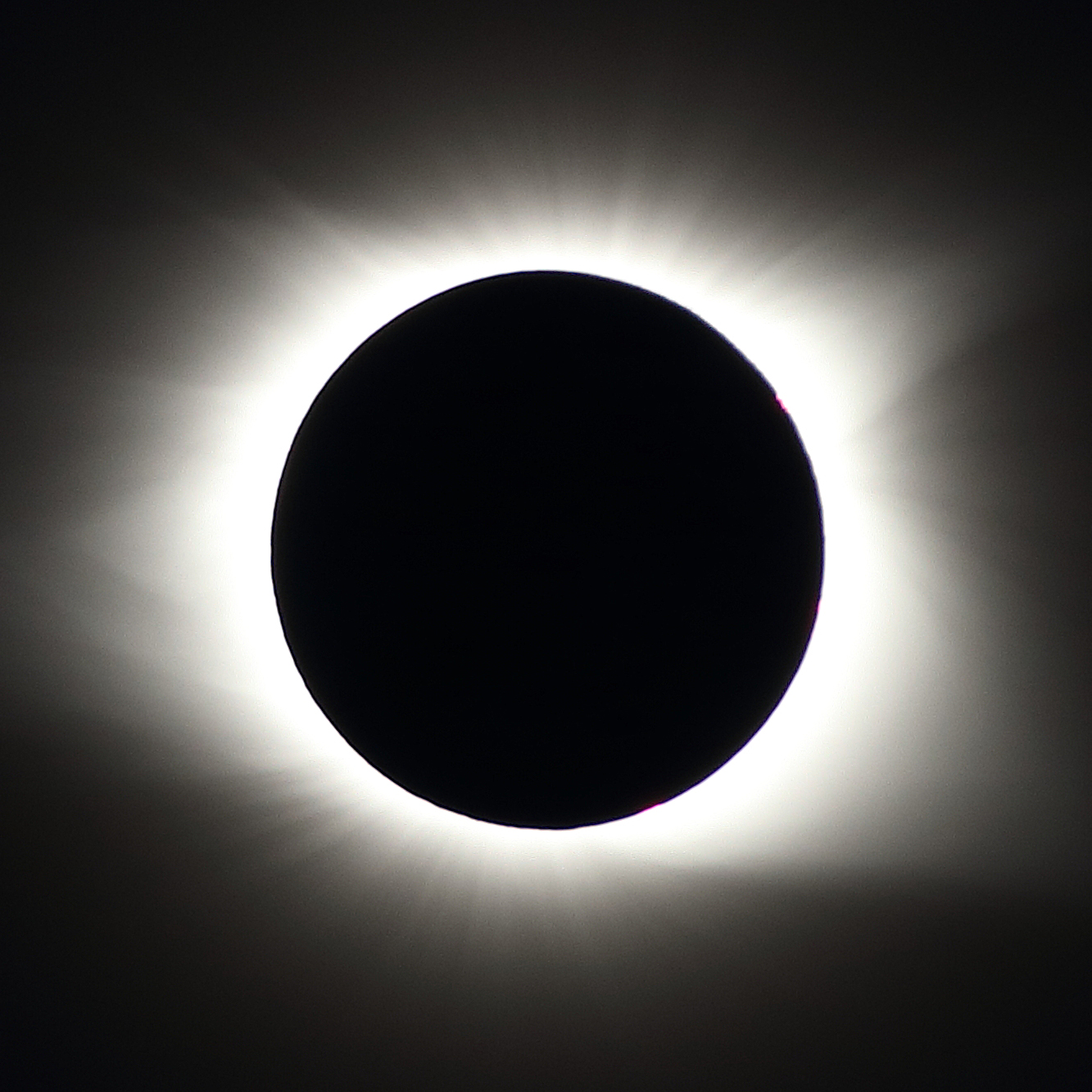
Totality as seen from Newberry, South Carolina

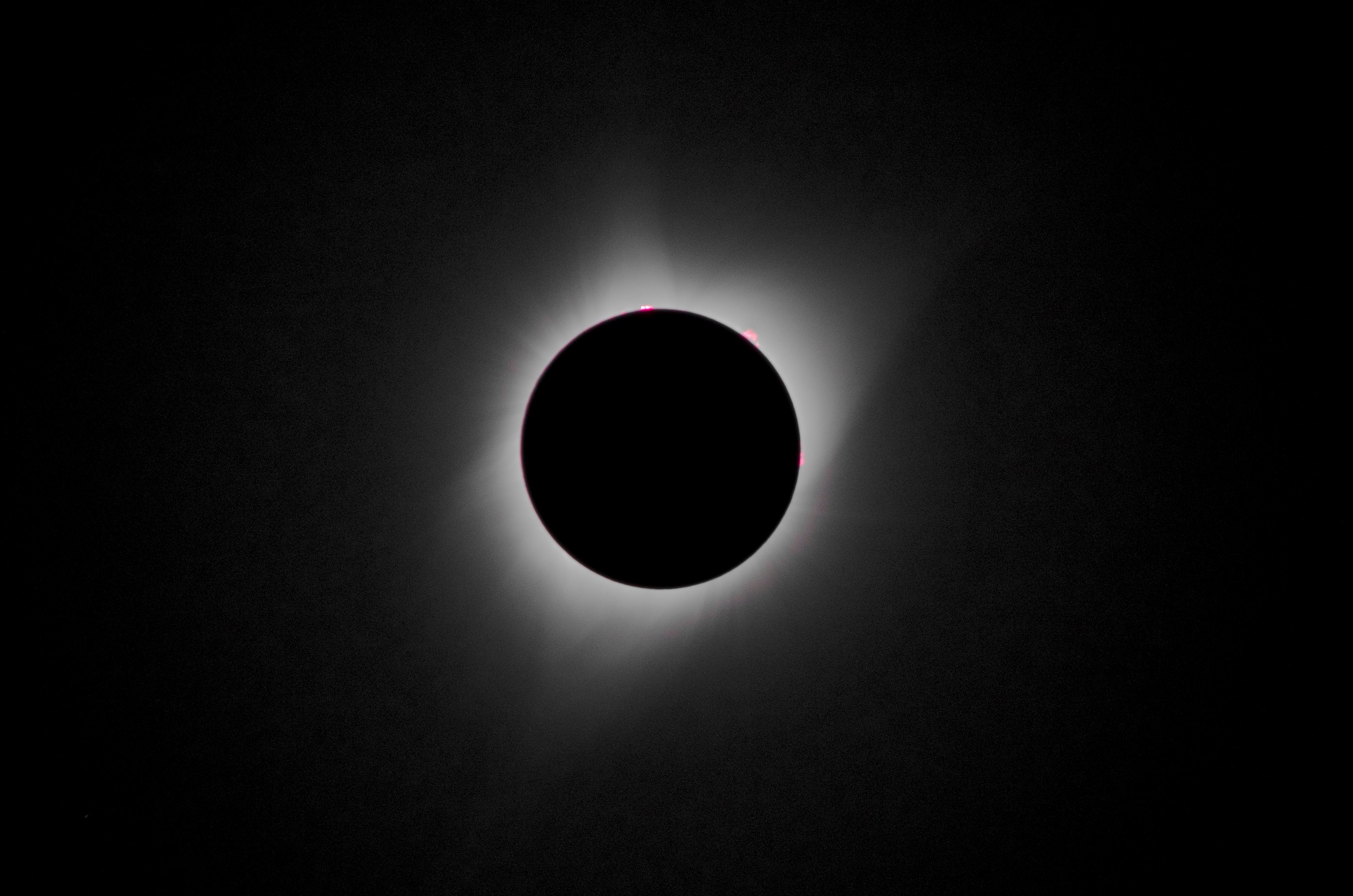
Totality as seen from Grand Teton National Park, Wyoming

Totality with stars as seen from Makanda, Illinois

=== Transition ===
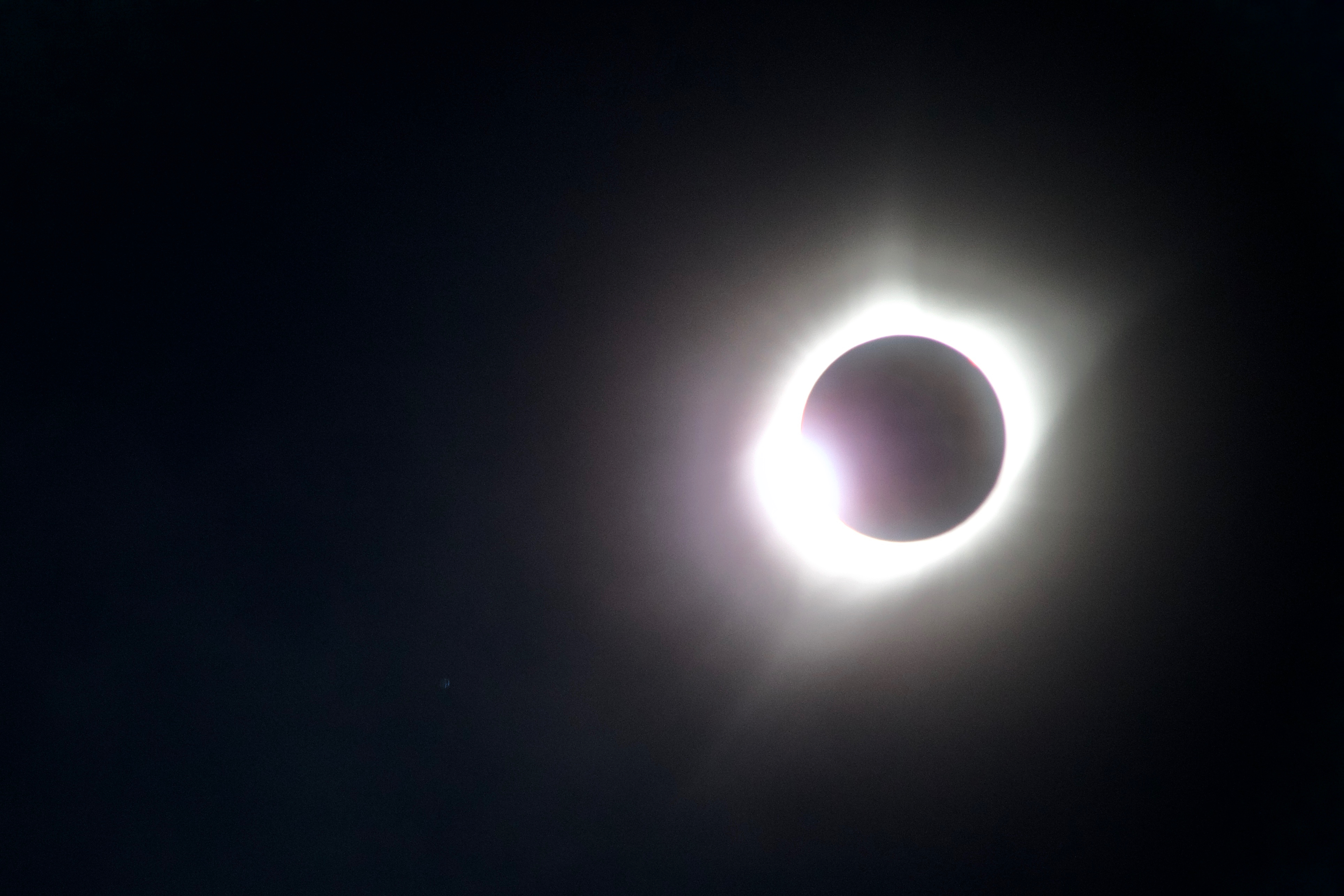
Beginning of Diamond ring as seen from Glenrock, Wyoming

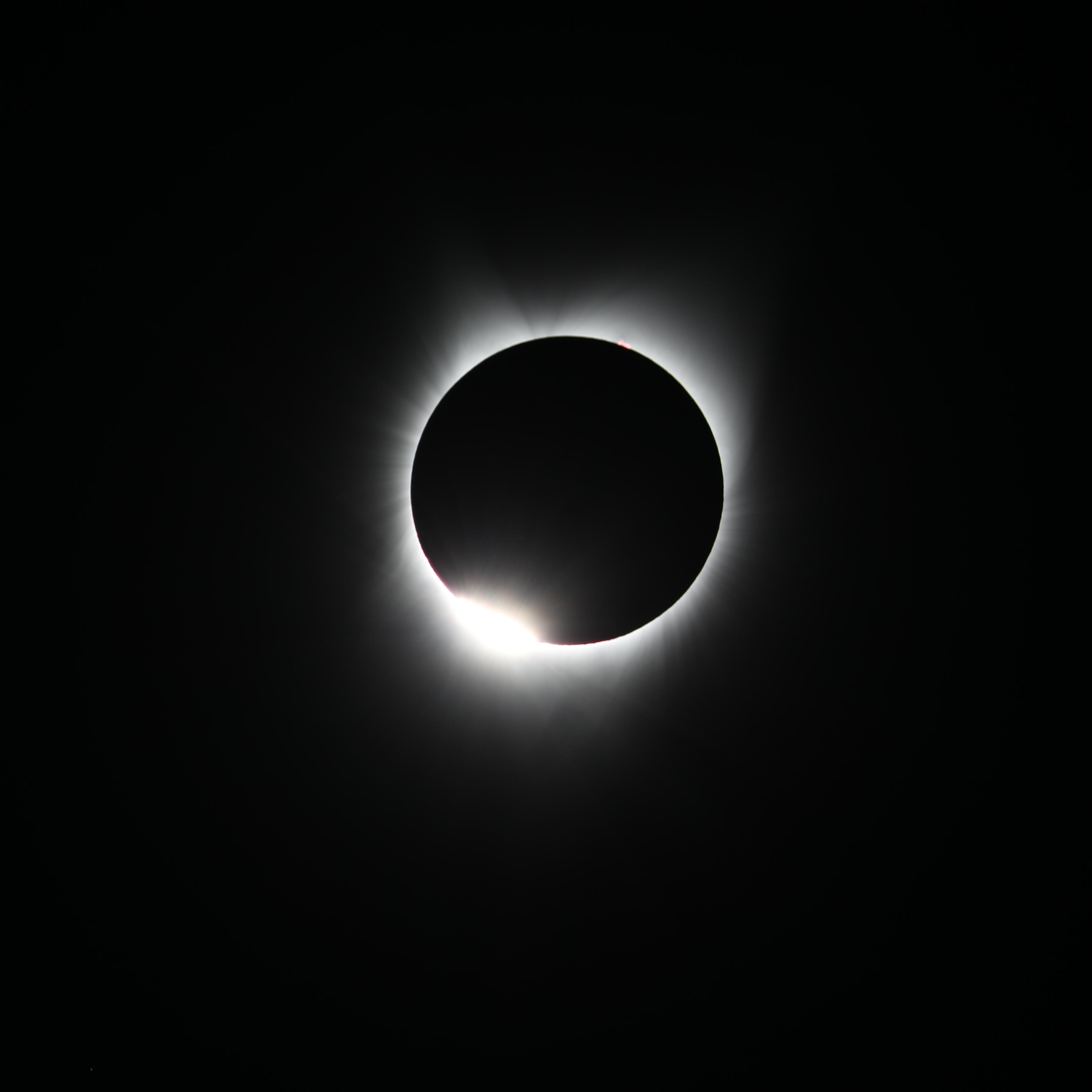
Diamond ring as seen from Jay Em, Wyoming

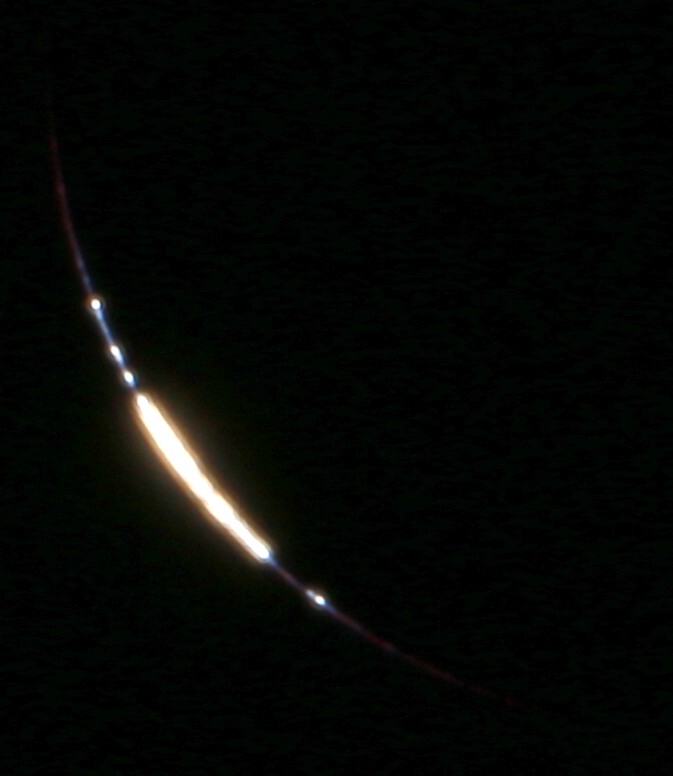
Baily's beads before totality from far western Nebraska

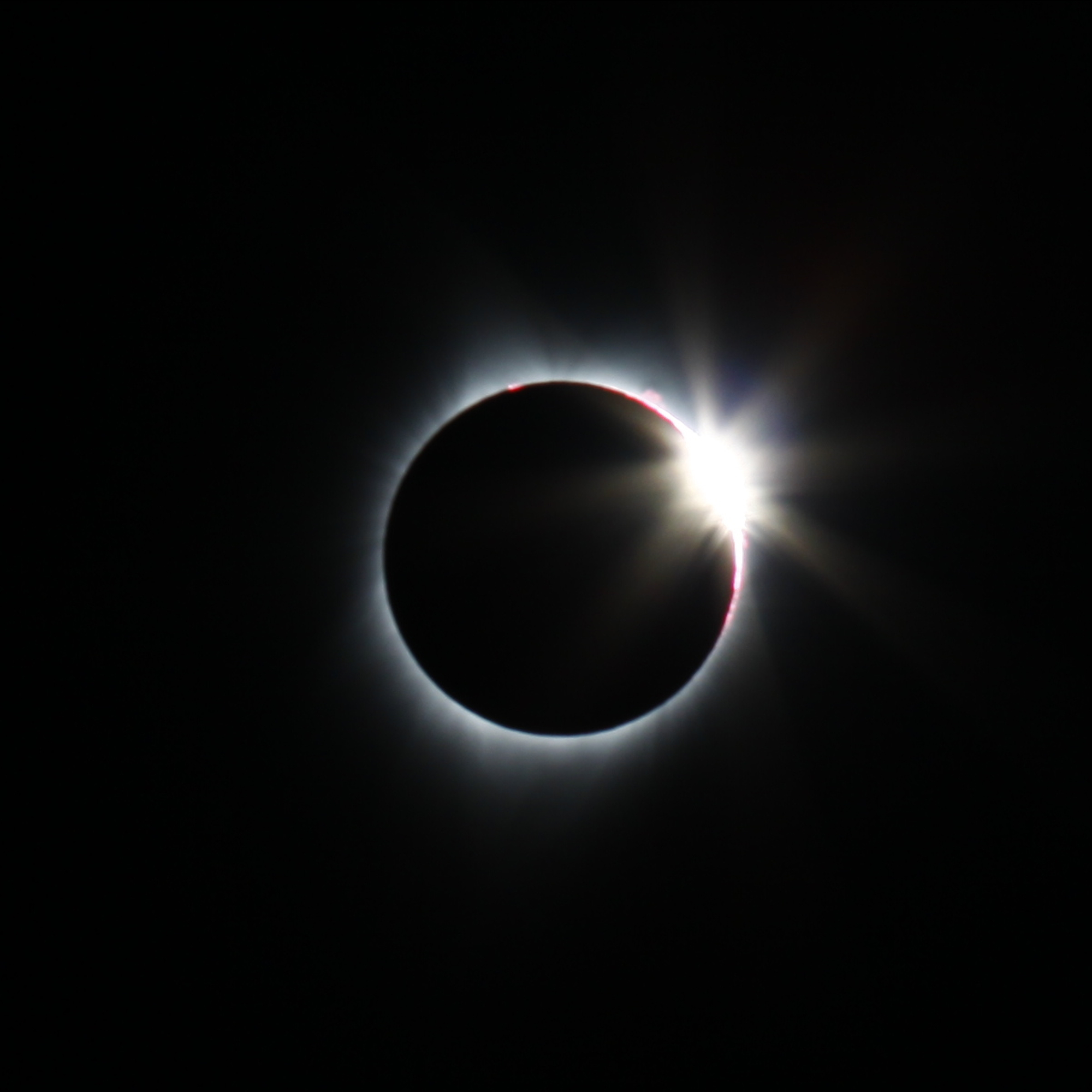
Diamond ring as seen from Corvallis, Oregon

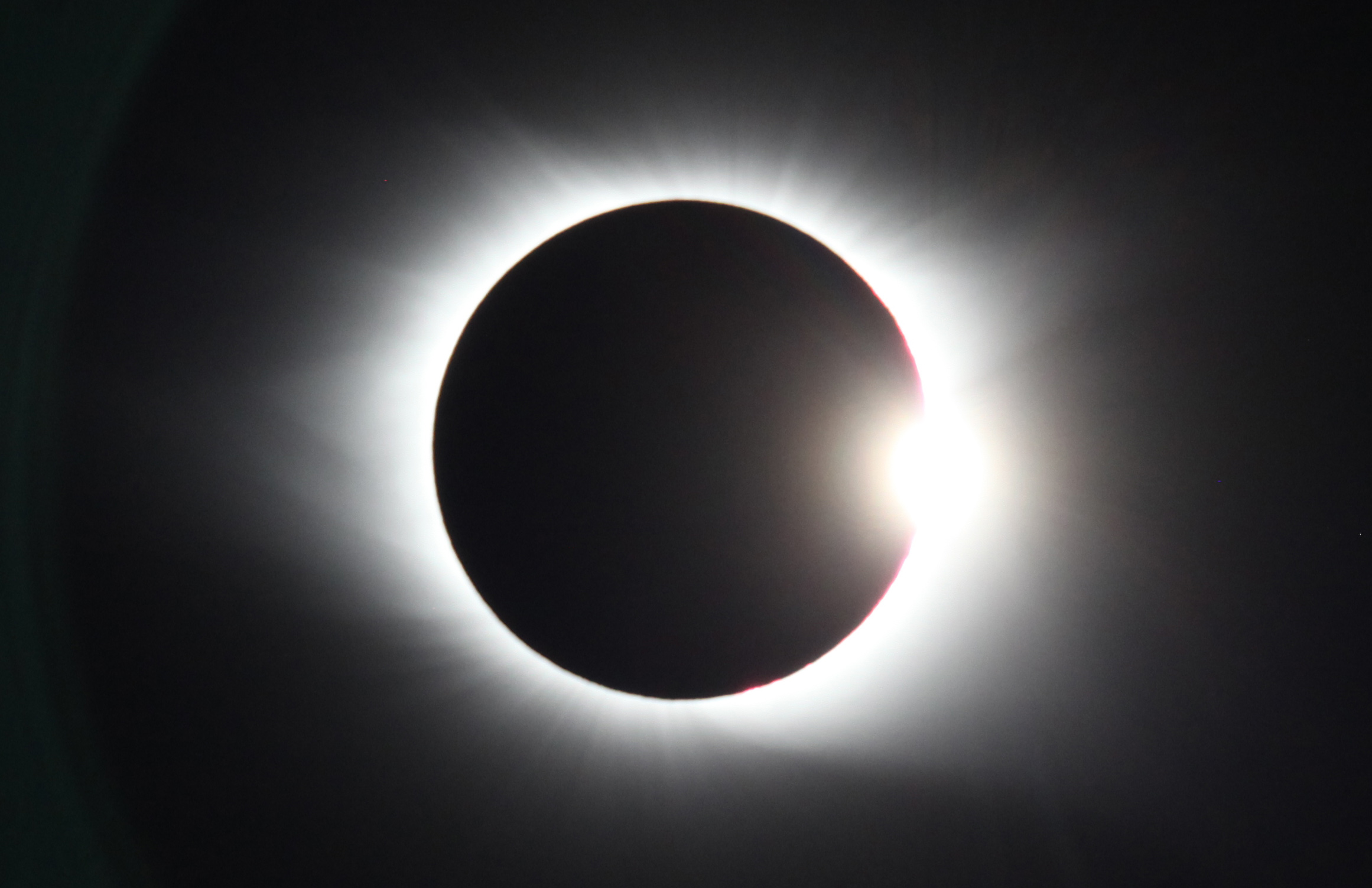
Diamond ring as seen from Saint Paul, South Carolina

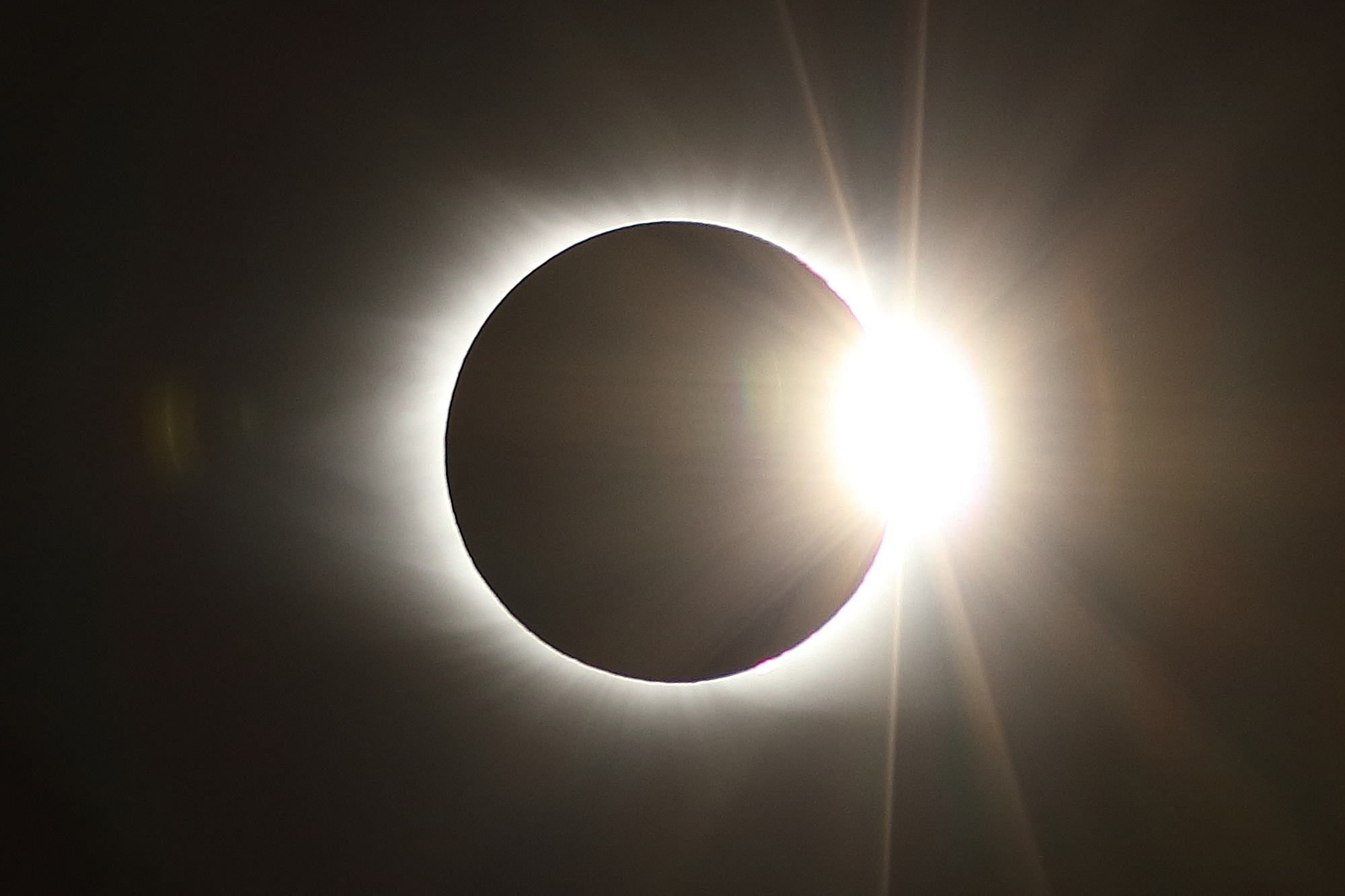
Diamond ring as seen from Newberry, South Carolina

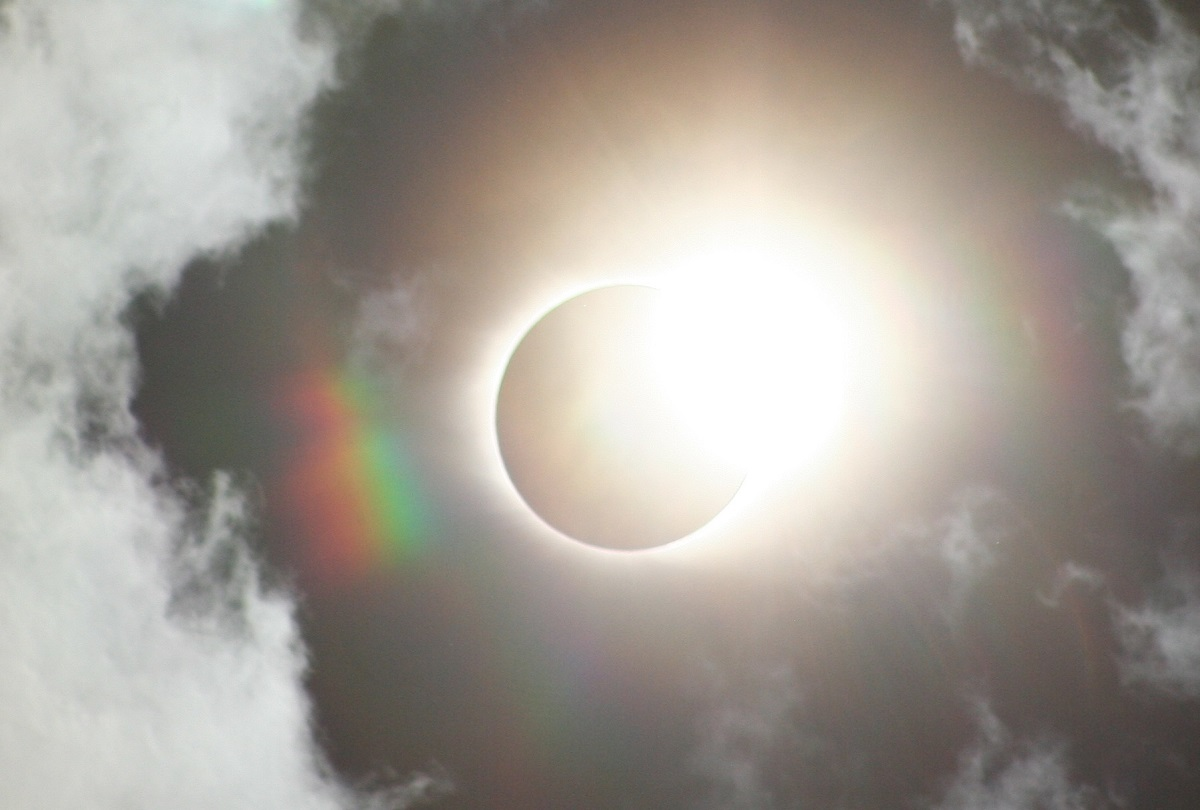
Diamond ring (with large flare) as seen from Cullowhee, NC

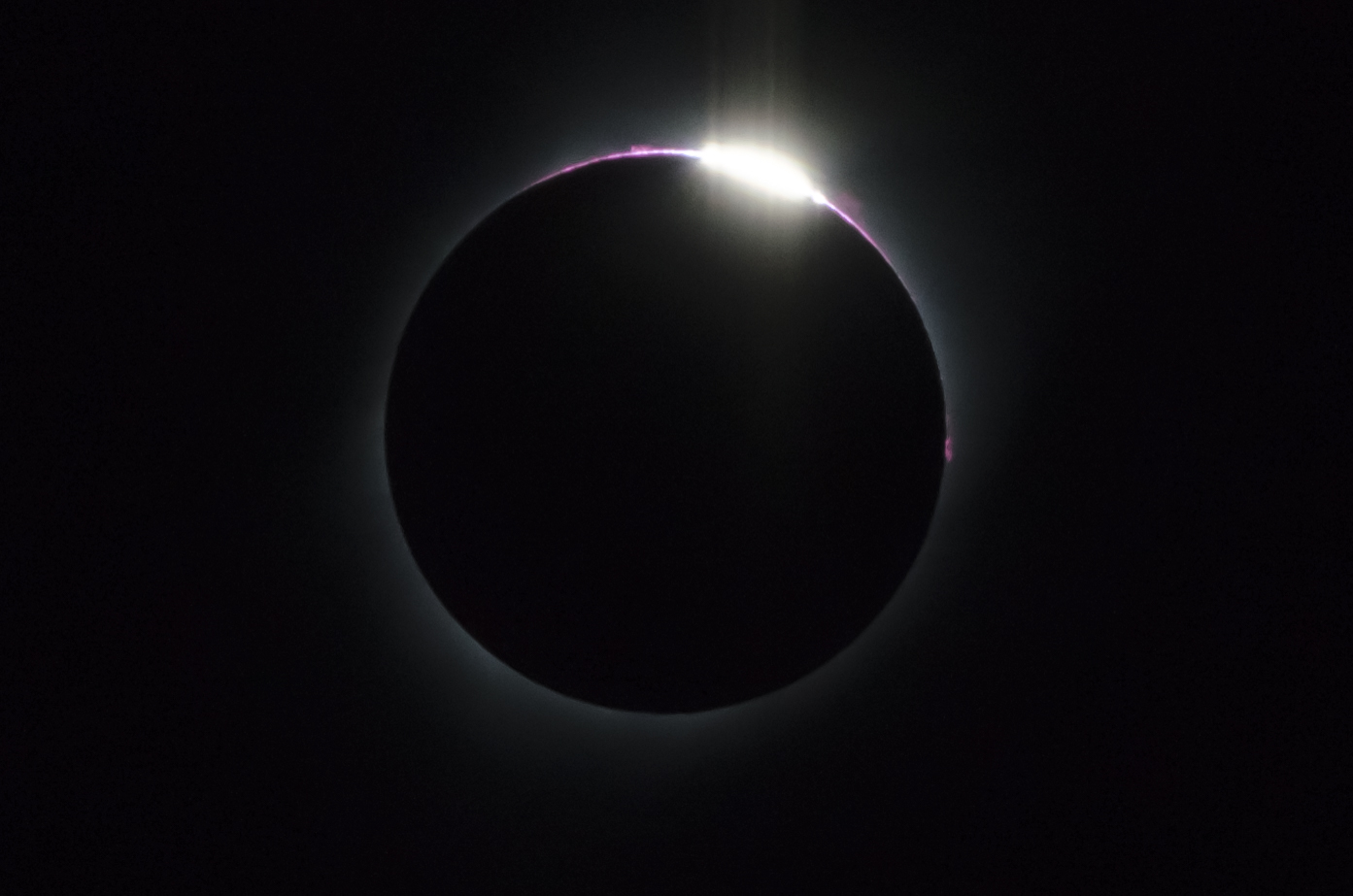
Diamond ring as seen from Grand Teton National Park, Wyoming

=== Partial ===
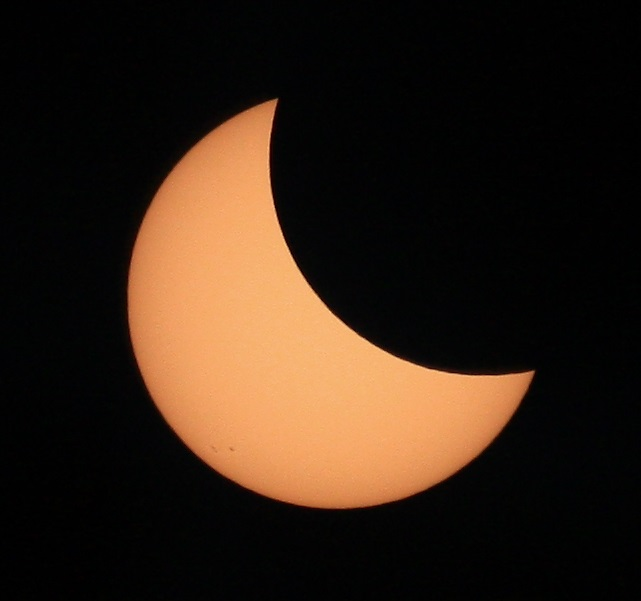
Seattle, Washington

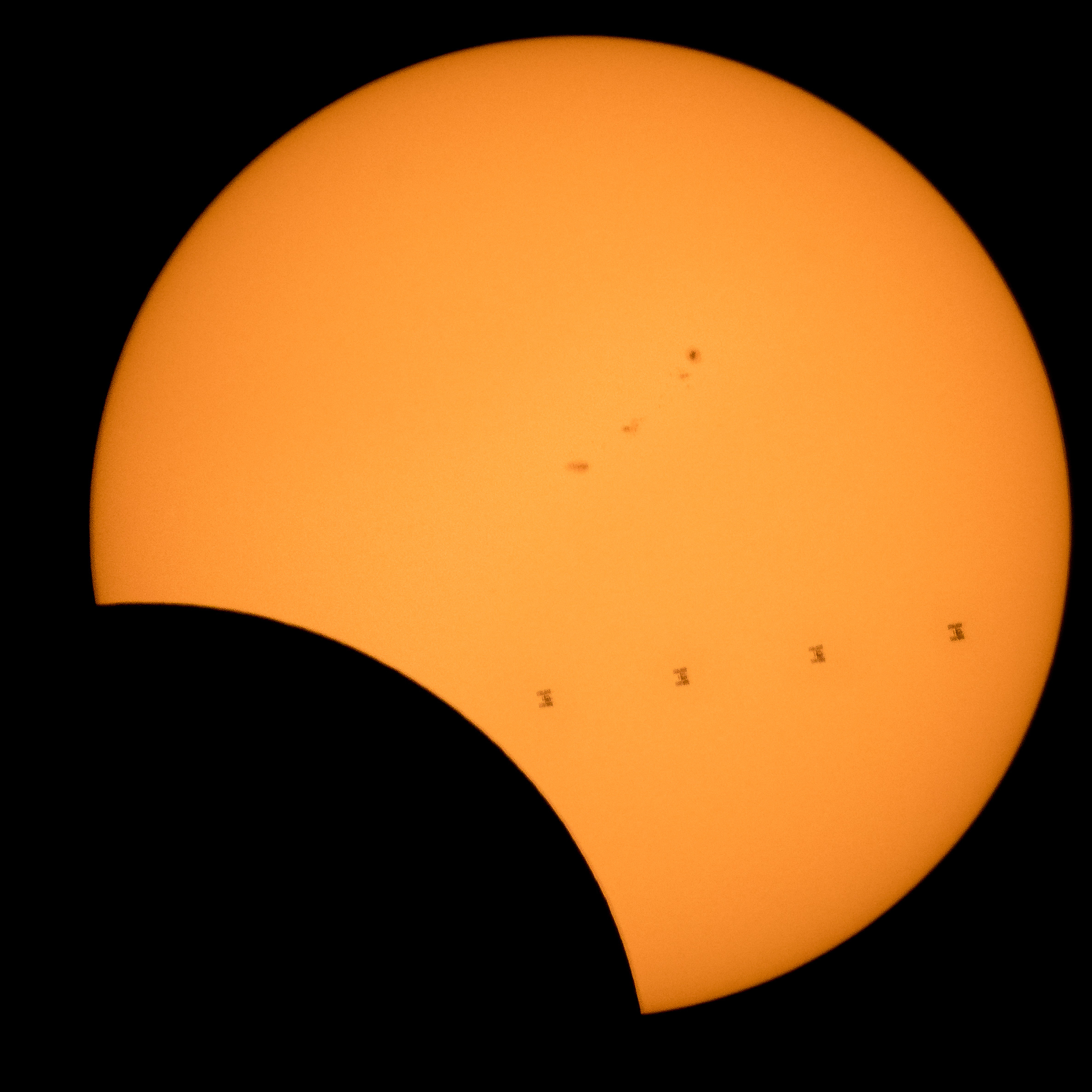
North Cascades National Park, Washington. The ISS is visible as it transits the Sun during the eclipse (4 frame composite image).

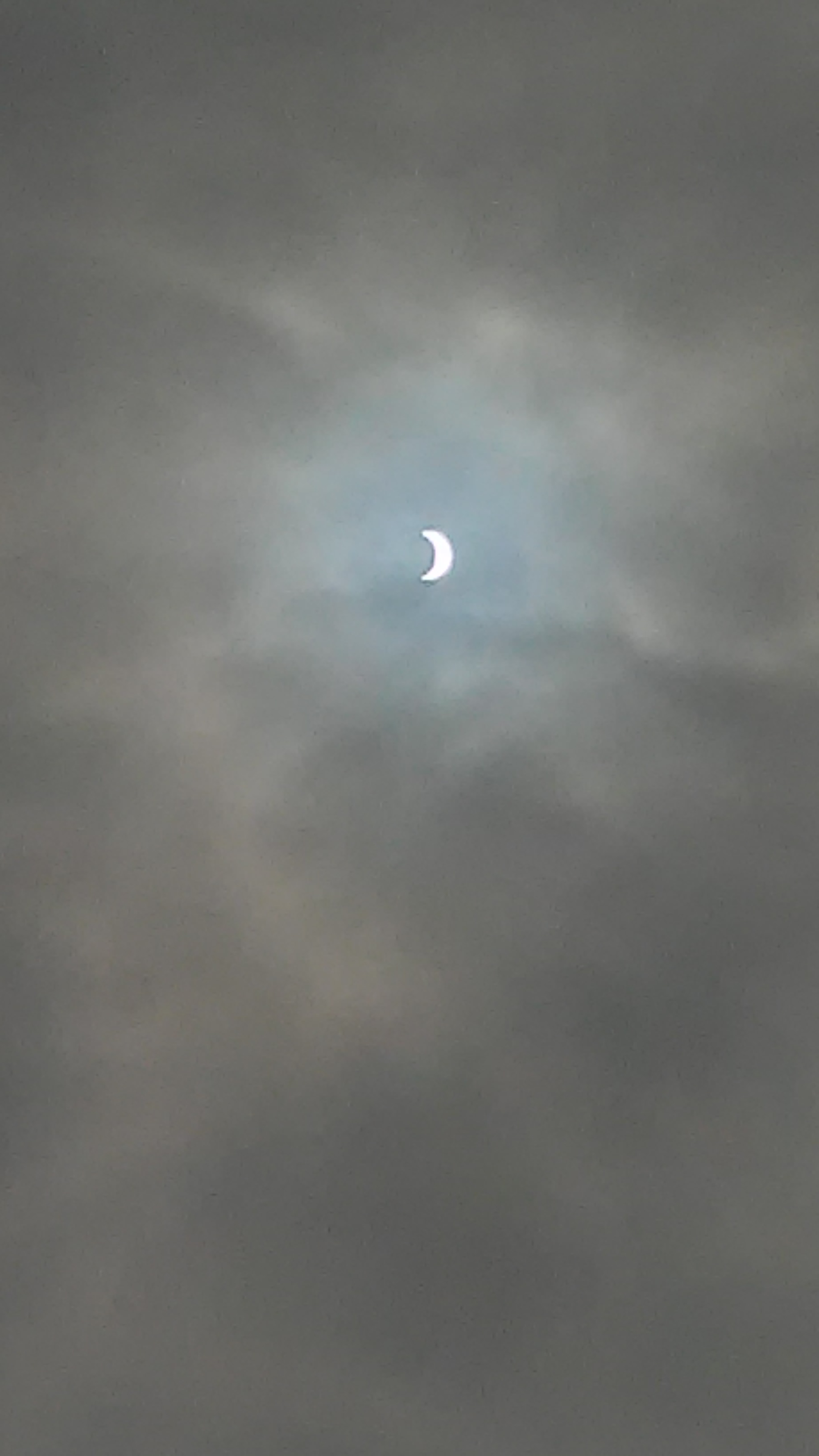
San Francisco, California

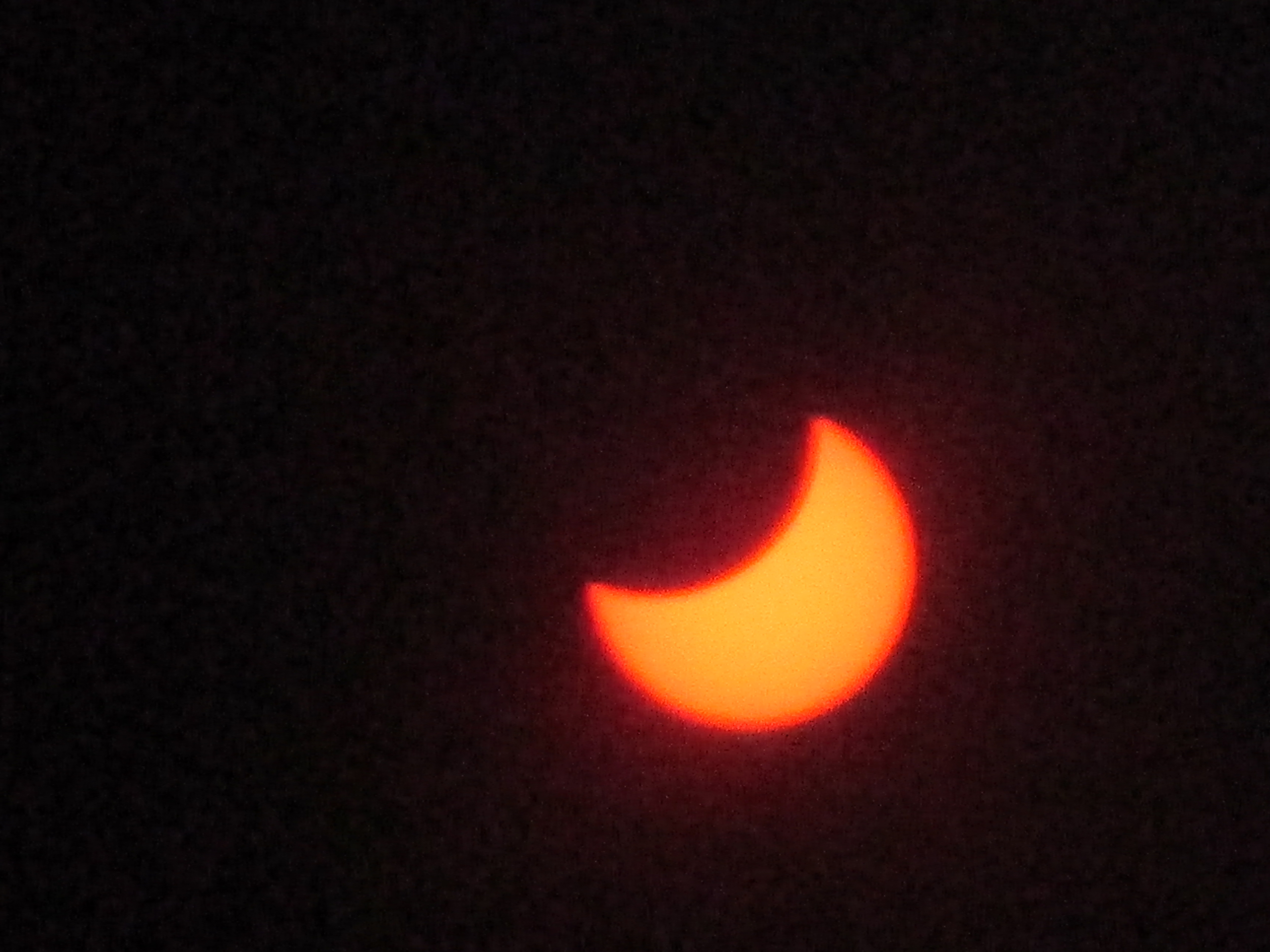
Mira Mesa in San Diego, California

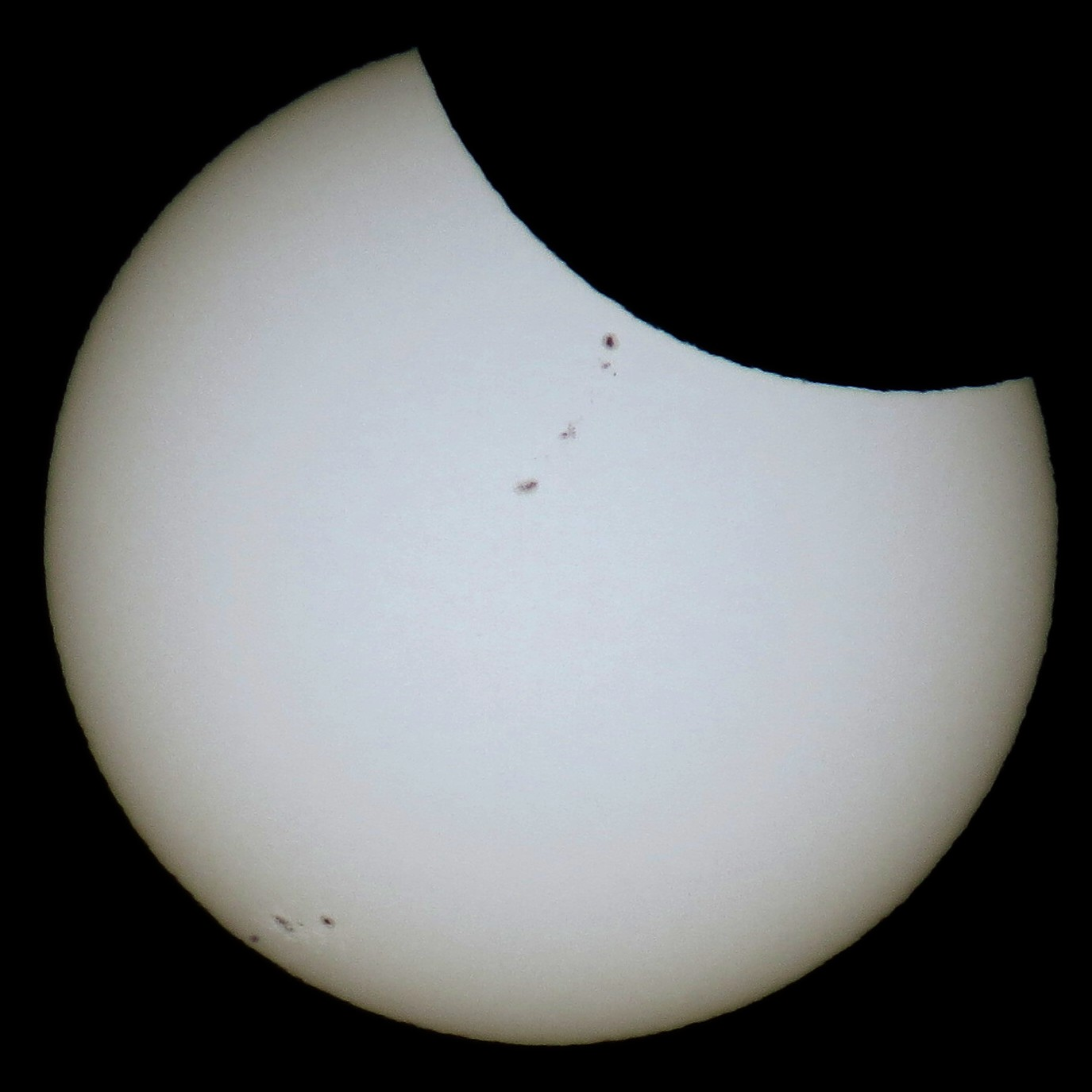
Far western Nebraska

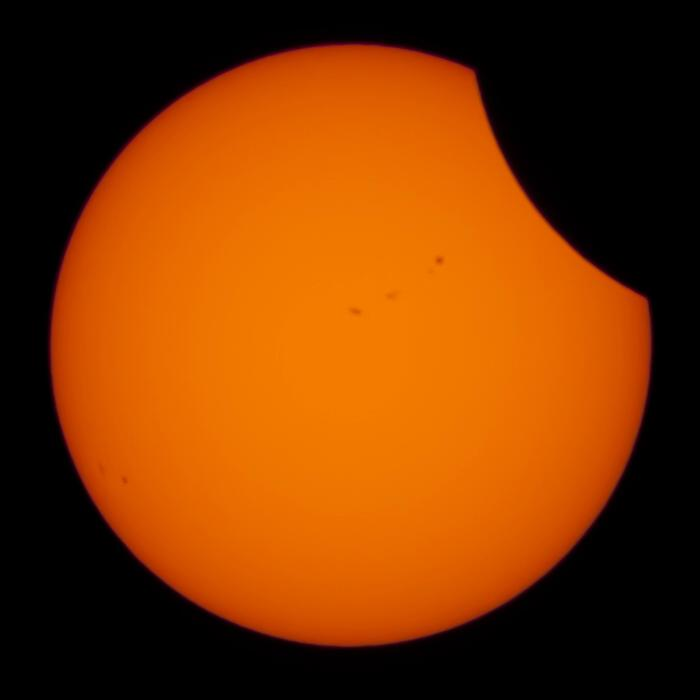
White House, Tennessee

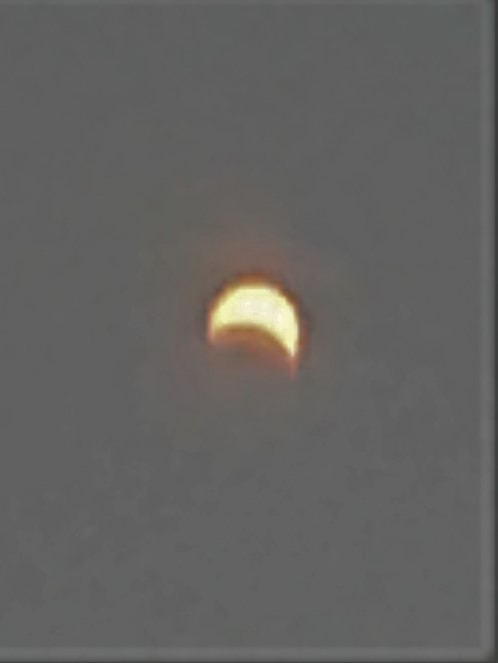
Maine at 2:41 p.m. EDT before maximum 68% coverage at 2:45 p.m.

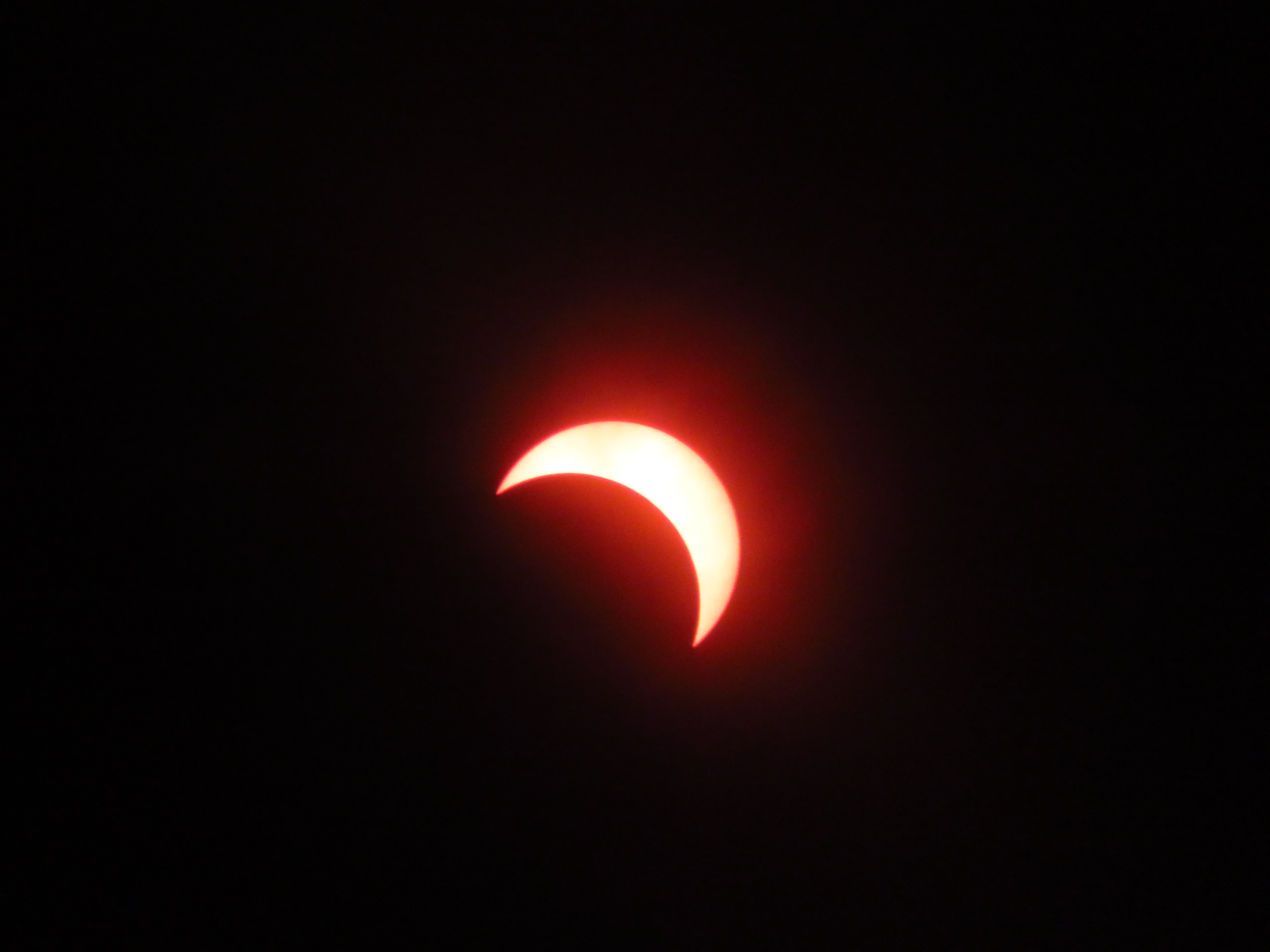
Brooklyn, New York

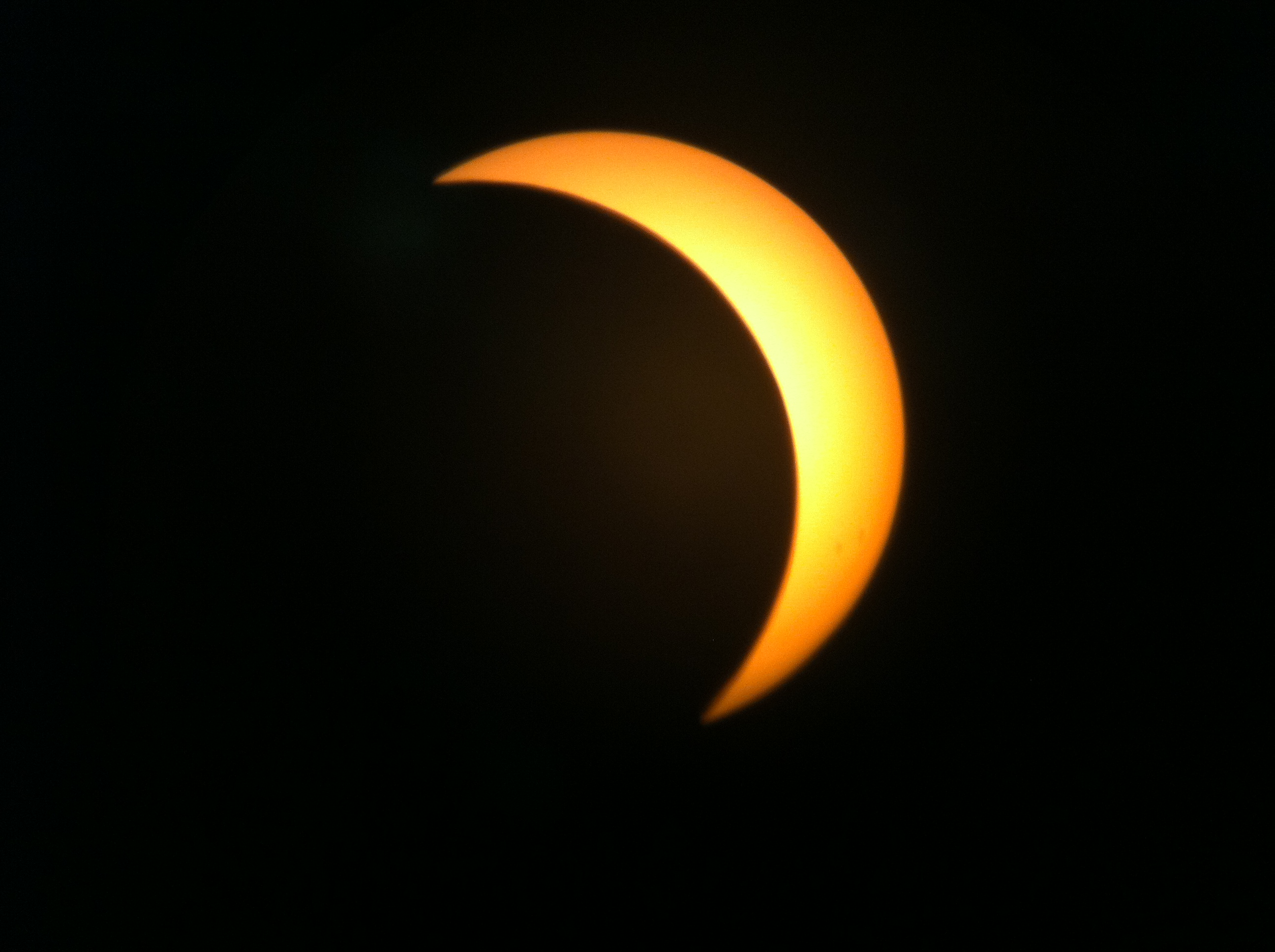
Ellicott City, Maryland shortly before maximum eclipse (~80%)

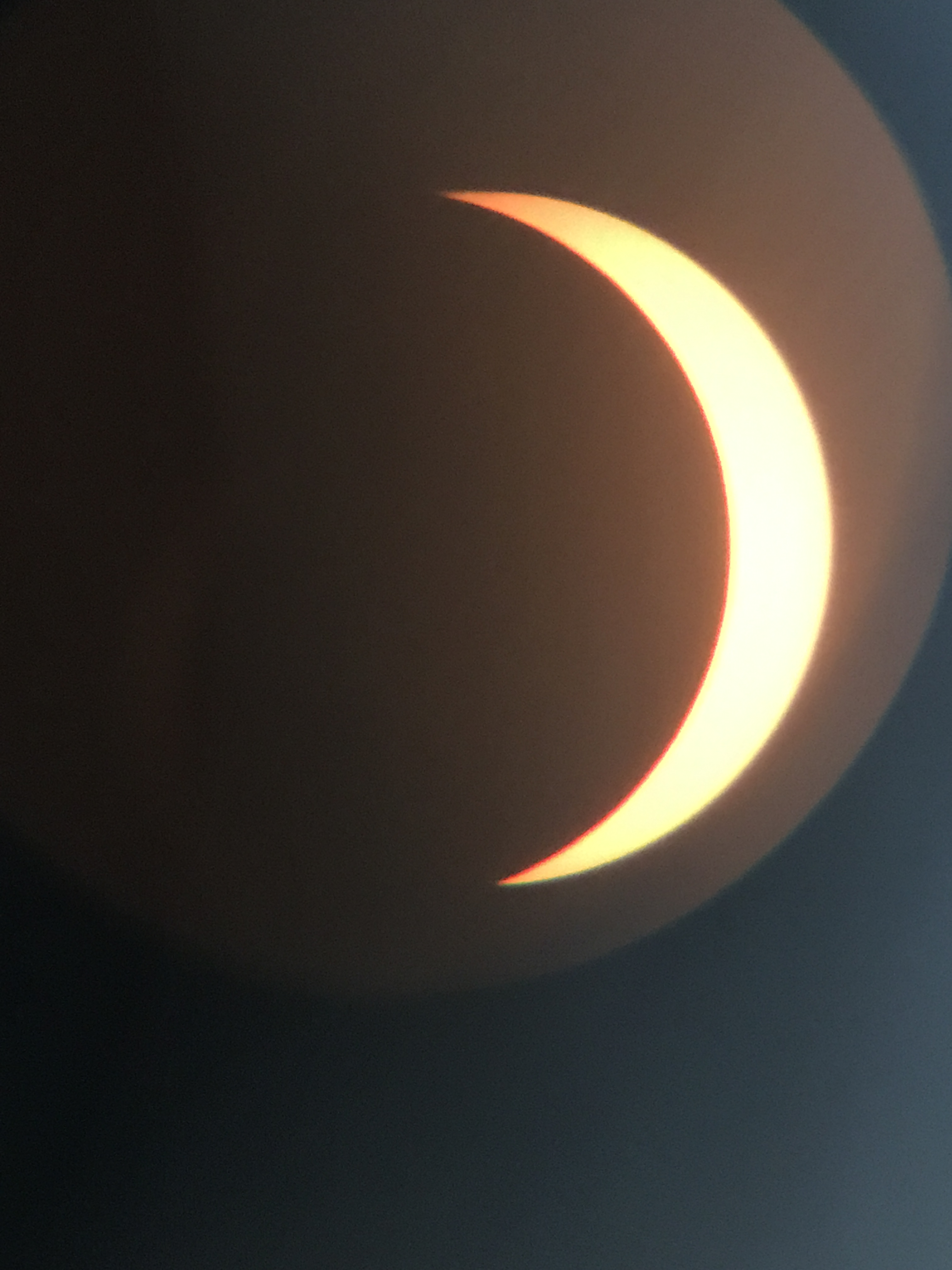
Virginia Beach, Virginia

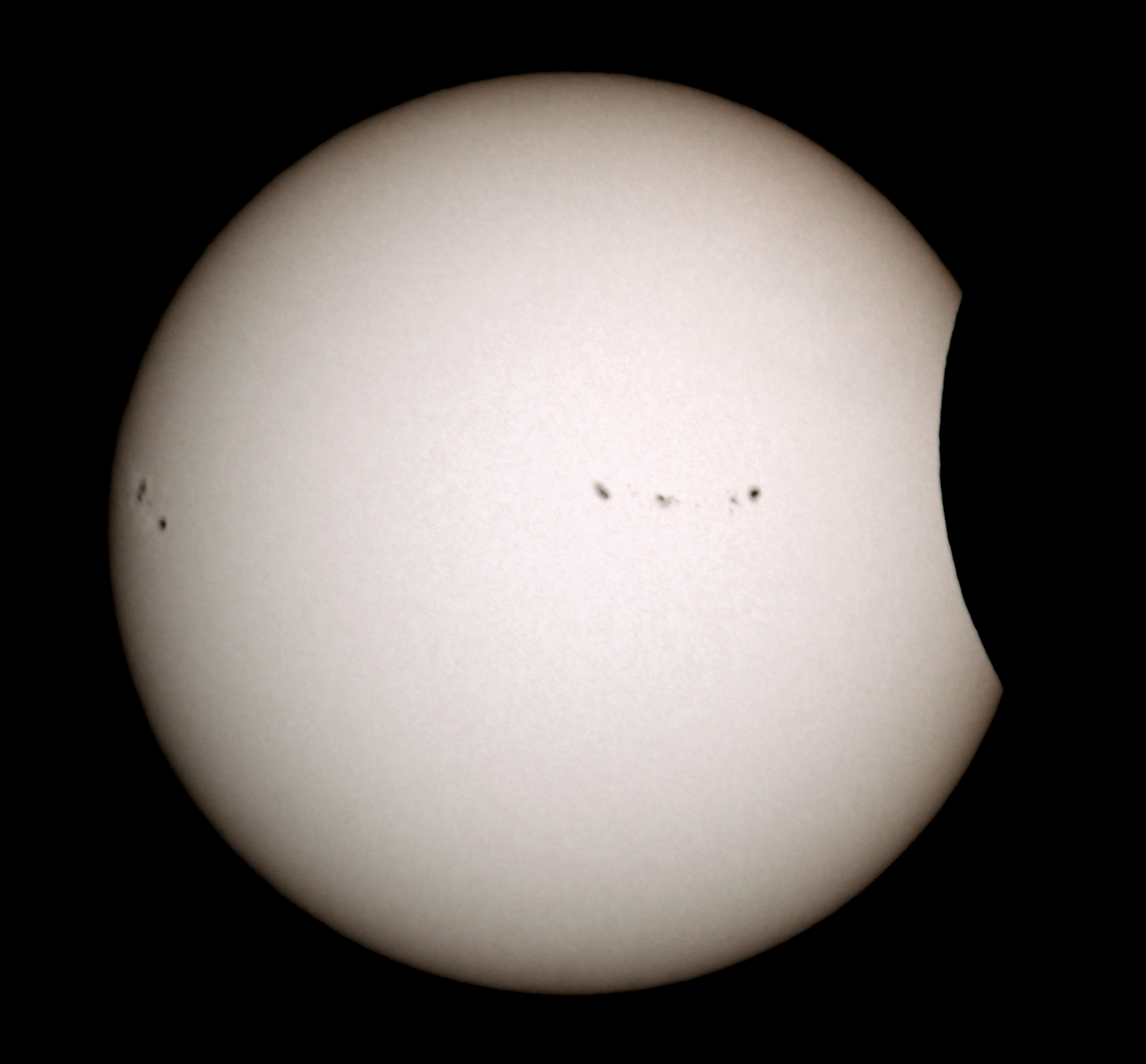
Simpsonville, South Carolina

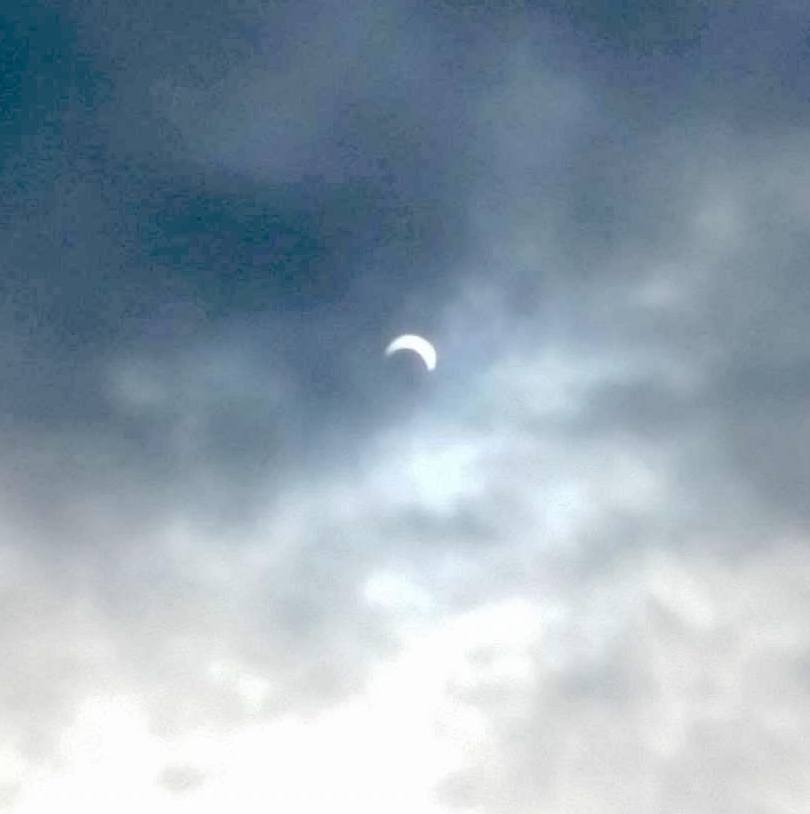
Paoli, Pennsylvania

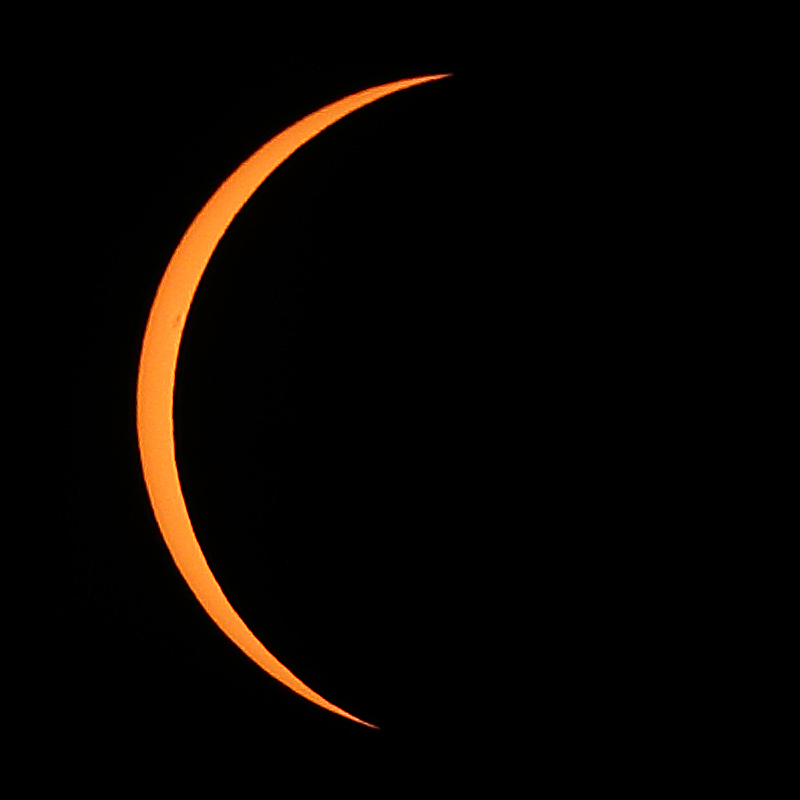
Newberry, South Carolina

=== Images produced by natural pinholes ===
(Images of the eclipse created by natural pinholes formed by tree leaves)

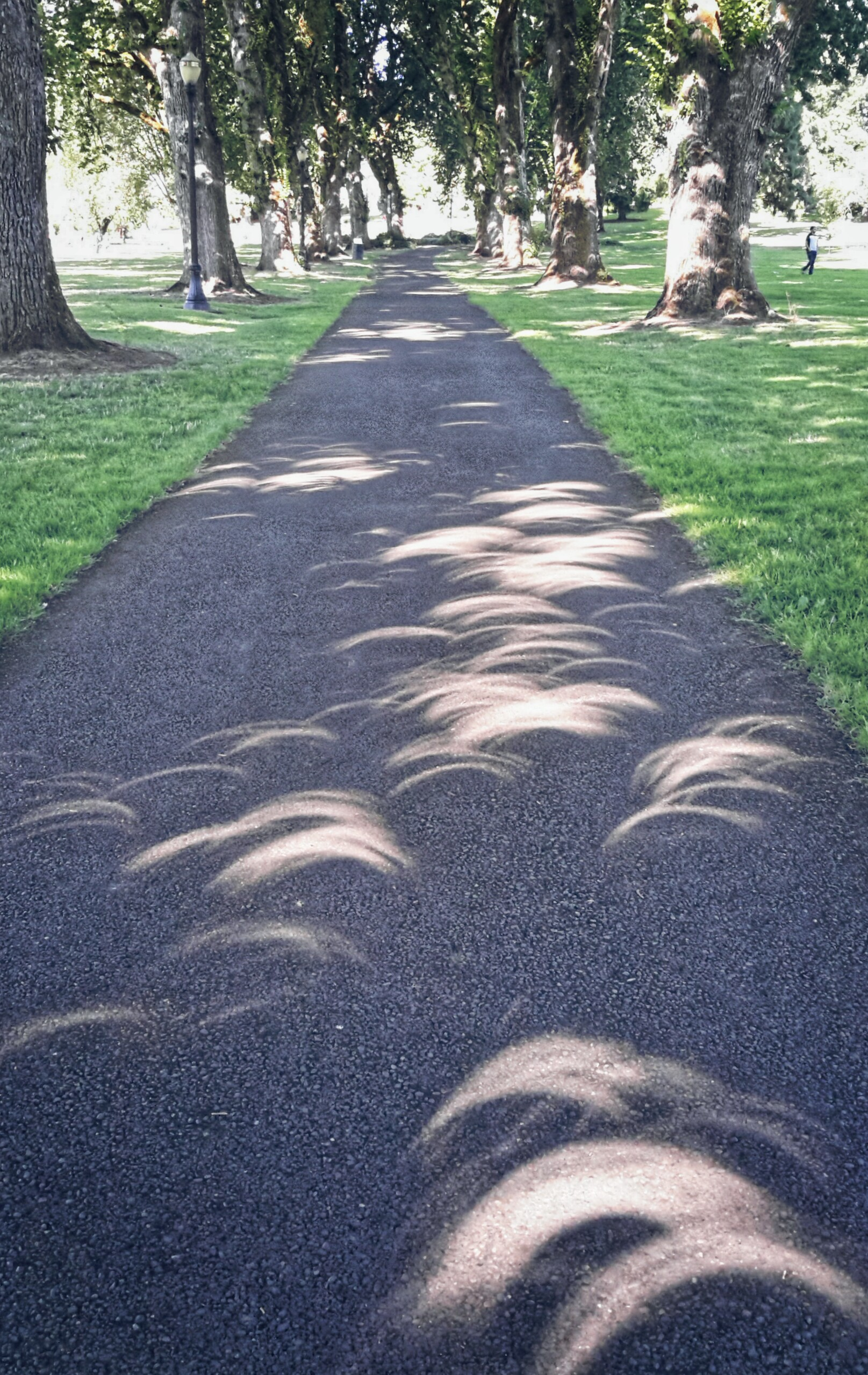
North Cascade mountains (British Columbia and Washington)

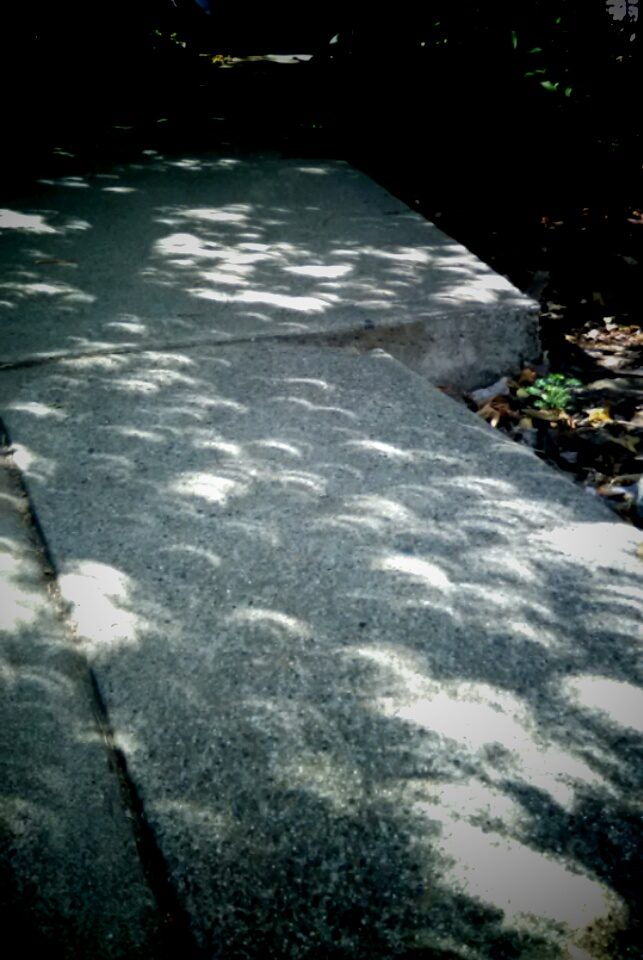
East Wenatchee, Washington

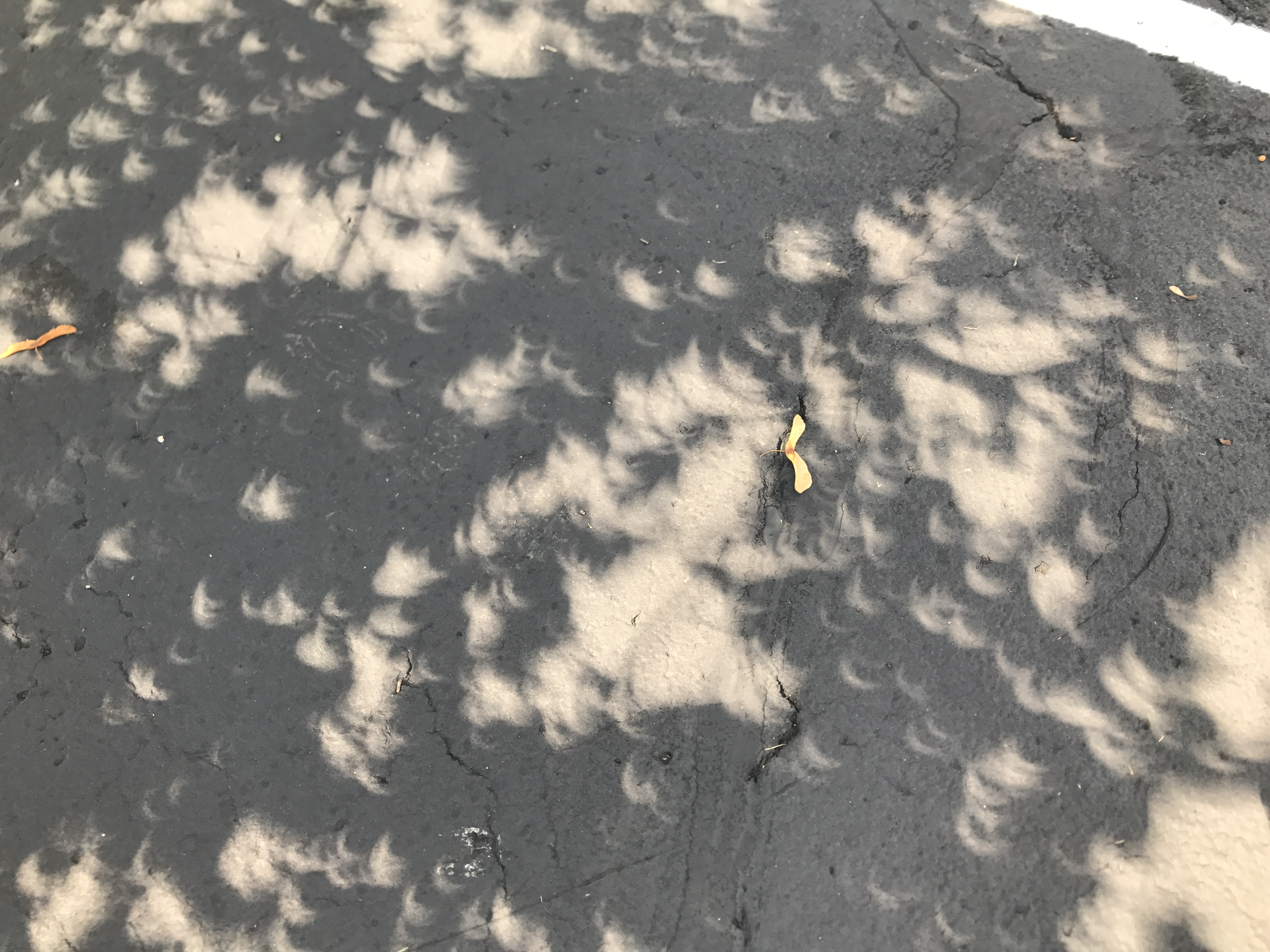
Moon, Pennsylvania

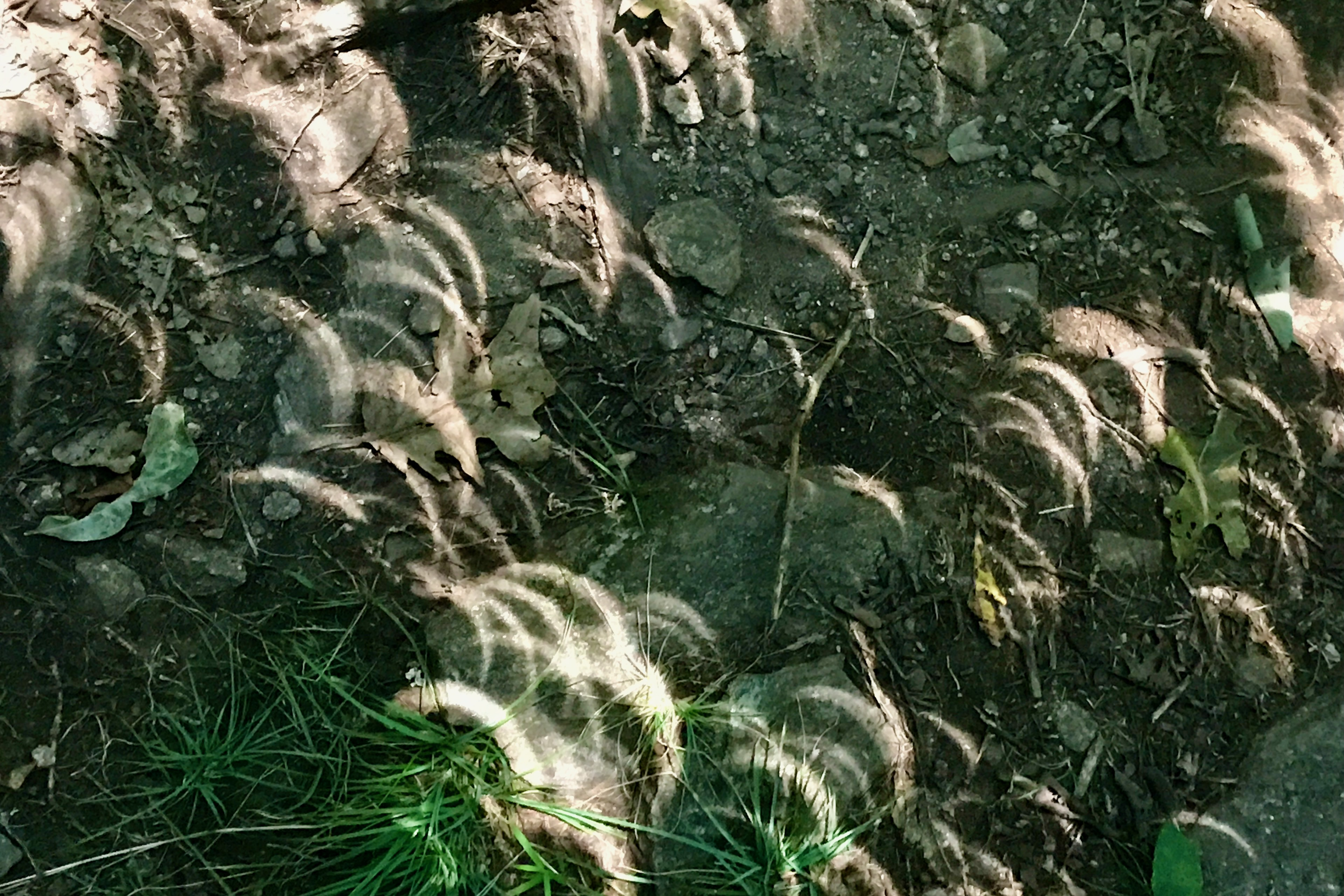
Cowrock Mountain, Georgia

=== Views outside of the US ===
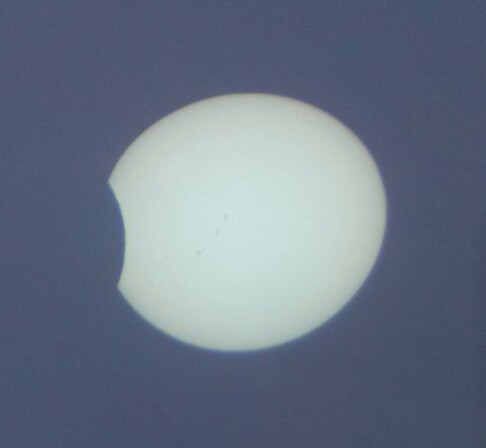
Photograph of the eclipse projected with binoculars in Puebla, Mexico

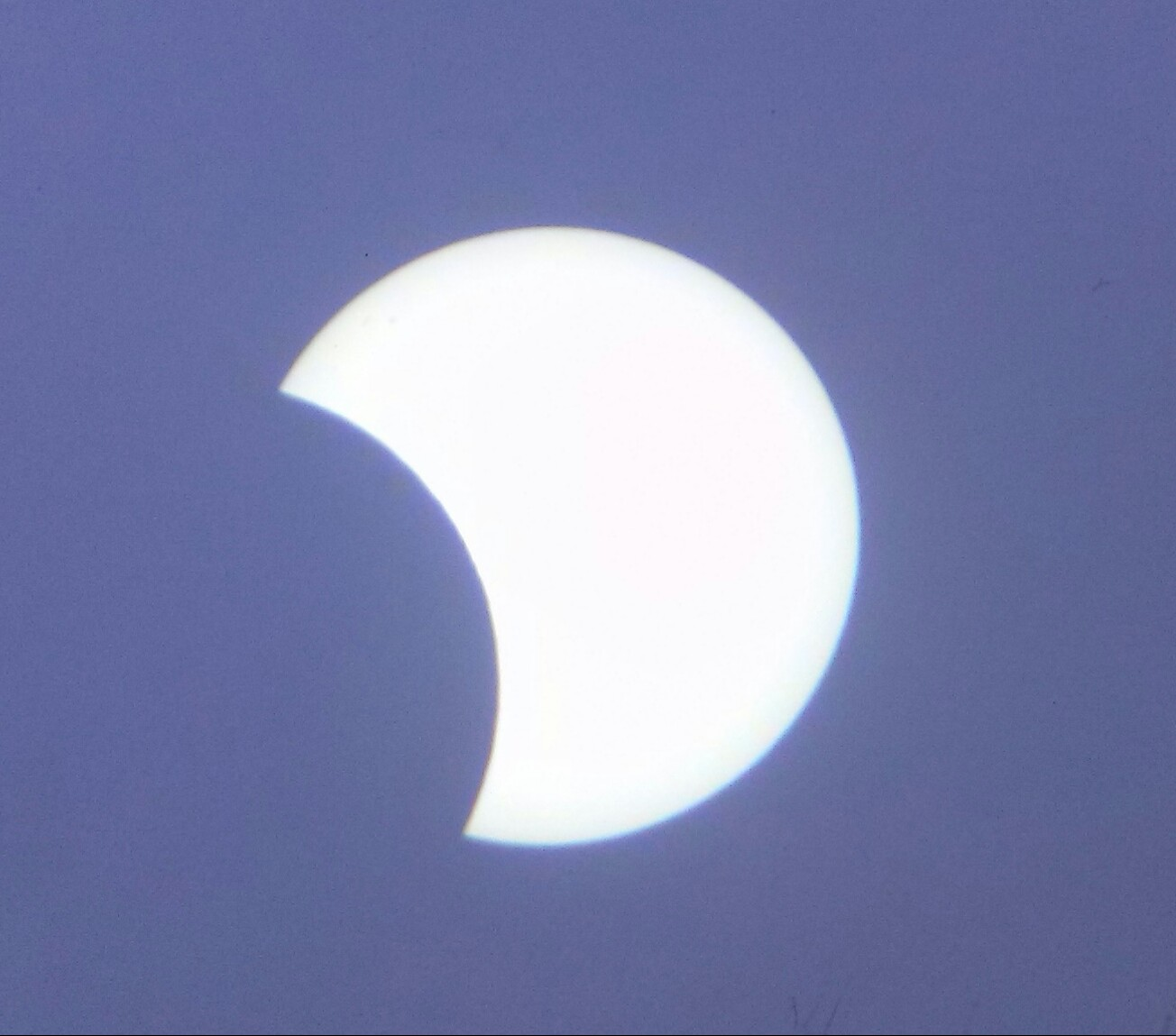
Photograph of the eclipse projected with binoculars in Puebla, Mexico

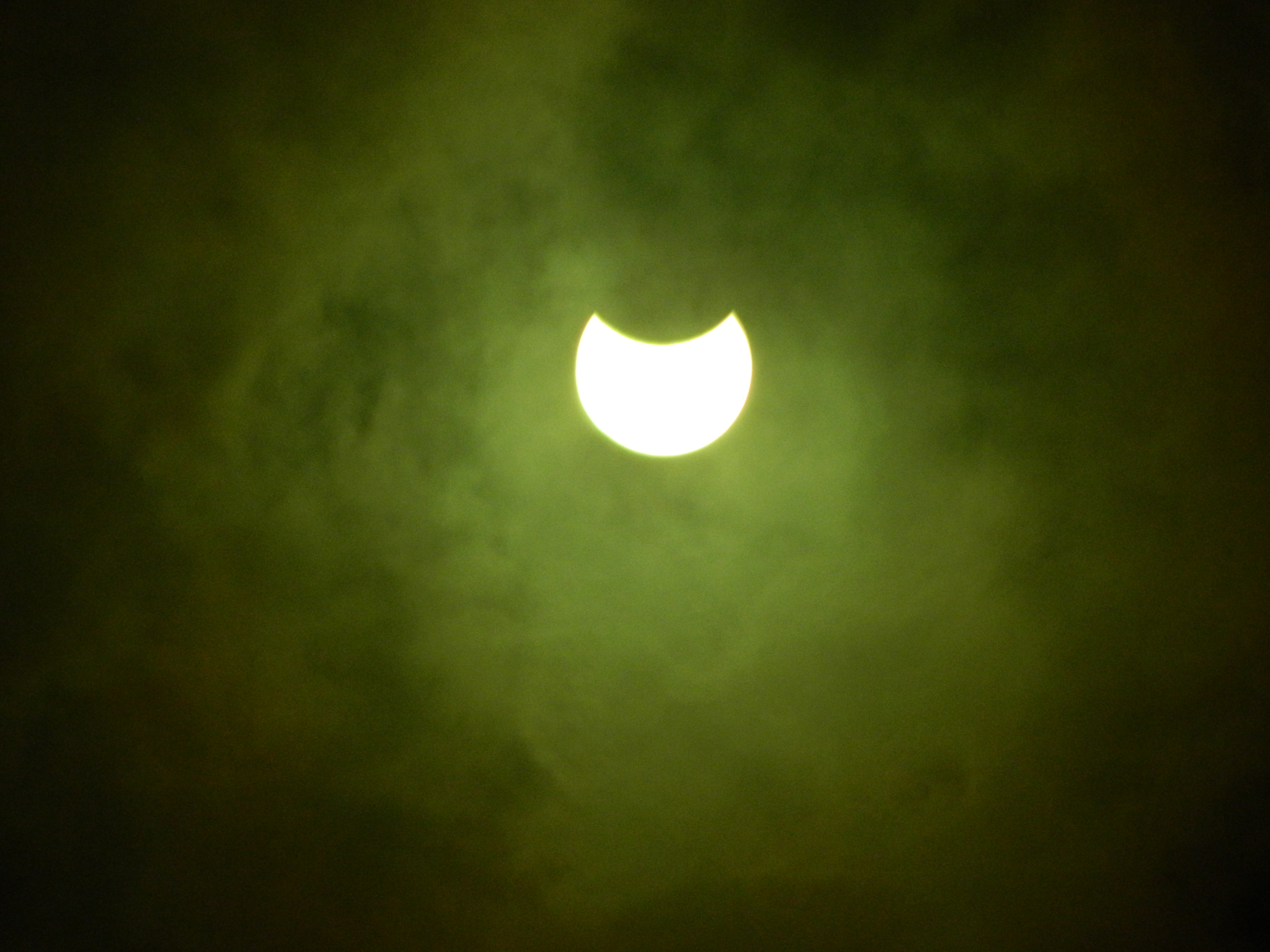
Tuxtla Gutierrez (Chiapas), Mexico at 12:36 GMT-6

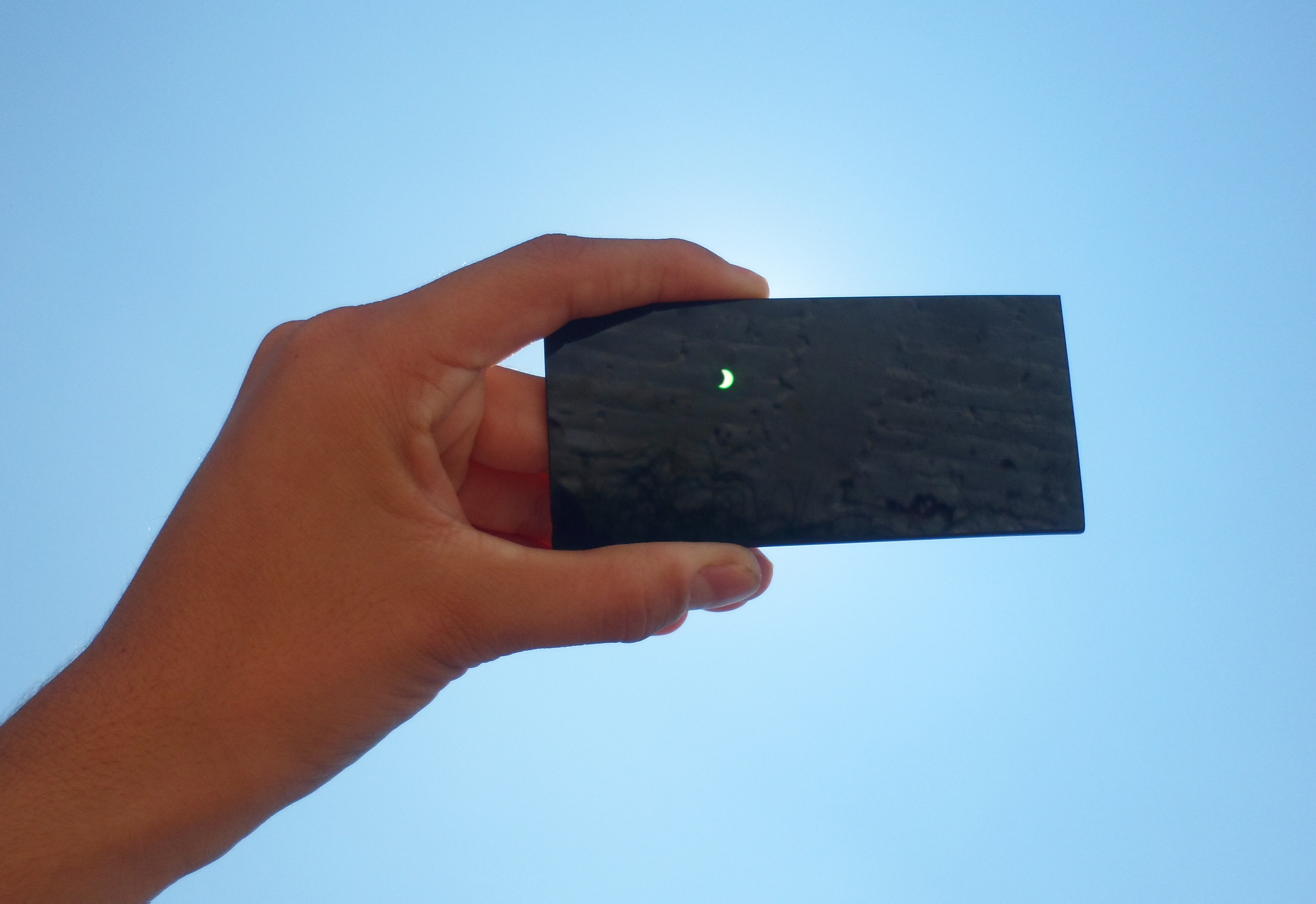
Chihuahua, Mexico at 11:40 a.m.

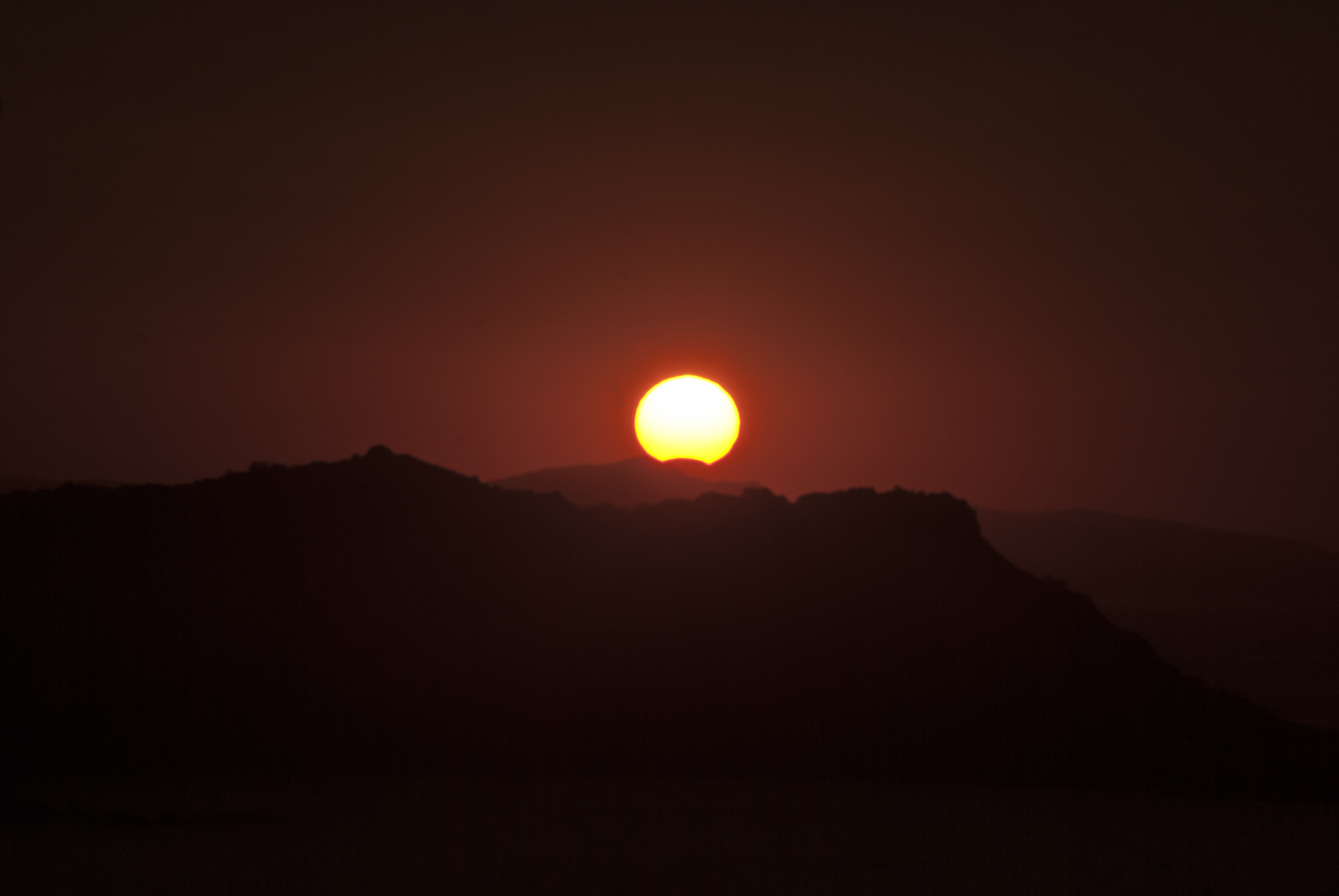
Sunset from Zarautz, Basque Country, Spain

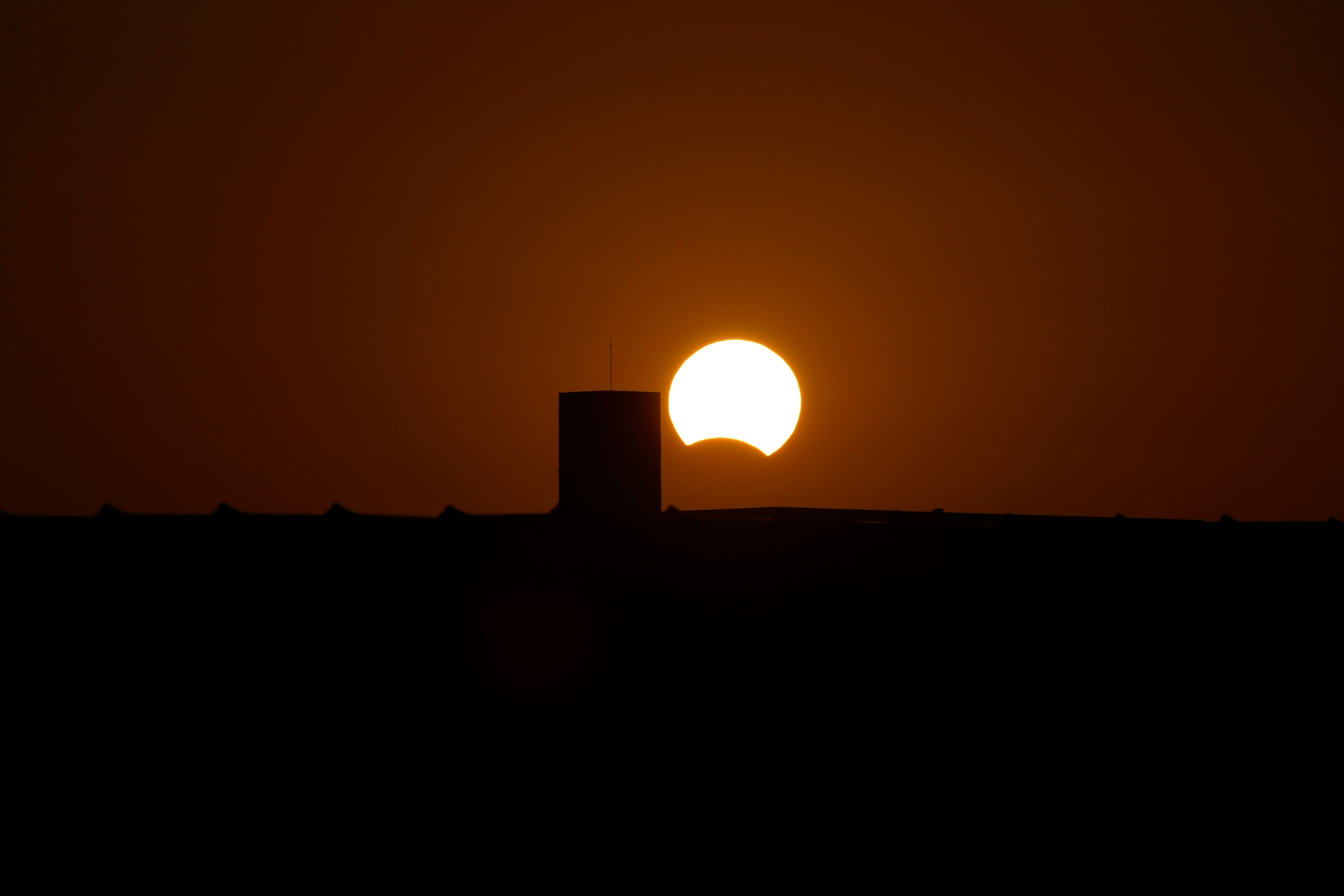
Sunset, viewed from Coimbra, Portugal

== Eclipse details ==
Shown below are two tables displaying details about this particular solar eclipse. The first table outlines times at which the Moon's penumbra or umbra attains the specific parameter, and the second table describes various other parameters pertaining to this eclipse.

August 21, 2017 Solar Eclipse Times
Event	Time (UTC)
First Penumbral External Contact	2017 August 21 at 15:47:59.9 UTC
First Umbral External Contact	2017 August 21 at 16:49:44.5 UTC
First Central Line	2017 August 21 at 16:50:14.5 UTC
First Umbral Internal Contact	2017 August 21 at 16:50:44.6 UTC
First Penumbral Internal Contact	2017 August 21 at 18:13:05.6 UTC
Equatorial Conjunction	2017 August 21 at 18:14:22.8 UTC
Greatest Duration	2017 August 21 at 18:22:57.5 UTC
Greatest Eclipse	2017 August 21 at 18:26:40.3 UTC
Ecliptic Conjunction	2017 August 21 at 18:31:19.6 UTC
Last Penumbral Internal Contact	2017 August 21 at 18:40:33.4 UTC
Last Umbral Internal Contact	2017 August 21 at 20:02:48.0 UTC
Last Central Line	2017 August 21 at 20:03:15.4 UTC
Last Umbral External Contact	2017 August 21 at 20:03:42.8 UTC
Last Penumbral External Contact	2017 August 21 at 21:05:31.9 UTC

August 21, 2017 Solar Eclipse Parameters
Parameter	Value
Eclipse Magnitude	1.03059
Eclipse Obscuration	1.06211
Gamma	0.43671
Sun Right Ascension	10h04m03.9s
Sun Declination	+11°51'43.0"
Sun Semi-Diameter	15'48.7"
Sun Equatorial Horizontal Parallax	08.7"
Moon Right Ascension	10h04m30.6s
Moon Declination	+12°16'32.8"
Moon Semi-Diameter	16'03.4"
Moon Equatorial Horizontal Parallax	0°58'55.7"
ΔT	68.8 s

== Eclipse season ==
This eclipse is part of an eclipse season, a period, roughly every six months, when eclipses occur. Only two (or occasionally three) eclipse seasons occur each year, and each season lasts about 35 days and repeats just short of six months (173 days) later; thus two full eclipse seasons always occur each year. Either two or three eclipses happen each eclipse season. In the sequence below, each eclipse is separated by a fortnight.

Eclipse season of August 2017
August 7 Descending node (full moon)	August 21 Ascending node (new moon)
Partial lunar eclipse Lunar Saros 119	Total solar eclipse Solar Saros 145

== Related eclipses ==
=== Eclipses in 2017 ===
- A penumbral lunar eclipse on February 11.
- An annular solar eclipse on February 26.
- A partial lunar eclipse on August 7.
- A total solar eclipse on August 21.

=== Metonic ===
- Preceded by: Solar eclipse of November 3, 2013
- Followed by: Solar eclipse of June 10, 2021

=== Tzolkinex ===
- Preceded by: Solar eclipse of July 11, 2010
- Followed by: Solar eclipse of October 2, 2024

=== Half-Saros ===
- Preceded by: Lunar eclipse of August 16, 2008
- Followed by: Lunar eclipse of August 28, 2026

=== Tritos ===
- Preceded by: Solar eclipse of September 22, 2006
- Followed by: Solar eclipse of July 22, 2028

=== Solar Saros 145 ===
- Preceded by: Solar eclipse of August 11, 1999
- Followed by: Solar eclipse of September 2, 2035

=== Inex ===
- Preceded by: Solar eclipse of September 11, 1988
- Followed by: Solar eclipse of August 2, 2046

=== Triad ===
- Preceded by: Solar eclipse of October 21, 1930
- Followed by: Solar eclipse of June 22, 2104

=== Solar eclipses of 2015–2018 ===
This eclipse is a member of a semester series. An eclipse in a semester series of solar eclipses repeats approximately every 177 days and 4 hours (a semester) at alternating nodes of the Moon's orbit.

The partial solar eclipse on July 13, 2018 occurs in the next lunar year eclipse set.

Solar eclipse series sets from 2015 to 2018
Descending node			Ascending node		
Saros	Map	Gamma	Saros	Map	Gamma
120 Totality in Longyearbyen, Svalbard	March 20, 2015 Total	0.94536	125 Solar Dynamics Observatory	September 13, 2015 Partial	−1.10039
130 Balikpapan, Indonesia	March 9, 2016 Total	0.26092	135 Annularity in L'Étang-Salé, Réunion	September 1, 2016 Annular	−0.33301
140 Partial from Buenos Aires, Argentina	February 26, 2017 Annular	−0.45780	145 Totality in Madras, OR, USA	August 21, 2017 Total	0.43671
150 Partial in Olivos, Buenos Aires, Argentina	February 15, 2018 Partial	−1.21163	155 Partial in Huittinen, Finland	August 11, 2018 Partial	1.14758

=== Saros 145 ===
This eclipse is a part of Saros series 145, repeating every 18 years, 11 days, and containing 77 events. The series started with a partial solar eclipse on January 4, 1639. It contains an annular eclipse on June 6, 1891; a hybrid eclipse on June 17, 1909; and total eclipses from June 29, 1927 through September 9, 2648. The series ends at member 77 as a partial eclipse on April 17, 3009. Its eclipses are tabulated in three columns; every third eclipse in the same column is one exeligmos apart, so they all cast shadows over approximately the same parts of the Earth.

The longest duration of annularity was produced by member 15 at 6 seconds (by default) on June 6, 1891, and the longest duration of totality will be produced by member 50 at 7 minutes, 12 seconds on June 25, 2522. All eclipses in this series occur at the Moon’s ascending node of orbit.

Series members 10–32 occur between 1801 and 2200:
10	11	12
April 13, 1801	April 24, 1819	May 4, 1837
13	14	15
May 16, 1855	May 26, 1873	June 6, 1891
16	17	18
June 17, 1909	June 29, 1927	July 9, 1945
19	20	21
July 20, 1963	July 31, 1981	August 11, 1999
22	23	24
August 21, 2017	September 2, 2035	September 12, 2053
25	26	27
September 23, 2071	October 4, 2089	October 16, 2107
28	29	30
October 26, 2125	November 7, 2143	November 17, 2161
31	32	
November 28, 2179	December 9, 2197	

=== Metonic series ===
The metonic series repeats eclipses every 19 years (6939.69 days), lasting about 5 cycles. Eclipses occur in nearly the same calendar date. In addition, the octon subseries repeats 1/5 of that or every 3.8 years (1387.94 days). All eclipses in this table occur at the Moon's ascending node.

20 eclipse events between June 10, 1964 and August 21, 2036
June 10–11	March 28–29	January 14–16	November 3	August 21–22
117	119	121	123	125
June 10, 1964	March 28, 1968	January 16, 1972	November 3, 1975	August 22, 1979
127	129	131	133	135
June 11, 1983	March 29, 1987	January 15, 1991	November 3, 1994	August 22, 1998
137	139	141	143	145
June 10, 2002	March 29, 2006	January 15, 2010	November 3, 2013	August 21, 2017
147	149	151	153	155
June 10, 2021	March 29, 2025	January 14, 2029	November 3, 2032	August 21, 2036

=== Tritos series ===
This eclipse is a part of a tritos cycle, repeating at alternating nodes every 135 synodic months (≈ 3986.63 days, or 11 years minus 1 month). Their appearance and longitude are irregular due to a lack of synchronization with the anomalistic month (period of perigee), but groupings of 3 tritos cycles (≈ 33 years minus 3 months) come close (≈ 434.044 anomalistic months), so eclipses are similar in these groupings.

Series members between 1801 and 2200
April 4, 1810 (Saros 126)	March 4, 1821 (Saros 127)	February 1, 1832 (Saros 128)	December 31, 1842 (Saros 129)	November 30, 1853 (Saros 130)
October 30, 1864 (Saros 131)	September 29, 1875 (Saros 132)	August 29, 1886 (Saros 133)	July 29, 1897 (Saros 134)	June 28, 1908 (Saros 135)
May 29, 1919 (Saros 136)	April 28, 1930 (Saros 137)	March 27, 1941 (Saros 138)	February 25, 1952 (Saros 139)	January 25, 1963 (Saros 140)
December 24, 1973 (Saros 141)	November 22, 1984 (Saros 142)	October 24, 1995 (Saros 143)	September 22, 2006 (Saros 144)	August 21, 2017 (Saros 145)
July 22, 2028 (Saros 146)	June 21, 2039 (Saros 147)	May 20, 2050 (Saros 148)	April 20, 2061 (Saros 149)	March 19, 2072 (Saros 150)
February 16, 2083 (Saros 151)	January 16, 2094 (Saros 152)	December 17, 2104 (Saros 153)	November 16, 2115 (Saros 154)	October 16, 2126 (Saros 155)
September 15, 2137 (Saros 156)	August 14, 2148 (Saros 157)	July 15, 2159 (Saros 158)	June 14, 2170 (Saros 159)	May 13, 2181 (Saros 160)
April 12, 2192 (Saros 161)

=== Inex series ===
This eclipse is a part of the long period inex cycle, repeating at alternating nodes, every 358 synodic months (≈ 10,571.95 days, or 29 years minus 20 days). Their appearance and longitude are irregular due to a lack of synchronization with the anomalistic month (period of perigee). However, groupings of 3 inex cycles (≈ 87 years minus 2 months) comes close (≈ 1,151.02 anomalistic months), so eclipses are similar in these groupings.

Series members between 1801 and 2200
January 10, 1815 (Saros 138)	December 21, 1843 (Saros 139)	November 30, 1872 (Saros 140)
November 11, 1901 (Saros 141)	October 21, 1930 (Saros 142)	October 2, 1959 (Saros 143)
September 11, 1988 (Saros 144)	August 21, 2017 (Saros 145)	August 2, 2046 (Saros 146)
July 13, 2075 (Saros 147)	June 22, 2104 (Saros 148)	June 3, 2133 (Saros 149)
May 14, 2162 (Saros 150)	April 23, 2191 (Saros 151)	

== See also ==
- List of solar eclipses visible from the United States
- Solar eclipse of August 7, 1869
- Solar eclipse of July 29, 1878
