= Solar eclipse of April 8, 2024 =

Total eclipse over North America

- Total eclipse
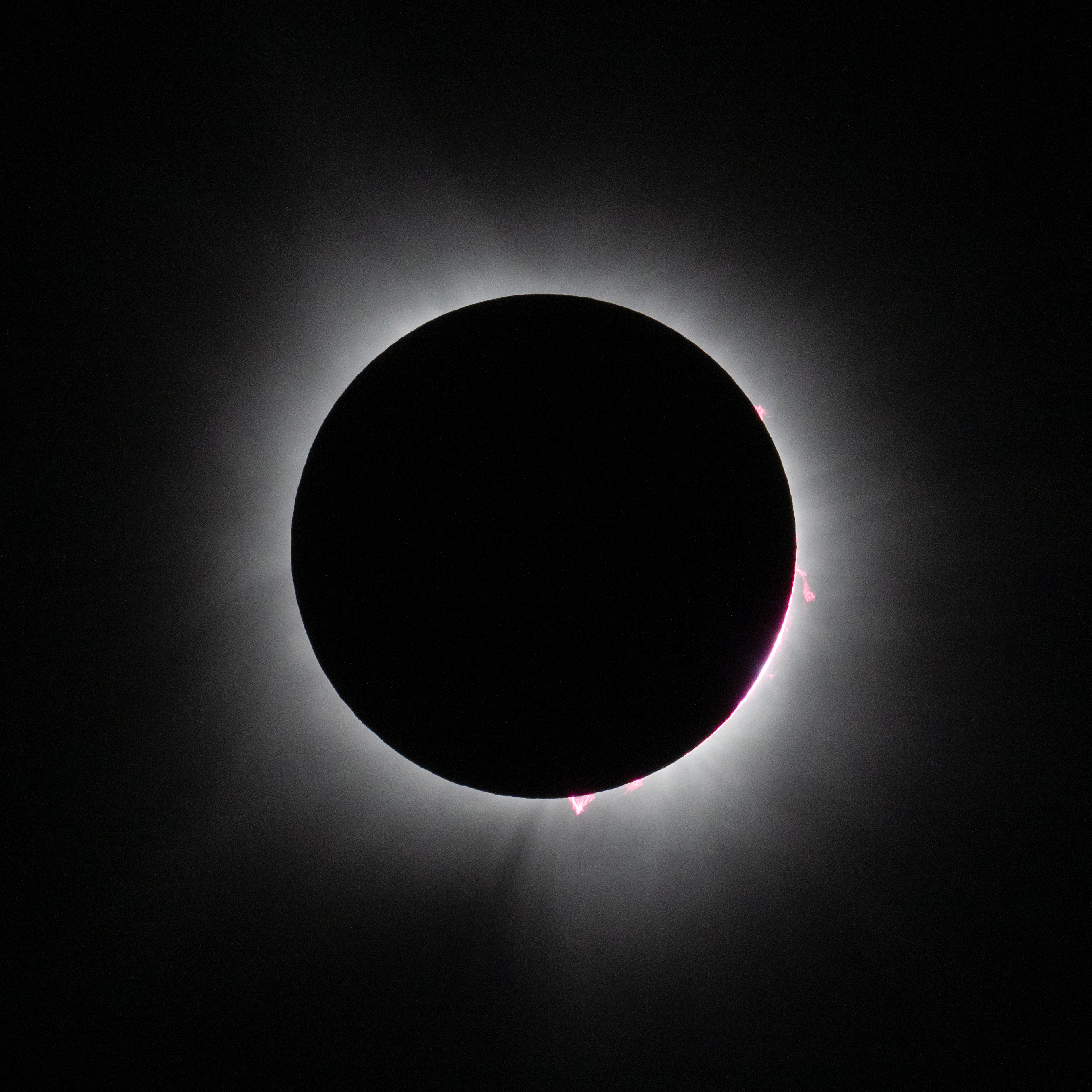
- The solar eclipse during totality, seen from Dallas, Texas

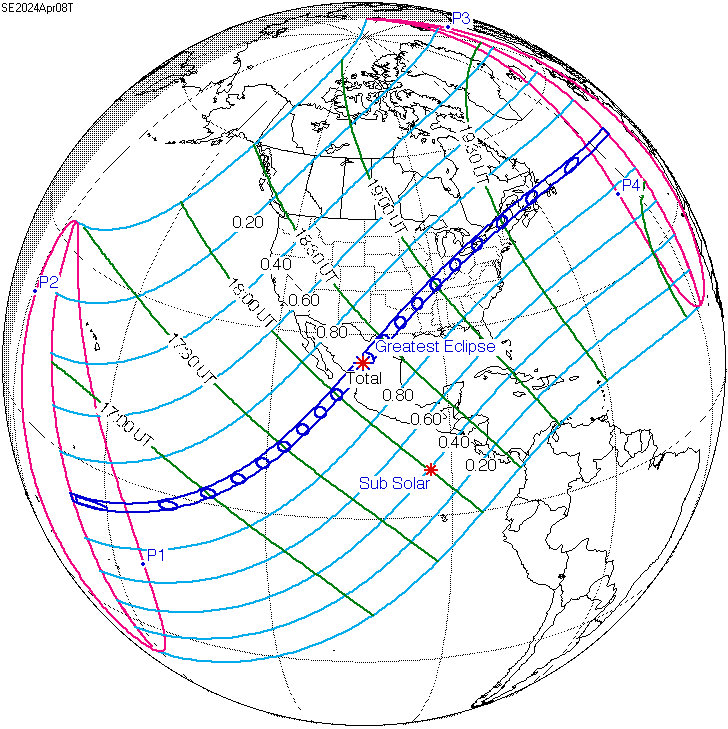
- Map
- Gamma: 0.3431
- Magnitude: 1.0566

Maximum eclipse
- Duration: 268 s (4 min 28 s)
- Location: Nazas, Durango, Mexico
- Coordinates: 25.3°N 104.1°W
- Max. width of band: 198 km (123 mi)

Times (UTC)
- (P1) Partial begin: 15:42:07
- (U1) Total begin: 16:38:44
- Greatest eclipse: 18:18:29
- (U4) Total end: 19:55:29
- (P4) Partial end: 20:52:14

References
- Saros: 139 (30 of 71)
- Catalog # (SE5000): 9561

A total solar eclipse, known as the Great North American Eclipse, occurred on April 8, 2024, and was visible across a band covering parts of North America, from Mexico to Canada and crossing the contiguous United States. A solar eclipse occurs when the Moon passes between Earth and the Sun, thereby obscuring the Sun. A total solar eclipse occurs when the Moon's apparent diameter is larger than the Sun's, which blocks all direct sunlight and allows some of the Sun's corona and solar prominences to be seen. Totality occurs only in a limited path across Earth's surface, with the partial solar eclipse visible over a larger surrounding region.

During this eclipse, the Moon's apparent diameter was 5.5 percent larger than average as a result of occurring about a day after perigee. With a magnitude of 1.0566, the eclipse's longest duration of totality was 4 minutes and 28 seconds near the Mexican town of Nazas, Durango.

This particular eclipse occurred at the Moon's ascending node of orbit. Totality was visible from 6 Mexican states, 15 U.S. states, and 6 Canadian provinces. Approximately 44 million people lived in the path of totality, including 32 million in the United States, 6 million in Canada, and 6 million in Mexico. The 10 largest cities in the path of totality accounted for a third of this population (5 of the 10 largest cities being in the United States, 3 in Mexico, and 2 in Canada). Adding people who travelled to the path of totality, an estimated 50 million people experienced the total solar eclipse, with at least 20 million people travelling to areas within the path of totality in the US alone. Meanwhile, about 652 million people experienced a partial solar eclipse.

This eclipse was the first total solar eclipse visible from Canada since August 1, 2008, and from the provinces since February 26, 1979. It was the first over Mexico since July 11, 1991. It was also the first over the United States since August 21, 2017. This is the only solar eclipse in the 21st century with totality visible from all three countries. The next total solar eclipse in the US will be on March 30, 2033, which will pass over Alaska. The next total eclipse in the contiguous United States will be on August 22, 2044. The next total eclipse of similar width will take place on August 12, 2045, which will traverse coast-to-coast in a trajectory similar to the 2017 eclipse.

== Observations ==
Animation of the eclipse path (including the path of totality)

The totality of the solar eclipse was visible in a strip beginning in the Pacific Ocean, the edge of which passed approximately 60 kilometers north of Penrhyn atoll, 115 kilometers south of Starbuck Island, 275 kilometers north of Vostok Island, and 370 kilometers north of the Marquesas Islands. Later, the total solar eclipse was visible from North America, starting from the west coast of Mexico then ascending in a northeasterly direction through Mexico, the United States, and Canada, before ending in the Atlantic Ocean about 700 kilometers southwest of Ireland.

=== Visibility in the Americas ===
==== Mexico ====
Ten-minute time lapse video of the total solar eclipse on April 8, 2024, in Mazatlán, Sinaloa.

Totality first passed over the Revillagigedo Islands (a federal possession of Mexico and associated with Colima state) and Islas Marías of Nayarit. Upon reaching the continental mainland, totality passed through the states of Sinaloa (including Mazatlán), northern Nayarit, Durango (including the city of Durango and Gómez Palacio), extreme southeast Chihuahua, and Coahuila (including Torreón, Matamoros, Monclova, Sabinas, Ciudad Acuña, and Piedras Negras). A partial eclipse was visible across the remainder of the country, including 79% coverage of the solar disc in Mexico City. Torreón was the most populous Mexican city in the path of totality.

==== United States ====
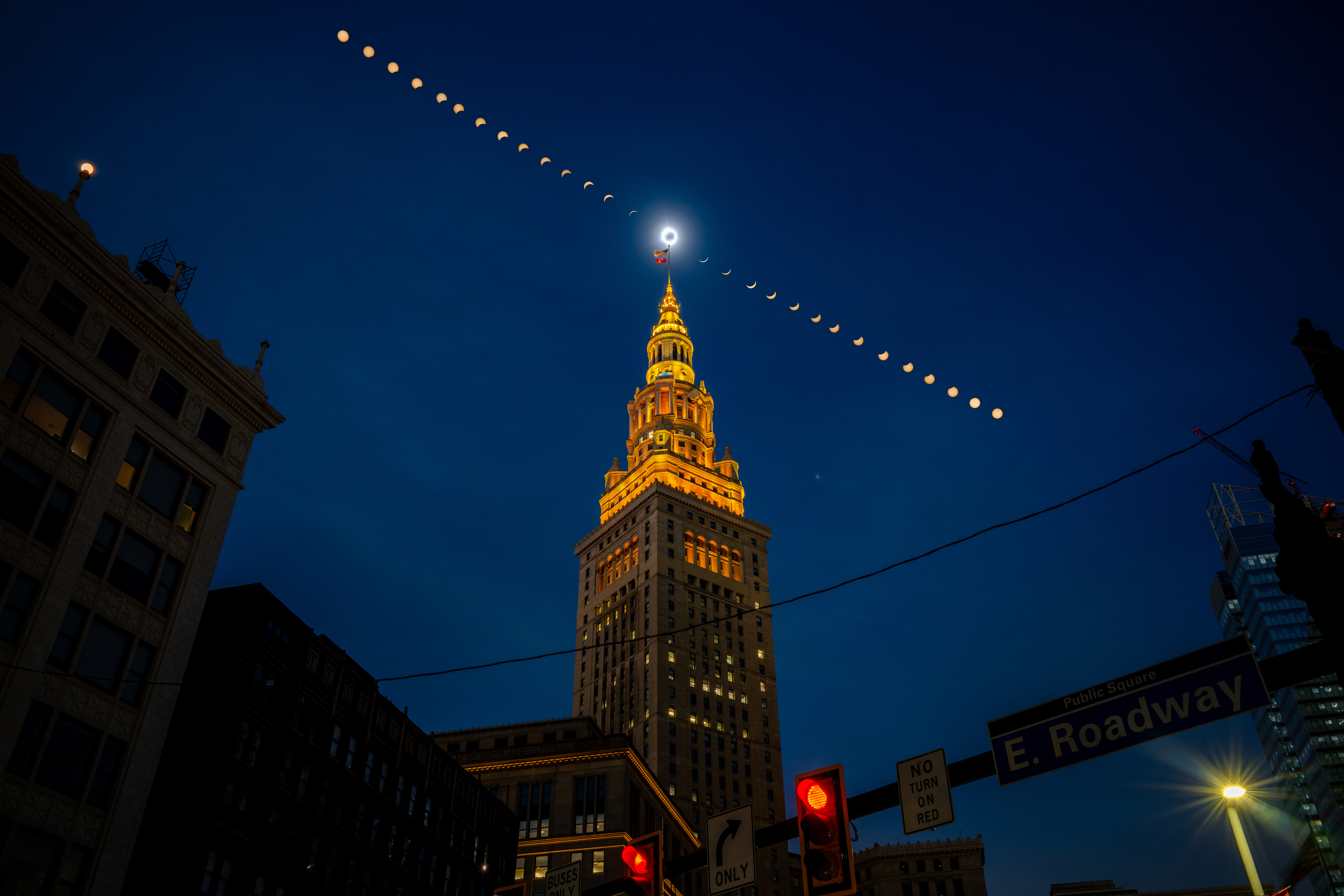
Solar eclipse progression as seen over the Terminal Tower in Cleveland, Ohio

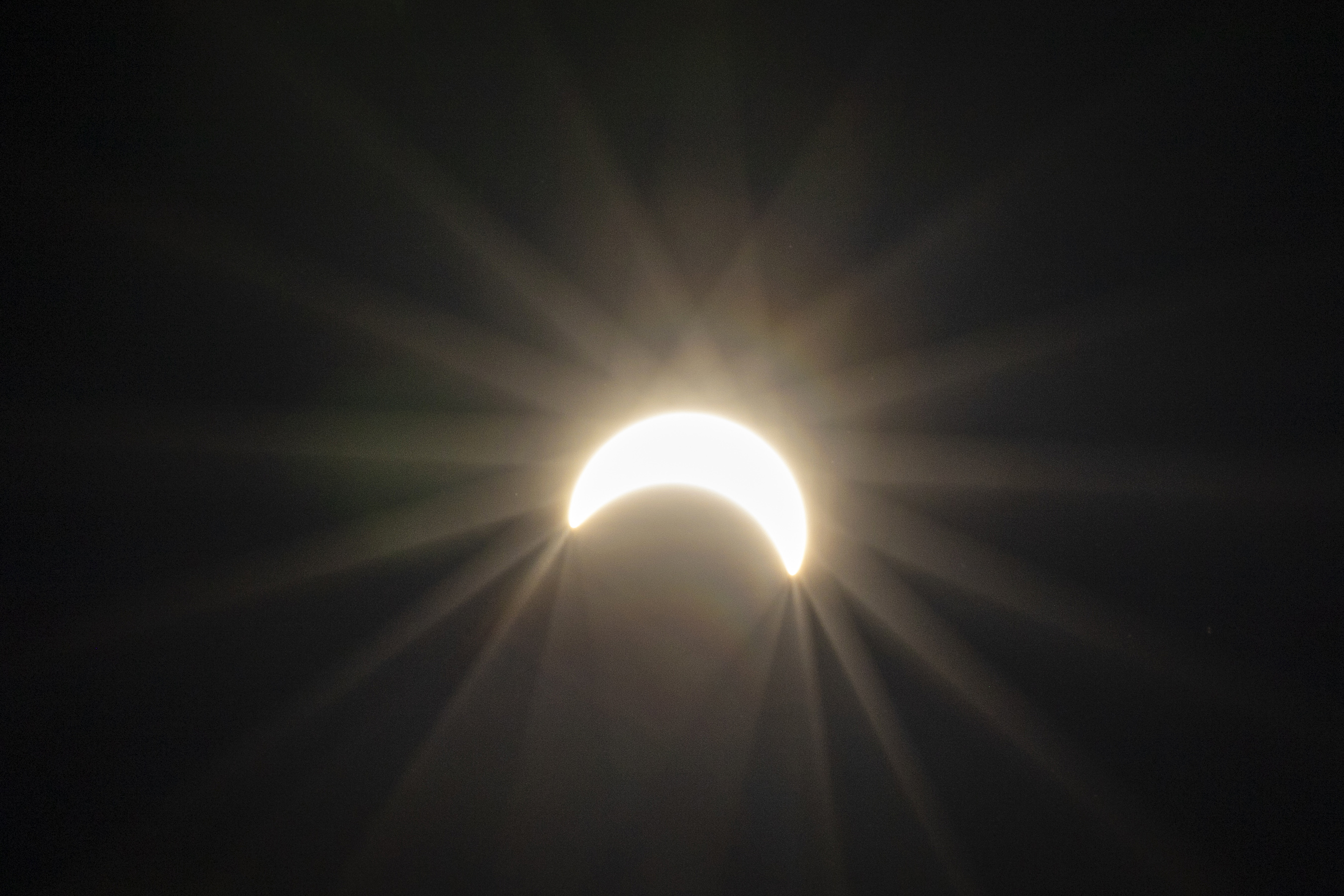
Solar eclipse seen from the roof of the Joint Force Headquarters building in Lincoln, Nebraska, April 8, 2024.

In the United States, totality was visible through the states of Texas (including parts of San Antonio, Austin, Fort Worth, and all of Arlington, Dallas, Killeen, Temple, Texarkana, Tyler, Sulphur Springs, and Waco); Oklahoma (including Idabel and Broken Bow); Arkansas (including Morrilton/Petit Jean, Hot Springs, Searcy, Jonesboro, and Little Rock); Missouri (including Cape Girardeau and Poplar Bluff); Tennessee (extreme northwestern corner of Lake County); Illinois (including Carbondale, where it intersected the path of the 2017 eclipse); Kentucky; Indiana (including Bloomington, Evansville, Indianapolis, Anderson, Muncie, Terre Haute, and Vincennes); Ohio (including Akron, Cleveland, Dayton, Lima, Lorain,Toledo, and Warren); Michigan (extreme southeastern corner of Monroe County); Pennsylvania (including Erie); Upstate New York (including Buffalo, Niagara Falls, Rochester, Syracuse, Watertown, the Adirondacks, Potsdam, and Plattsburgh); northern Vermont (including Burlington); New Hampshire; and Maine; with the line of totality going almost directly over the state's highest point Mount Katahdin. The largest city that was entirely in the path was Dallas, Texas. It was the second total eclipse visible from the central United States in just seven years, after the eclipse of August 21, 2017. It was the last total solar eclipse visible in the contiguous United States until August 23, 2044.

A partial solar eclipse was visible in all of the other parts of the contiguous United States, Hawaii, and southeast Alaska (Alaska Panhandle).

Delta Air Lines scheduled two special eclipse-following flights: one from Austin to Detroit on a large-window A220-300, and one from Dallas to Detroit. Various other flights in the path of totality also avoided cloud cover entirely.

==== Canada ====
Video of total eclipse in Saint-Georges, Quebec, on April 8, 2024

In Canada, totality was visible through parts of Southern Ontario (including Leamington, Fort Erie, Hamilton, Niagara Falls, Kingston, Prince Edward County, and Cornwall), parts of southern Quebec (including Montreal, Sherbrooke, Saint-Georges, and Lac-Mégantic), central New Brunswick (including Fredericton, Woodstock and Miramichi), western Prince Edward Island (including Tignish and Summerside), the northern tip of Cape Breton Island, Nova Scotia, and central Newfoundland (including Gander and Grand Falls-Windsor). Then, it ended on the eastern Atlantic coast of Newfoundland. The most populous Canadian city that the path of totality intersected was Montreal. Windsor, London, Toronto, and Ottawa lay just north of the path of totality, and Moncton just south of it.

A partial solar eclipse was visible in all of the other parts of Canada, except the western part of Yukon and the western tip of the Northwest Territories.

Boat cruises to observe the eclipse were conducted on Lake Erie, Niagara River, Lake Ontario, and Saint Lawrence River.

==== Central America and South America ====
The partial eclipse was seen in all Central American countries, from Belize to Panama, all the Greater Antilles (Cuba, Dominican Republic, Haiti, Puerto Rico, and Jamaica), and northern South America (Colombia).

==== Largest cities and recommended viewing sites ====
Space.com identified the ten largest cities where totality was visible. In population order, they were:

1. Montreal, Quebec
2. San Antonio, Texas
3. Dallas, Texas
4. Austin, Texas
5. Fort Worth, Texas
6. Indianapolis, Indiana
7. Durango, Durango
8. Hamilton, Ontario
9. Torreón, Coahuila
10. Mazatlán, Sinaloa

Astronomy magazine provided a list of 20 recommended viewing sites, based on factors such as proximity to the center line, population size, ease of access, and so on. They were ordered from west to east:

- Mazatlán, Sinaloa
- Nazas, Durango
- Piedras Negras, Coahuila
- Radar Base, Texas
- Kerrville, Texas
- Lampasas, Texas
- Hillsboro, Texas
- Sulphur Springs, Texas
- Russellville, Arkansas
- Cape Girardeau, Missouri
- Vincennes, Indiana
- Indianapolis, Indiana
- Lima, Ohio
- Cleveland, Ohio
- Erie, Pennsylvania
- Niagara Falls, New York
- Buffalo, New York
- Plattsburgh, New York
- Sherbrooke, Quebec
- Mars Hill, Maine

=== Visibility in other continents ===
==== Europe ====
A partial eclipse passed over Svalbard (Norway), Iceland, Ireland, western parts of the United Kingdom, north-western parts of Spain and Portugal, the Azores, and the Canary Islands. Cloud cover prevented views of it from most of the British Isles, although it was seen in Western Scotland. Unusually, this eclipse extended below the horizon, where the greatest phase was observed at mid-nautical twilight in Galicia (Spain) and the beginning of astronomical twilight in Nouvelle-Aquitaine (France). The extension of the eclipse path within the twilight zone created what was likely the best observation window for the 12P/Pons–Brooks comet located closely to Jupiter.

==== Oceania ====
The partial eclipse was seen in Hawaii, eastern Kiribati (the eastern Phoenix Islands and the whole Line Islands), Tokelau, American Samoa except for its extreme western part, the Cook Islands, French Polynesia, and the Pitcairn Islands. Although all located east of the 180th meridian, the local time of the eclipse in Kiribati and Tokelau was Tuesday, April 9, 2024, because either UTC+13 or UTC+14 is observed in these areas.

=== Eclipse path intersections ===
The path of the April 8, 2024, eclipse crossed the path of the previous American total solar eclipse of August 21, 2017, with the intersection of the two paths being in southern Illinois, in Makanda, just south of Carbondale. The path of the April 8 eclipse also crossed the path of the annular solar eclipse that occurred less than 6 months prior, on October 14, 2023, intersecting in the vicinity of San Antonio, Texas. The intersection of two total solar eclipses over the exact same spot within a 7-year period was found to be unusual, since the average interval for any given spot on Earth to observe a total solar eclipse is about once every 375 years. A similar total eclipse intersection occurred in Turkey during the August 1999 and March 2006 solar eclipses. A similar intersection of total solar eclipses will also occur over Egypt in August 2027 and March 2034. The intersection patterns are caused by the dynamics of the Saros cycle.

=== Gallery ===
==== Total ====
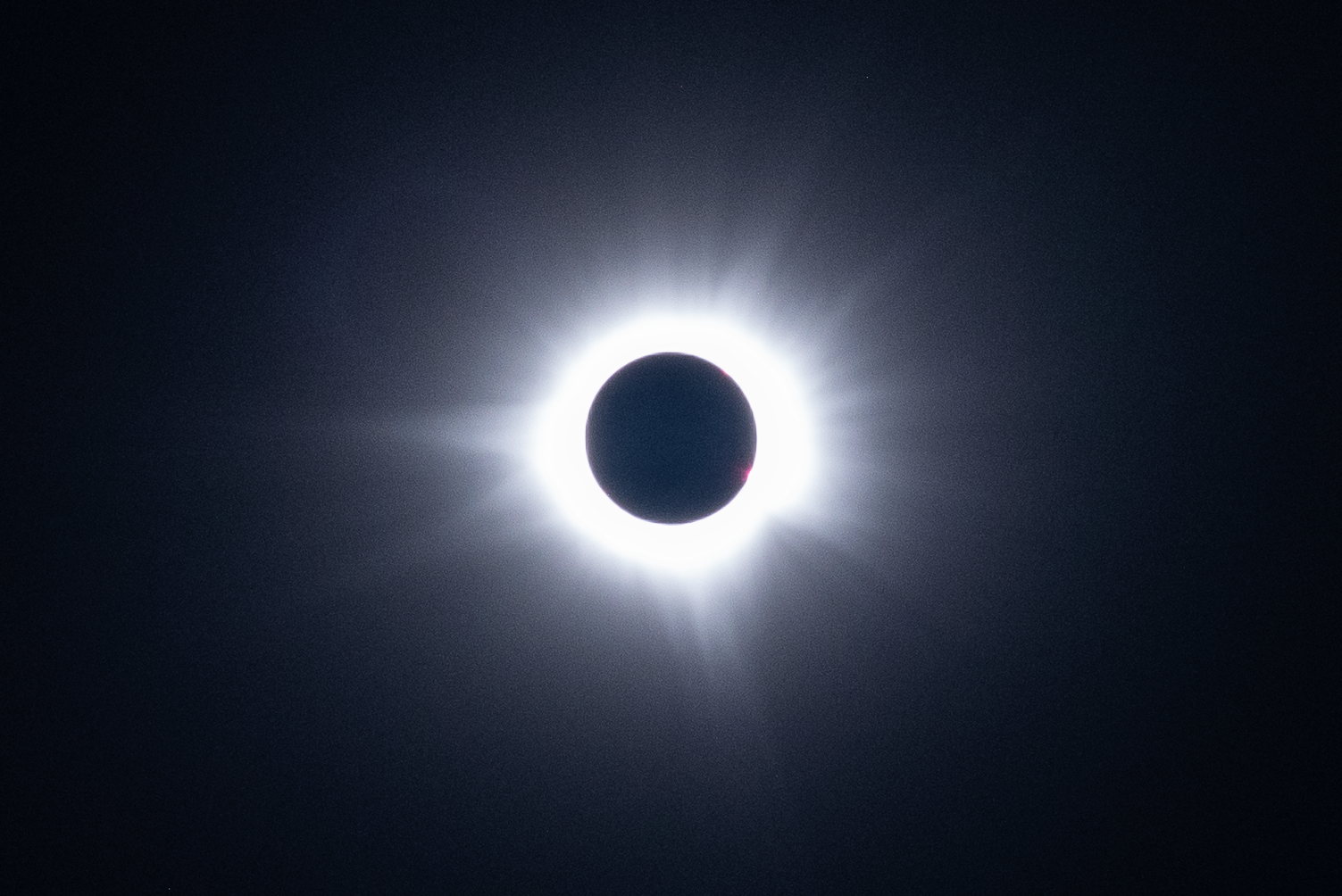
Totality on board the MS Zaandam

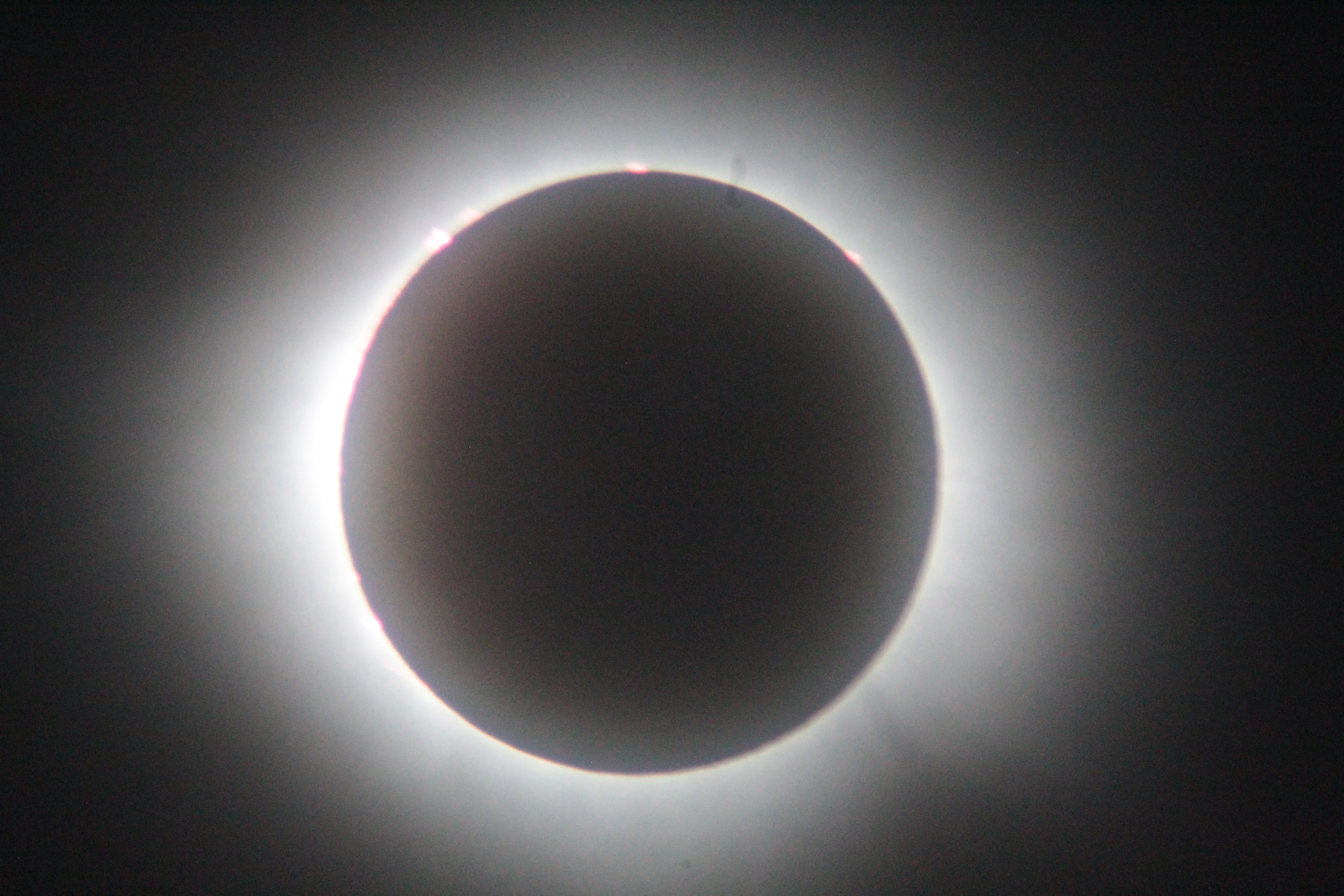
Totality as seen from Mazatlán, Sinaloa

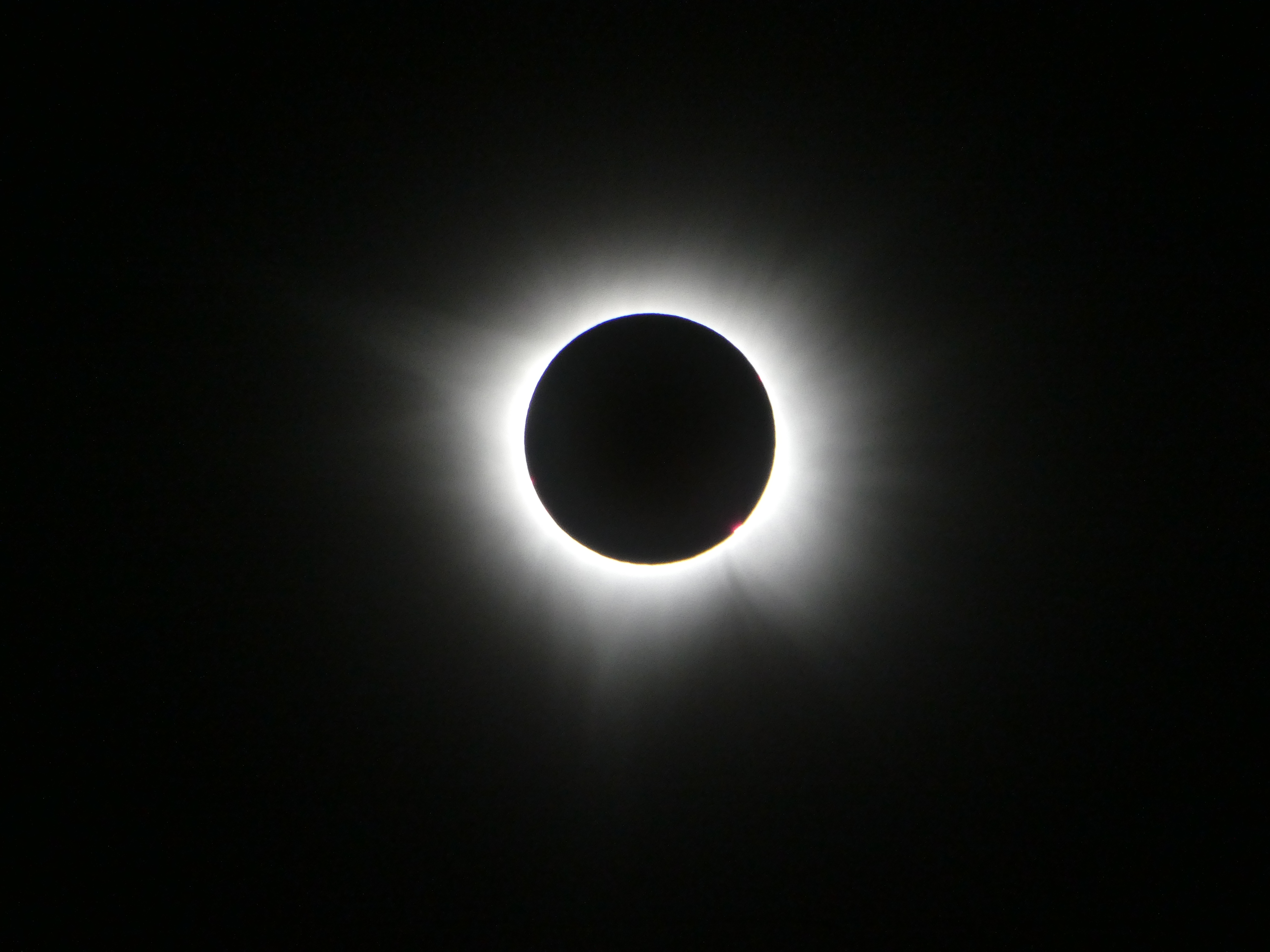
Totality as seen from Victoria de Durango, Durango

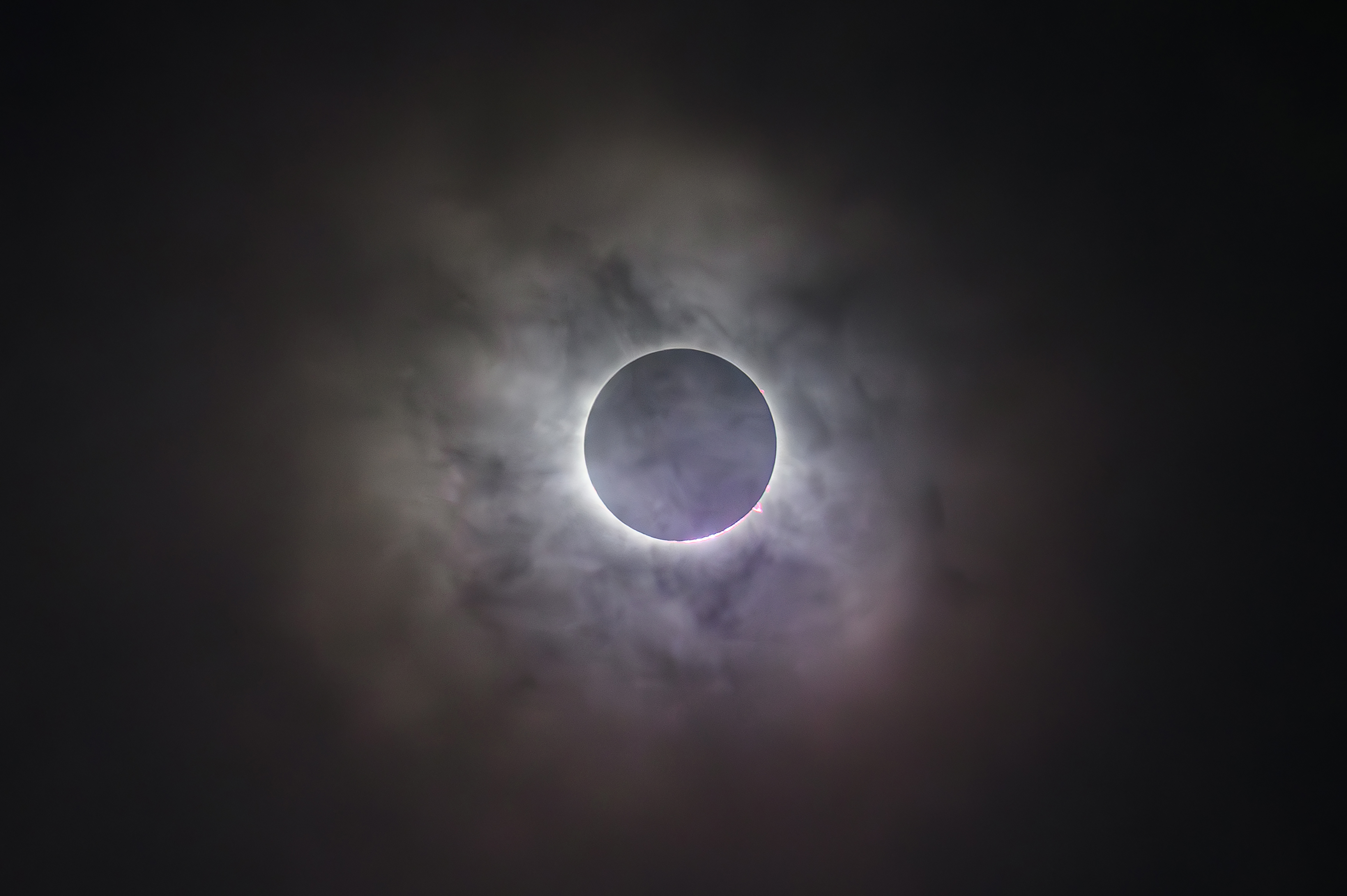
Totality as seen from Viesca, Coahuila

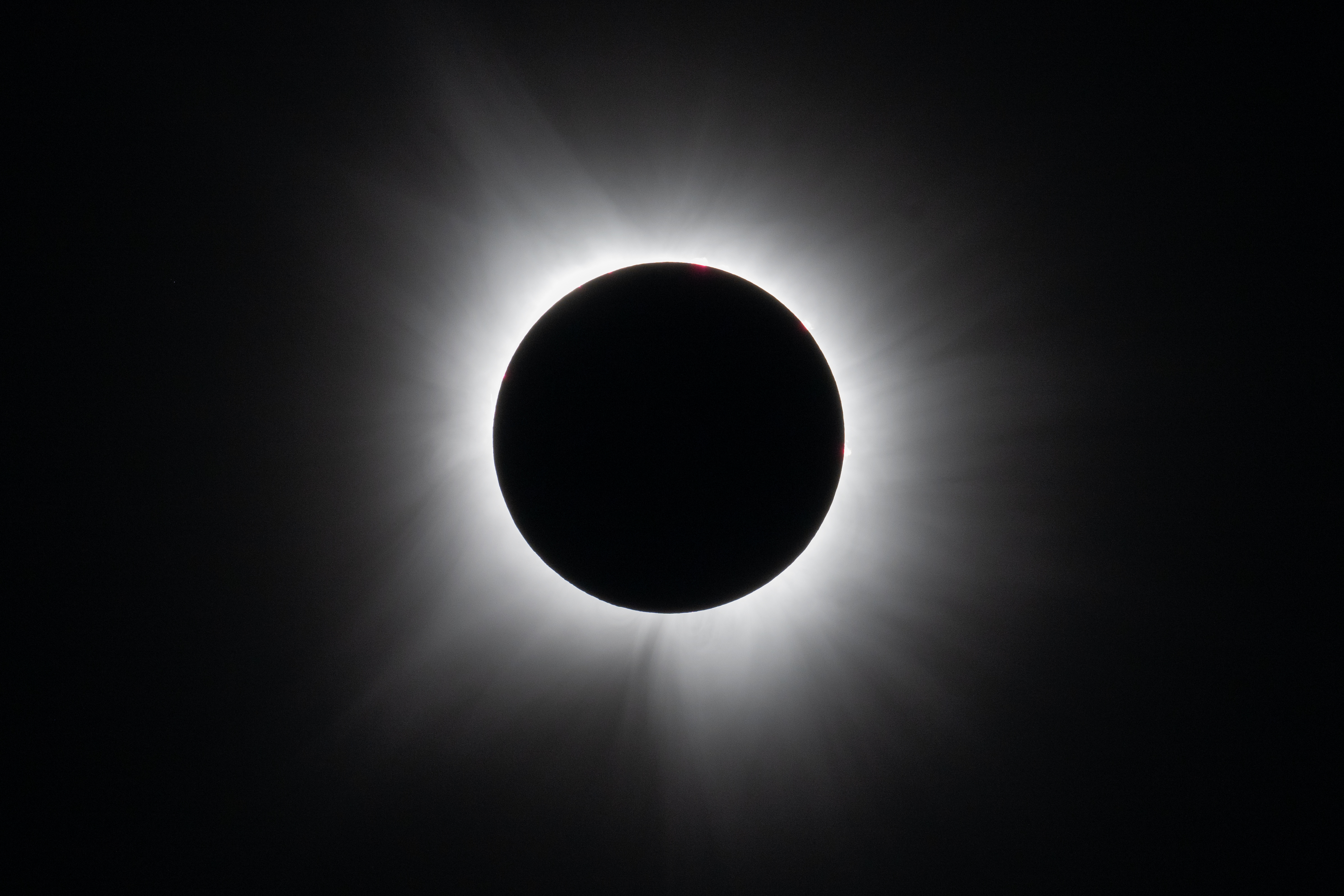
Totality as seen from Dallas, Texas

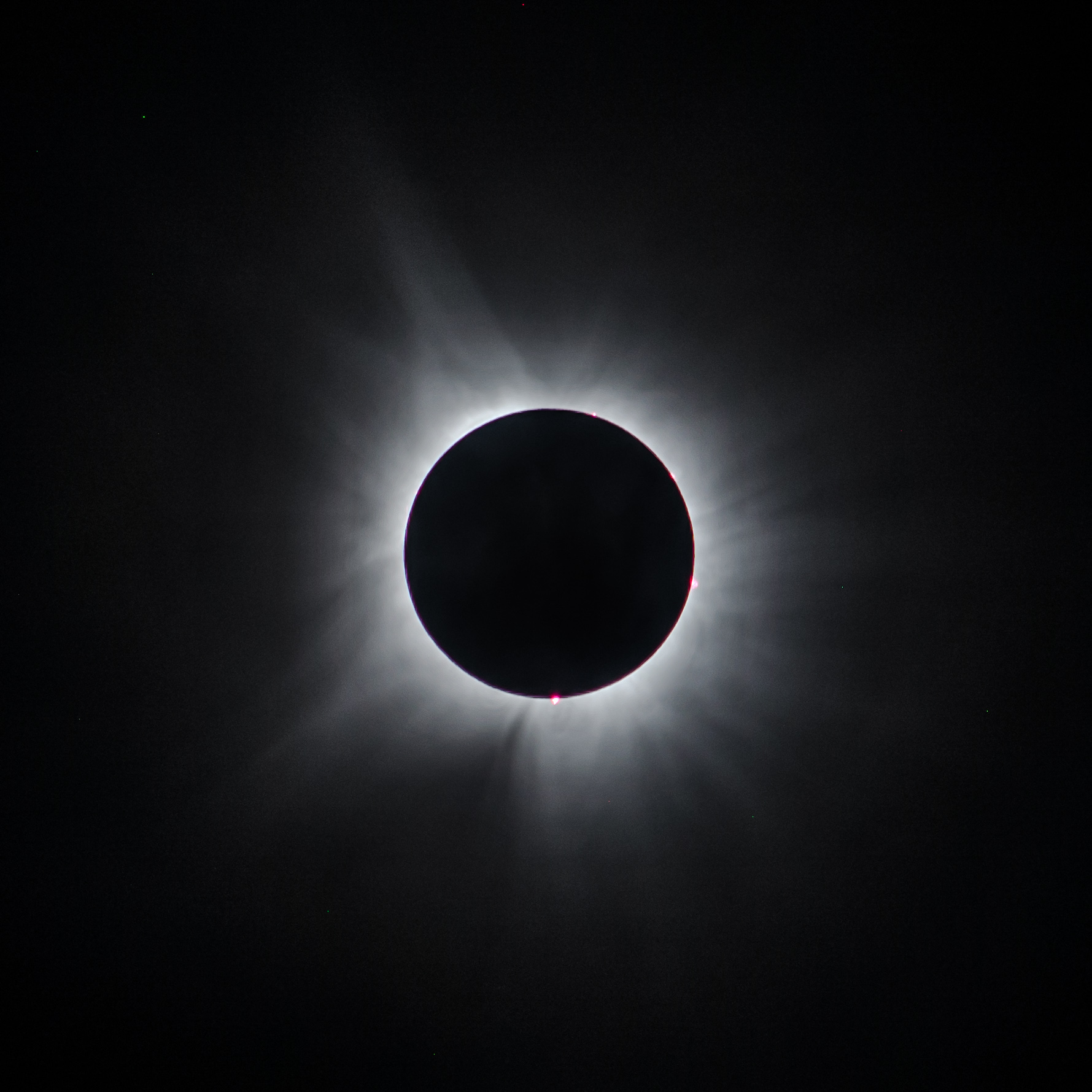
Totality as seen from Russellville, Arkansas

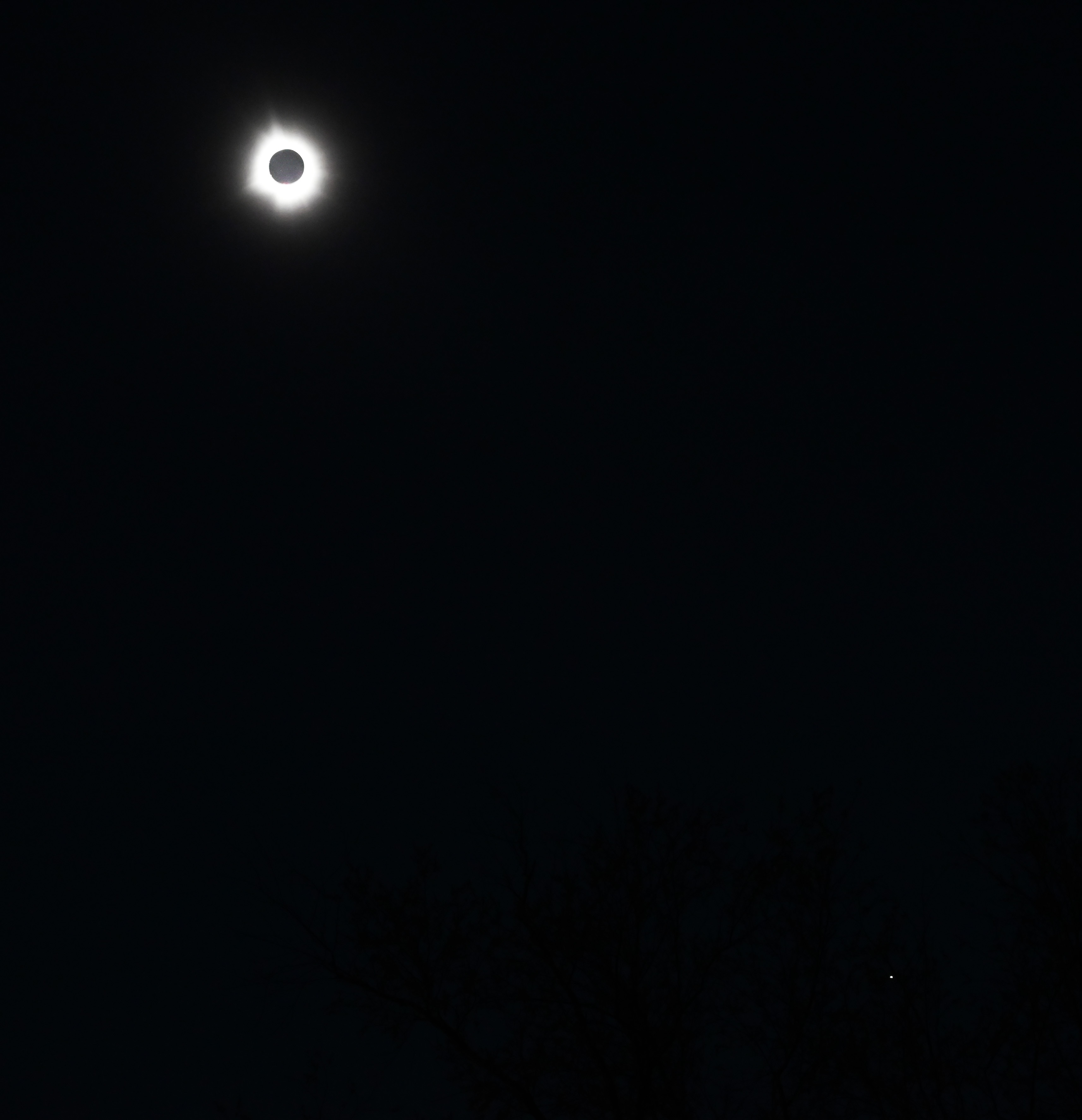
Totality with Venus near the lower right corner, as seen from Vienna, Illinois

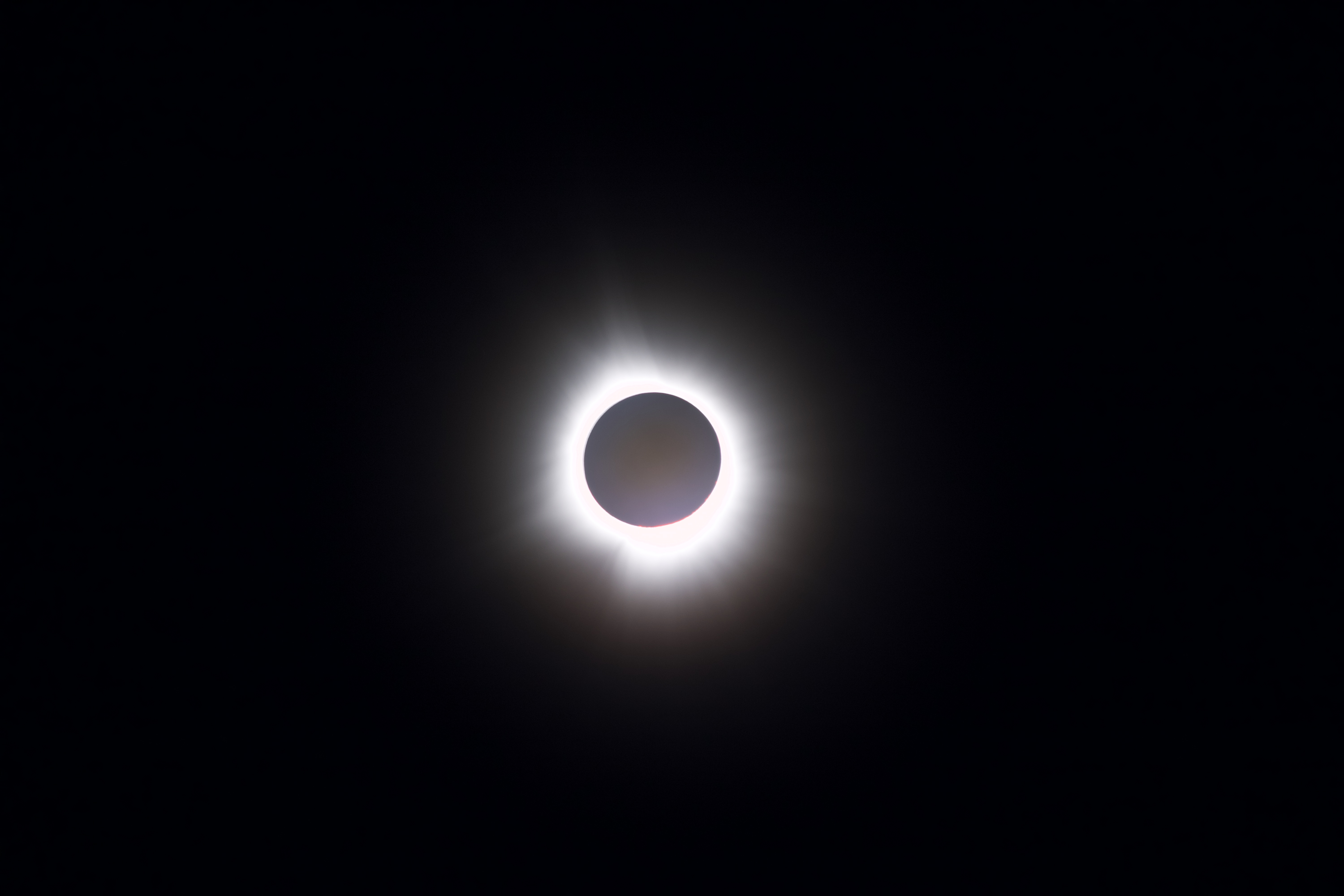
Totality as seen from Crab Orchard National Wildlife Refuge, Illinois

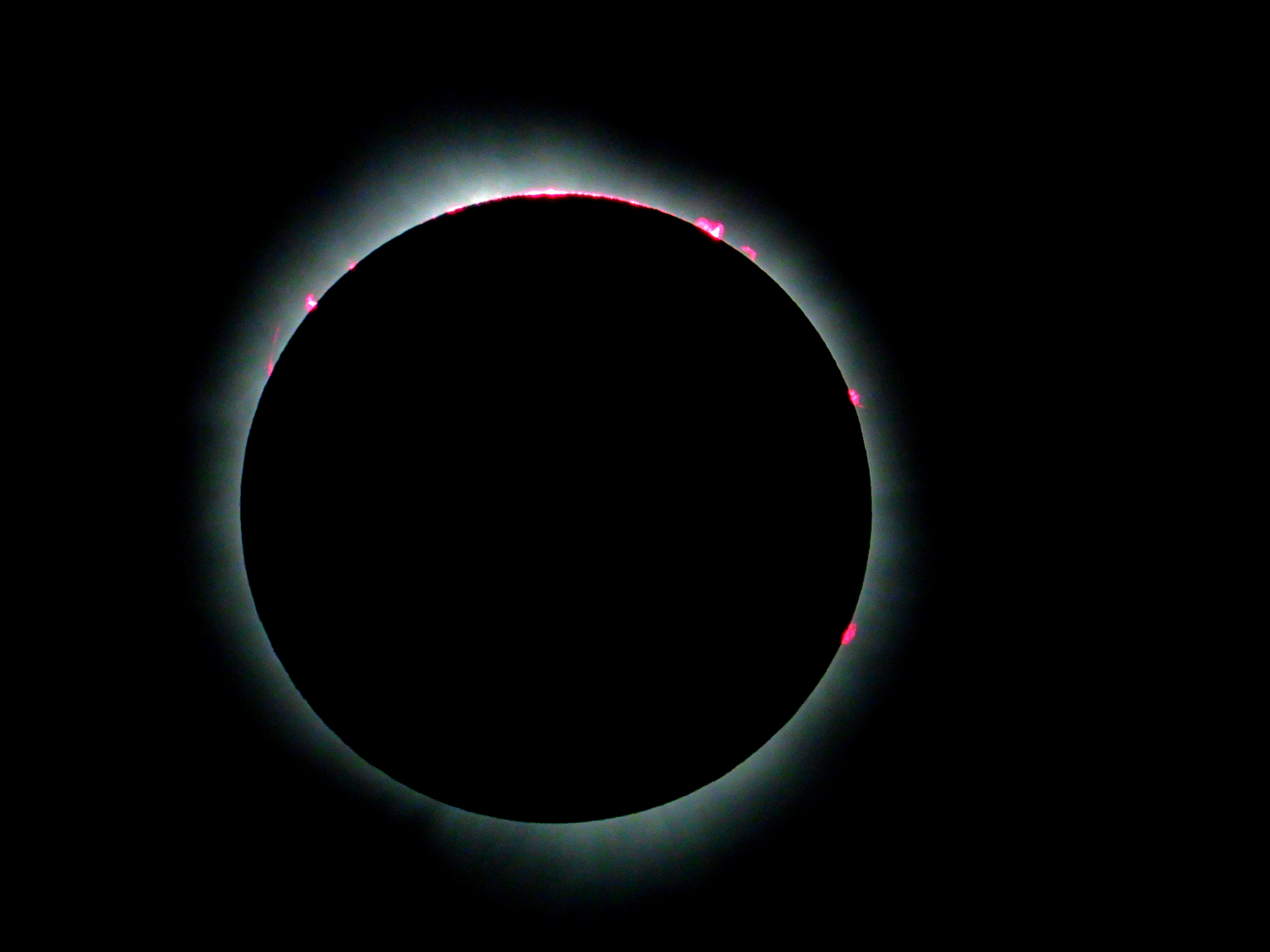
Totality as seen from Speedway, Indiana

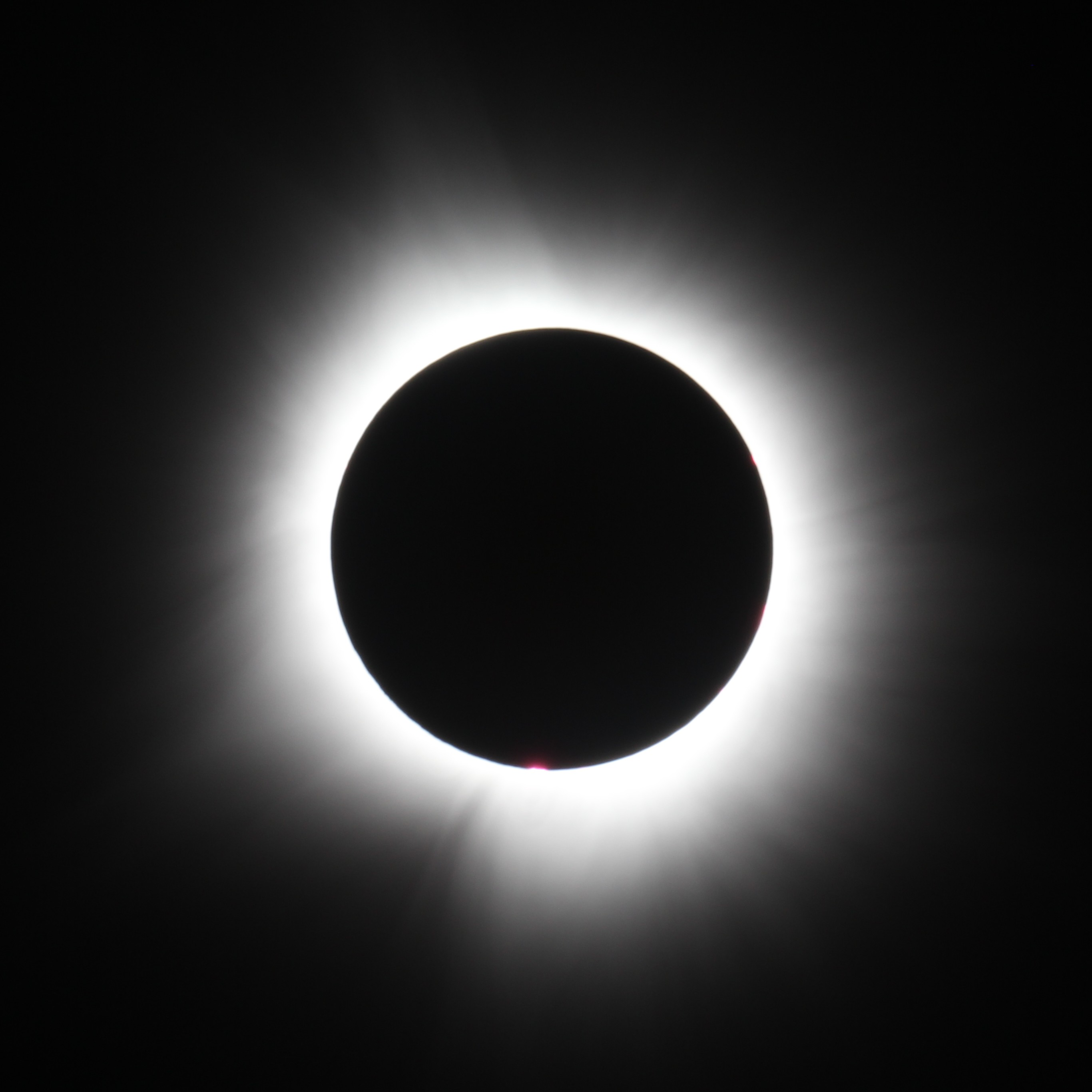
Totality as seen from Indianapolis, Indiana

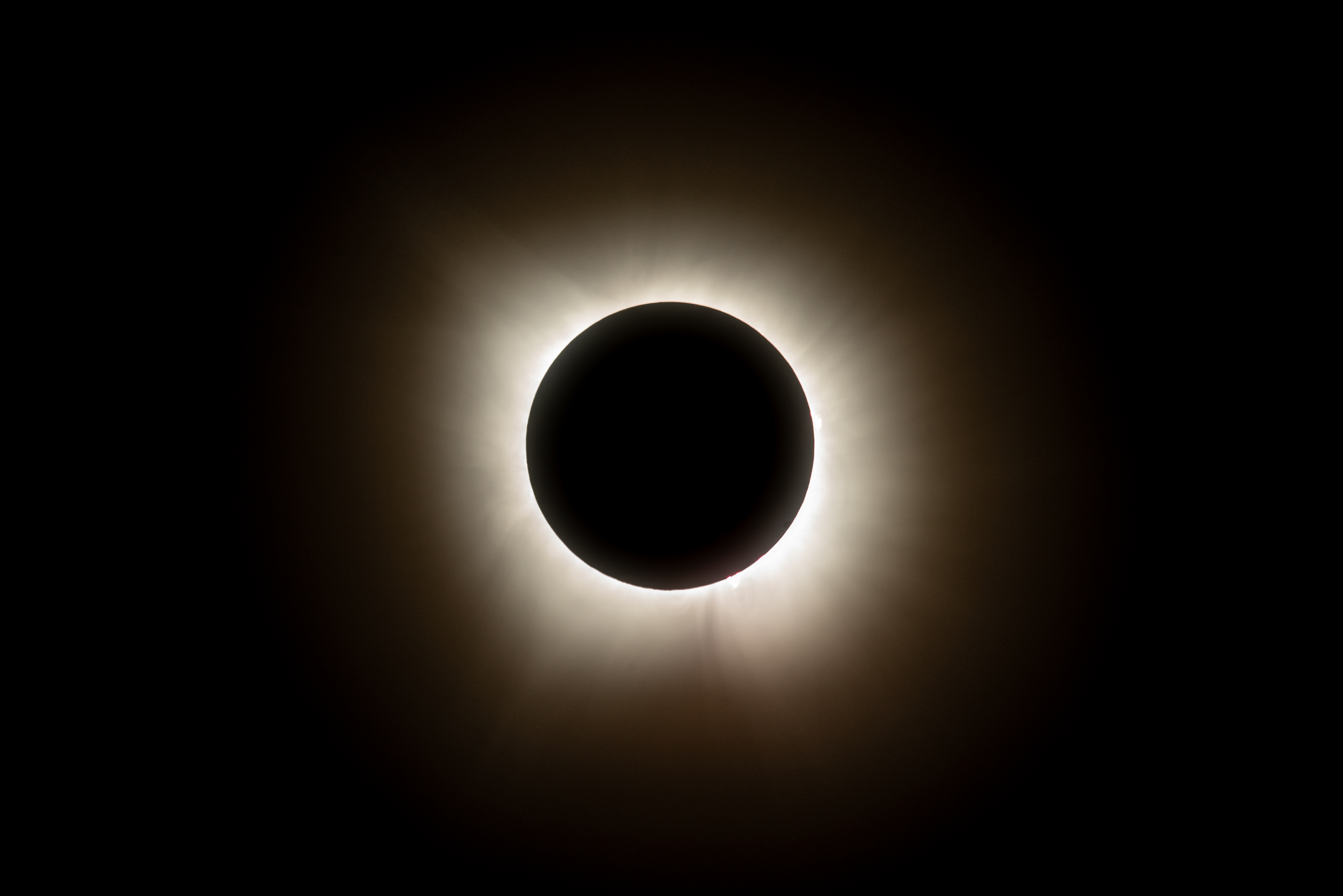
Totality as seen from Cleveland, Ohio

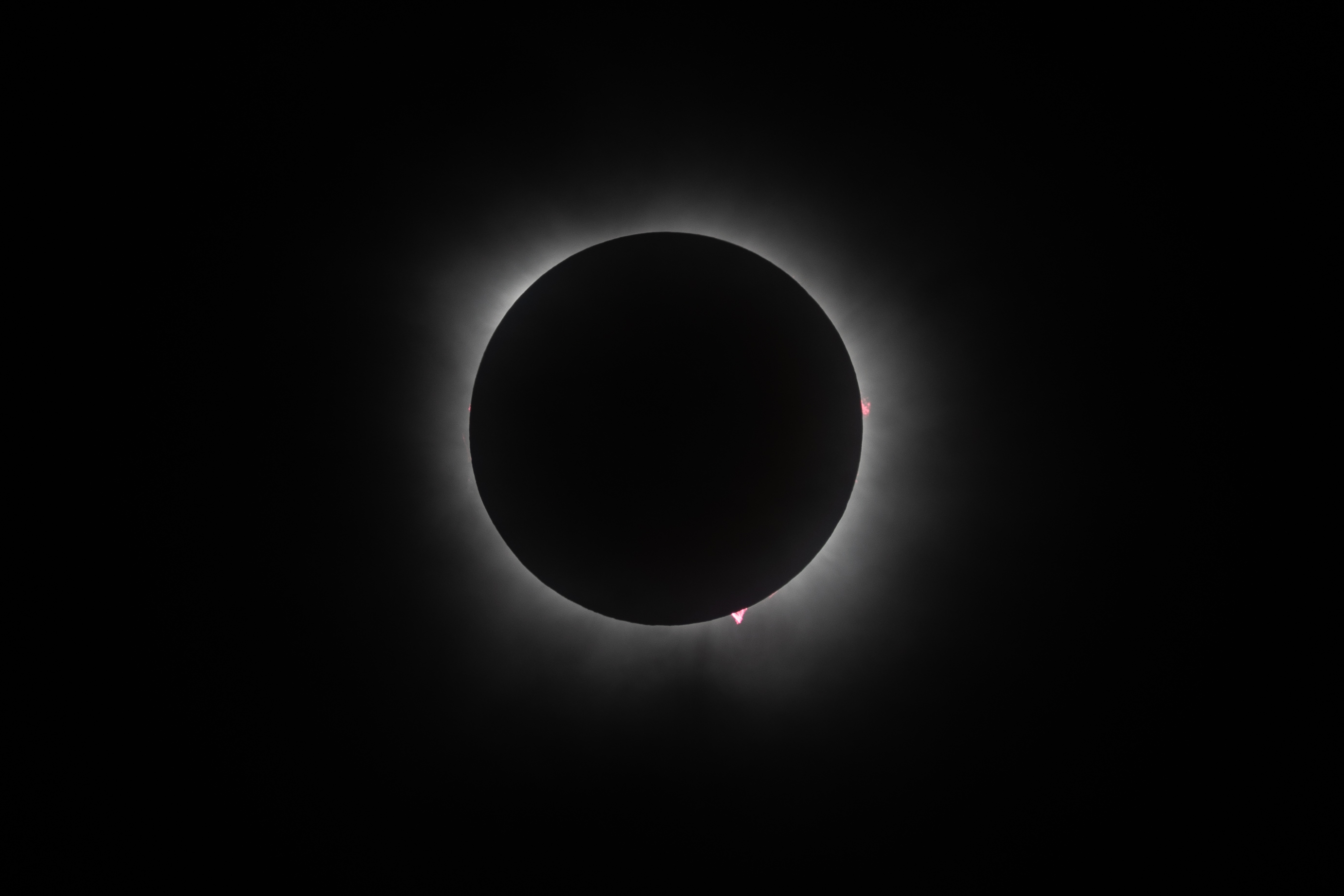
Totality as seen from Harborcreek, Pennsylvania

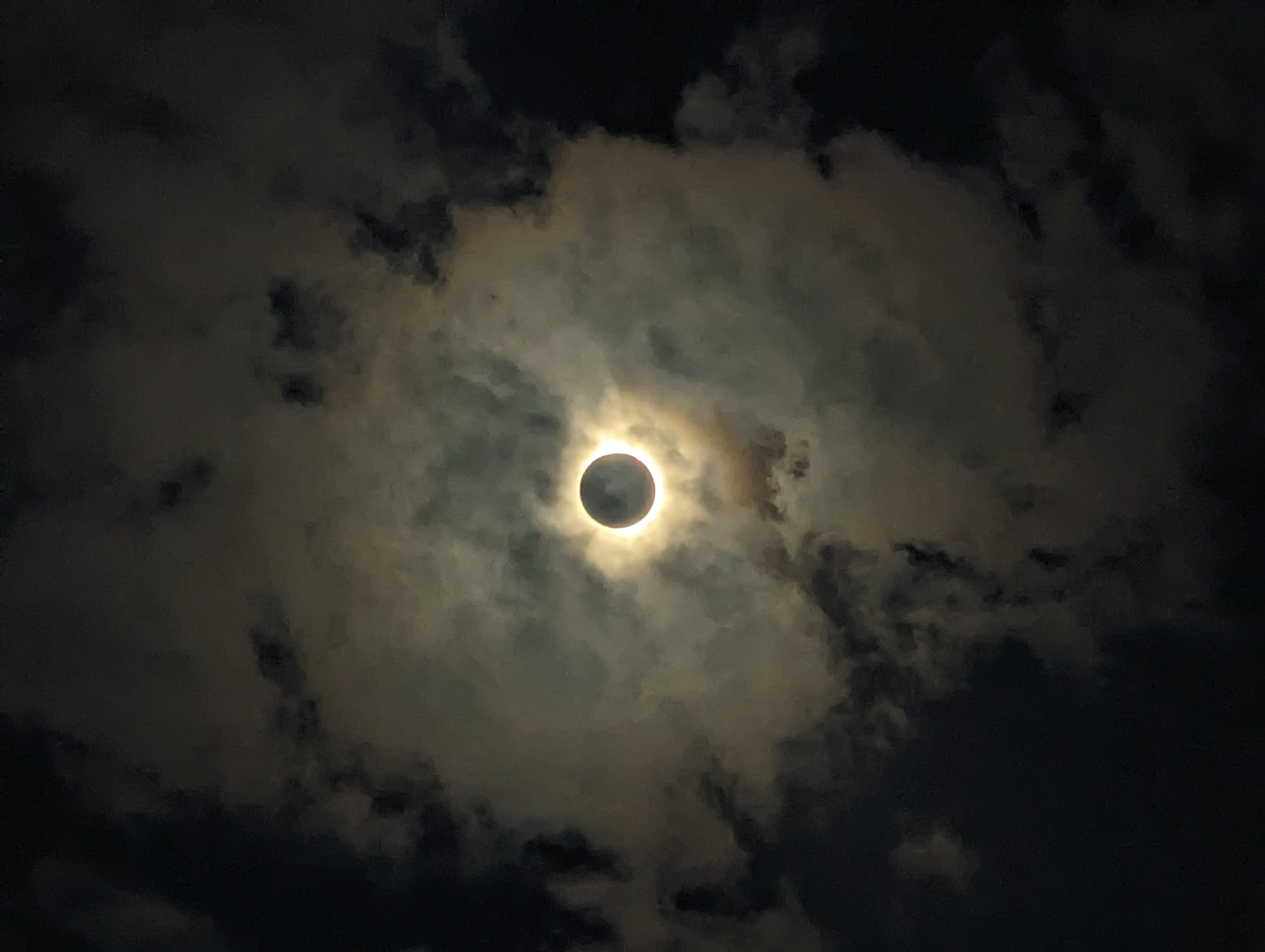
Totality as seen from James N. Allan Provincial Park, Ontario

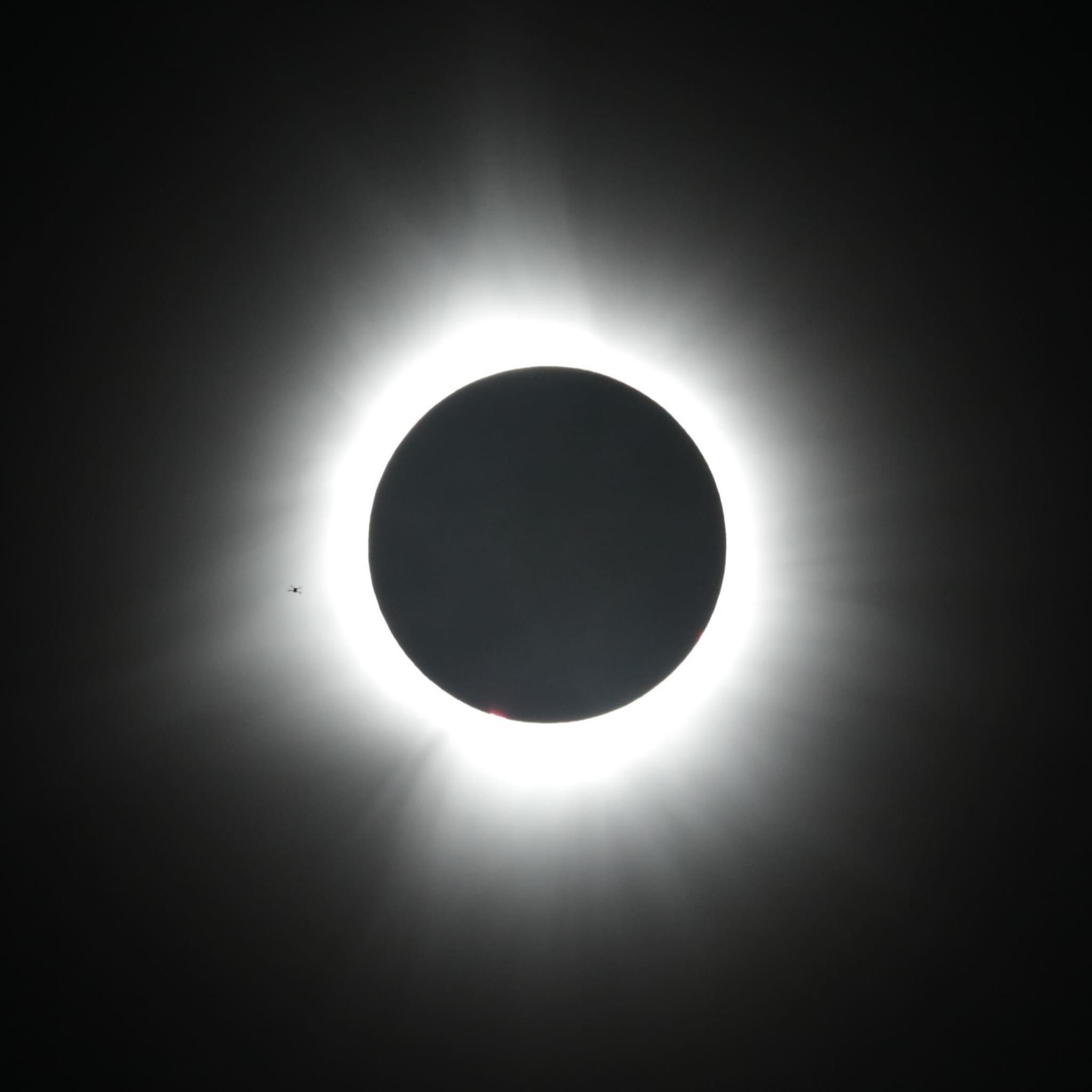
Quadcopter transits during totality from Newport, Vermont

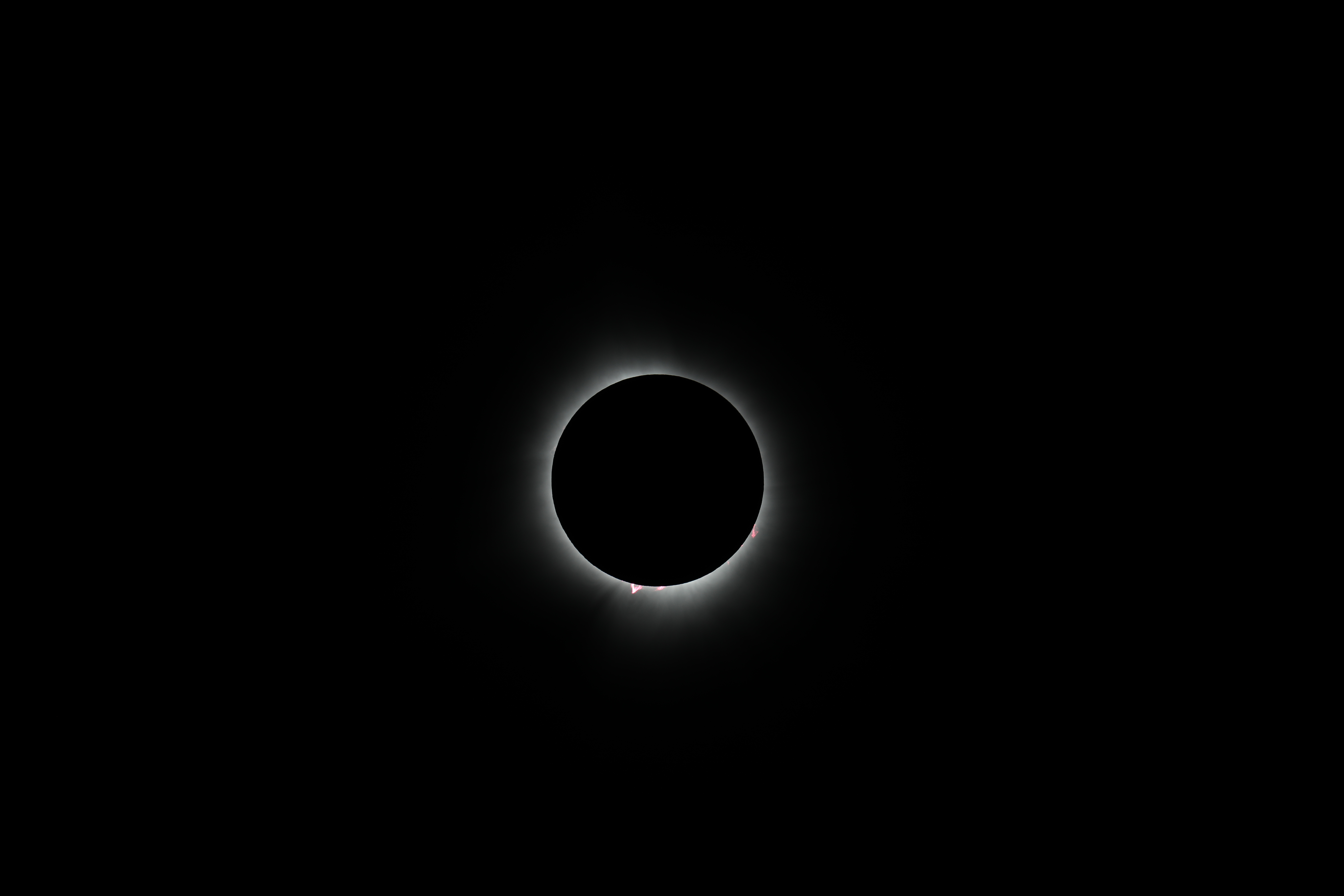
Totality as seen from Greenville, Maine

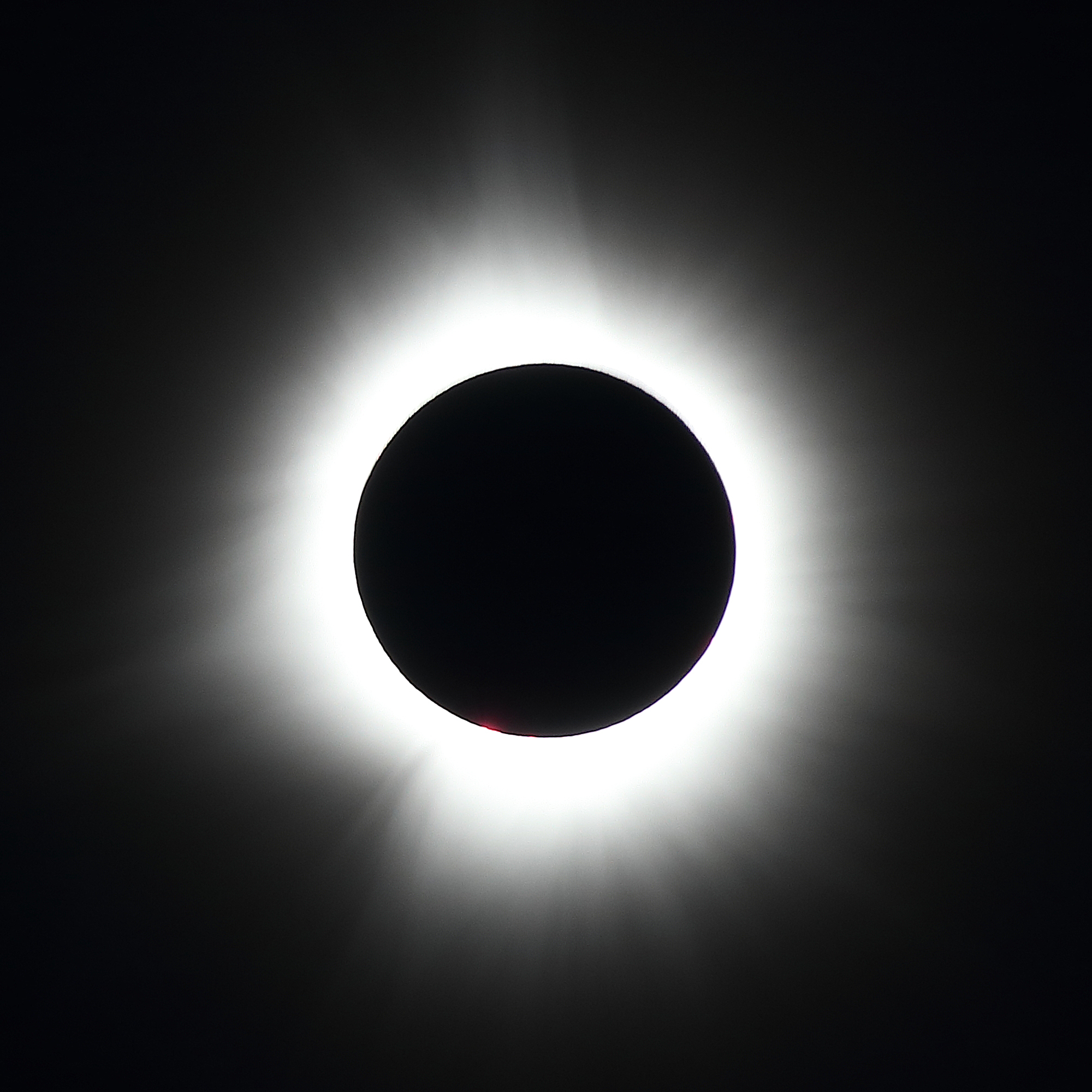
Totality as seen from Jackman, Maine

==== Total with scenery ====
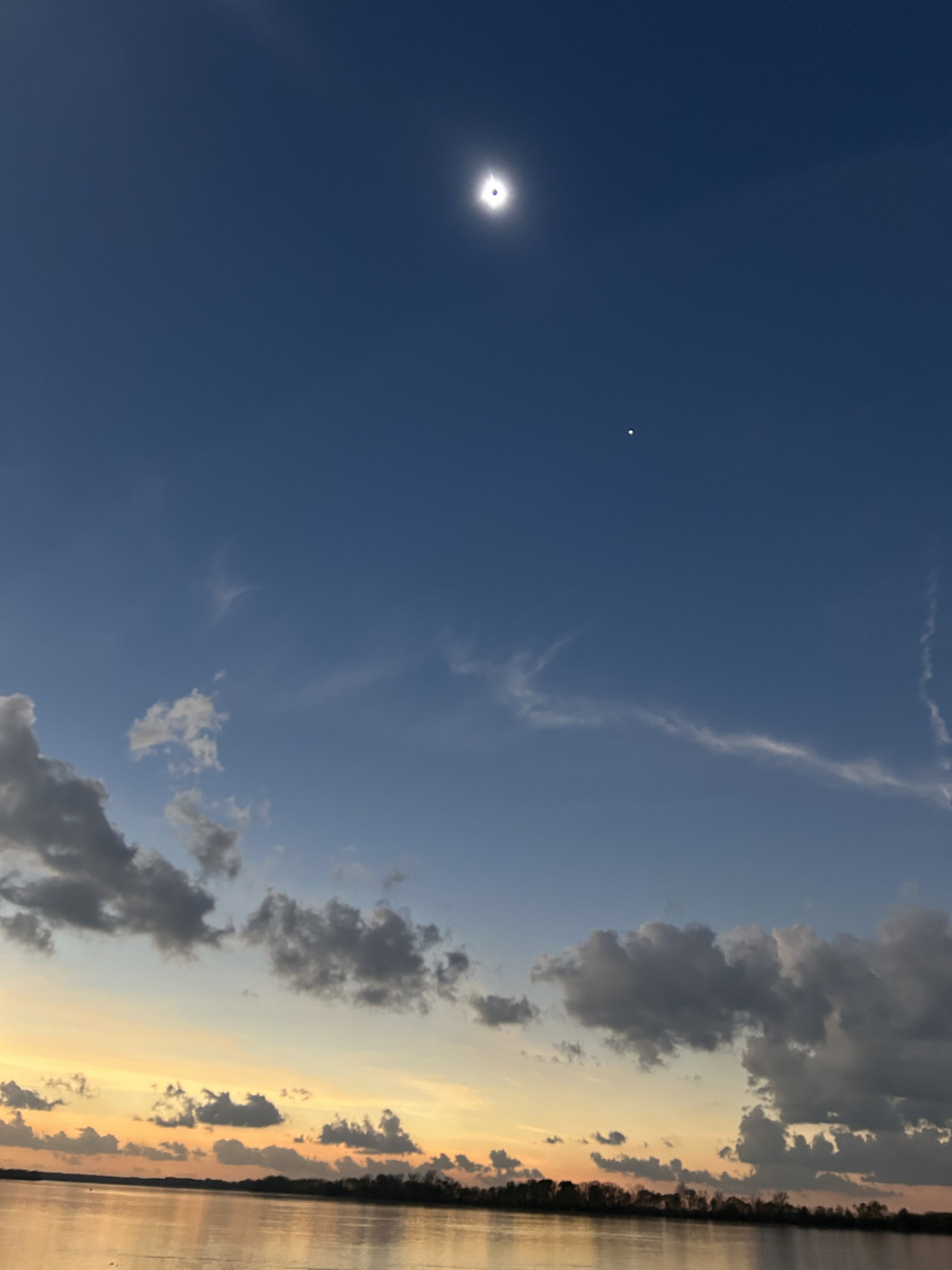
Totality with Venus over Evansville, Indiana

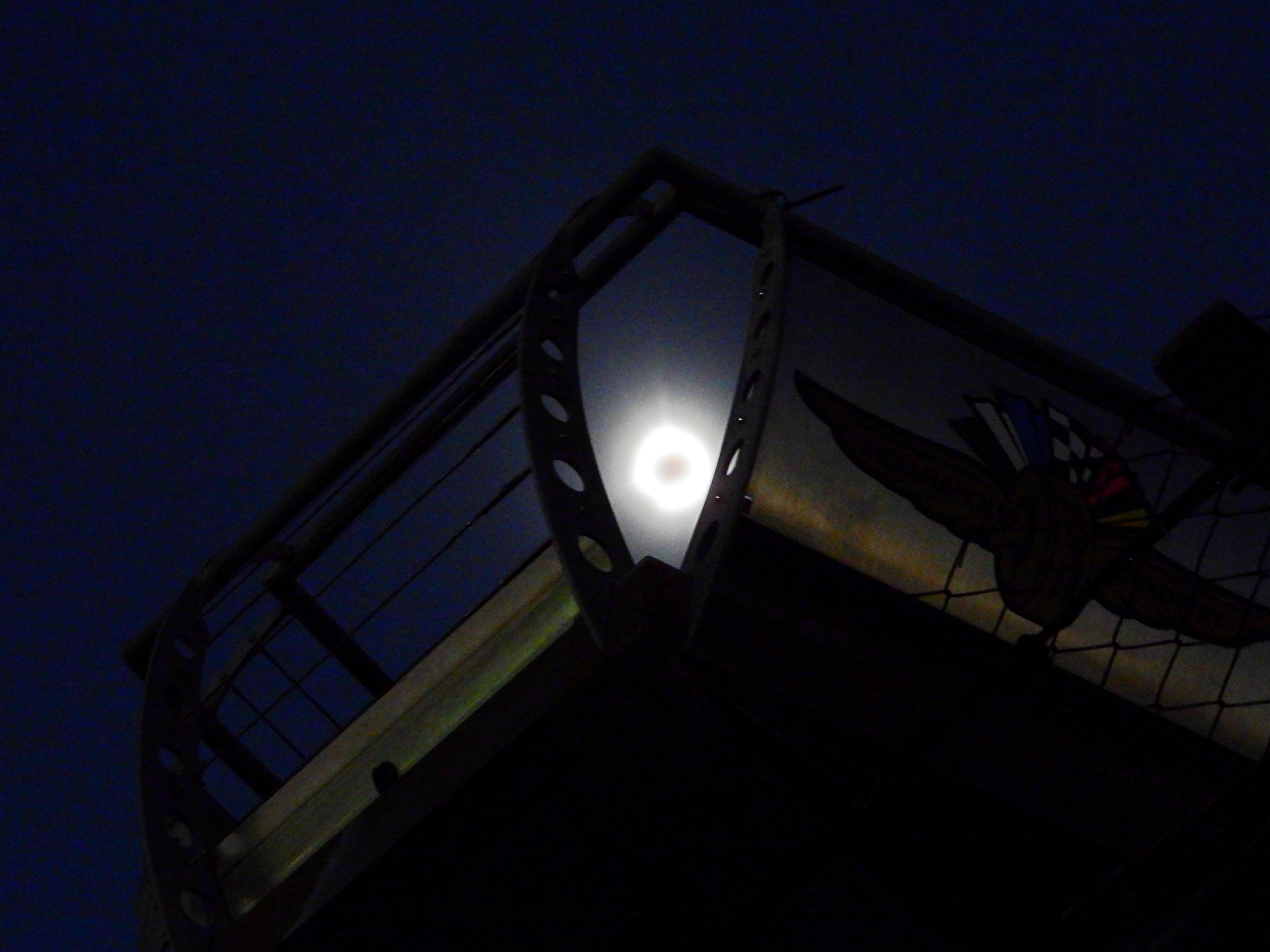
Totality over the Indianapolis Motor Speedway's flag stand

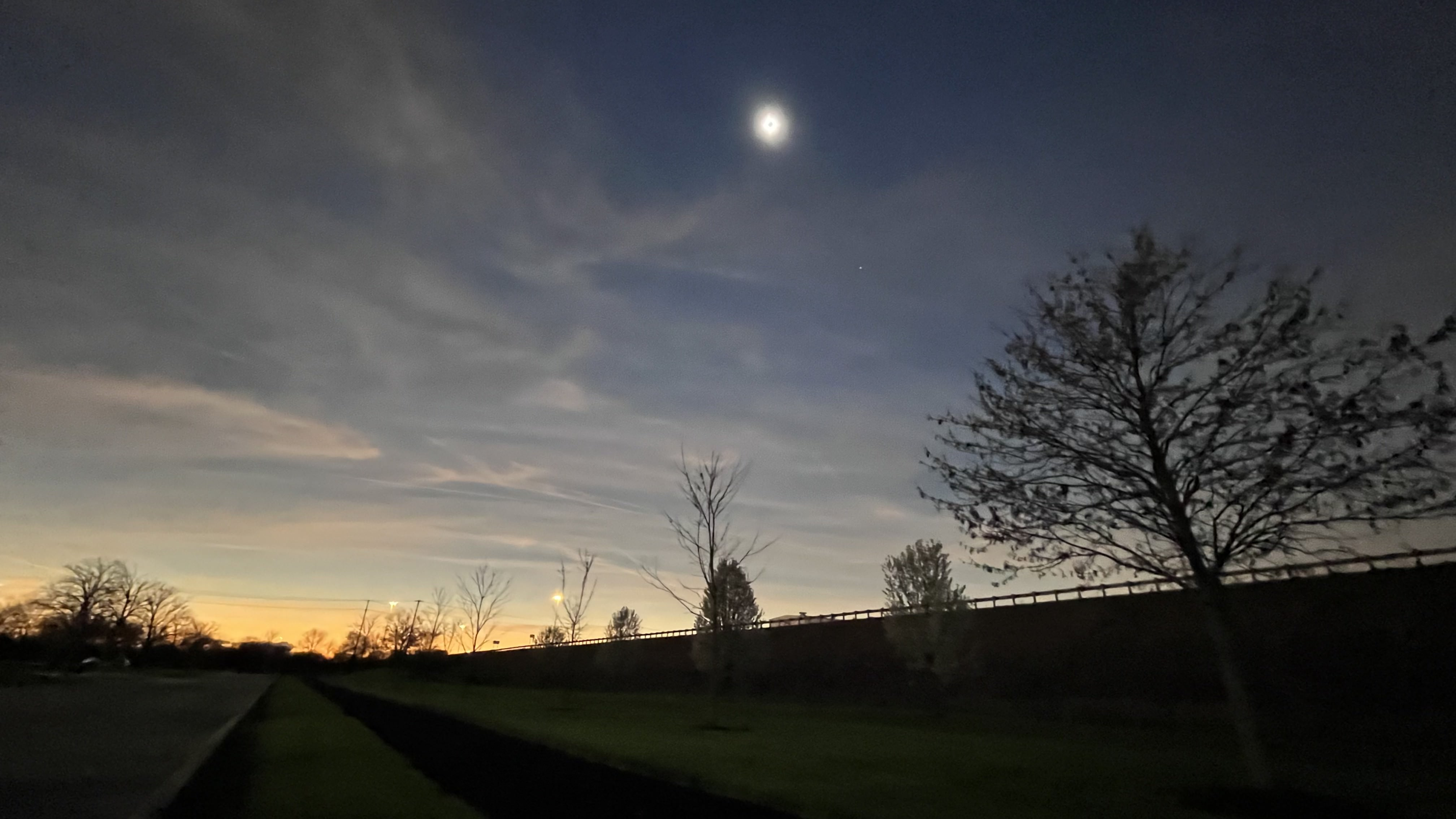
Totality over Sidney, Ohio

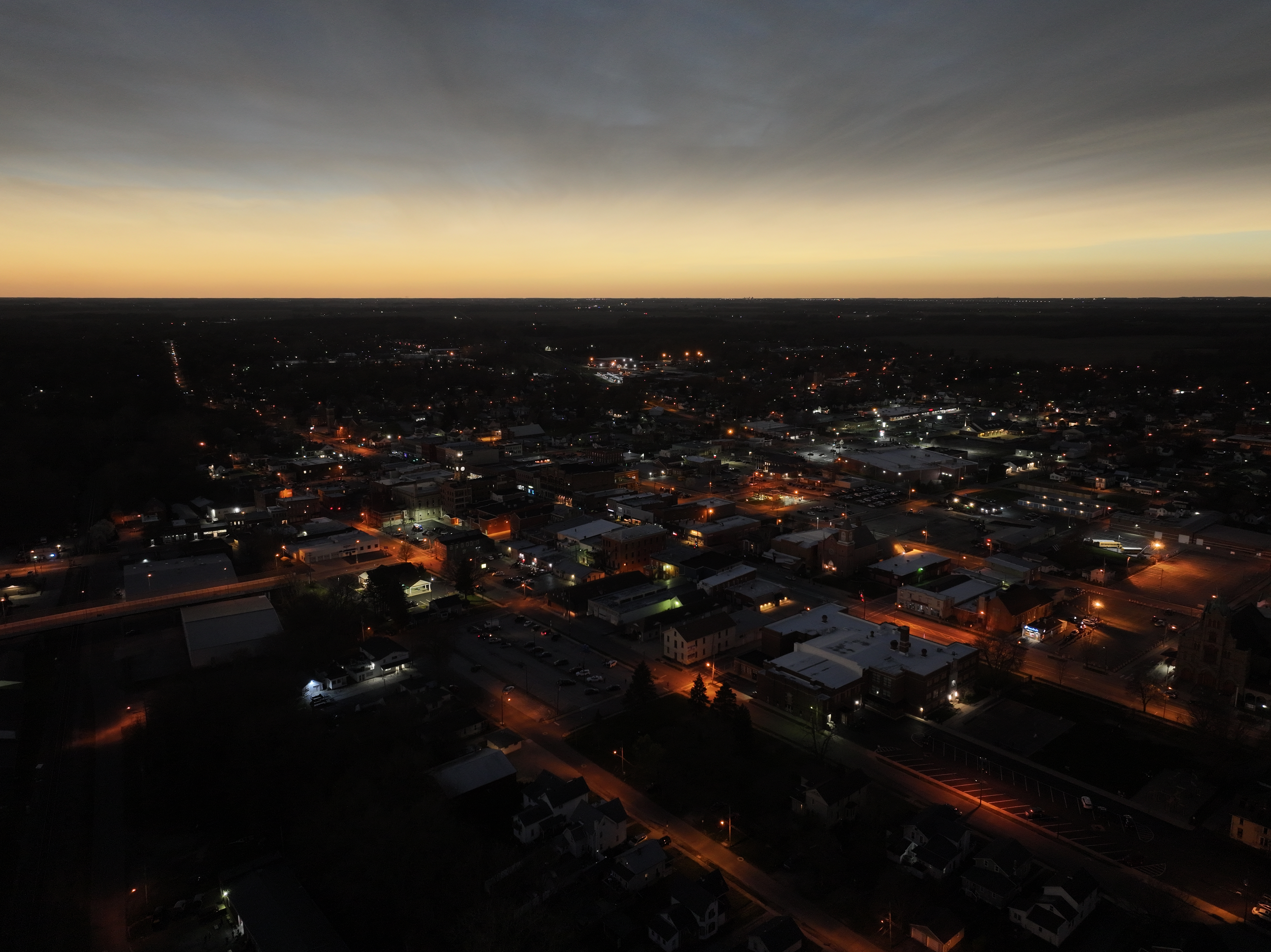
Overhead view of downtown Norwalk, Ohio during totality

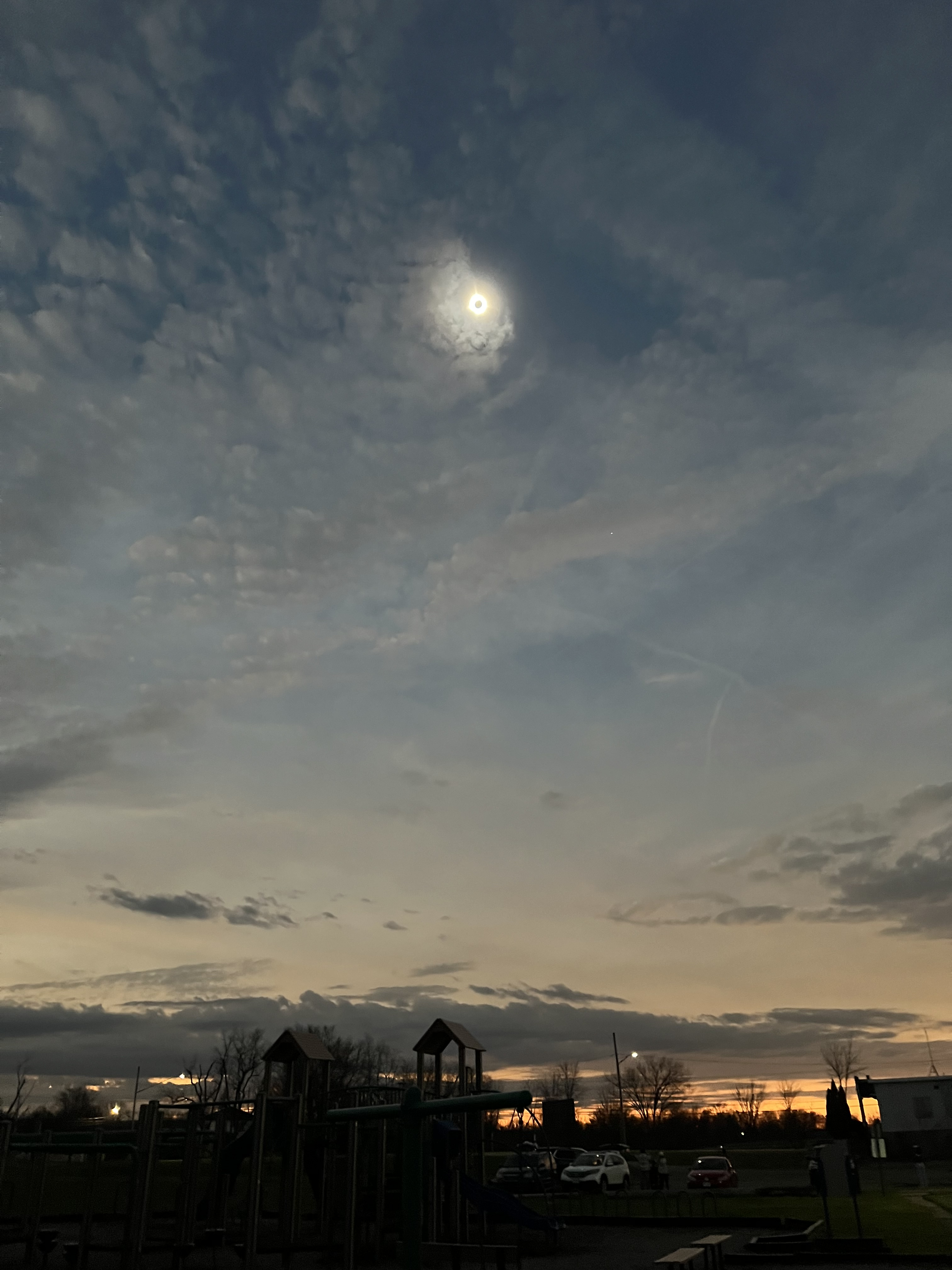
Totality over Ripley, New York

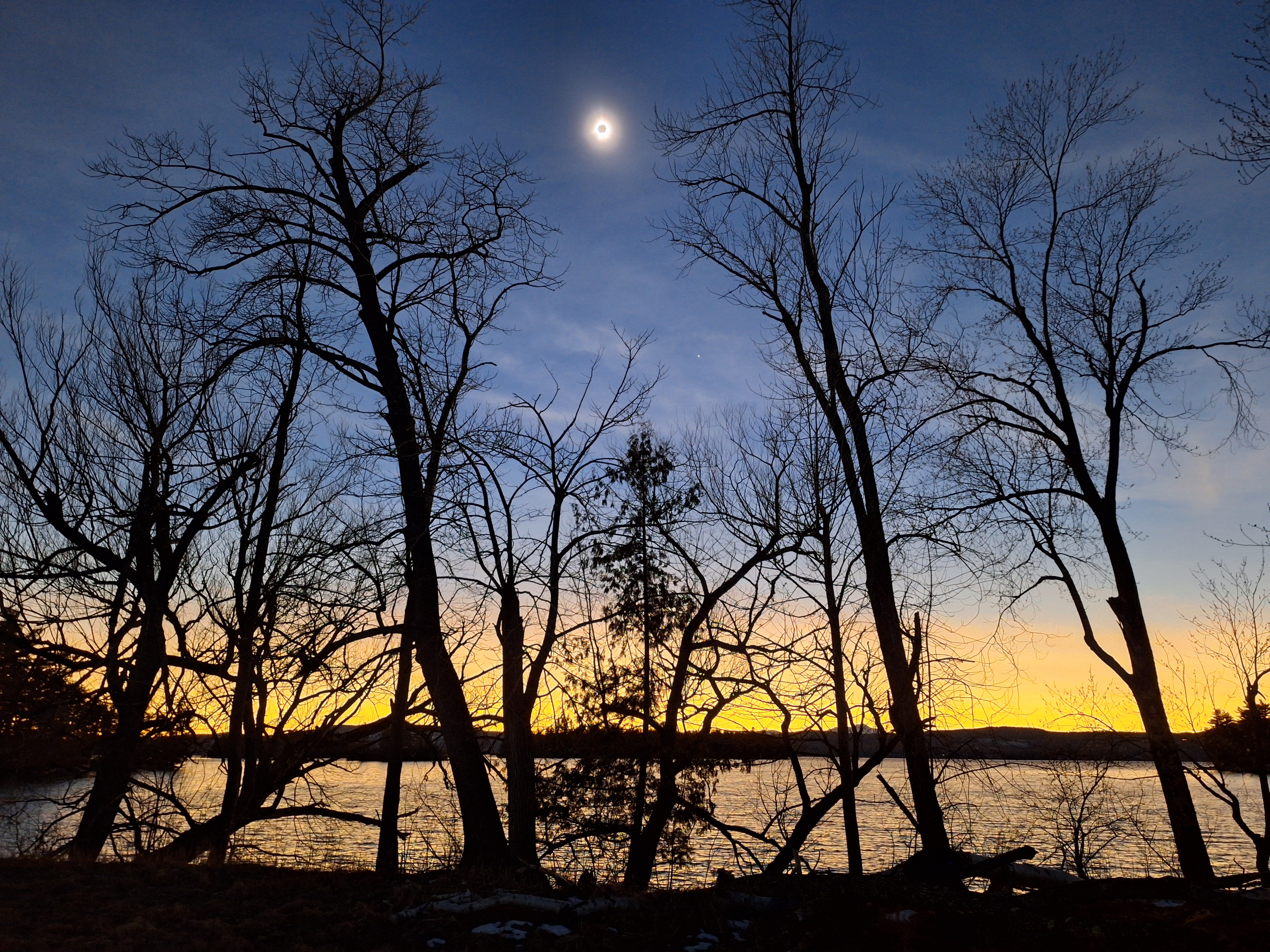
Totality over Derby, Vermont

==== Partial ====
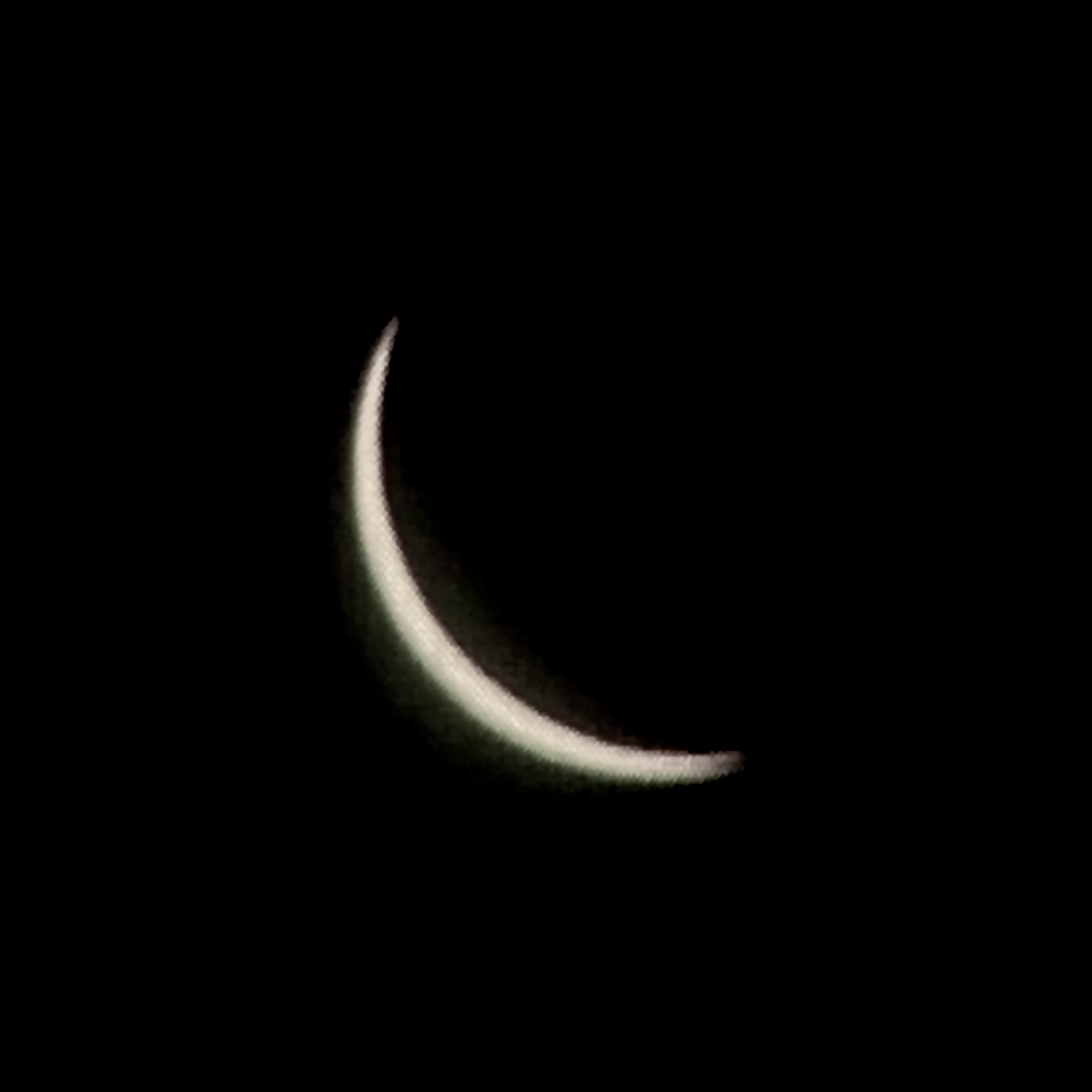
Partial as seen from San Nicolás de los Garza, Nuevo León

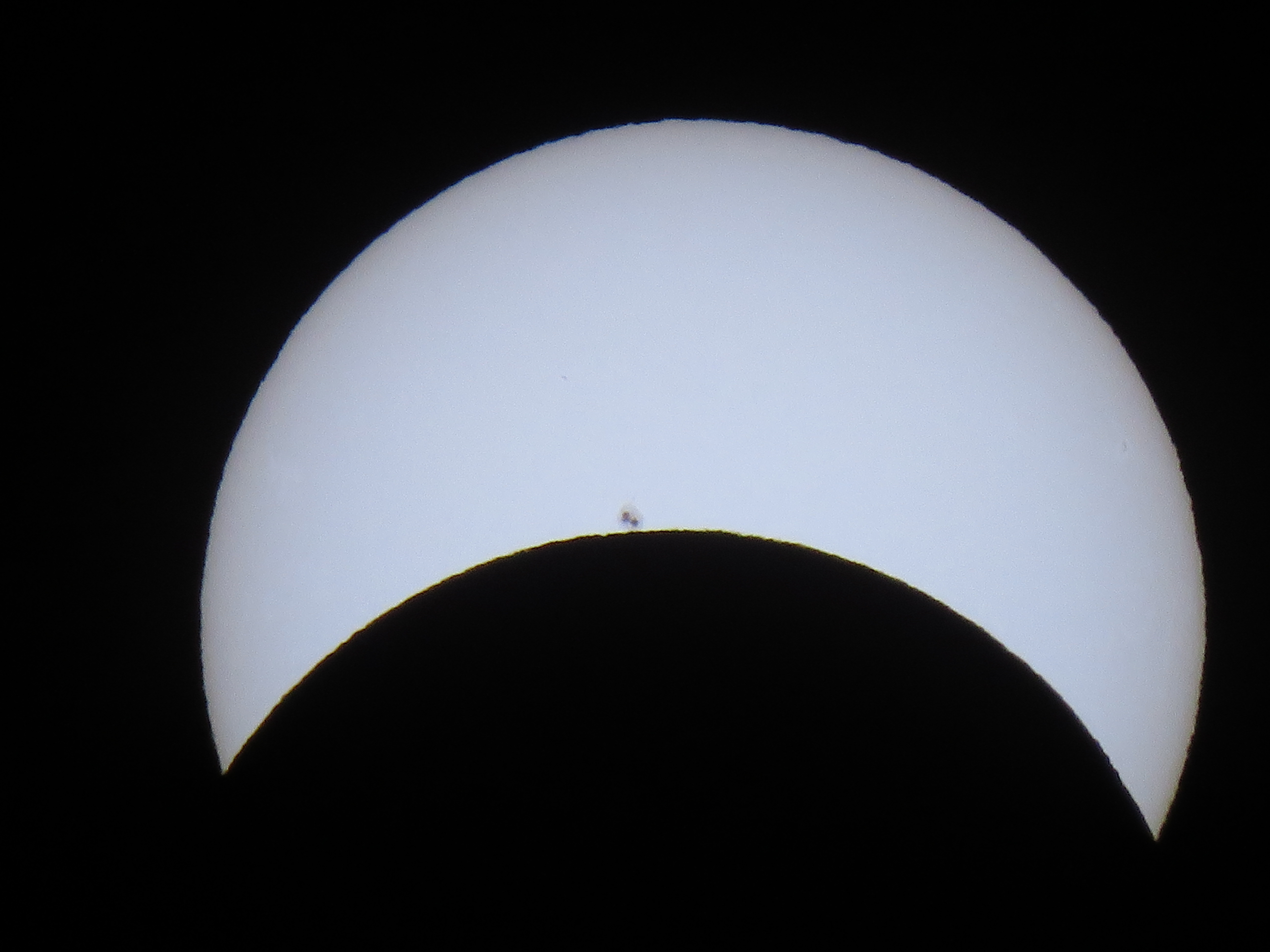
Partial as seen from Santa Ana, California

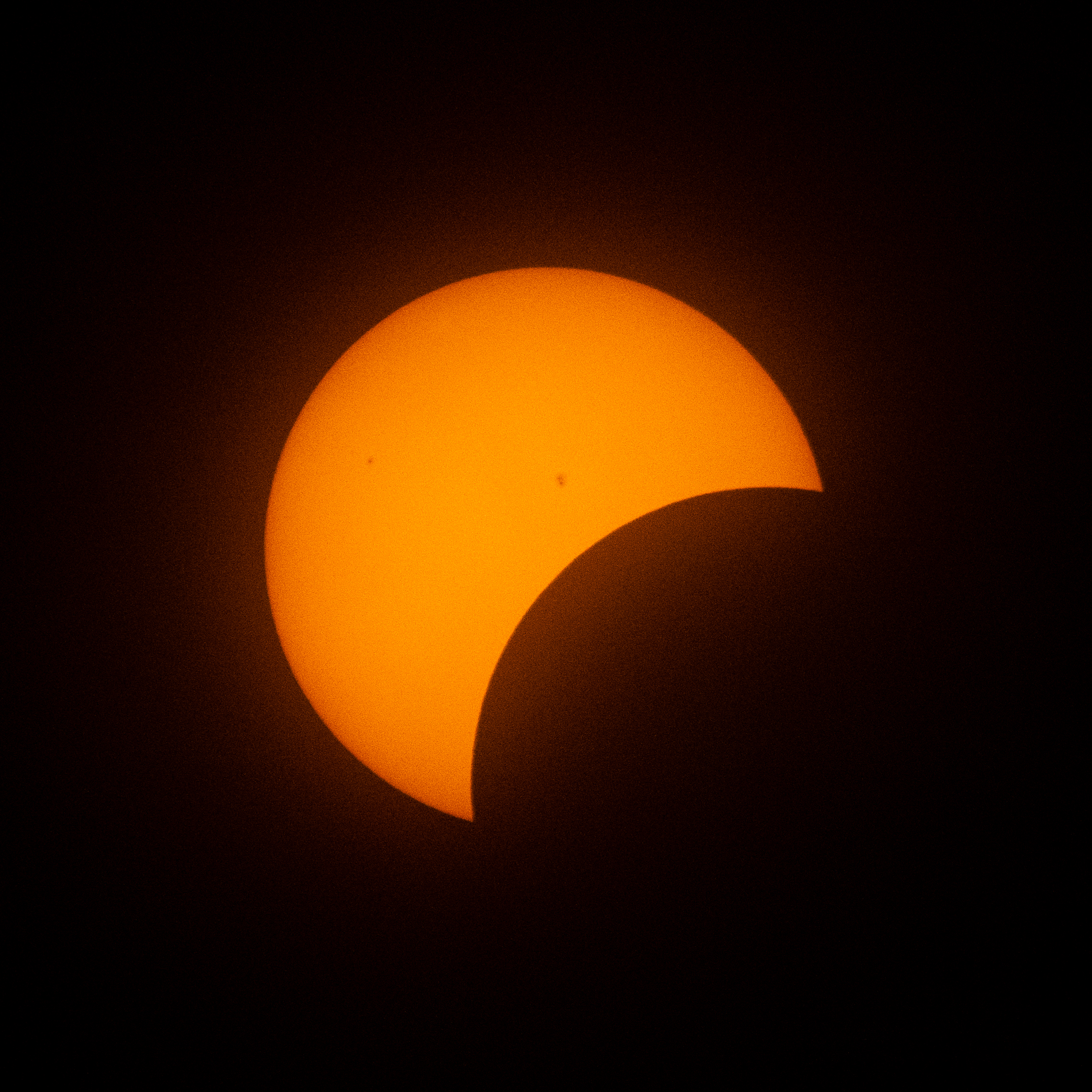
Partial as seen from Indianapolis, Indiana

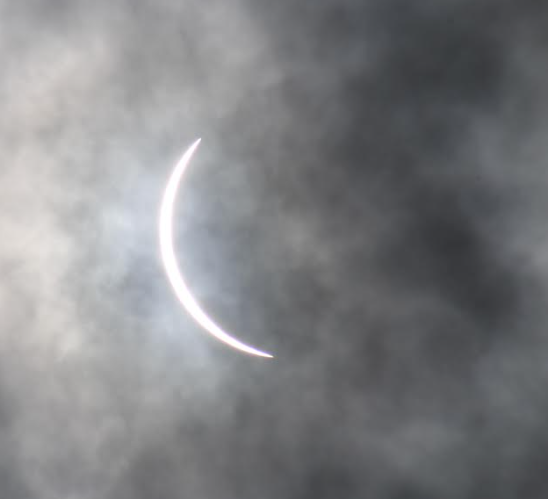
Partial as seen from Lexington, Kentucky

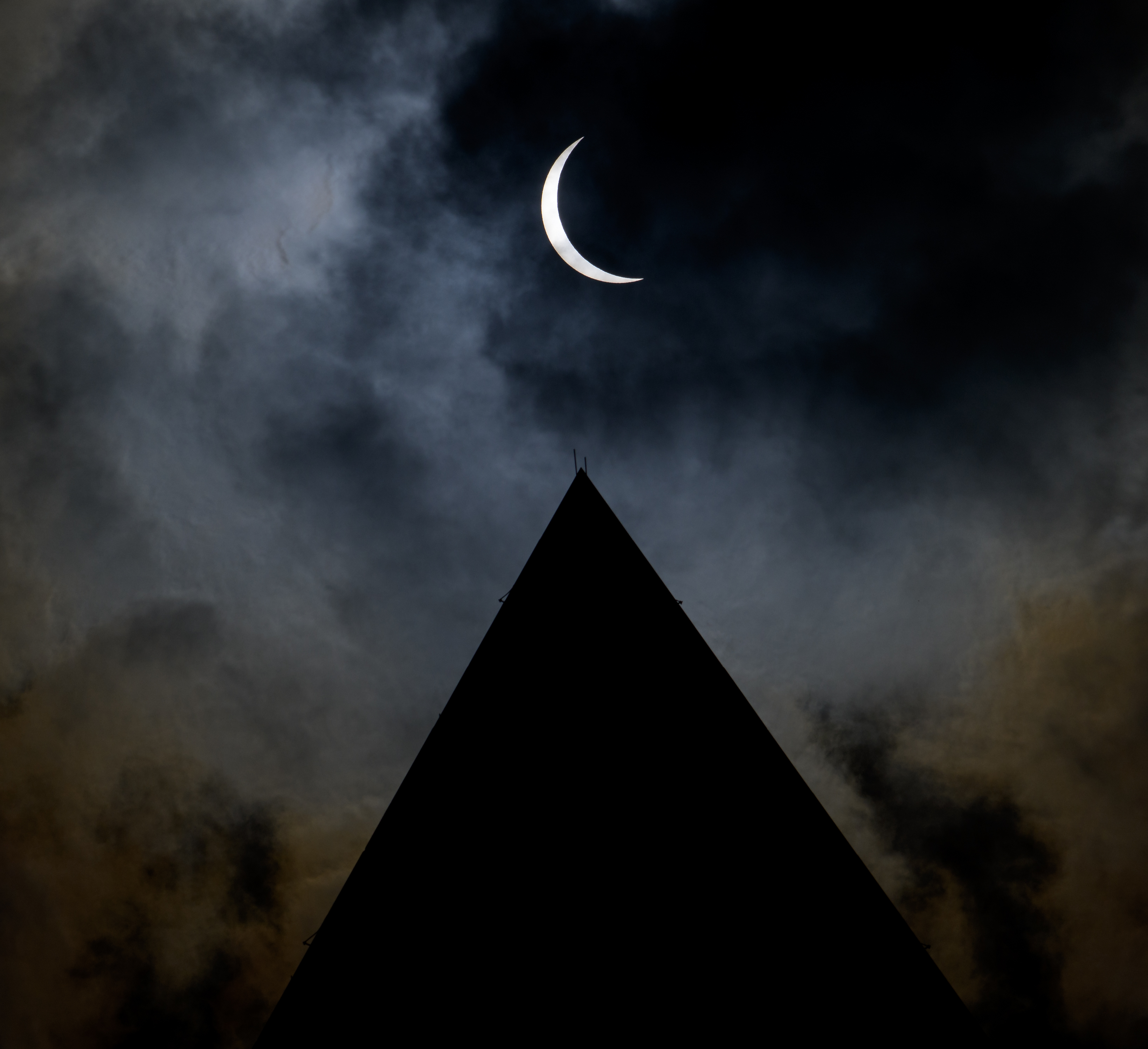
Partial as seen from Washington, D.C. above the Washington Monument

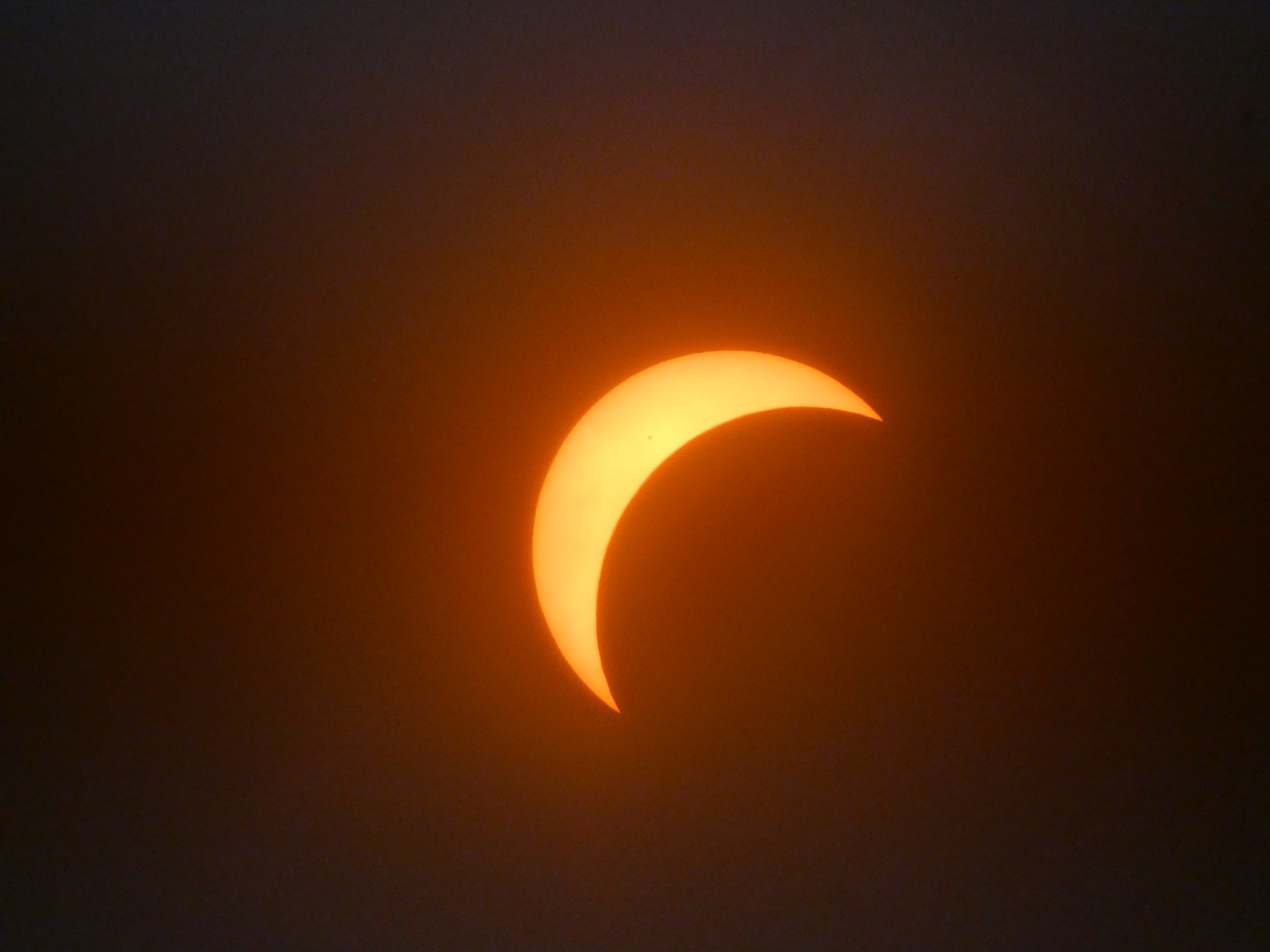
Partial as seen from Southeastern Pennsylvania

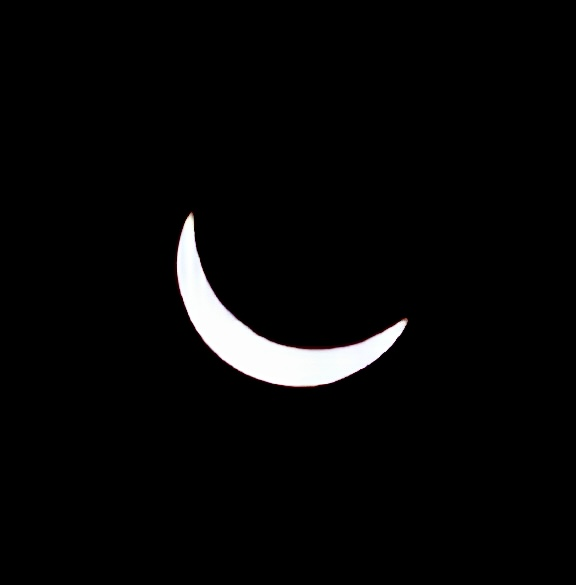
Partial as seen from Plainfield, New Jersey

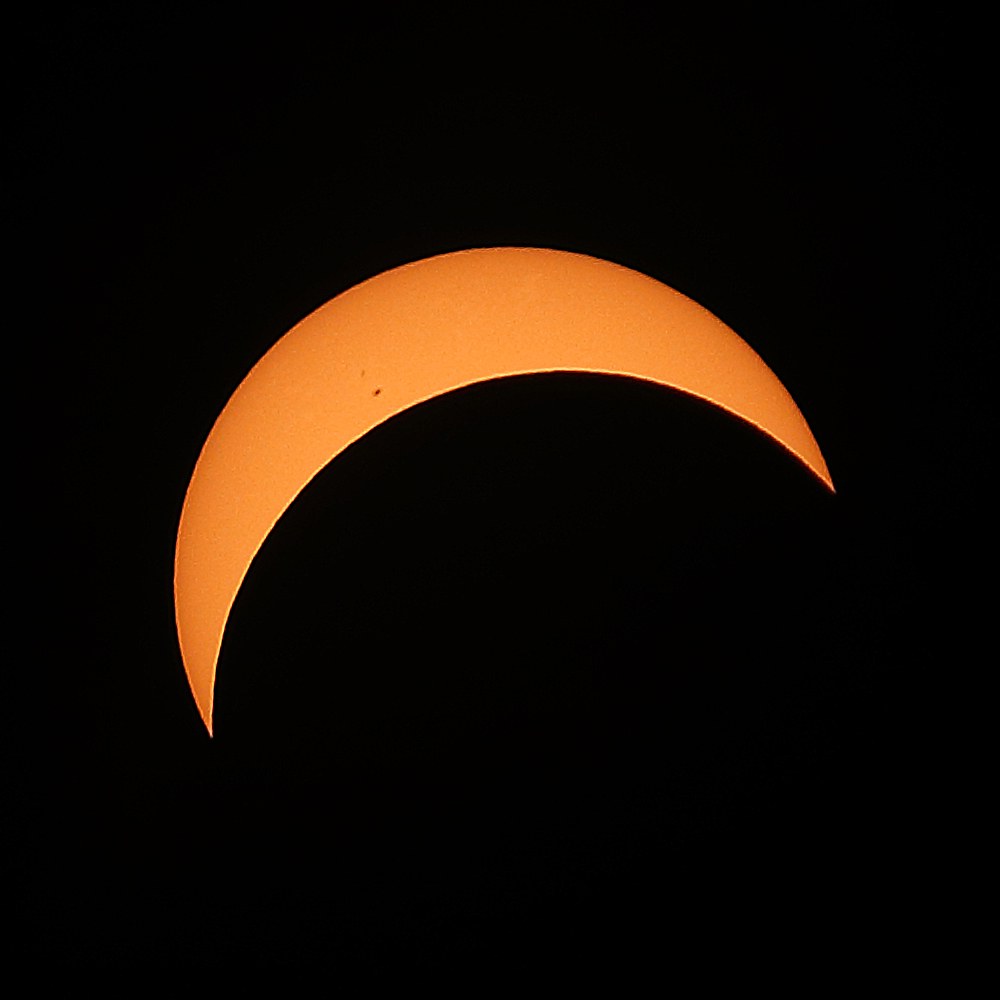
Partial as seen from Jackman, Maine

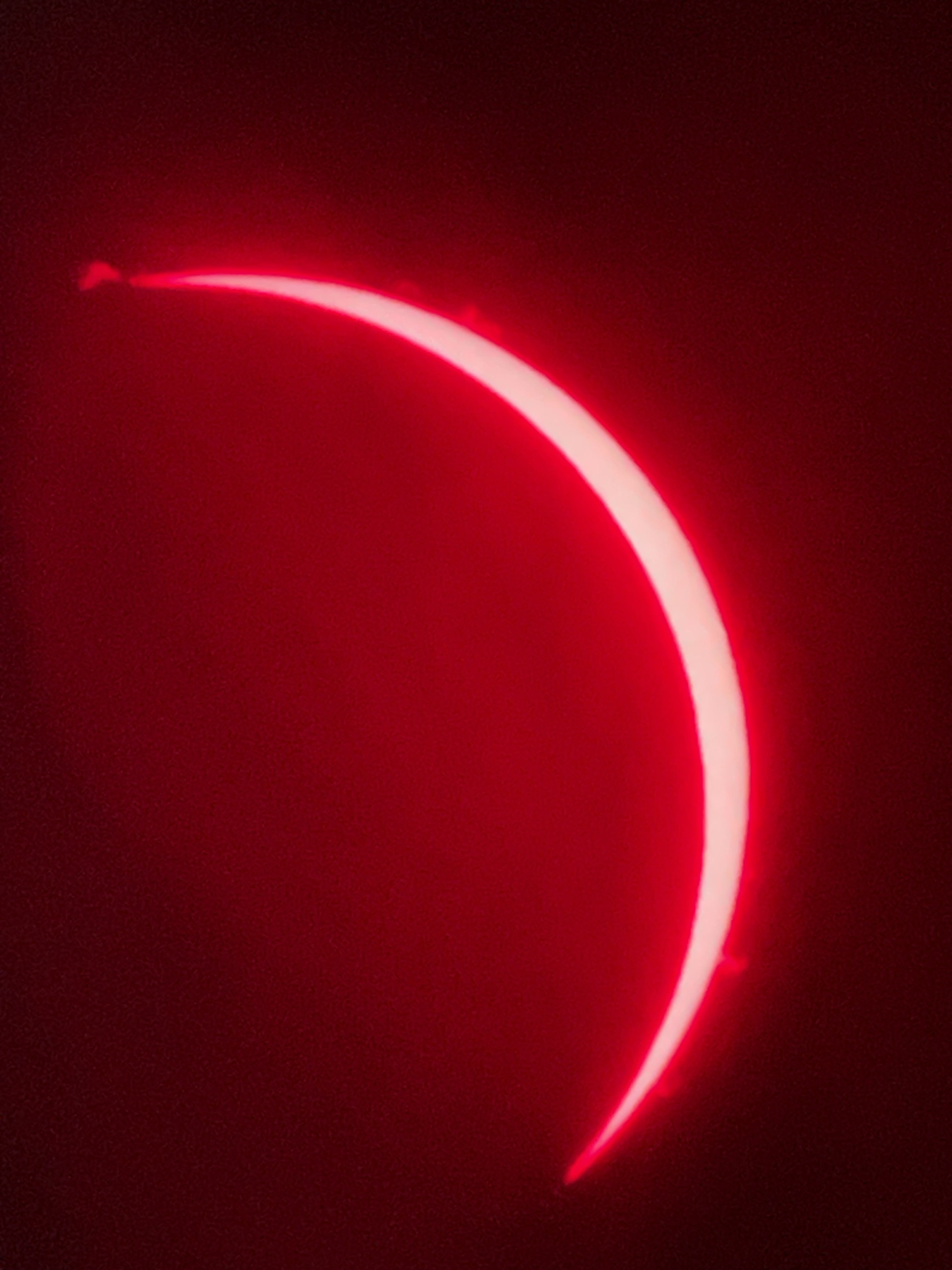
Partial as seen from Dexter, Ontario

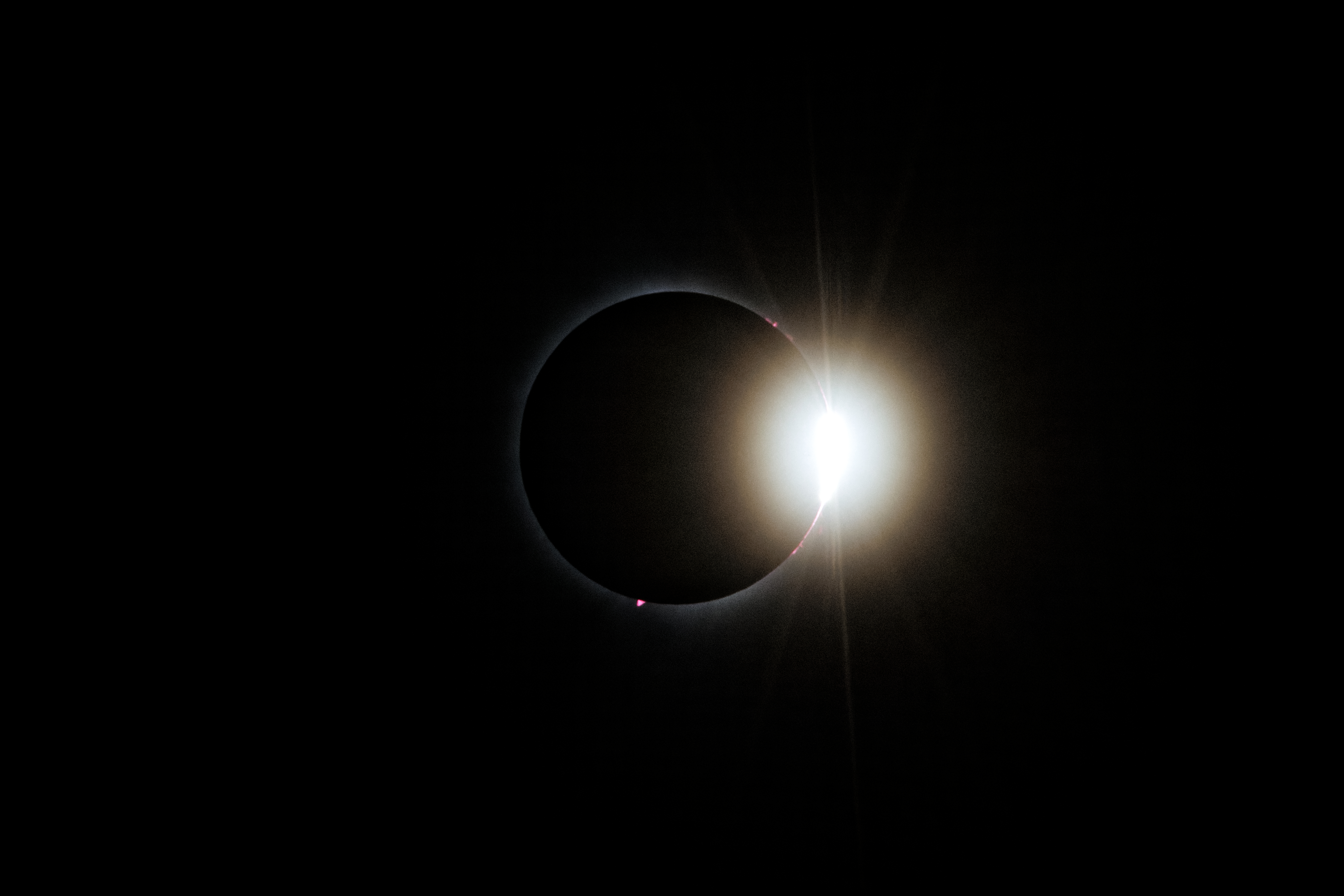
Post-totality diamond-ring effect as seen from Montreal, Quebec

==== Composites ====
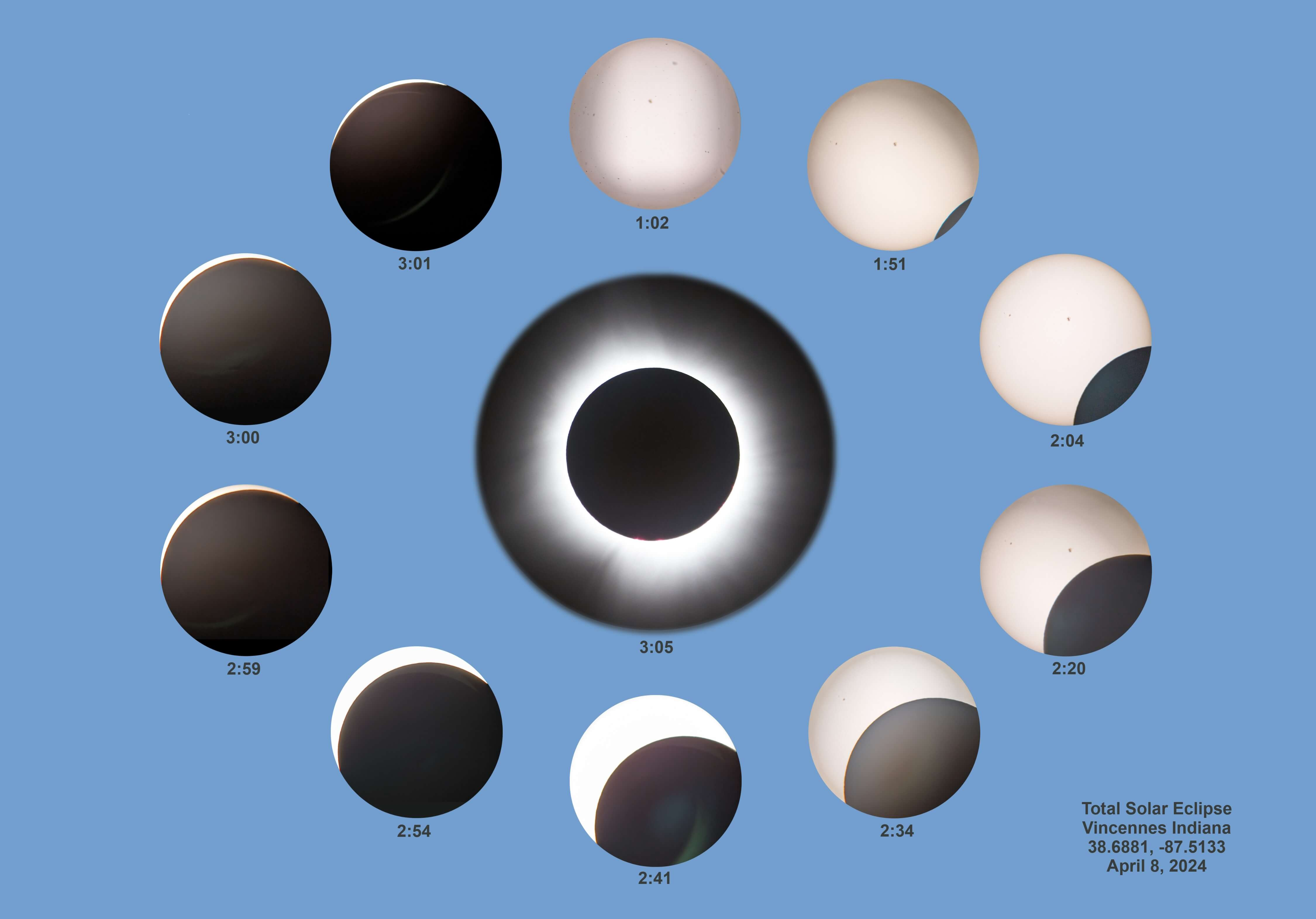
Eclipse progression as seen from Vincennes, Indiana

Eclipse progression as seen from Indianapolis, Indiana

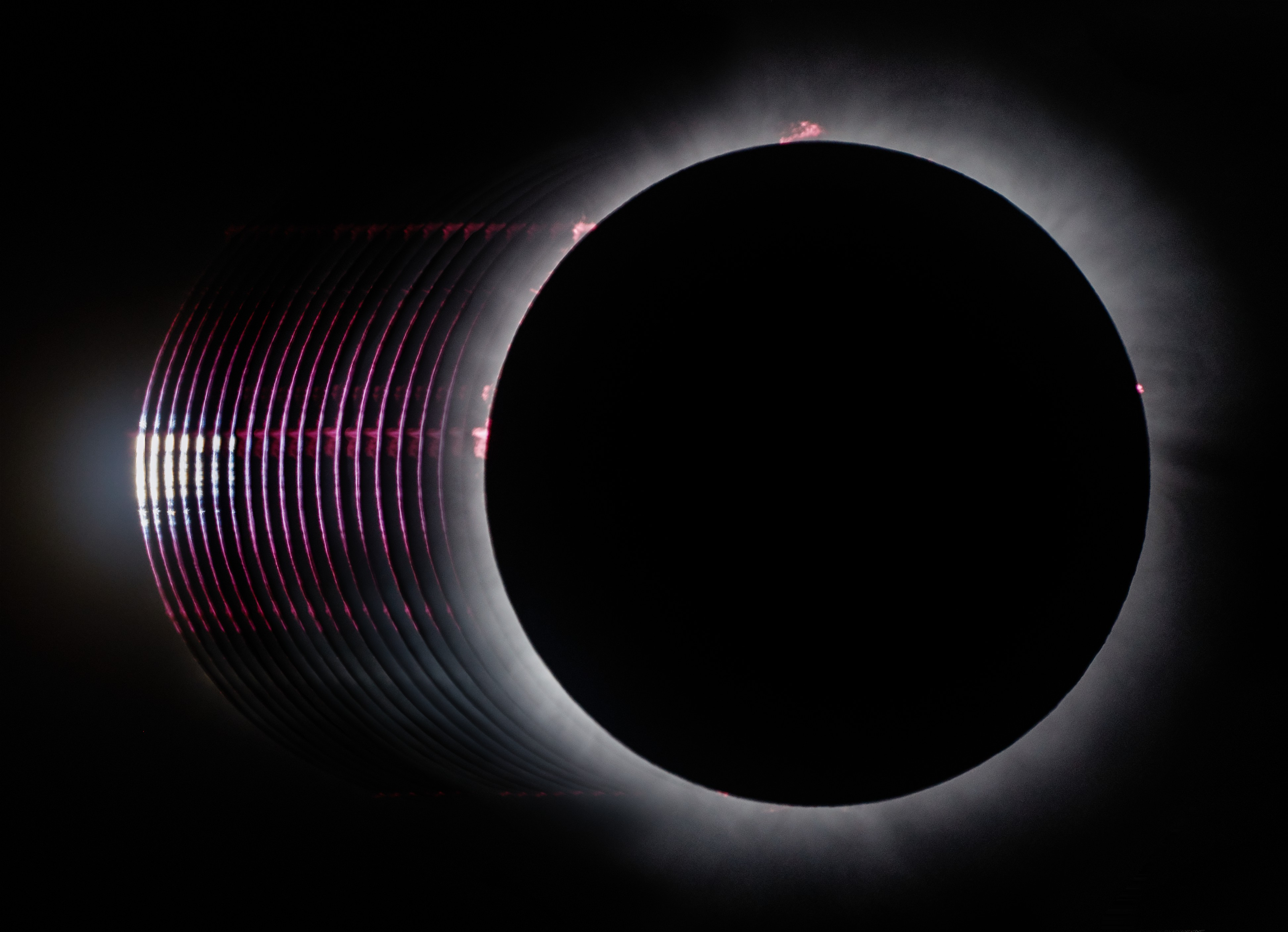
Eclipse progression from Baily's beads to totality as seen from Rondeau Provincial Park, Ontario

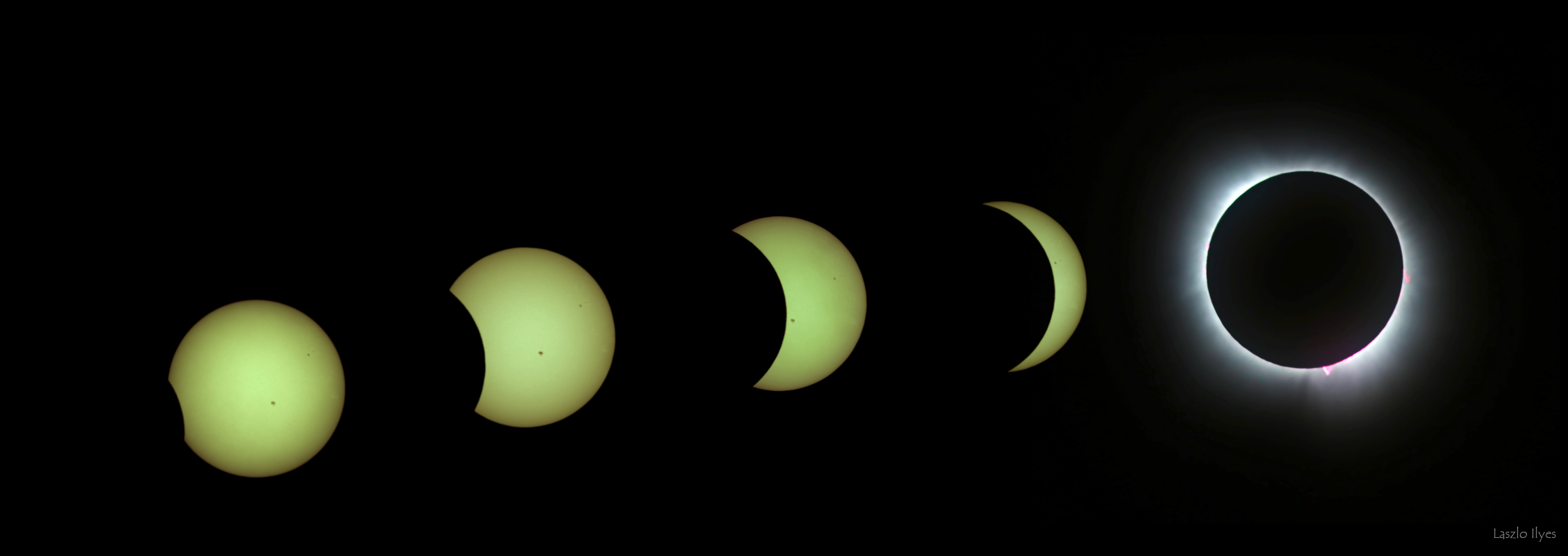
Eclipse progression to totality as seen from Cleveland, Ohio

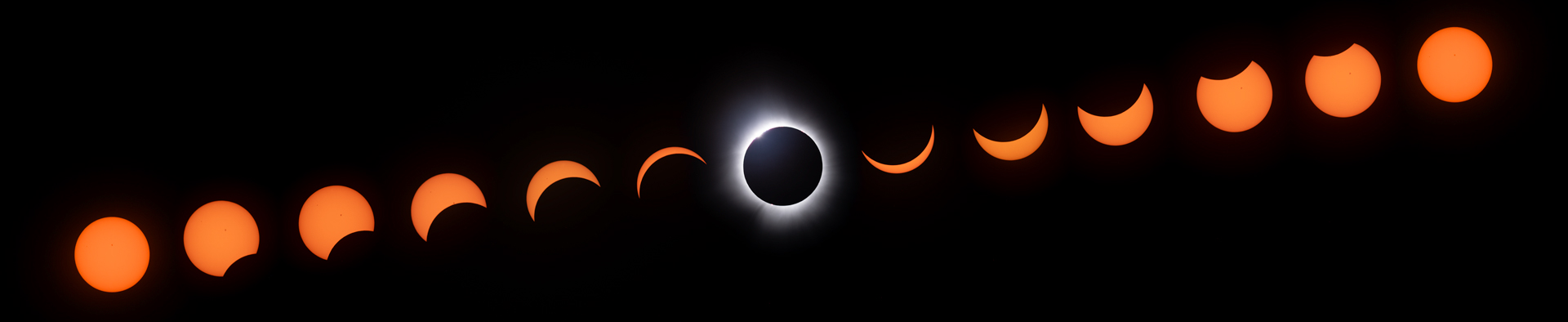
Eclipse progression as seen from Newport, Vermont

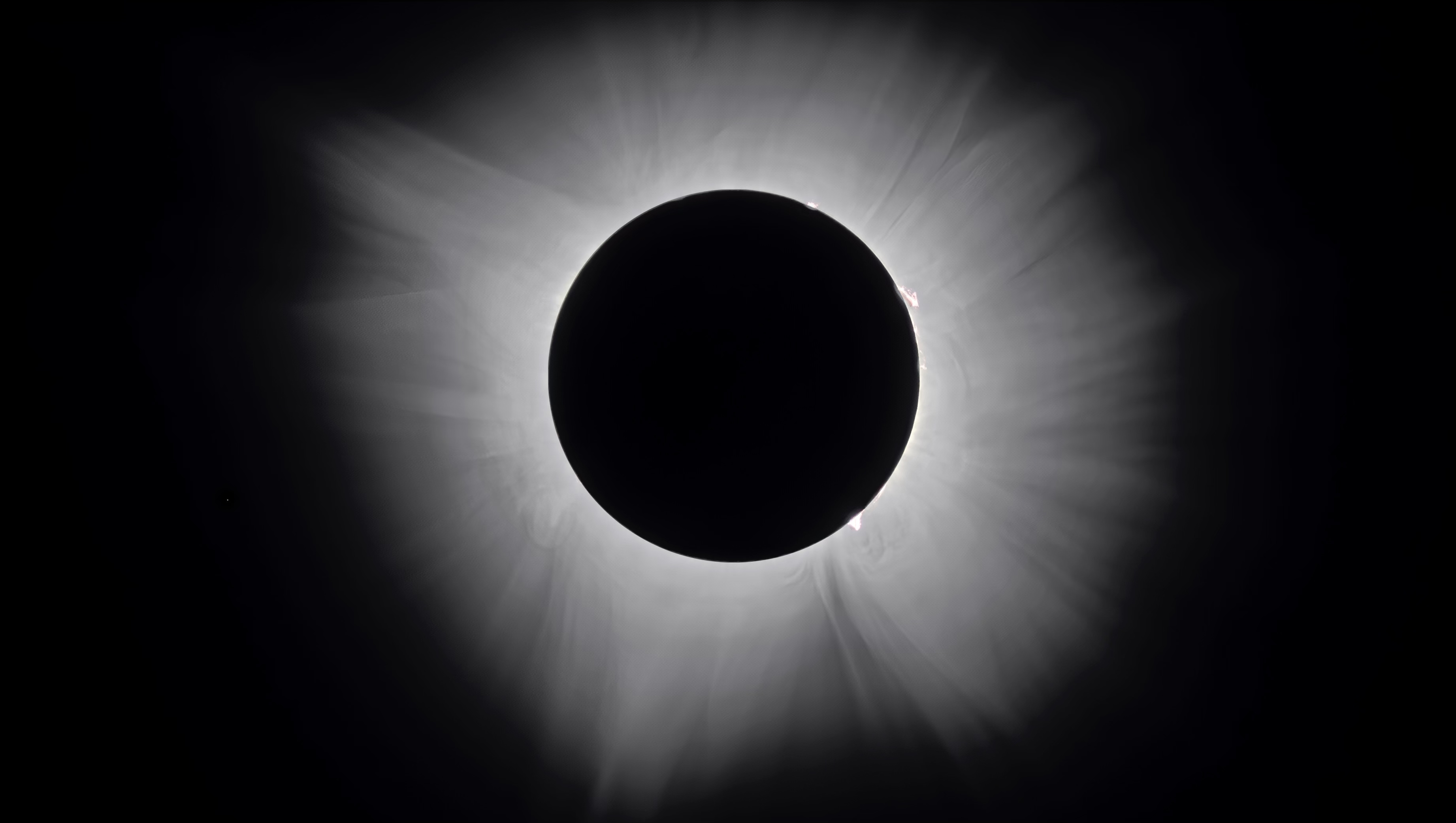
Composite image of totality as seen from Sherbrooke, Quebec reveals the corona

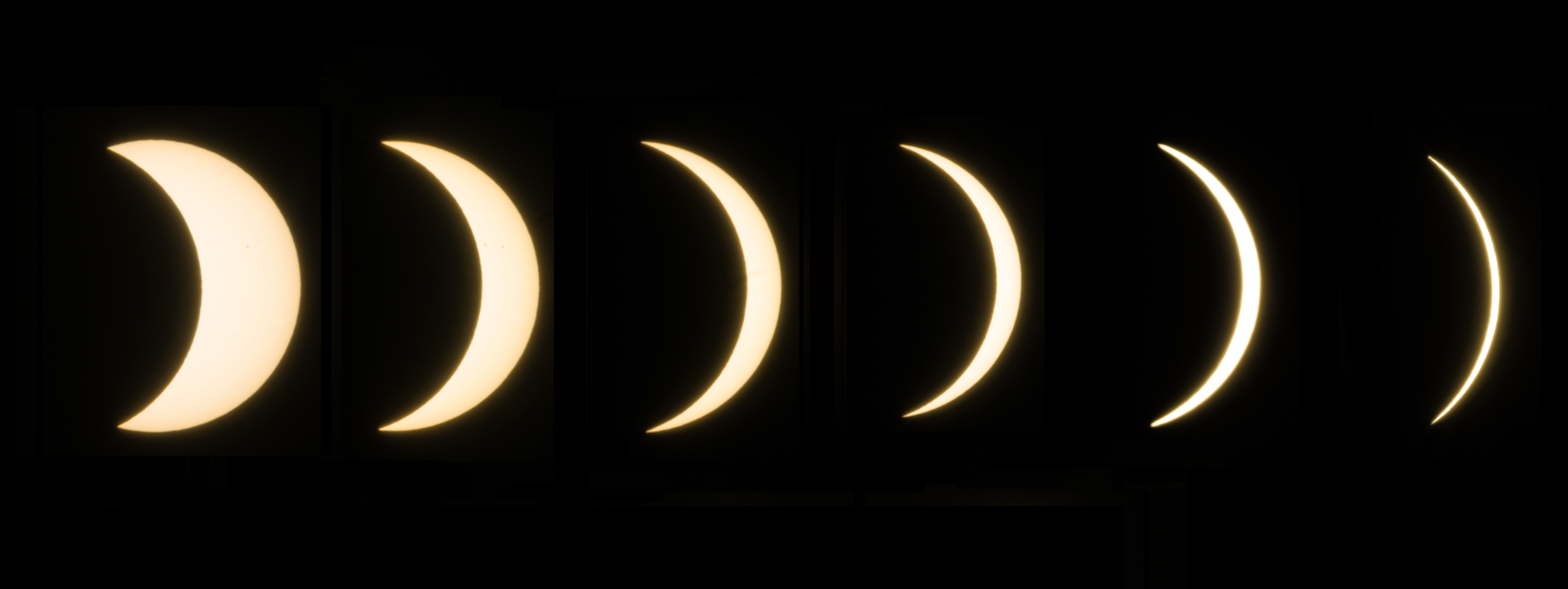
Eclipse progression as seen from Québec City, Quebec

==== Projections ====
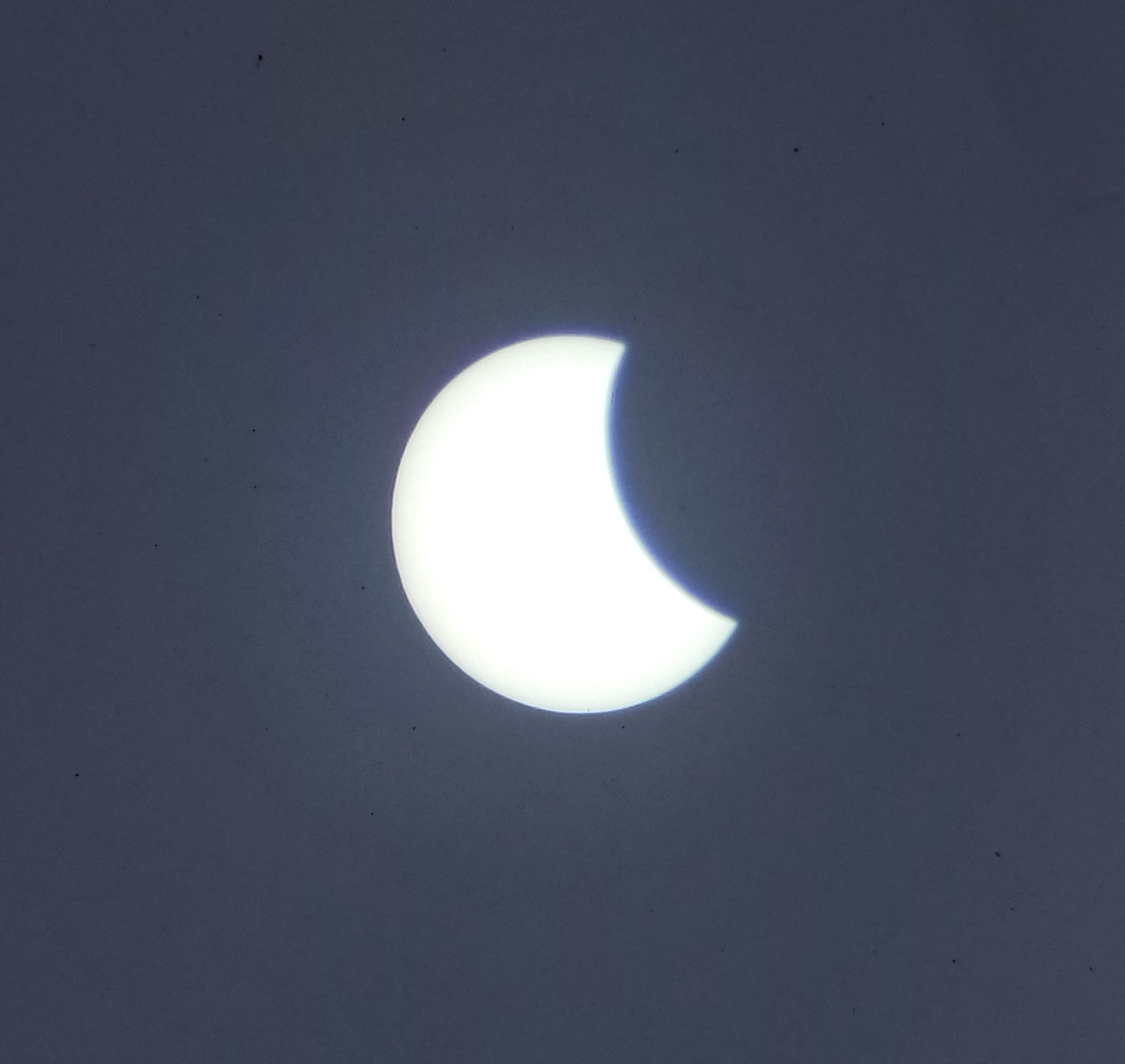
Photograph of the eclipse projected with binoculars in Puebla, Mexico

Video of the eclipse projected through the leaves of a tree in Puebla

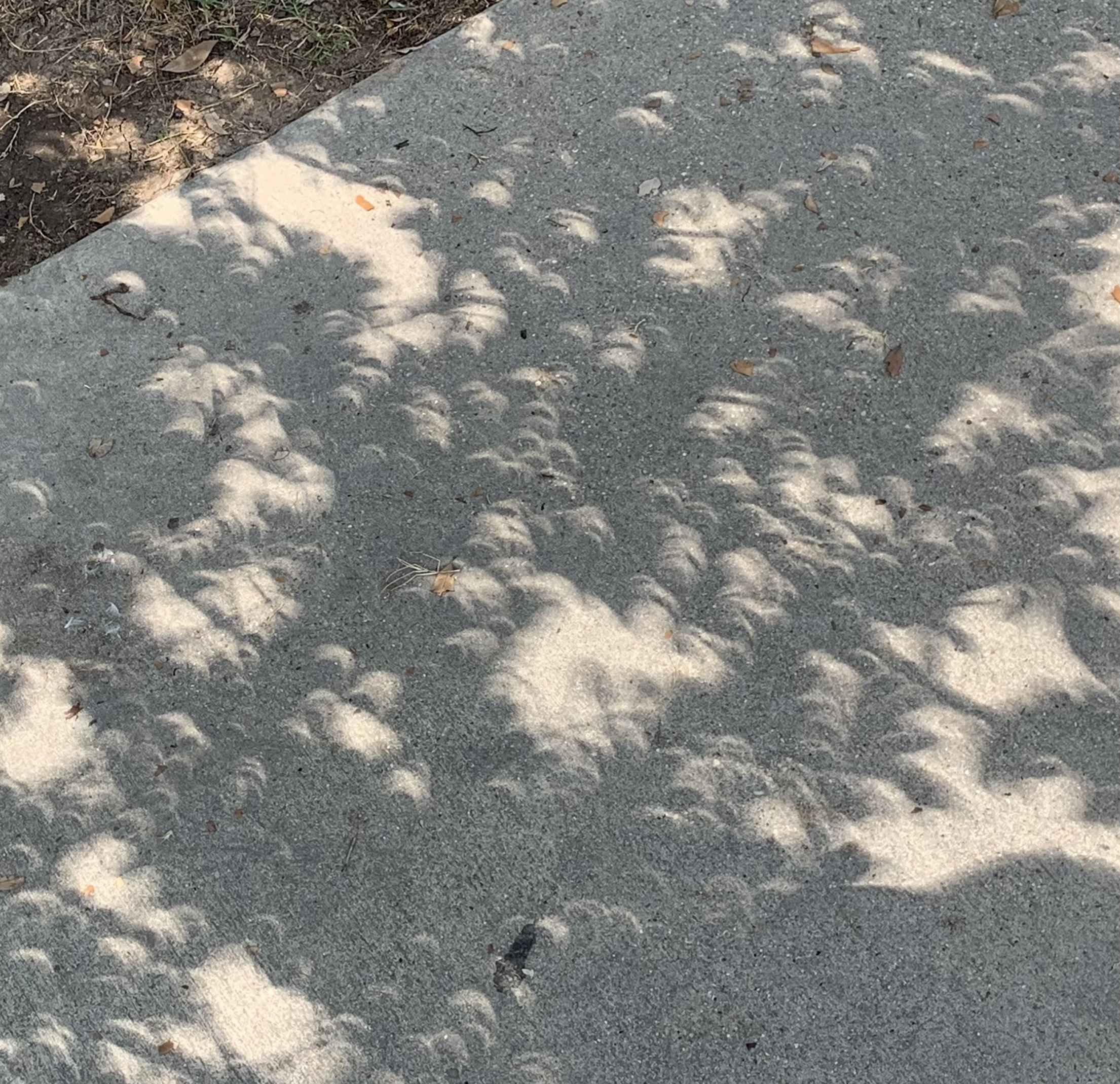
Leaf shadow projection of the eclipse in College Station, Texas

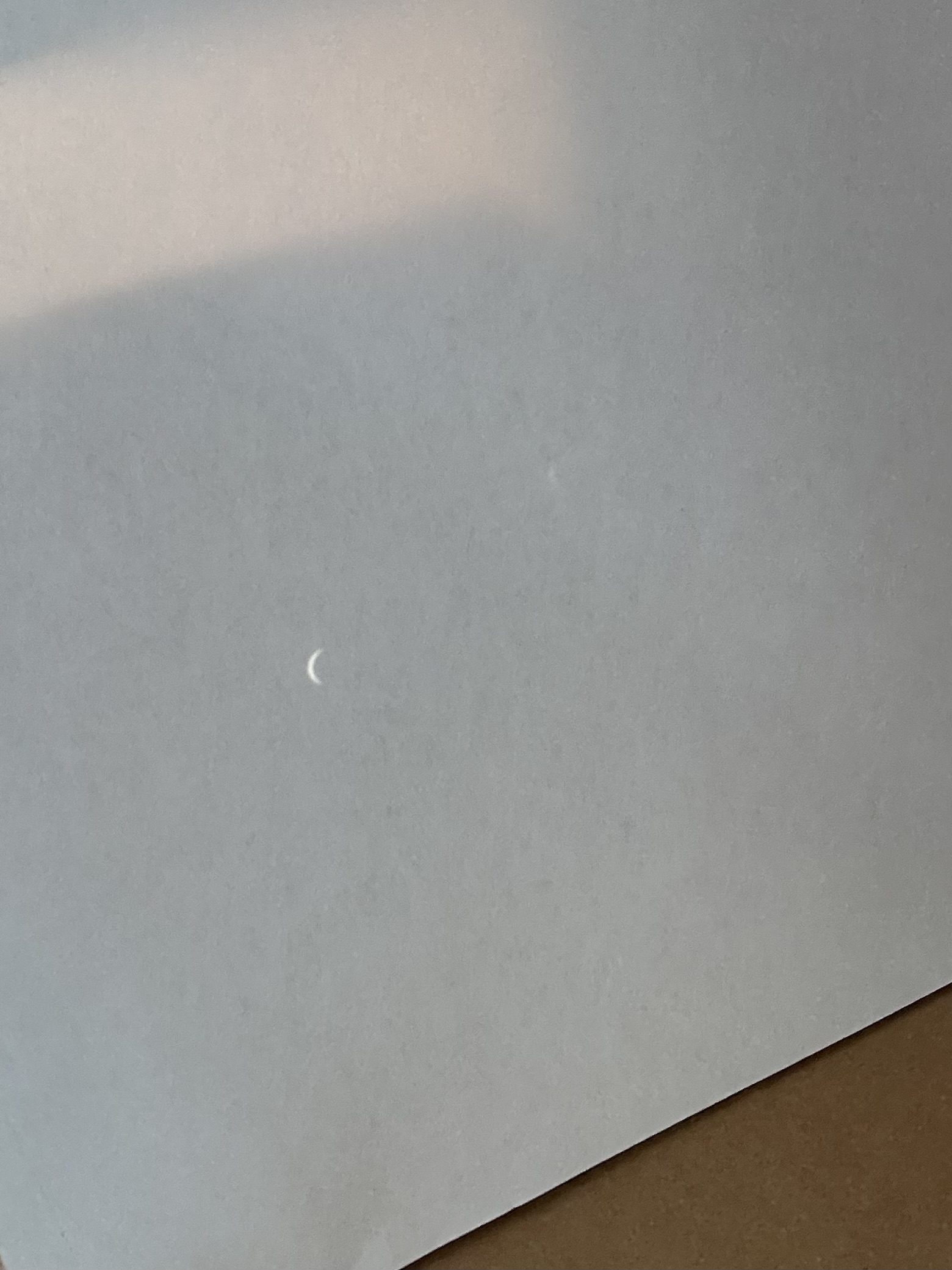
Cardboard box pinhole projection of the eclipse in Dallas, Texas

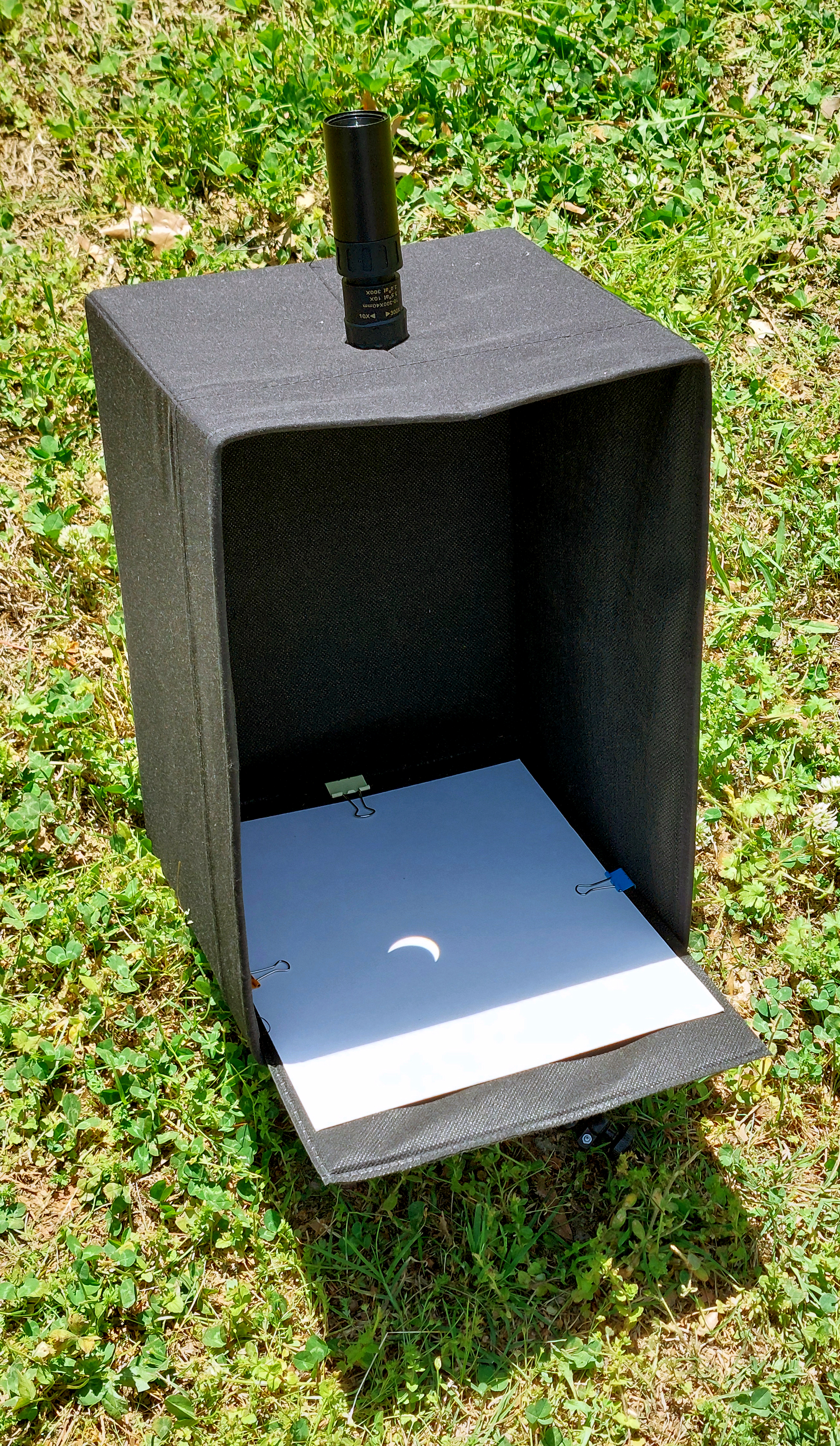
Camera obscura projection of the eclipse in Danville, Arkansas

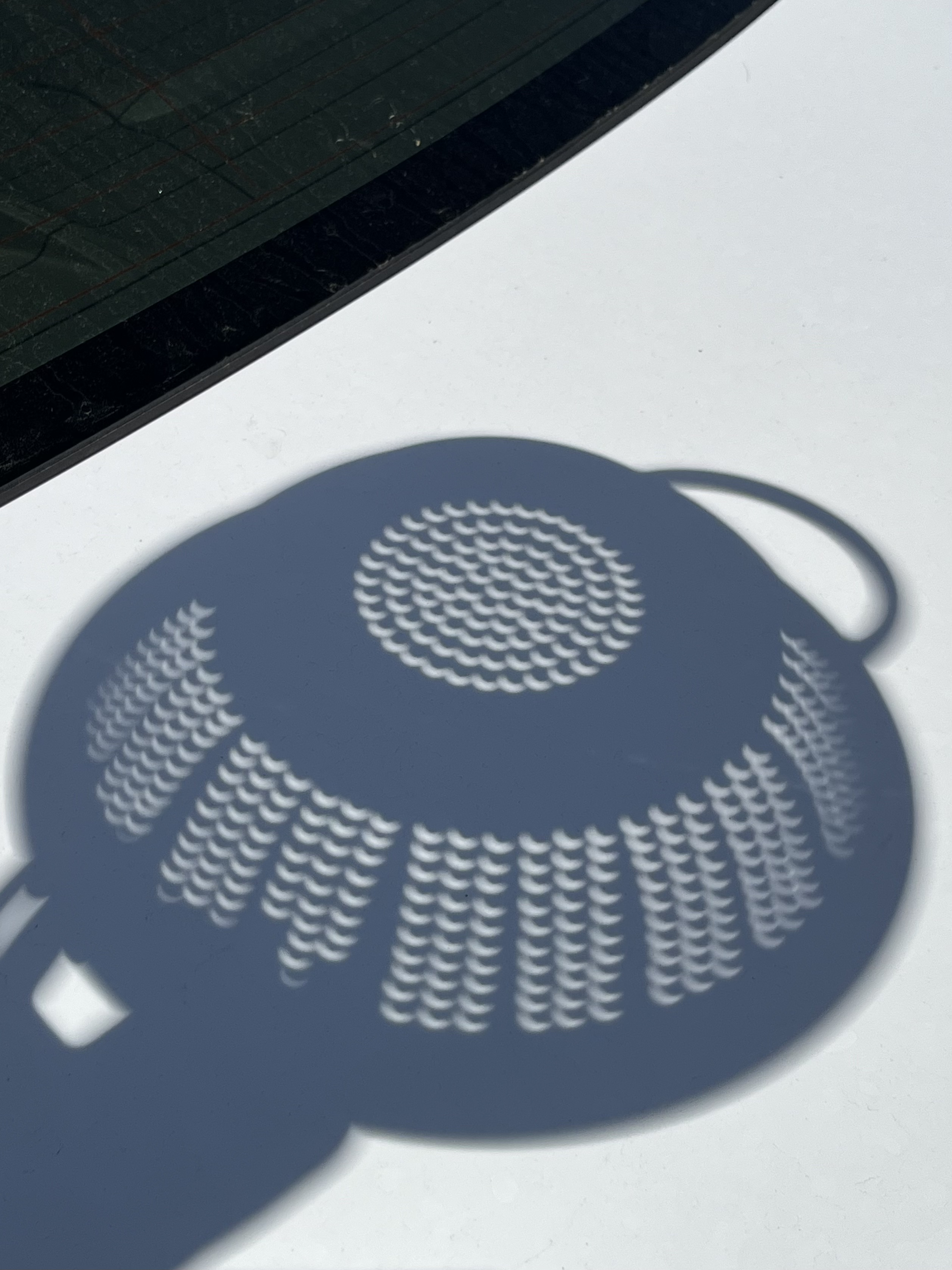
Colander projection of the eclipse in Corning, Arkansas

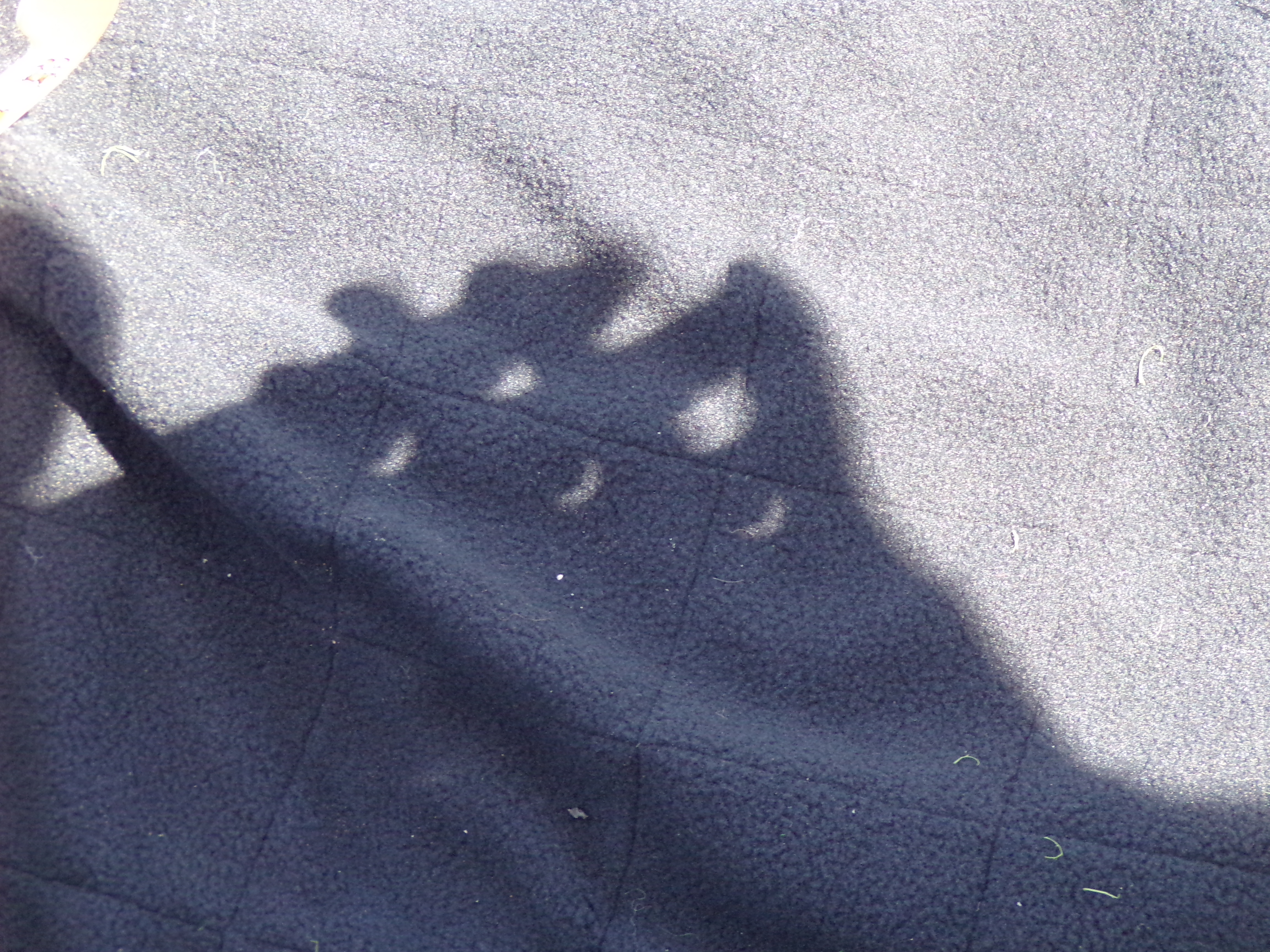
Interlaced finger projection of the eclipse in Marion, Illinois

== Total eclipse timing ==
Solar Eclipse of April 8, 2024 (Local Times)
Country or territory	City or place	Start of partial eclipse	Start of total eclipse	Maximum eclipse	End of total eclipse	End of partial eclipse	Duration of totality (min:s)	Duration of eclipse (hr:min)	Maximum magnitude
Mexico	Mazatlán	09:51:20	11:07:24	11:09:33	11:11:43	12:32:09	4:19	2:41	1.0217
Mexico	Durango	10:55:11	12:12:06	12:14:00	12:15:54	13:36:42	3:48	2:42	1.0136
US	Austin	12:17:10	13:36:08	13:37:01	13:37:55	14:58:09	1:47	2:41	1.0027
US	Waco	12:20:27	13:38:00	13:40:07	13:42:13	15:00:44	4:13	2:40	1.02
US	Fort Worth	12:22:26	13:40:26	13:41:43	13:43:00	15:01:50	2:34	2:39	1.0056
US	Arlington	12:22:44	13:40:23	13:42:03	13:43:44	15:02:10	3:21	2:39	1.0103
US	Irving	12:23:09	13:40:47	13:42:28	13:44:09	15:02:31	3:22	2:39	1.0104
US	Dallas	12:23:15	13:40:42	13:42:38	13:44:34	15:02:43	3:52	2:39	1.0152
US	Garland	12:23:44	13:41:10	13:43:06	13:45:02	15:03:07	3:52	2:39	1.0152
US	Plano	12:23:50	13:41:24	13:43:10	13:44:56	15:03:08	3:32	2:39	1.0118
US	Little Rock	12:33:29	13:51:36	13:52:50	13:54:04	15:11:35	2:28	2:38	1.0054
US	Sikeston	12:41:06	13:58:02	13:59:48	14:01:34	15:17:08	3:32	2:36	1.0129
US	Evansville	12:45:52	14:02:38	14:04:09	14:05:40	15:20:33	3:02	2:35	1.0092
US	Indianapolis	13:50:31	15:06:03	15:07:58	15:09:53	16:23:14	3:50	2:33	1.019
US	Dayton	13:53:29	15:09:28	15:10:50	15:12:12	16:25:37	2:44	2:32	1.0075
US	Riverside	13:53:37	15:09:37	15:10:57	15:12:17	16:25:42	2:40	2:32	1.0072
US	Toledo	13:56:53	15:12:23	15:13:16	15:14:10	16:27:01	1:47	2:30	1.0032
US	Akron	13:59:07	15:14:13	15:15:38	15:17:02	16:29:07	2:49	2:30	1.0085
US	Cleveland	13:59:20	15:13:45	15:15:40	15:17:35	16:29:01	3:50	2:30	1.0225
US	Erie	14:02:23	15:16:22	15:18:14	15:20:05	16:30:52	3:43	2:28	1.0202
Canada	Hamilton	14:03:52	15:18:12	15:19:07	15:20:02	16:31:12	1:50	2:27	1.0036
Canada	Burlington	14:04:02	15:18:30	15:19:14	15:19:58	16:31:16	1:28	2:27	1.0024
Canada	Oakville	14:04:20	15:19:18	15:19:28	15:19:39	16:31:24	0:21	2:27	1.0004
US	Buffalo	14:04:54	15:18:20	15:20:13	15:22:06	16:32:11	3:46	2:27	1.0254
US	Rochester	14:06:58	15:20:08	15:21:58	15:23:47	16:33:27	3:39	2:26	1.0213
Canada	Kingston	14:09:30	15:22:15	15:23:47	15:25:19	16:34:30	3:04	2:25	1.0121
Canada	Montreal	14:14:26	15:26:49	15:27:33	15:28:17	16:36:53	1:28	2:22	1.0026
Canada	Longueuil	14:14:34	15:26:52	15:27:39	15:28:26	16:36:58	1:34	2:22	1.003
US	Montpelier	14:14:57	15:27:38	15:28:27	15:29:15	16:37:55	1:37	2:23	1.0031
Canada	Sherbrooke	14:16:36	15:27:42	15:29:25	15:31:08	16:38:17	3:26	2:22	1.0203

== Characteristics ==
=== Magnitude ===
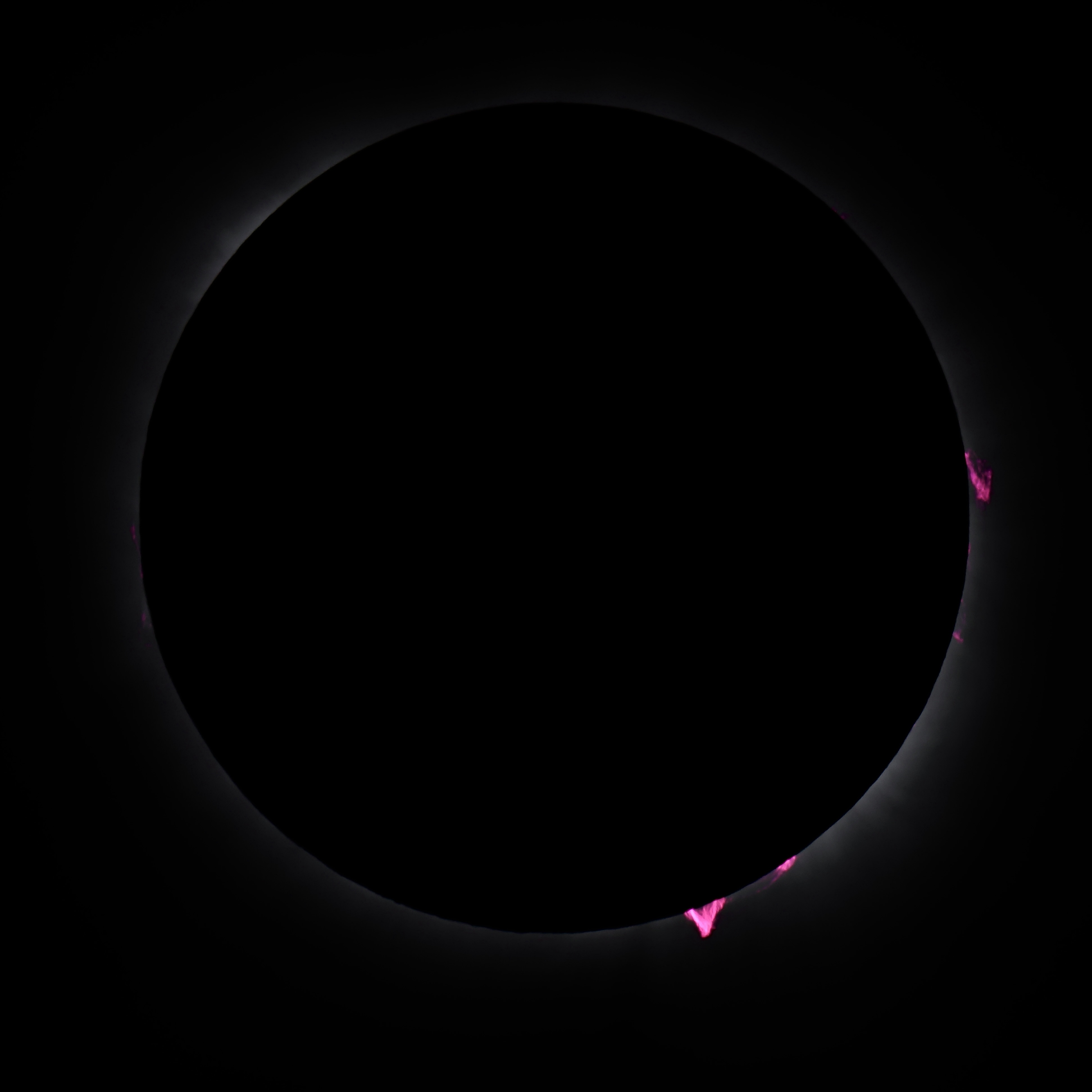
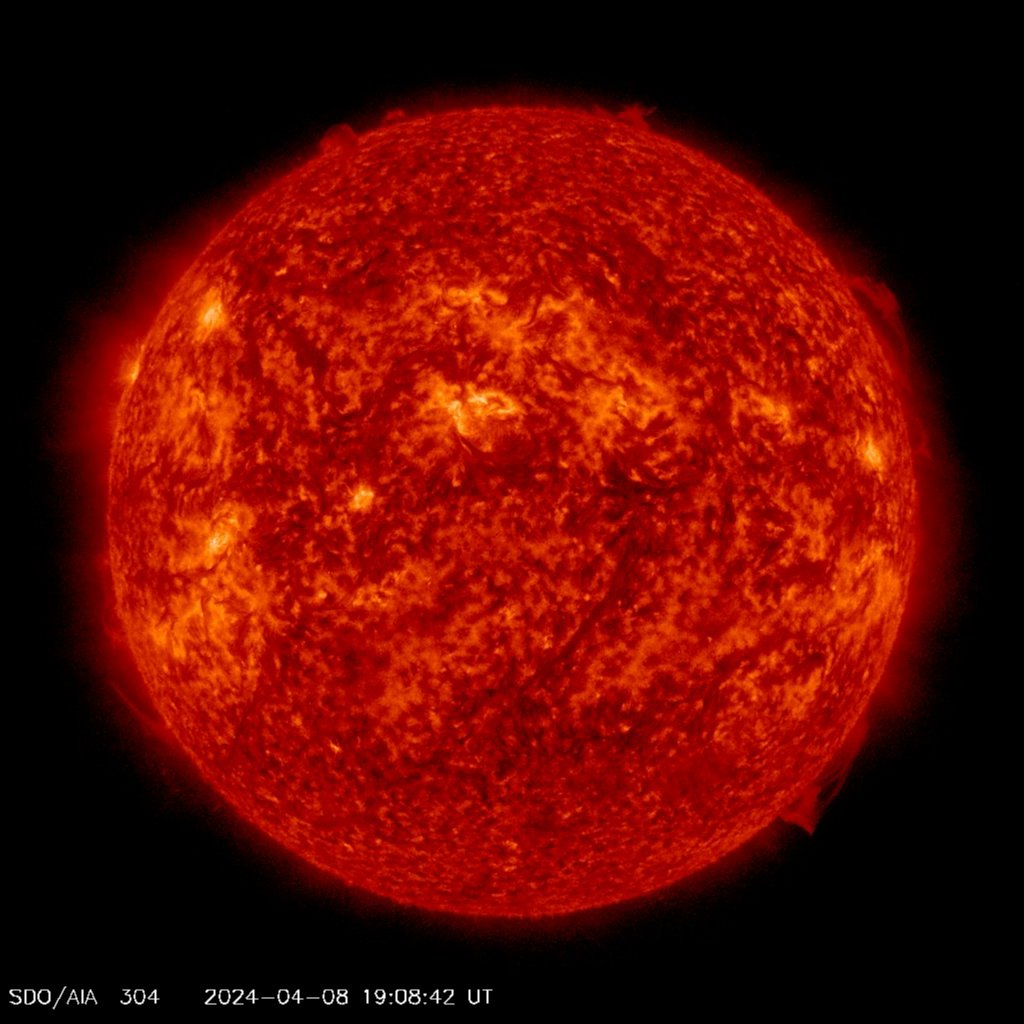
TOP: Solar prominences as seen from Third Connecticut Lake, New Hampshire – MIDDLE: Solar activity April 8, 2024, imaged by NASA Solar Dynamics Observatory AIA 304 telescope. Features seen here on the edge of the solar disk correspond to the prominences seen by earthbound observers during the eclipse totality. The large, bright, tent-shaped prominence reported by eclipse gazers appears here as detailed filaments around the 4:30 o'clock position. – BOTTOM: National Solar Observatory GONG telescope movie of solar activity in H-Alpha for the day of the April 8, 2024, eclipse, showing how prominences hardly changed during the eclipse.

The magnitude of an eclipse, or the ratio of the angular diameter of the Moon to the angular diameter of the Sun, must be one or greater for a total eclipse to occur. The Moon was near perigee (the closest point in its orbit to Earth) during this eclipse. Occurring only about 24 hours after perigee (on April 7, 2024, at 18:50 UTC), the Moon's apparent diameter was larger. The Sun had an angular diameter of 31'56" at the moment of greatest eclipse. As the magnitude of this eclipse at that time was 1.0566, the angular diameter of the Moon was 1.0566 times that of the Sun, or 33'44". This gave the eclipse a wider path of totality and more maximum time in totality (4 min 28 s) compared to the total eclipse in 2017 (2 min 40 s), which had a magnitude of 1.0306.

=== Solar prominences ===
The eclipse occurred around the solar maximum, a period of greatest solar activity in the Sun's 11-year solar cycle, and it was anticipated that solar prominences would be visible during totality. Many observers reported seeing solar prominences during the event. Most plainly visible to the naked eye was a very bright red point of light near the lowest portion of the Sun's disk, which on telescopic views and photographs showed as a tent-shaped angular structure. The red and pink hues were the result of hydrogen and helium plasma being thrown up in broad arcs but never leaving the sun's atmosphere. Telescopic photographs revealed the western limb having several smaller, irregular shapes, of which one large, ragged shape appeared disconnected from the Sun's surface on one side. Several smaller prominences were also visible on the eastern limb, though because of the eclipse's relatively high magnitude, prominences on both limbs could not be viewed at the same time. These shapes correlate in detail with the NASA Solar Dynamics Observatory solar telescope images taken in space at the same as the earthbound eclipse, and with images from the ground-based National Solar Observatory GONG telescope in Cerro Tololo, Chile.

=== Shadow bands ===
The shadow bands phenomenon was observed and documented in some locations with clear skies. Attempts to observe and record shadow bands on the ground were disappointed in many areas of totality by the phenomenon not appearing in the event, perhaps having been washed out by the diffuse illumination of cloudy skies in various locations.

== Impact ==
=== Economy and tourism ===
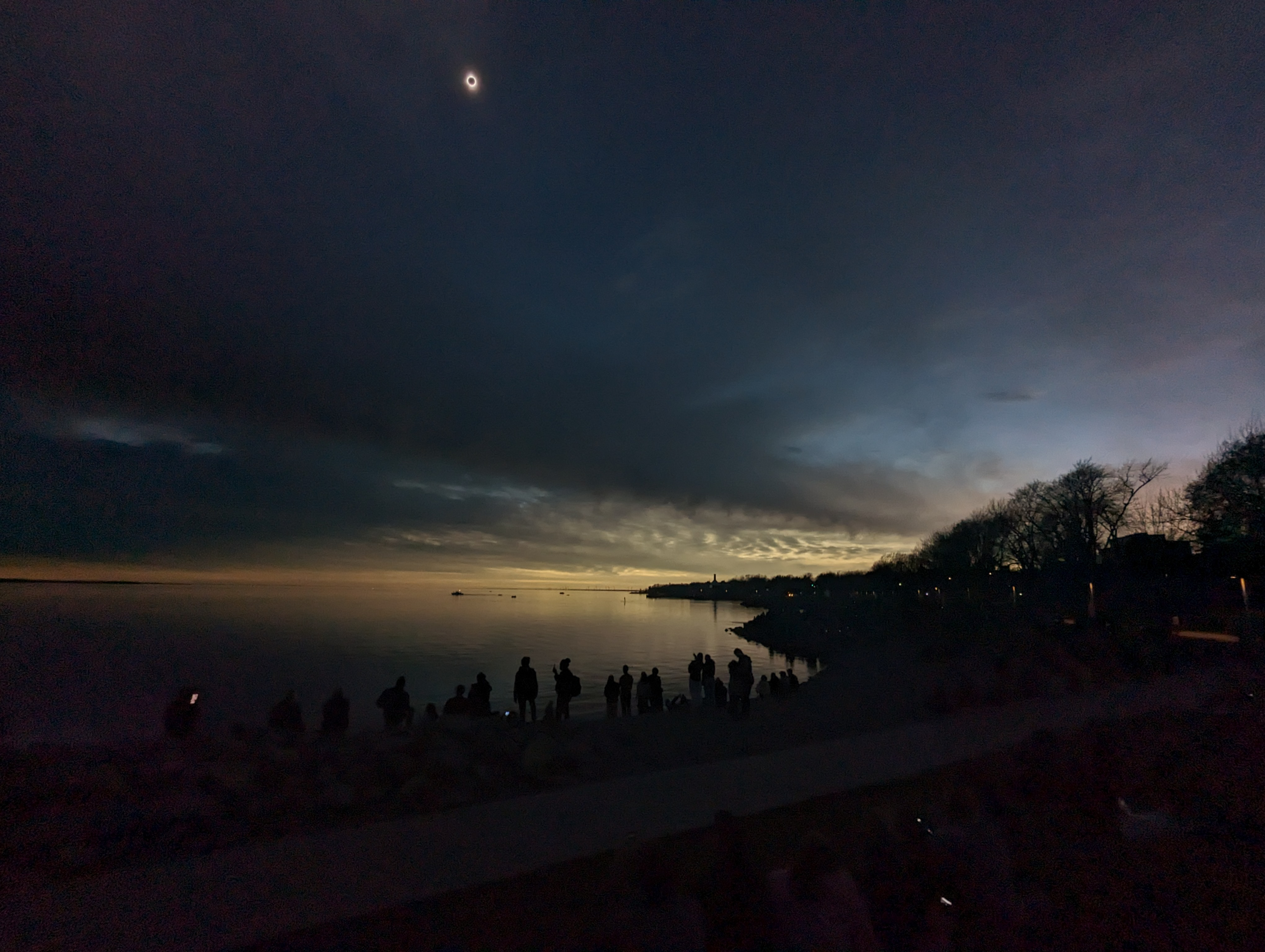
Crowd of eclipse viewers during totality over Kingston, Ontario

It was projected before the eclipse that there could be a $6 billion boost to the US economy due to the eclipse. The Mayor of Rochester, New York, Malik Evans, told reporters that the city was expected to bring in between $10–12 million to the city's economy from the Friday before the eclipse to the day of it. However, the day was cloudy. On April 12, New York Governor Kathy Hochul announced record breaking tourism numbers between April 6 and 9, which was a 45% increase compared to 2023, with nearly one million visitors to New York State parks and over 5.5 million toll transactions recorded.

One company that tracks Airbnb data likened the economic impact of the event to having Taylor Swift's concerts taking place simultaneously in every city along the eclipse's path. In the United States, the prices of motels and hotels near the path of totality increased up to 100 percent on April 7 and 8. Montreal saw a 20% surge in hotel occupancy for April 7 and 8. An estimated 20 million people travelled to the path of totality within the United States for the total solar eclipse, exceeding the estimated numbers for the August 2017 solar eclipse 7 years earlier by four times.

The eclipse caused a drop in solar power generation, with Texas experiencing a decrease from 12,000 MW to just over 3,000 MW at 2 p.m. Wind power generation also decreased by about 50% that day. However, there were no disruptions in power distribution as supply exceeded demand.

At Yankee Stadium, the Yankees gave away eclipse T-shirts to the first 15,000 fans at the game that day. The eclipse had pushed the start time back by four hours.

=== Traffic ===
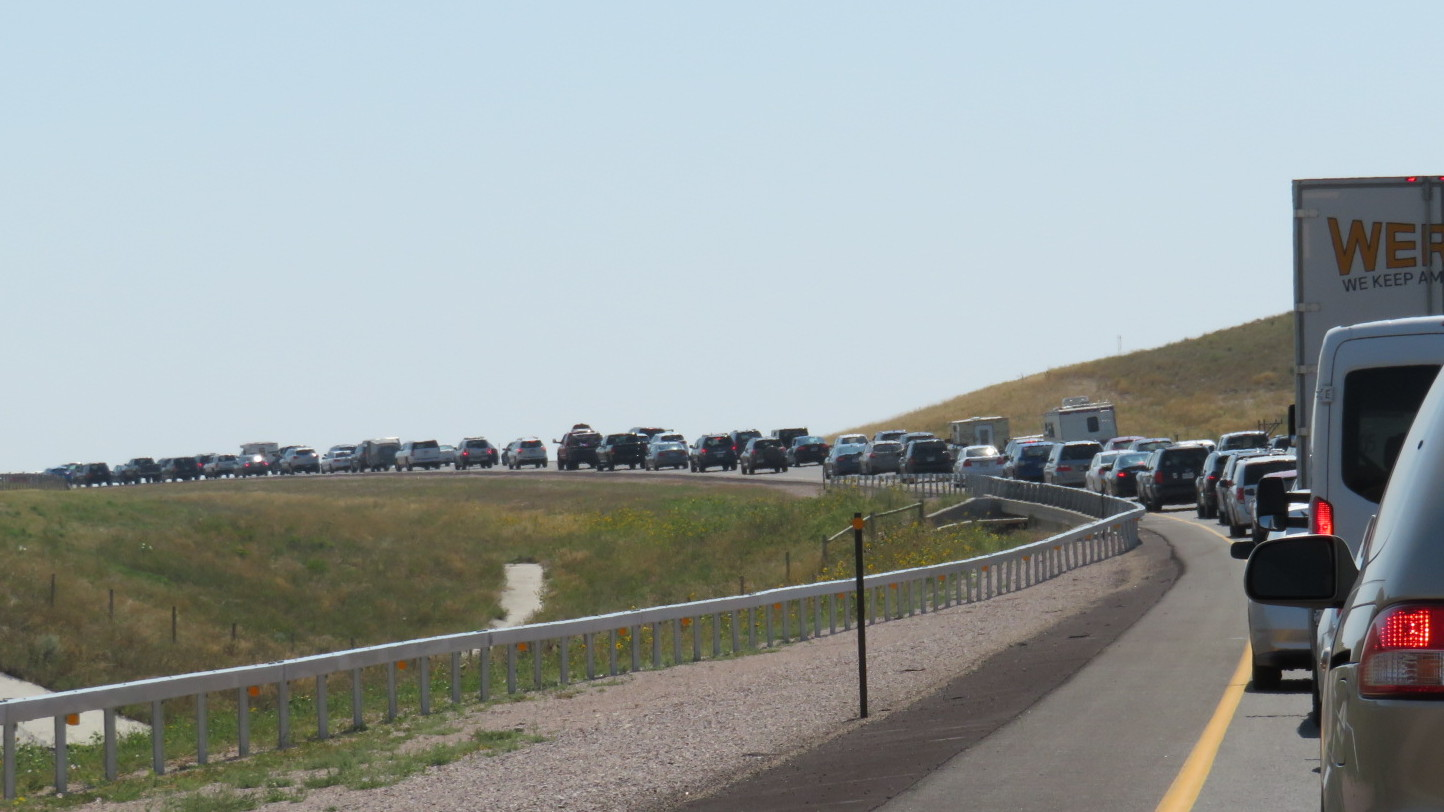
Post-eclipse traffic in Wyoming after the solar eclipse of August 21, 2017. Traffic planners learned from the 2017 eclipse, and efforts based on this experience might have helped ease congestion in some areas, while others experienced severe and prolonged traffic jams.

Prior to the solar eclipse, US officials expected the April 2024 solar eclipse to be the largest travel event in the US in years, with up to 4 million travelers expected. Some likened the projected tourism surge to "50 Super Bowls happening all at once". At least 5 million Americans had travelled to see the August 2017 solar eclipse, and based on the mass traffic jams that had ensued following the eclipse, transportation agencies prepared for a potentially even bigger traffic problem, in the wake of the April 2024 solar eclipse. Highways in the area of totality saw significant increases in traffic, with departing tourists caught in traffic jams lasting up to eight hours. Many of those trying to drive down Interstate 93 in New Hampshire, for example, found themselves in jams lasting until at least 2 a.m. the following morning, resulting in numerous cars breaking down. Drivers and passengers spent four to six hours to pass through Franconia Notch where Interstate 93 is reduced to a single lane in each direction. Major highways in the state remained crowded through rush hour the following morning and into the afternoon. A similar effect was seen during the following morning's rush hour in northbound Interstate 65 in Indianapolis. In Vermont there were an estimated 60,000 additional cars and 248 inbound aircraft over the span of the eclipse weekend, with about 160,000 visitors coming into the state per Secretary of Transportation Joe Flynn. Drivers in southern Illinois leaving the region of totality to the north toward St. Louis, Missouri faced more than 80 miles of stop-and-go heavy congestion. Unlike other regions, traffic was lighter in Texas than the state's Department of Transportation had anticipated.

=== Animal behavior ===
Zookeepers, naturalists, university researchers, and citizen scientists positioned themselves to observe animal behavior during the eclipse, some with the goal of comparing results with observations made during the 1932 and 2017 total solar eclipses, and others opening new avenues of animal behavioral research. Wildlife and zoo animals were observed along the path of totality and in areas that saw only a partial eclipse. NASA worked with ARISA Lab, LLC, to recruit thousands of citizen scientists to help record sounds and observations of animal behavior during the eclipse. As of 16 April 2024, a total of 3,372 written observations had been submitted by citizen scientists, and 770 recording devices had been registered with the project to provide sound and ultrasound recordings of wildlife and other ambient sounds before, during, and after the eclipse in a standardized way.

==== Wildlife ====
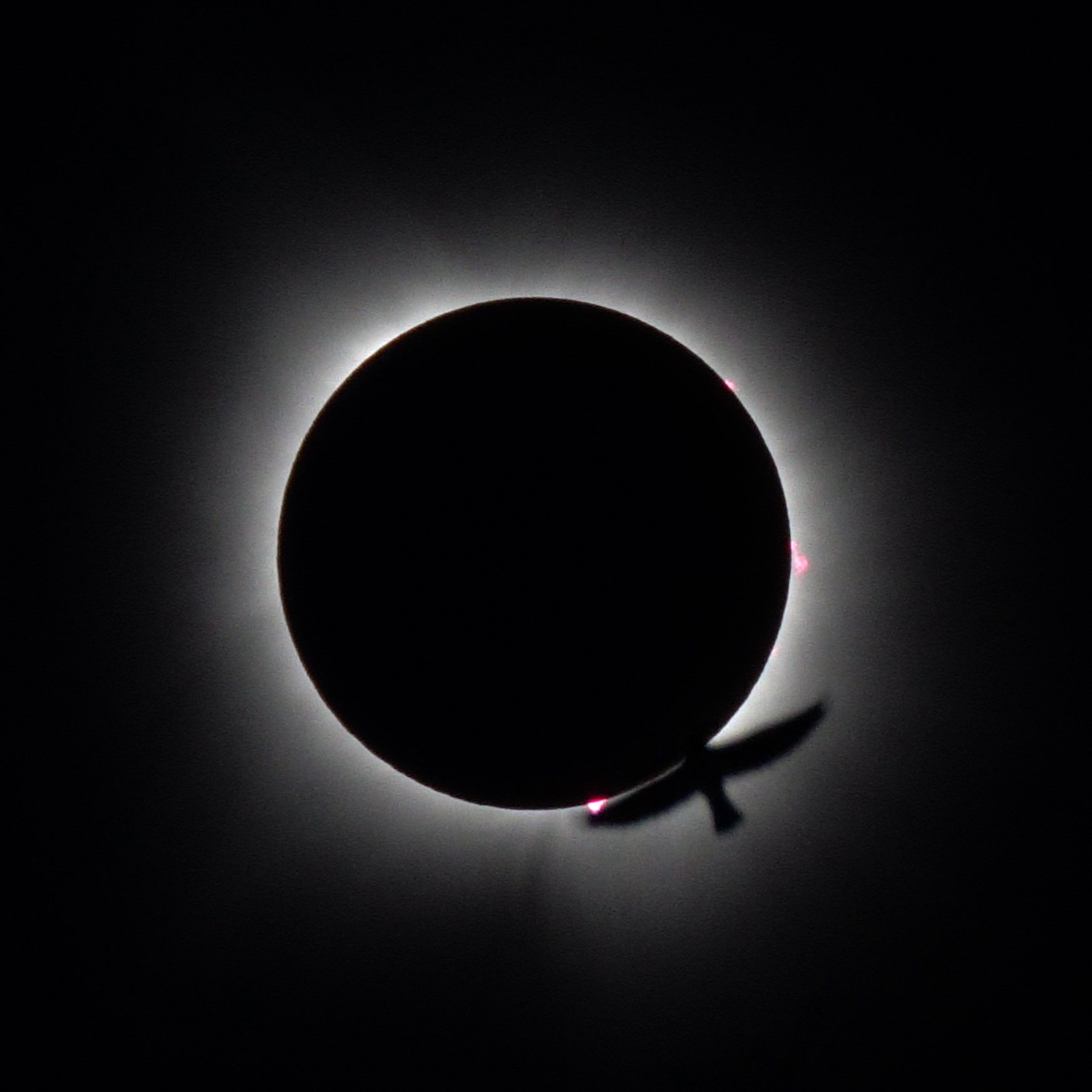
Wildlife sometimes act in unusual ways during a total solar eclipse. This Cooper's hawk took flight during totality of the April 8, 2024, total solar eclipse at Kinkaid Lake in the Shawnee National Forest in Illinois.

Changes in wild animal behavior were recorded during the eclipse, especially among birds. These changes were similar to those observed during the 2017 eclipse, but more pronounced. Weather radar was adapted to monitor the activity of flying animals, and birds were observed to decrease their daytime activities. Radar imaging demonstrated "noticeable decreases in typical daytime biological activities such as the movements of hawks and other soaring and insect-eating birds." Owls began hooting, and vultures and other birds began to roost. A team from Purdue University, observing a variety of ecosystems on wild-lands maintained by the university near Butlerville, Indiana, recorded the songs of 20 different species of birds going quiet, leaving only the songs of the robin and the tufted titmouse during the eclipse. Birding students at the University of Vermont observed species at Lake Champlain during the eclipse that had not been observed there before, including Bohemian waxwings, red-tailed hawks, and pileated woodpeckers.

Haikubox community science data from hundreds of locations found that at locations experiencing more than 99 percent obscurity, and in the absence of human vocalizations, birds generally stopped vocalizing, but that there was variability between locations and individual species responses.

Insects and frogs in the wild were also observed making their nighttime sounds. Cicadas in Arizona stopped singing when the Sun was 50% blocked during their partial eclipse. Spring peepers, a type of nocturnal frog, were heard intermittently by the Purdue team in rural Indiana while the eclipse was partial, but they abruptly filled the soundscape at the moment of totality. Wild cricket frogs were observed in Fort Worth, Texas, behaving similarly.

==== Zoo animals ====
At the Columbus Zoo and Aquarium, ostriches returned to their barn and began their evening rituals, such as preening and grooming each other. When the sunlight returned, the ostriches left their barn and resumed their daytime activities. A group of elephants at the zoo gathered together and began thumping their trunks on the ground. At the Fort Worth Zoo in Texas, flamingos bunched together, vocalized, and began marching together, which is a bonding behavior. A troop of gorillas at that zoo also gathered at the door to their indoor enclosure, where they were normally fed each evening, and appeared to act confused and frustrated, as if having missed their evening meal. The Fort Worth Botanic Garden (FWBG) placed hundreds of butterflies in their conservatory March 1, allowed them to acclimate, and observed them during the eclipse. The butterflies "didn't roost but instead ceased flying and remained very still." Goats at the FWBC were observed resting or sleeping during the eclipse. Giraffes at the Dallas Zoo also began to gallop, a behavior witnessed there and at many other zoos during the 2017 eclipse. Two aldabra tortoises at the same zoo were observed to rear on their hind legs and attack the door to their indoor enclosure, damaging the door's frame. Lions at the Buffalo Zoo started roaring just before totality.

Not all zoo animals reacted to the eclipse, nor did researchers expect them to. During the 2017 eclipse, researchers at the Riverbanks Zoo in South Carolina observed behavior changes in about 75% of species. Adam Hartstone-Rose, a biology professor at North Carolina State University, hypothesized that the captive animals that did react may have been responding to the emotions of human zoo visitors. Zoologists and volunteers at Parc Safari, a zoo in Hemmingford, Quebec, noted very little change in the animals they observed there, including giraffes, lions, hyenas, wolves, lynx, llamas, alpacas, and dromedaries. Hyenas vocalized during the eclipse, but there were other coinciding events that might have contributed to that behavior. The zoo's director of zoology, Aurélien Berthelot, did not expect much activity from their mammals. For example, lions sleep up to eighteen hours per day. Some roared during the eclipse while others slept. Analyses of their observations are continuing.

=== Human behavior ===
Some people acted irrationally, with conspiracy theories spreading online about the rapture occurring during the event. In Los Angeles, Danielle Johnson killed her infant when she threw her children off a balcony. She was referring to the eclipse as "the epitome of spiritual warfare" and an "apocalypse" on her Twitter account before the incident. Others used it as cultural commentary, such as Donald Trump, at the time running his second successful campaign for U.S. president, posted a video to his Truth Social account depicting his head as the Moon blocking out the Sun with the phrases "The most important moment in human history is taking place in 2024" and "We will save America. And make it great again" being seen in the video.

Scientific study has not proven a direct link between solar eclipses and human mental health, along with sometimes grandiose ideologies that some people can harbor during natural spectacles.

== Responses ==
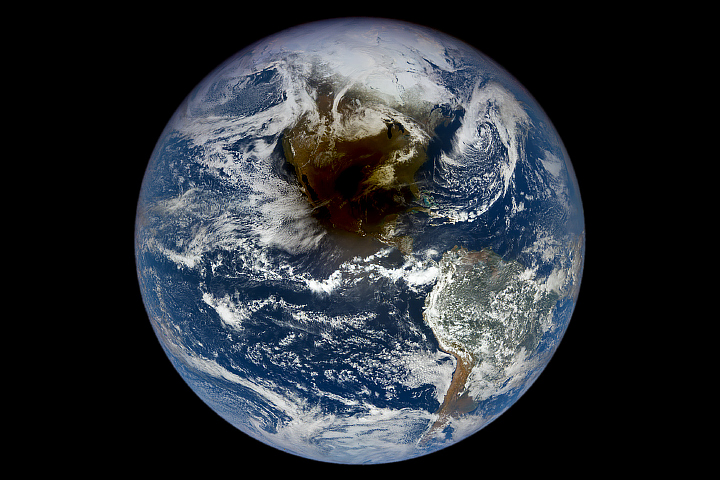
NASA's Earth Polychromatic Imaging Camera's satellite image of the solar eclipse over North America

Arkansas Governor Sarah Huckabee Sanders preemptively declared a state of emergency related to the eclipse, citing the expected increase of travel to the state which could result in transportation difficulties, such as in Fort Smith, where the police prepared for traffic congestion as hotels filled up. Bell County, Texas Judge David Blackburn preemptively declared a state of emergency in February 2024 due to the projected number of visitors to the area. The region surrounding Niagara Falls, Ontario, also declared a state of emergency; as an existing major tourist destination along the path of totality, it expected an influx of at least one million visitors on April 8.

A lawsuit was filed on April 2 by six inmates of various religions at Woodbourne Correctional Facility in New York against the state, stating that the decision to lock down the prison during the eclipse conflicted with their religious beliefs. The solar eclipse is important in various religions. The state settled the lawsuit by allowing the six inmates to view the eclipse.

== Eclipse details ==
Shown below are two tables displaying details about this particular solar eclipse. The first table outlines times at which the Moon's penumbra or umbra attains the specific parameter, and the second table describes various other parameters pertaining to this eclipse.

April 8, 2024, Solar Eclipse Times
Event	Time (UTC)
First Penumbral External Contact	2024 April 8 at 15:43:23.3 UTC
First Umbral External Contact	2024 April 8 at 16:40:00.7 UTC
First Central Line	2024 April 8 at 16:41:09.4 UTC
First Umbral Internal Contact	2024 April 8 at 16:42:18.1 UTC
First Penumbral Internal Contact	2024 April 8 at 17:46:09.2 UTC
Greatest Eclipse	2024 April 8 at 18:18:29.4 UTC
Greatest Duration	2024 April 8 at 18:20:44.2 UTC
Ecliptic Conjunction	2024 April 8 at 18:22:00.8 UTC
Equatorial Conjunction	2024 April 8 at 18:37:18.9 UTC
Last Penumbral Internal Contact	2024 April 8 at 18:50:23.9 UTC
Last Umbral Internal Contact	2024 April 8 at 19:54:30.4 UTC
Last Central Line	2024 April 8 at 19:55:38.1 UTC
Last Umbral External Contact	2024 April 8 at 19:56:45.7 UTC
Last Penumbral External Contact	2024 April 8 at 20:53:30.4 UTC

April 8, 2024, Solar Eclipse Parameters
Parameter	Value
Eclipse Magnitude	1.05656
Eclipse Obscuration	1.11631
Gamma	0.34314
Sun Right Ascension	01h11m36.9s
Sun Declination	+07°35'29.4"
Sun Semi-Diameter	15'58.2"
Sun Equatorial Horizontal Parallax	08.8"
Moon Right Ascension	01h10m57.5s
Moon Declination	+07°53'55.5"
Moon Semi-Diameter	16'36.3"
Moon Equatorial Horizontal Parallax	1°00'56.6"
ΔT	71.5 s

== Eclipse season ==
This eclipse is part of an eclipse season, a period, roughly every six months, when eclipses occur. Only two (or occasionally three) eclipse seasons occur each year, and each season lasts about 35 days and repeats just short of six months (173 days) later; thus two full eclipse seasons always occur each year. Either two or three eclipses happen each eclipse season. In the sequence below, each eclipse is separated by a fortnight.

Eclipse season of March–April 2024
March 25 Descending node (full moon)	April 8 Ascending node (new moon)
Penumbral lunar eclipse Lunar Saros 113	Total solar eclipse Solar Saros 139

== Related eclipses ==
=== Eclipses in 2024 ===
- A penumbral lunar eclipse on March 25.
- A total solar eclipse on April 8.
- A partial lunar eclipse on September 18.
- An annular solar eclipse on October 2.

=== Metonic ===
- Preceded by: Solar eclipse of June 21, 2020
- Followed by: Solar eclipse of January 26, 2028

=== Tzolkinex ===
- Preceded by: Solar eclipse of February 26, 2017
- Followed by: Solar eclipse of May 21, 2031

=== Half-Saros ===
- Preceded by: Lunar eclipse of April 4, 2015
- Followed by: Lunar eclipse of April 14, 2033

=== Tritos ===
- Preceded by: Solar eclipse of May 10, 2013
- Followed by: Solar eclipse of March 9, 2035

=== Solar Saros 139 ===
- Preceded by: Solar eclipse of March 29, 2006
- Followed by: Solar eclipse of April 20, 2042

=== Inex ===
- Preceded by: Solar eclipse of April 29, 1995
- Followed by: Solar eclipse of March 20, 2053

=== Triad ===
- Preceded by: Solar eclipse of June 8, 1937
- Followed by: Solar eclipse of February 8, 2111

=== Solar eclipses of 2022–2025 ===
Solar eclipse series sets from 2022 to 2025
Ascending node			Descending node		
Saros	Map	Gamma	Saros	Map	Gamma
119 Partial in CTIO, Chile	April 30, 2022 Partial	−1.19008	124 Partial from Saratov, Russia	October 25, 2022 Partial	1.07014
129 Totality from Exmouth, WA	April 20, 2023 Hybrid	−0.39515	134 Mexican Hat, UT	October 14, 2023 Annular	0.37534
139 Totality in Dallas, TX	April 8, 2024 Total	0.34314	144 Tres Cerros, Argentina	October 2, 2024 Annular	−0.35087
149 Partial from Halifax, NS	March 29, 2025 Partial	1.04053	154	September 21, 2025 Partial	−1.06509

=== Saros 139 ===
This eclipse is a part of Saros series 139, repeating every 18 years, 11 days, and containing 71 events. The series started with a partial solar eclipse on May 17, 1501. It contains hybrid eclipses from August 11, 1627 through December 9, 1825 and total eclipses from December 21, 1843 through March 26, 2601. There are no annular eclipses in this set. The series ends at member 71 as a partial eclipse on July 3, 2763. Its eclipses are tabulated in three columns; every third eclipse in the same column is one exeligmos apart, so they all cast shadows over approximately the same parts of the Earth.

The longest duration of totality will be produced by member 61 at 7 minutes, 29.22 seconds on July 16, 2186. This date is the longest solar eclipse computed between 4000 BC and AD 6000. All eclipses in this series occur at the Moon’s ascending node of orbit.

Series members 18–39 occur between 1801 and 2200:
18	19	20
November 29, 1807	December 9, 1825	December 21, 1843
21	22	23
December 31, 1861	January 11, 1880	January 22, 1898
24	25	26
February 3, 1916	February 14, 1934	February 25, 1952
27	28	29
March 7, 1970	March 18, 1988	March 29, 2006
30	31	32
April 8, 2024	April 20, 2042	April 30, 2060
33	34	35
May 11, 2078	May 22, 2096	June 3, 2114
36	37	38
June 13, 2132	June 25, 2150	July 5, 2168
39
July 16, 2186

=== Metonic series ===
The metonic series repeats eclipses every 19 years (6939.69 days), lasting about 5 cycles. Eclipses occur in nearly the same calendar date. In addition, the octon subseries repeats 1/5 of that or every 3.8 years (1387.94 days). All eclipses in this table occur at the Moon's ascending node.

21 eclipse events between June 21, 1982 and June 21, 2058
June 21	April 8–9	January 26	November 13–14	September 1–2
117	119	121	123	125
June 21, 1982	April 9, 1986	January 26, 1990	November 13, 1993	September 2, 1997
127	129	131	133	135
June 21, 2001	April 8, 2005	January 26, 2009	November 13, 2012	September 1, 2016
137	139	141	143	145
June 21, 2020	April 8, 2024	January 26, 2028	November 14, 2031	September 2, 2035
147	149	151	153	155
June 21, 2039	April 9, 2043	January 26, 2047	November 14, 2050	September 2, 2054
157
June 21, 2058

=== Tritos series ===
This eclipse is a part of a tritos cycle, repeating at alternating nodes every 135 synodic months (≈ 3986.63 days, or 11 years minus 1 month). Their appearance and longitude are irregular due to a lack of synchronization with the anomalistic month (period of perigee), but groupings of 3 tritos cycles (≈ 33 years minus 3 months) come close (≈ 434.044 anomalistic months), so eclipses are similar in these groupings.

Series members between 1801 and 2200
December 21, 1805 (Saros 119)	November 19, 1816 (Saros 120)	October 20, 1827 (Saros 121)	September 18, 1838 (Saros 122)	August 18, 1849 (Saros 123)
July 18, 1860 (Saros 124)	June 18, 1871 (Saros 125)	May 17, 1882 (Saros 126)	April 16, 1893 (Saros 127)	March 17, 1904 (Saros 128)
February 14, 1915 (Saros 129)	January 14, 1926 (Saros 130)	December 13, 1936 (Saros 131)	November 12, 1947 (Saros 132)	October 12, 1958 (Saros 133)
September 11, 1969 (Saros 134)	August 10, 1980 (Saros 135)	July 11, 1991 (Saros 136)	June 10, 2002 (Saros 137)	May 10, 2013 (Saros 138)
April 8, 2024 (Saros 139)	March 9, 2035 (Saros 140)	February 5, 2046 (Saros 141)	January 5, 2057 (Saros 142)	December 6, 2067 (Saros 143)
November 4, 2078 (Saros 144)	October 4, 2089 (Saros 145)	September 4, 2100 (Saros 146)	August 4, 2111 (Saros 147)	July 4, 2122 (Saros 148)
June 3, 2133 (Saros 149)	May 3, 2144 (Saros 150)	April 2, 2155 (Saros 151)	March 2, 2166 (Saros 152)	January 29, 2177 (Saros 153)
December 29, 2187 (Saros 154)	November 28, 2198 (Saros 155)			

=== Inex series ===
This eclipse is a part of the long period inex cycle, repeating at alternating nodes, every 358 synodic months (≈ 10,571.95 days, or 29 years minus 20 days). Their appearance and longitude are irregular due to a lack of synchronization with the anomalistic month (period of perigee). However, groupings of 3 inex cycles (≈ 87 years minus 2 months) comes close (≈ 1,151.02 anomalistic months), so eclipses are similar in these groupings.

Series members between 1801 and 2200
August 27, 1821 (Saros 132)	August 7, 1850 (Saros 133)	July 19, 1879 (Saros 134)
June 28, 1908 (Saros 135)	June 8, 1937 (Saros 136)	May 20, 1966 (Saros 137)
April 29, 1995 (Saros 138)	April 8, 2024 (Saros 139)	March 20, 2053 (Saros 140)
February 27, 2082 (Saros 141)	February 8, 2111 (Saros 142)	January 20, 2140 (Saros 143)
December 29, 2168 (Saros 144)	December 9, 2197 (Saros 145)	

== See also ==
- List of solar eclipses in the 21st century
- List of solar eclipses visible from the United States
- Solar eclipse of June 24, 1778
- Solar eclipse of June 16, 1806
- Solar eclipse of May 28, 1900
- Solar eclipse of March 7, 1970
