= Bailey (given name) =

Unisex given name

- Pronunciation: /ˈbeɪli/
- Gender: Unisex
- Language: English

Other gender
- Feminine: Bailee and Baylee

Origin
- Language: Anglo-Norman
- Origin: Bailey (surname)
- Meaning: Bailiff (occupational surname)
- Region of origin: England

Other names
- Variant forms: Bayley; Bailie; Baily; Bayly; Bailee; Baylee; Baileigh

Bailey is a given name derived from the surname Bailey. The most likely derivation of the surname is from bailli, the Anglo-Norman equivalent of bailiff.

An early American bearer of the given name was Bailey Bartlett (1750–1830). Occasional use of Bailey as a given name in the United States is recorded throughout the 19th century, but it mostly fell out of use by the 1940s. In the 1980s, it saw a resurgence of popularity as a feminine name beginning in the 1980s, popularized by the female character Bailey Quarters in the American comedy television sitcom WKRP in Cincinnati (1978–1982), played by Jan Smithers. In the 1990s to 2000s, there was also a resurgence in use as a masculine name.

Following the US fashion, the name came to be used in other English-speaking countries beginning in the 1990s. In England, it ranked among the top 200 masculine names in the 1990s. Bailey was the 70th most popular name for boys born in England and Wales and Ireland in 2007 and was the 91st most popular name for boys born in Scotland in 2006. Spelling variations of the name are also in wide use.

== Notable people with the given name ==
=== Masculine ===
- Bailey Akehurst (born 2003), English professional footballer
- Bailey Aldrich (1907–2002), American judge and lawyer
- Bailey Ashford (1873–1934), American physician and army soldier
- Bailey Banfield (born 1998), Australian professional rules footballer
- Bailey Bartlett (1750–1830), American politician
- Bailey Barton Burritt (1878–1954), American public health- and social welfare advocate and physician
- Bailey Biondi-Odo (born 2001), Australian professional rugby league footballer
- Bailey Brown (1917–2004), American judge and navy officer
- Bailey Capel (born 2000), Australian cricketer
- Bailey Chase (born 1972), American stage and television actor
- Bailey Clements (born 2000), English footballer
- Bailey Dale (born 1996), Australian rules footballer
- Bailey Davies (1884–1968), Welsh rugby union fullback
- Bailey Falter (born 1997), American baseball player
- Bailey Farquharson, Australian murder victim
- Bailey Feltmate (born 1998), Canadian professional football player
- Bailey Gaither (born 1997), American football player
- Bailey Gatzert (1829–1893), American politician
- Bailey Hardeman (1795–1836), American first Secretary of the Treasury for the Republic of Texas
- Bailey Hayward (born 1996), Scottish international rugby league footballer
- Bailey Hodgson (born 2002), English professional rugby league footballer
- Bailey Howell (born 1937), American NBA player
- Bailey Jacobson, American orthodontist
- Bailey Johnson, several people
- Bailey Junior Kurariki (born 1989), New Zealand criminal
- Bailey May (born 2002), Filipino-British actor, model, singer, dancer, and television personality
- Bailey Ober (born 1995), American MLB pitcher
- Bailey Olter (1932–1999), Micronesian politician
- Bailey Patrick, English television- and film actor
- Bailey Peacock-Farrell (born 1996), English footballer
- Bailey Rice (born 1997), Australian-born American college football punter and former Australian rules footballer
- Bailey Rowe (born 2002), British Virgin Islands footballer
- Bailey Santistevan (1901–1954), American baseball coach
- Bailey Simonsson (born 1998), New Zealand Māori international rugby league footballer
- Bailey Smith (born 2000), Australian rules footballer
- Bailey Sugden (born 1997), British kickboxer
- Bailey T. Barco (1846–1901), American coast guard captain
- Bailey W. Diffie (1902–1983), American historian and teacher
- Bailey Walsh (1905–1962), American politician
- Bailey Washington (1731–1807), American planter and legislator
- Bailey Washington Jr. (1753–1814), American planter and legislator
- Bailey Wightman (born 1999), English-born Australian cricketer
- Bailey Williams, several people
- Bailey Willis (1857–1949), American geological engineer
- Bailey Wollenweber (born 2001), German politician
- Bailey Wright (born 1992), Australian footballer
- Bailey Zappe (born 1999), American football player
- Bailey Zimmerman (born 2000), American country music artist

=== Feminine ===
- Bailey Aarons (born 1997), South African cricketer
- Bailey Andison (born 1997), Canadian competitive swimmer
- Bailey Boswell, one of Sydney Loofe's killers
- Bailey Bram (born 1990), Canadian ice hockey player
- Bailey Bryan (fl. 2016–present), American singer-songwriter
- Bailey De Young (born 1989), American actress and dancer
- Bailey Doogan (1941–2022), American artist
- Bailey Hanks (born 1988), American singer, actress, and dancer
- Bailey Hemphill (born 1998), American softball player
- Bailey Hunt (born 1996), Australian rules footballer
- Bailey Jay (born 1988), American actress, model, presenter, and podcaster
- Bailey Anne Kennedy, Cambodian-American beauty pageant winner
- Bailey Landry (born 1995), American softball player
- Bailey Mes (born 1989), Auckland-born New Zealand netball player
- Bailey Moody (born 2001), American wheelchair basketball player
- Bailey Noble (born 1990), American actress
- Bailey Ryon (born 2002), American actress
- Bailey Sarian (born 1988), American YouTuber, podcaster
- Bailey Sok (born 2004), American singer, professional dancer and choreographer, member of co-ed group Allday Project
- Bailey Tzuke (born 1987), English singer-songwriter
- Bailey Webster (born 1991), American volleyball player
- Bailey White (born 1950), American author and National Public Radio commentator

== Fictional characters ==
- Bailey Briggs, Marvel Comics character also known as Spider-Boy
- Bailey Pickett, on the American television series The Suite Life on Deck
- Bailey Quarters, on the American television series WKRP in Cincinnati
- Bailey Turner, on the Australian soap opera Neighbours
