= Brailey =

Brailey is a surname. Notable people with the surname include:

- Jayden Brailey (born 1996), Australian rugby league footballer
- Jerome Brailey (born 1950), American drummer
- Jimmy Brailey (1919–1981), Australian rugby league player
- Miriam Esther Brailey (1900–1976), American physician
- William Theodore Brailey, (1887–1912), English pianist on the RMS Titanic who died in the disaster
- Kenneth Brailey Cumberland (1913–2011), New Zealand geography academic

== See also ==
- Bailey (disambiguation)
- Baily (disambiguation)
- Baley (disambiguation)
- Brail
- Braley
- Braly (disambiguation)
- Briley (disambiguation)
