= Bailey =

(The) Bailey(s) may refer to:

== Arts and entertainment ==
- Bailey, a type of robot in the television series Cleopatra 2525
- Bailey, New Hampshire, a fictional town depicted in the comic book Mister Miracle
- The Baileys, an Australian band comprising Charlie Collins (née Bailey) and her siblings

== Constructions ==
- Bailey (castle), or ward, a courtyard of a castle or fortification, enclosed by a curtain wall
- Bailey bridge, a portable prefabricated truss bridge

== People and fictional characters ==
- Bailey (surname)
- Bailey (given name)

== Places ==
=== United States ===
- Bailey, Colorado, an unincorporated community
- Bailey, Minnesota, an unincorporated community
- Bailey, Mississippi, an unincorporated community
- Bailey, Missouri, an unincorporated community
- Bailey, North Carolina, a town
- Bailey, Oklahoma, a ghost town
- Bailey, Texas, a city
- Bailey Brook (West Branch French Creek tributary), Pennsylvania
- Bailey Park (disambiguation)
- Bailey Peninsula, Washington, site of Seward Park (Seattle)

=== Elsewhere ===
- The Bailey, an historic area in the centre of Durham, England
- Bailey Creek (disambiguation), several rivers (including the US)
- Bailey Peninsula, Wilkes Land, Antarctica
  - Bailey Rocks, on the north side of Bailey Peninsula
- Mount Bailey (disambiguation), several mountains (including the US)

== Other uses ==
- Bailey (dog), Elizabeth Warren's dog
- Bailey, a sea area in the BBC Shipping Forecast
- Bailey Aviation, a British aircraft manufacturer
- Bailey Distinguished Member Award, the highest honor of The Clay Minerals Society
- Bailey Road, Patna, India
- Bailey Sweet (apple), also referred to as Bailey, a cultivar of the domesticated apple
- Baileys Irish Cream, a type of alcoholic liqueur commonly known as Baileys
- Baileys Women's Prize for Fiction, now known as the Women's Prize for Fiction

== See also ==
- Old Bailey, nickname of the Central Criminal Court in London, England
- Bailey House (disambiguation)
- Bailey Limestone, a geologic formation in Indiana, US
- BAILII, British and Irish Legal Information Institute
- Baily (disambiguation)
- Baley (disambiguation)
- Bayley (disambiguation)
- Bəyli, village in the Qabala Rayon of Azerbaijan.
- Bayli (singer), American singer
