= Bayley (surname) =

Bayley is an English surname. Notable people with the surname include:

- Anne Bayley (1934–2024), English oncologist and HIV/AIDS researcher
- Arthur Wellesley Bayley (1865–1896), Australian gold prospector
- Barrington J. Bayley (1937–2008), English science fiction writer
- Blaze Bayley (born 1963), English singer, lyricist, and songwriter
- Bryan Bayley, New Zealand cricketer
- Dave Bayley, musician and lyricist in the band Glass Animals
- Elizabeth Ann Seton, born Elizabeth Ann Bayley
- Harold Bayley, Guyanese cricketer
- Hugh Bayley (born 1952), British Labour Party politician
- James Roosevelt Bayley (1814–1877), American prelate of the Catholic Church
- John Bayley (disambiguation), various people
- Matheson Bayley (born 1978), British pianist, composer, orchestrator, singer and television host
- Peter Bayley (disambiguation), several people
- Robert Bayley (c. 1800–1859), English independent minister
- Ryan Bayley (born 1982), Australian professional track cyclist and double Olympic gold medallist
- Sam Bayley, English footballer
- Stephen Bayley (born 1951), British design critic, cultural critic, journalist and author
- Warner B. Bayley (1845–1928), United States Navy rear admiral
- Will Bayley (born 1988), British Paralympic table tennis player
- William Bayley (1879–1955), Canadian politician
- William Butterworth Bayley (1782–1860), British Governor-General of India

== See also ==
- Bayley (wrestler) (born 1989), ring name of professional wrestler Pamela Martinez
- Bayley (disambiguation)
- Bailey (surname)
- Bayly (surname)
