= Bailly =

Bailly may refer to:

== People ==
- Alexis Bailly (1798–1860), American politician and fur trader
- Alice Bailly (1872–1938), Swiss painter
- Anatole Bailly (1833–1911), French Hellenist
- Auguste Bailly (1878–1967), French historian and novelist
- Benjamin Bailly (born 1990), Belgian racing driver
- Blanche Bailly (born 1995), Cameroonian singer
- Colette Bailly (1928–1976), French pianist and composer
- David Bailly (1584–1657), Dutch Golden Age painter
- Dominique Bailly (born 1960), French politician
- Earl Bailly (1903–1977), Canadian painter
- Edmond Bailly (1850–1916), French librarian and publisher
- Edmond Bailly (footballer) (fl. 1928), Swiss footballer
- Eric Bailly (born 1994), Ivorian footballer
- Ernest Joseph Bailly (1753–1823), Flemish painter
- François Bailly (c. 1630–1690), French mason and architect in Canada
- Gérard Bailly (born 1940), French politician
- Guillaume Bailly (died 1696), French Sulpician missionary to Canada
- Henri de Bailly (died 1637), French composer
- Henry G. Bailly (1828-1865), American politician and businessman
- Jacques Bailly (born 1966), Scripps National Spelling Bee's official pronouncer
- Jean-Baptiste Bailly (1822–1880), French ornithologist
- Jean-Christophe Bailly (born 1949), French writer
- Jean Sylvain Bailly (1736–1793), French astronomer and orator, one of the leaders of the early part of the French Revolution
- Joseph Bailly (1774–1835), French-Canadian fur trader and pioneer
- Joseph A. Bailly (1823 or 1825–1883), American sculptor
- Logan Bailly (born 1985), Belgian football goalkeeper
- Louis Bailly (1882–1974), French-Canadian violist
- Mary Cecilia Bailly (1815-1898), American nun and general superior of the Sisters of Providence of Saint Mary-of-the-Woods, Indiana
- Martine Bailly (born 1946), French cellist
- Pierre Bailly (1889–1973), French architect
- Rosa Bailly (1890–1976), French teacher, journalist and writer
- Sandrine Bailly (born 1979), French biathlete
- Séry Bailly (1948–2018), Ivorian academic, politician, and writer
- Simon Bailly (fl. 1416), English politician
- Thomas Bailly (fl. 1397), English politician

== Places ==
=== Canada ===
- Bailly Lake (Saint-Cyr River South), Quebec

=== France ===
- Bailly, Oise
- Bailly, Yvelines
- Bailly-aux-Forges, Haute-Marne
- Bailly-en-Rivière, Seine-Maritime
- Bailly-le-Franc, Aube
- Bailly-Romainvilliers, Seine-et-Marne
- Baily, in the commune of Saint-Bris-le-Vineux, Yonne

== Other uses ==
- Bailly (crater), a lunar crater
- Bailly Generating Station, in Indiana
- Bailiff

== See also ==
- Baily (disambiguation)
- Bailey (disambiguation)
