= Vivian Johnson =

Vivian Johnson (or variants) may refer to:

- Vivien Johnson, Australian sociologist
- Vivian Annabelle Johnson, Purdue University physicist
- Vivienne Johnson, British actress best known for her role in Are You Being Served?
- Vivian Baxter Johnson, mother of Maya Angelou and a character in her autobiographical works
- Vivian Johnson (Without a Trace), a fictional character in the television series Without a Trace
