= Bailey Branch =

Bailey Branch may refer to:

- Bailey Branch (Barren Fork tributary), a stream in Miller County, Missouri, United States
- Bailey Branch (Camp Creek tributary), a stream in Lincoln County, Missouri, United States
- Bailey Branch (Courtois Creek tributary), a stream in Washington County, Missouri, United States
