= Francis Baily =

English astronomer (1774–1844)

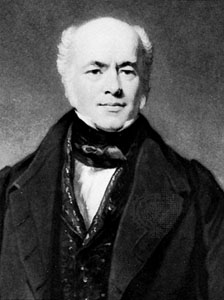
- Royal Astronomical Society portrait
- Born: 28 April 1774; Newbury, Berkshire, England
- Died: 30 August 1844 (aged 70); London, England
- Resting place: St Mary's Church in Thatcham
- Known for: Baily's beads President of the Royal Astronomical Society
- Awards: Gold Medal of the Royal Astronomical Society (1827 & 1843)
- Scientific career
- Fields: Astronomy

Francis Baily (28 April 1774 – 30 August 1844) was an English astronomer. He is most famous for his observations of "Baily's beads" during a total eclipse of the Sun. Baily was also a major figure in the early history of the Royal Astronomical Society, as one of the founders and as the president four times.

== Life ==
Baily was born at Newbury in Berkshire in 1774 to Richard Baily. After a tour in the unsettled parts of North America in 1796–1797, his journal of which was edited by Augustus De Morgan in 1856, Baily entered the London Stock Exchange in 1799. The successive publication of Tables for the Purchasing and Renewing of Leases (1802), of The Doctrine of Interest and Annuities (1808), and The Doctrine of Life-Annuities and Assurances (1810), earned him a high reputation as a writer on life-contingencies; he amassed a fortune through diligence and integrity and retired from business in 1825, to devote himself wholly to astronomy.

== Astronomical work ==
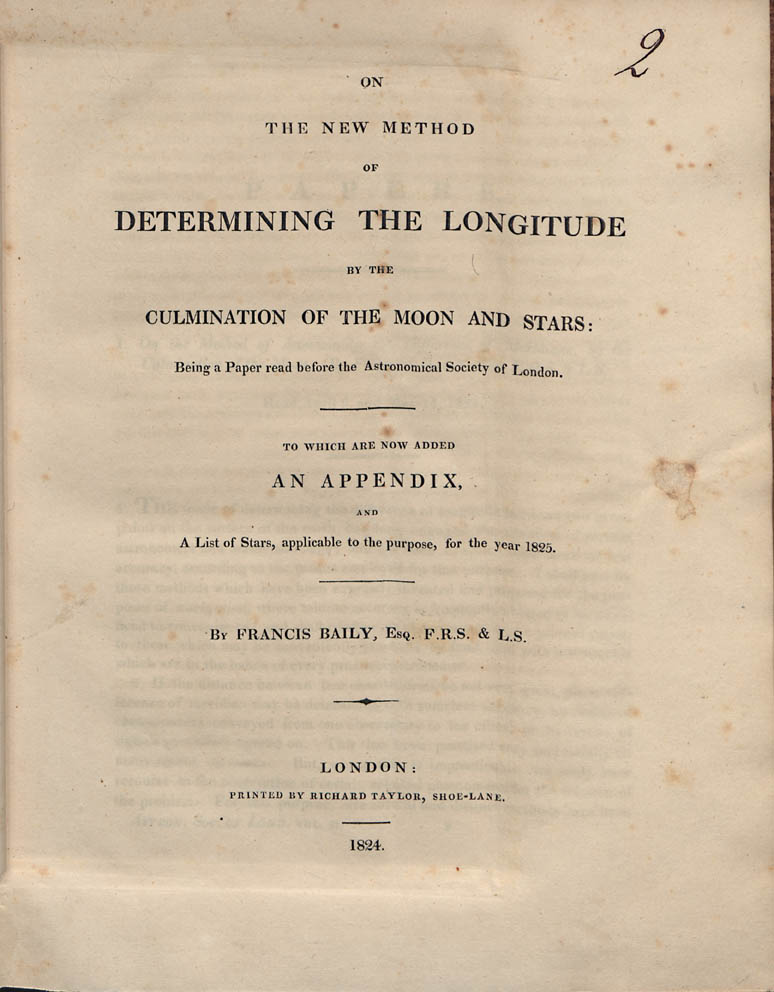
On the new method of determining the longitude by the culmination of the moon and stars, 1824

By 1820, Baily had already taken a leading part in the foundation of the Royal Astronomical Society, and he received its Gold Medal in 1827 for his preparation of the Society's Catalogue of 2881 stars (Memoirs R. Astr. Soc. ii.). Later, in 1843, he would win the Gold Medal again. He was elected as President of the Royal Astronomical Society four times, with two-year terms each (1825–1827, 1833–1835, 1837–1839 and 1843–1845). No other person has served in the position more than Baily's four times (a record he shares with George Airy), whilst his eight years in the post are a record.

The reform of the Nautical Almanac in 1829 was initiated by his protests. He was elected a Foreign Honorary Member of the American Academy of Arts and Sciences in 1832. He recommended to the British Association in 1837, and in great part executed, the reduction of Joseph de Lalande's and Nicolas de Lacaille's catalogues containing about 57,000 stars; he superintended the compilation of the British Association's Catalogue of 8377 stars (BAC, published 1845); and revised the catalogues of Tobias Mayer, Ptolemy, Ulugh Beg, Tycho Brahe, Edmund Halley and Hevelius (Memoirs R. Astr. Soc. iv, xiii.).

His observations of "Baily's Beads", during an annular eclipse of the Sun on 15 May 1836, at Inch Bonney in Roxburghshire, started the modern series of eclipse expeditions. The phenomenon, which depends upon the irregular shape of the Moon's limb, was so vividly described by him as to attract an unprecedented amount of attention to the total eclipse of 8 July 1842, observed by Baily himself at Pavia.

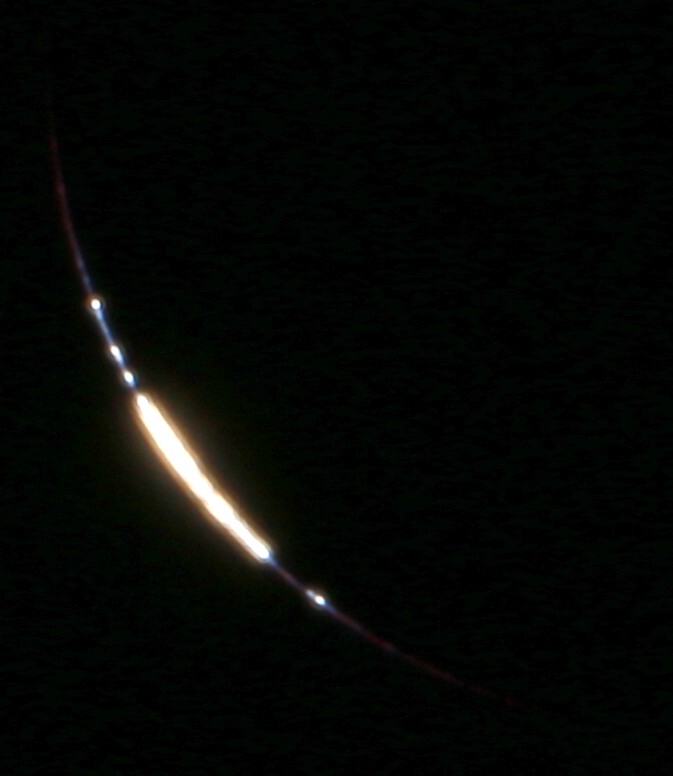
Baily's beads four seconds before totality (21 August 2017)

In other work, he completed and discussed H. Foster's pendulum experiments, deducing from them an ellipticity for the Earth of 1/289.48 (Memoirs R. Astr. Soc. vii.). This value was corrected for the length of the seconds-pendulum by introducing a neglected element of reduction, and was used, in 1843, in the reconstruction of the standards of length. His laborious operations for determining the mean density of the Earth, carried out by Henry Cavendish's method (1838–1842), yielded the authoritative value of 5.66.

Baily died in London on 30 August 1844 and was buried in the family vault in St Mary's Church in Thatcham, Berkshire. His Account of the Rev. John Flamsteed (1835) is of fundamental importance to the scientific history of that time. It included a republication of the British Catalogue.

The lunar crater Baily was named in his honour, as was the rigid and thermally insensitive alloy used to cast the 1855 standard yard (Baily's metal, 16 parts copper, 2.5 parts tin, 1 part zinc), and a local primary school in the town of Thatcham (Francis Baily CofE Primary School).
