= List of people from Las Animas, Colorado =

Coordinates: 38.0667°N 103.2227°W

Location of Las Animas in Colorado

This is a list of some notable people who have lived in the City of Las Animas, Colorado, United States.

== Academia ==
- Clement Markert (1917–1999), biologist

== Arts and entertainment ==
- Ken Curtis (1916–1991), actor, singer
- Mari Yoriko Sabusawa (1920–1994), translator, editor, arts patron
- The Space Lady (1948– ), singer-songwriter, musician

== Business ==
- William Bent (1809–1869), fur trader, rancher

== Military ==
- Ora Graves (1896–1961), U.S. Navy gunner's mate 2nd class, Medal of Honor recipient

== Politics ==
=== National ===
- Lewis Babcock (1943– ), U.S. federal judge
- Robert E. Blackburn (1950– ), U.S. federal judge
- Donetta Davidson (1943– ), Election Assistance Commission chairperson
- Byron G. Rogers (1900–1983), U.S. representative from Colorado
- Llewellyn Thompson (1904–1972), U.S. ambassador to the Soviet Union

=== State ===
- Kenneth Kester (1936–2018), Colorado state legislator

=== Local ===
- Emil Ganz (1838–1922), mayor of Phoenix, Arizona
- Norma O. Walker (1928–2023), mayor of Aurora, Colorado

== Sports ==
- Bailey Santistevan (1901–1954), coach; inducted into the American Legion Hall of Fame; considered one of the most successful coaches in Legion baseball

== See also ==
- List of people from Colorado
- Bibliography of Colorado
- Geography of Colorado
- History of Colorado
- Index of Colorado-related articles
- List of Colorado-related lists
- Outline of Colorado
