= Edmond Bailly =

Edmond Bailly may refer to:

- Edmond Bailly (composer) (1850–1916), French librarian and publisher
- Edmond Bailly (footballer), Swiss footballer
