= Peter Bailey =

Peter Bailey may refer to:

- A. Peter Bailey (born 1938), American journalist, author, and lecturer
- Peter Bailey (cricketer) (born 1939), Australian cricketer
- Peter Hamilton Bailey (1927–2021), Australian public servant and academic
- Peter James Bailey III (1812–1836), soldier and eponym of Bailey County, Texas
- Peter Bailey, a character in It's a Wonderful Life

== See also ==
- Peter Bayley (disambiguation)
- Peter Baillie (1771–1811), British merchant
