= Mount Bailey =

Mount Bailey may refer to:

- Mount Bailey (Antarctica)
- Mount Bailey (Colorado), United States
- Mount Bailey (Oregon), United States

== See also ==
- Bailey (disambiguation)
