= Bailey Branch (Camp Creek tributary) =

Stream in Missouri, U.S.

Coordinates: 38°59′55″N 91°11′43″W

Bailey Branch is a stream in Lincoln and Warren counties in the U.S. state of Missouri. It is a tributary of Camp Creek.

The namesake of Bailey Branch is unknown.

== See also ==
- List of rivers of Missouri
