= Bailey Park =

Bailey Park may refer to:

- Bailey Park (Austin, Texas), a park in Austin, Texas
- Bailey Park (Winston-Salem), a park in Winston-Salem, North Carolina
- Bailey Park (song), a song by Tullycraft
- Bailey Park, Abergavenny, a park in Abergavenny, Monmouthshire, Wales
