= Baily =

Baily may refer to:

== People ==
- Baily (surname)
- Baily Cargill (born 1995), English footballer

== Places ==
- Baily (crater), lunar crater
- Baily Head, Deception Island, Antarctica
- Baily House, Newark, Delaware, United States
- An area of Howth in North County Dublin, Ireland, where the Baily Lighthouse is located

== Other uses ==
- 3115 Baily, main-belt asteroid
- Baily's Beads, a feature of total solar eclipses

== See also ==
- Bailey (disambiguation)
- Bailly (disambiguation)
