= Bailey Creek =

Bailey Creek may refer to:

- Bailey Creek (Hopewell, Virginia), U.S.
- Bailey Creek (Western Australia), a watercourse in Western Australia
- Bailey Creek, a tributary of Pembina River (Alberta), Canada
- Bailey Creek, a stream through South Corning, New York, U.S.
- Bailey Creek, a tributary of Yaquina River, Oregon, U.S.
- Bailey Creek, crossed by South Carolina Highway 203, U.S.
- Bailey Creek, a residential development at Lake Almanor, California, U.S.
- Bailey Creek Trailhead, Black Mountain Off-Road Adventure Area, Kentucky, U.S.

== See also ==
- Bailey Branch (disambiguation)
- Baileys Creek, a stream in Missouri, U.S.
- Baileys Creek, a tributary of Maiden Creek, Pennsylvania, U.S.
