= Bailey Johnson =

Bailey Johnson may refer to:

- Bailey Johnson Sr., father of Maya Angelou and character in her books
- Bailey Johnson Jr., brother of Maya Angelou and character in her books like “Brother”
- Bailey–Johnson 150-metre race
