= Peter Bayley =

Peter Bayley may refer to:

- Peter Bayley (poet) (c. 1778–1823), English writer and poet
- Peter Bayley (cricketer) (1916–1996), West Indian cricketer from British Guiana
- Peter Bayley (literary critic) (1921–2015), British academic, fellow in English at University College, Oxford
- Peter Bayley (scholar of French literature) (1944–2018), British academic of French literature

== See also ==
- Peter Bailey (disambiguation)
- Peter Baillie (1771–1811), British merchant
