= Lunar limb =

Edge of the visible surface of the Moon

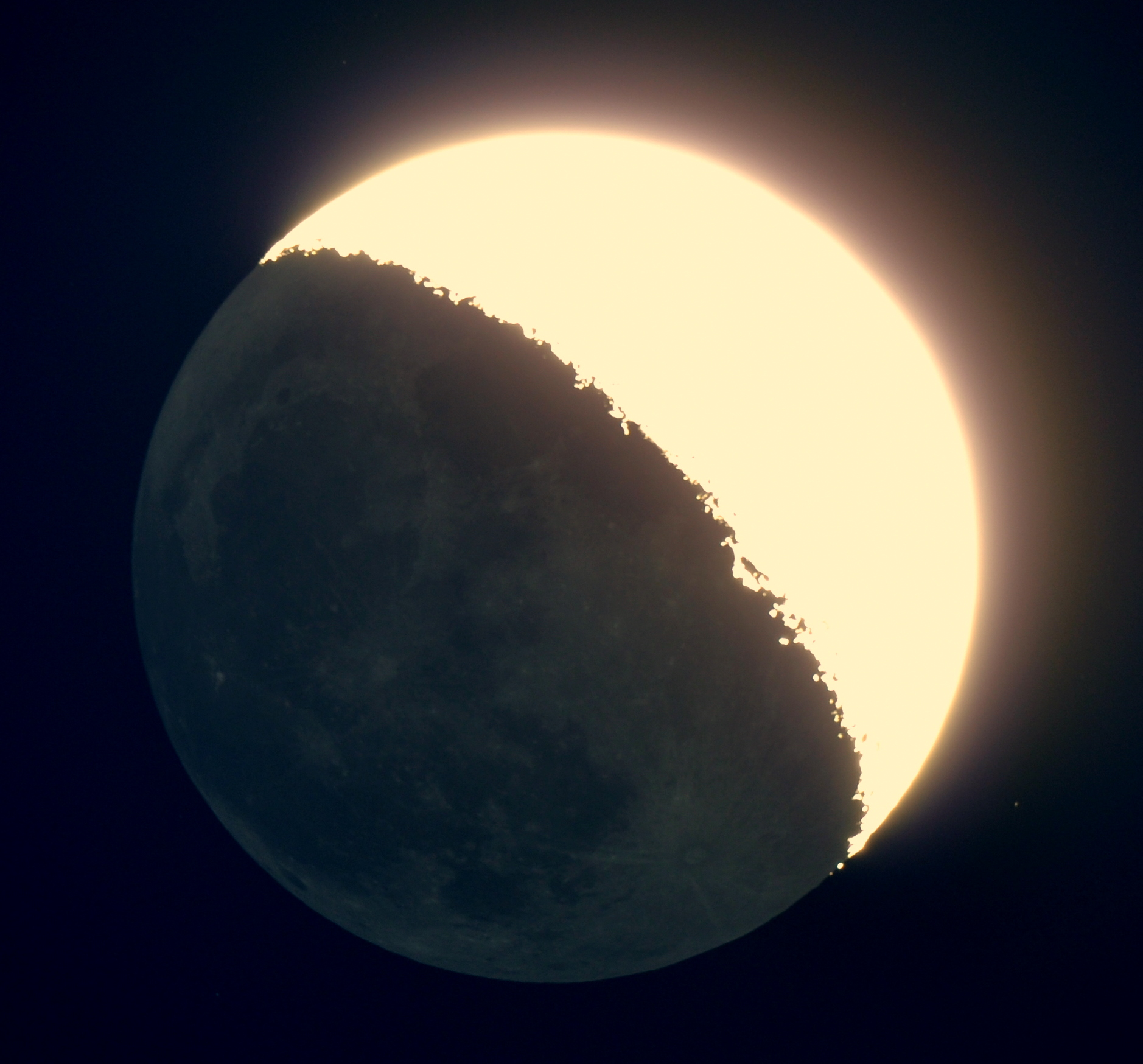
Two contrasting lightnesses of the lunar disc at crescent phase, overexposed to show earthshine. Across the Moon, the lunar terminator is visible, the borderline between the Moon's day and night; the lunar limb is the Moon's profile against the dark sky, top right in this picture.

The lunar limb is the edge of the visible surface (disc) of the Moon as viewed from Earth. Seen from afar, it looks like a circular arc, but with higher resolution, it can be seen that the Moon’s surface is not flat and therefore its profile is irregular. In the 17th century, the irregularity of the lunar limb was observed by Galileo Galilei using a telescope, and the discovery was mentioned in his 1610 treatise titled Sidereus Nuncius.

The lunar limb is not always the same: because of the libration of the Moon, i.e. small rotational movements as seen from Earth, its profile changes; this complicates the task of precisely calculating eclipse times and durations. However, with elevation data from the mapping of the lunar surface, a three-dimensional model including mountains and valleys can be created and the lunar profile for any given time predicted with a high degree of accuracy. The irregularity of the lunar limb is the cause of Baily's beads, which are collimated rays of sunlight that shine through in some places while not in others during a solar eclipse.

The contrast of the bright lunar disc against a black night sky makes the lunar limb a popular target when testing telescope optics (including binoculars).
