= Briley =

Briley may refer to:

== People ==
=== Surname ===
- Alex Briley, member of Village People
- Beverly Briley, American politician
- Briley Brothers, American spree killers
- David Briley (born 1964), American politician
- Jonathan Briley, the 9/11 "Falling Man"
- Martin Briley, English musician
- John Briley, American writer, best known for "Gandhi" (1982)
- Rob Briley (born 1966), American politician

=== Given name ===
- Briley Casanova (born 1994), American gymnast
- Briley Moore (born 1998), American professional football player
- Briley Piper (born 1980), American criminal

== Places ==
- Briley Township, Michigan
