= Bailey Williams =

Bailey Williams may refer to:

- Bailey Williams (footballer, born 1997), Australian rules footballer who plays for the Western Bulldogs in the Australian Football League
- Bailey Williams (footballer, born 2000), Australian rules footballer who plays for the West Coast Eagles in the Australian Football League
