= Bailey Barton Burritt =

American advocate

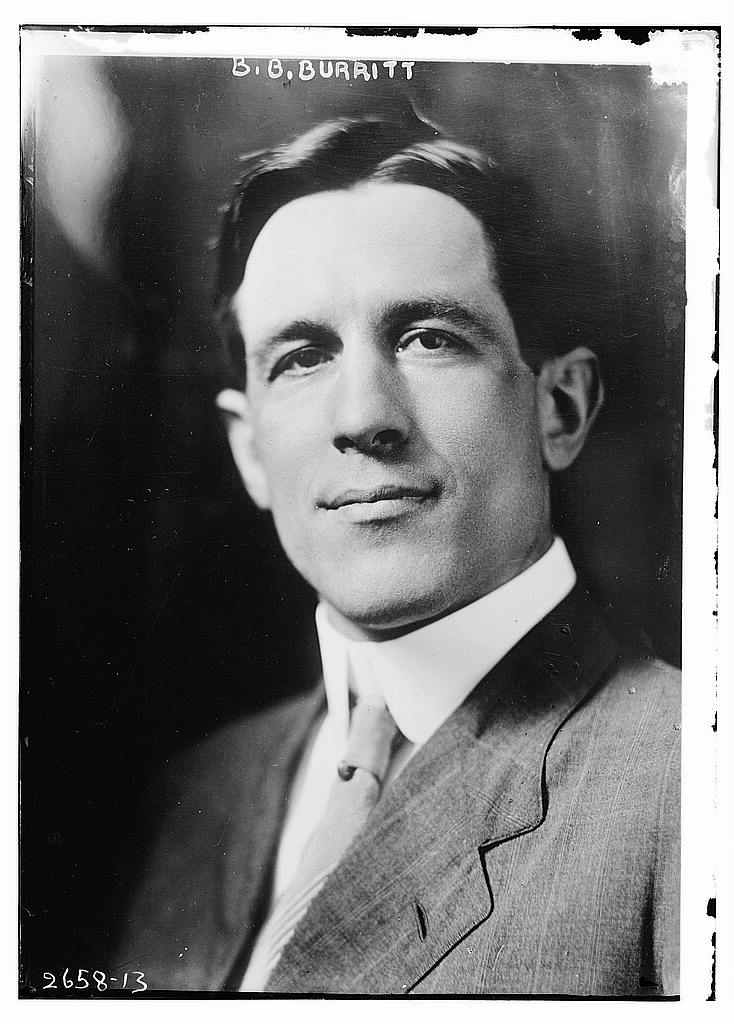
Bailey Barton Burritt circa 1913

Bailey Barton Burritt (31 May 1878 in Monroe County, New York – 18 June 1954) was a United States public health and social welfare advocate known as "the father of the family health movement." He was the chairman of the executive council of the Community Service Society.

== Biography ==
He graduated from the University of Rochester in 1902 and Columbia University in 1903. He married Ruth Hogarth Dennis (1879–1960) on May 18, 1909.
