= Mount Bailey (Colorado) =

Mountain in Colorado, United States

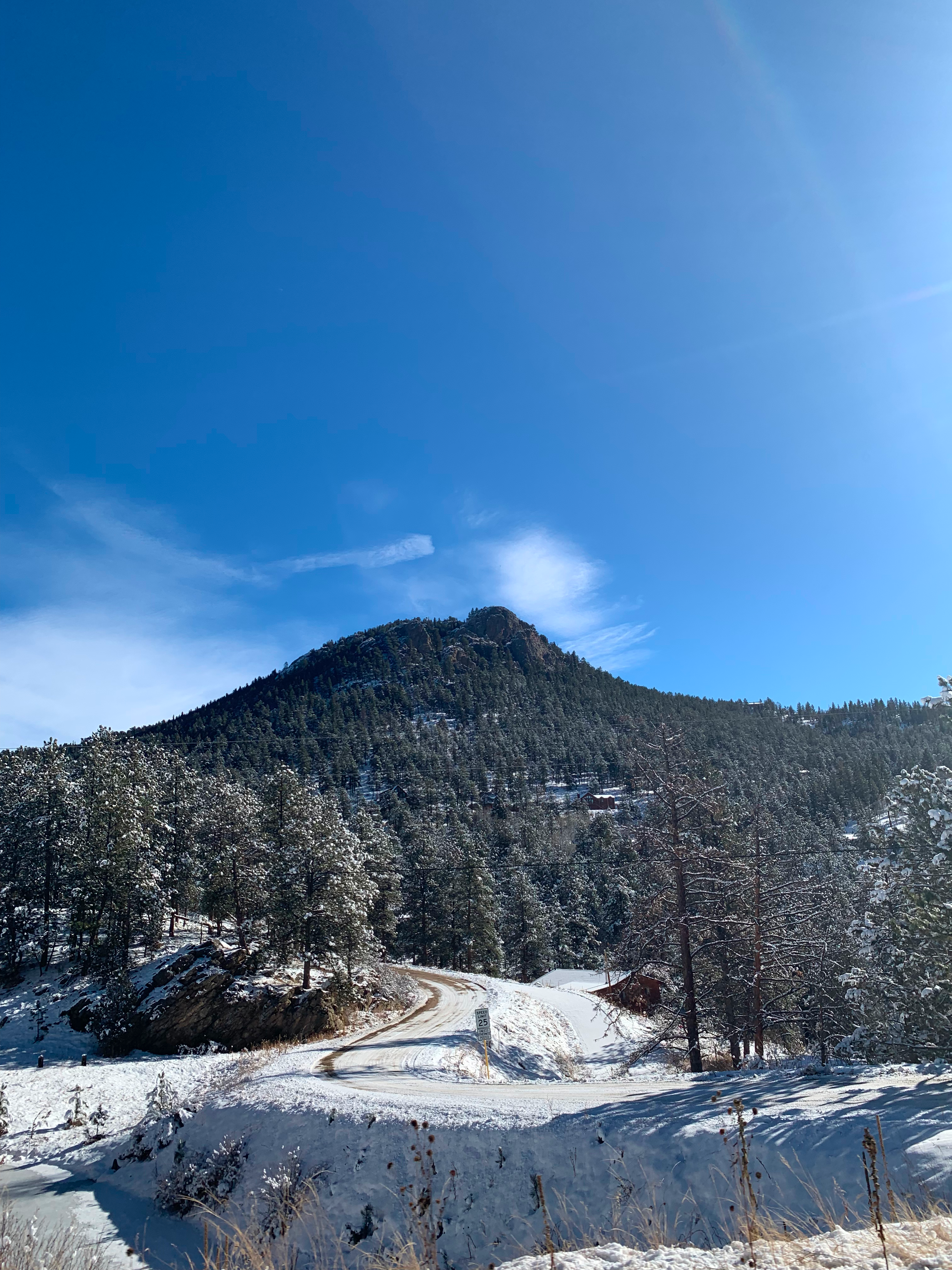
- Mount Bailey as seen from US Route 285

Highest point
- Elevation: 9,089 ft (2,770 m)
- Prominence: 549 ft (167 m)
- Isolation: 3.36 mi (5.41 km)
- Coordinates: 39°24′54″N 105°27′35″W

Geography
- Location within Colorado
- Location: Park County, Colorado, U.S.
- Parent range: Front Range
- Topo map(s): USGS 7.5' topographic map Bailey, Colorado

Mount Bailey is a mountain summit in the Front Range of the Rocky Mountains of North America. The 9,089-foot (2,770 m) peak is located 1.0 mile (1.6 km) northeast (bearing 48°) of the community of Bailey in Park County, Colorado, United States.

== See also ==
- List of Colorado mountain ranges
- List of Colorado mountain summits
  - List of Colorado fourteeners
  - List of Colorado 4000 meter prominent summits
  - List of the most prominent summits of Colorado
- List of Colorado county high points
