= Bəyli =

- Location within Azerbaijan Location within Shaki-Zagatala Economic Region
- Coordinates: 40°49′18″N 47°37′00″E
- Country: Azerbaijan
- Rayon: Qabala
- Time zone: UTC+4 (AZT)
  - Summer (DST): UTC+5 (AZT)

Bəyli (also, Beyli) is a village in the Qabala Rayon of Azerbaijan.
