= Baily's beads =

Feature of total and annular solar eclipses

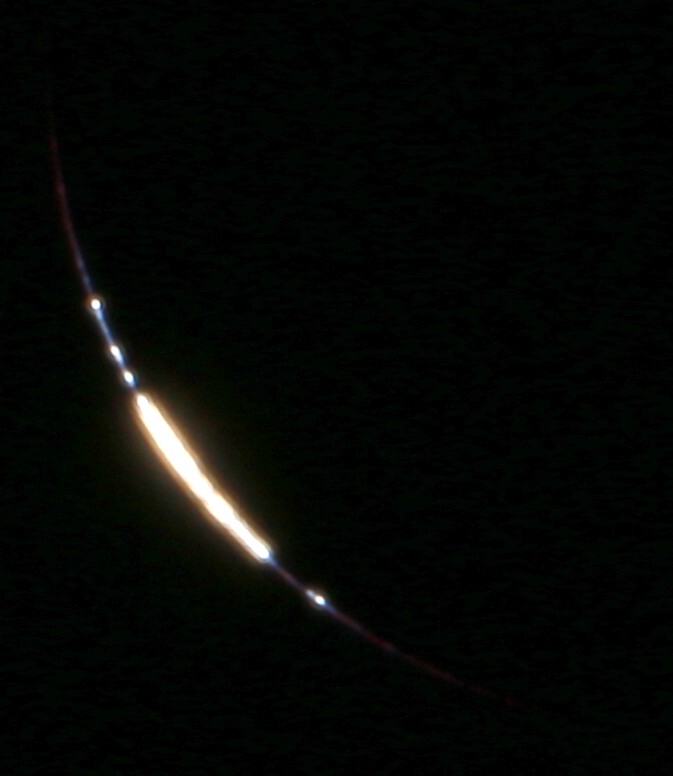
Baily's beads photographed four seconds before totality of the solar eclipse of August 21, 2017

The Baily's beads, diamond ring or more rarely double diamond ring effects, are features of total and annular solar eclipses. Although caused by the same phenomenon, they are distinct events during these types of solar eclipses. As the Moon covers the Sun during a solar eclipse, the rugged topography of the lunar limb allows beads of sunlight to shine through in some places while not in others. They are named for Francis Baily, who explained the effects in 1836. The diamond ring effects are seen when only one or two beads are left, appearing as shining "diamonds" set in a bright ring around the lunar silhouette. The extremely narrow sliver of the solar photosphere crescent before and after totality can briefly appear as another diamond ring, albeit with a much larger diamond.

Lunar topography has considerable relief because of the presence of mountains, craters, valleys and other topographical features. The irregularities of the lunar limb profile (the "edge" of the Moon, as seen from a distance) are known accurately from observations of grazing occultations of stars. Astronomers thus have a fairly good idea which mountains and valleys will cause the beads to appear in advance of the eclipse. While Baily's beads are seen briefly for a few seconds at the center of the eclipse path, their duration is maximized near the edges of the path of the umbra, lasting around 90 seconds.

It is not safe to view Baily's beads or the diamond ring effect without proper eye protection because in both cases the photosphere is still visible.

== Observation ==
Observers in the path of totality of a solar eclipse see first a gradual covering of the Sun by the lunar silhouette for just a small duration of time from around one minute to four minutes, followed by the diamond ring effect (visible without filters) as the last bit of photosphere disappears. As the burst of light from the ring fades, Baily's beads appear as the last bits of the bright photosphere shine through valleys aligned at the edge of the Moon. As the Baily's beads disappear behind the advancing lunar edge (the beads also reappear at the end of totality), a thin reddish edge called the chromosphere (the Greek chrōma meaning "color") appears. Though the reddish hydrogen radiation is most visible to the unaided eye, the chromosphere also emits thousands of additional spectral lines.

Beaded solar eclipses occur during an eclipse when the Sun and Moon have nearly identical apparent sizes. During a beaded eclipse, the rim of the Moon displays Baily's beads at many points all around the Moon and the brightness of the Sun remains from around 2000x to 10x greater than a complete total eclipse (ranging from about magnitude 99.8% to slightly more than 100.00%). The use of a smooth mean lunar radius to mathematically determine totality versus annularity does not take into account the deeper lunar valley floors which display the beaded photosphere points. Some authors have argued that since the Sun's photosphere is not fully extinguished during the beaded totality of the shortest hybrid total eclipses (such as the solar eclipse of 3 October 1986), these eclipses should be classified as only annular eclipses. The diamond ring effects in the moments just before and after a beaded eclipse are often referred to as diamond tiaras. Beaded annularity or totality duration is very short - less than about 12 seconds. However, the annularity duration before and after beaded hybrid totality and beaded annularity can be longer.

== Observational history ==
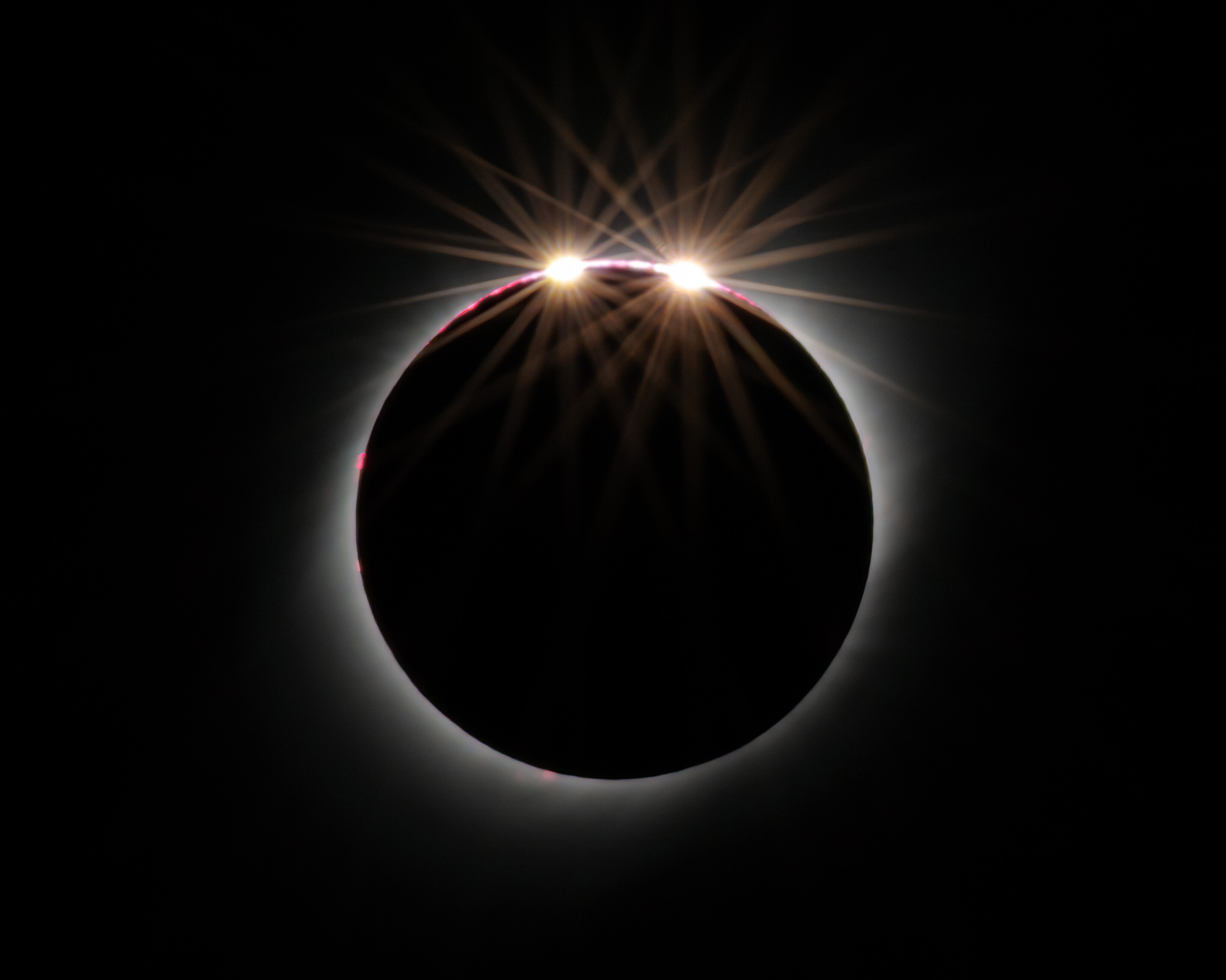
"Double Diamond Ring" Eclipse (2 July 2019)

Although Baily is often said to have discovered the cause of the feature which bears his name, Edmond Halley made the first recorded observations of Baily's beads during the solar eclipse of 3 May 1715. (Note: Great Britain did not adopt the Gregorian calendar until 1752, so at the time of the eclipse, the date was recorded as 22 April 1715.) Halley described and correctly ascertained the cause of the effect in his "Observations of the late Total Eclipse of the Sun [...]" in the Philosophical Transactions of the Royal Society:

About two Minutes before the Total Immersion, the remaining part of the Sun was reduced to a very fine Horn, whose Extremeties seemed to lose their Acuteness, and to become round like Stars ... which Appearance could proceed from no other Cause but the Inequalities of the Moon's Surface, there being some elevated parts thereof near the Moon's Southern Pole, by whose Interposition part of that exceedingly fine Filament of Light was intercepted.

The term "Baily's beads" then came into use after Baily described the phenomenon to the Royal Astronomical Society in December 1836. Having observed the solar eclipse of 15 May 1836 from Jedburgh in the Scottish Borders, he reported that:

...when the cusps of the sun were about 40 degrees asunder, a row of lucid points, like a string of beads, irregular in size, and distance from each other, suddenly formed around that part of the circumference of the moon that was about to enter on the sun's disc.

=== Double diamond ring effect ===
Before the diamond ring effect during a total solar eclipse, a sequence of small bits of sunlight known as Baily's Beads can be observed. These beads quickly disappear one by one until only one is left. By using precise elevation models of the Moon's irregular surface, it is now possible to predict where Baily's beads will converge to create the double diamond ring effect instead of just one bead. A map of the path taken by this effect was created and used to determine the cities along the path of totality during the April 8th, 2024, total solar eclipse.

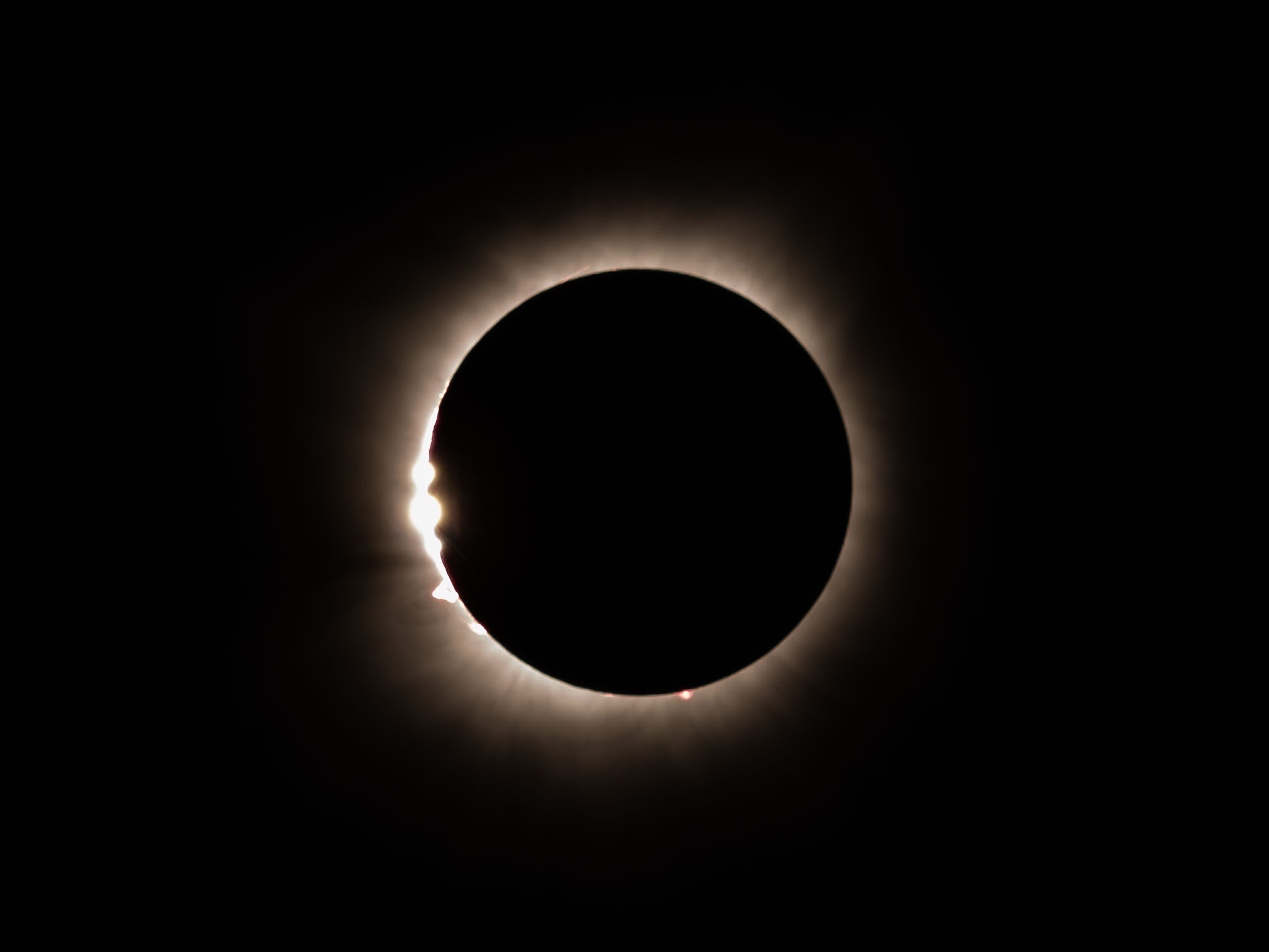
Image taken during the Solar eclipse of April 8, 2024 from the campus of Arkansas State University, Jonesboro, Arkansas

== In media ==
In 1735, painter and architect Cosmas Damian Asam completed a painting that is probably the earliest known work that realistically depicts a total solar eclipse and diamond ring.

The Diamond Ring effect is seen during the credit opening sequence of Star Trek: Voyager (1995–2001), albeit from a fictitious extrasolar body, as seen from space.

The Baily's beads phenomenon is seen during the credit opening sequence of the NBC TV show Heroes (2006–2010).

== Gallery ==
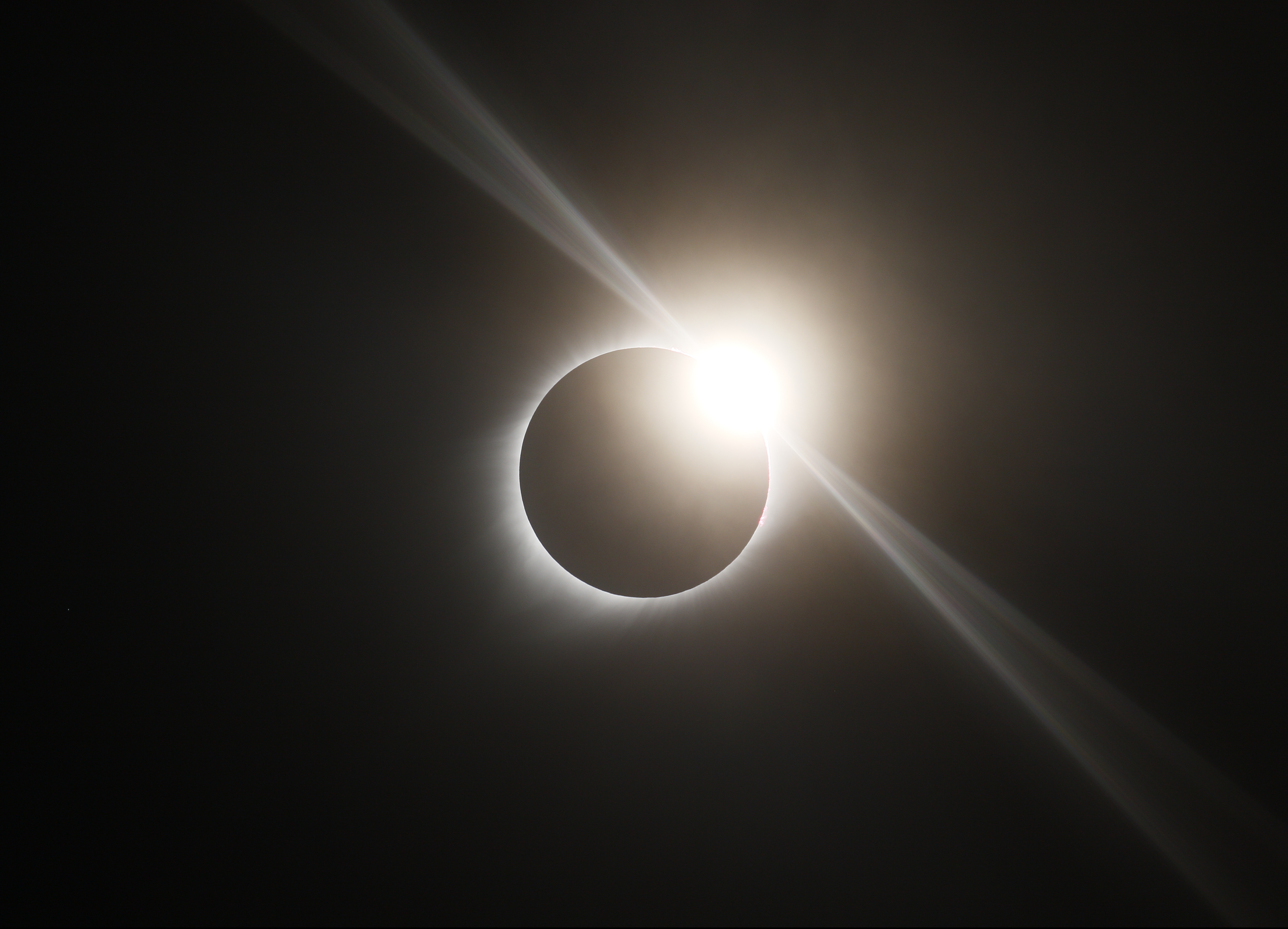
Diamond ring effect visible during the total solar eclipse of August 21, 2017, in Ravenna, Nebraska. (The diffraction spikes emanating tangentially from the diamond are an artifact of the camera optics, not a natural phenomenon.)

The diamond ring effect during the solar eclipse of March 29, 2006, as seen from Kamyzyak, Russia

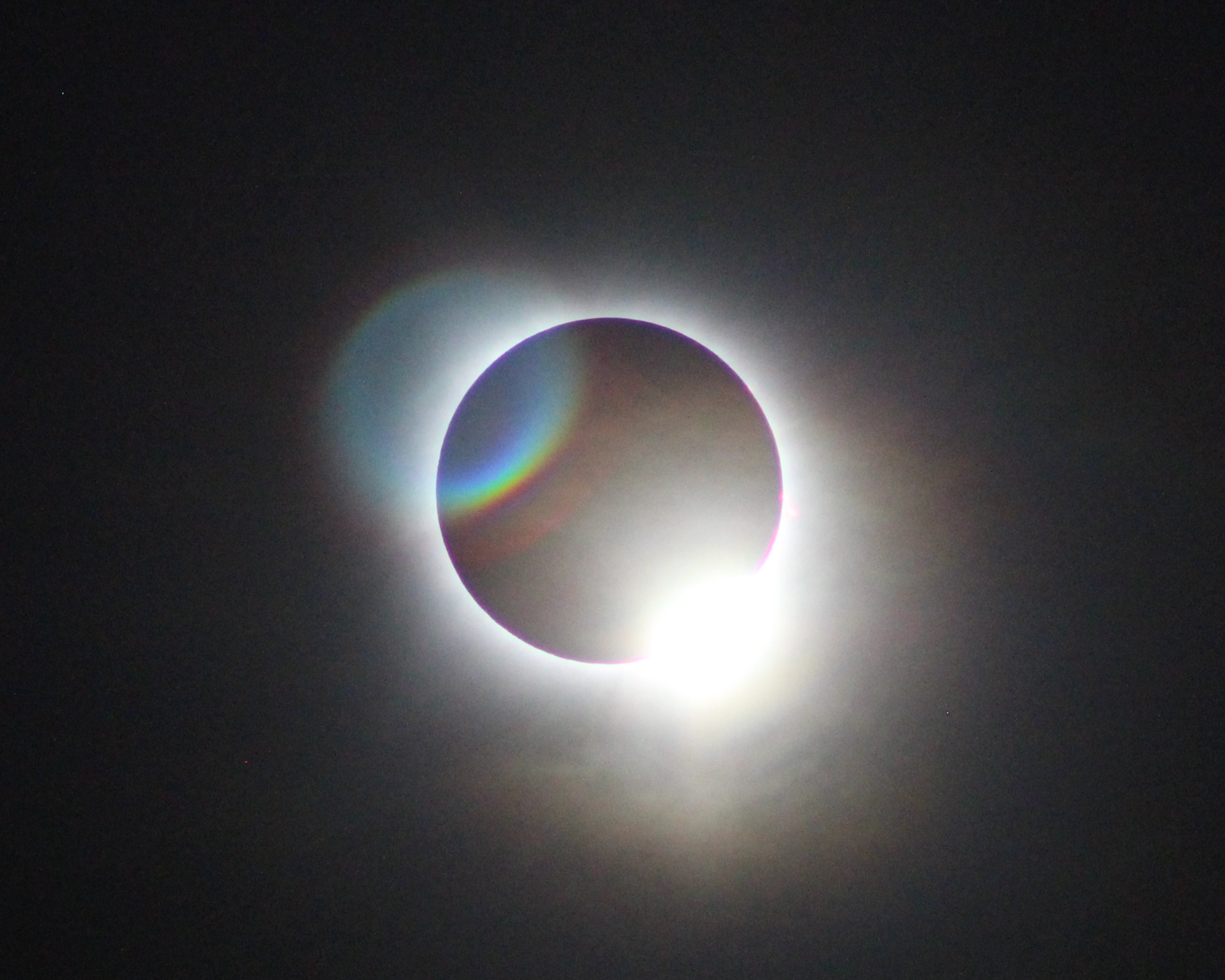
The diamond ring effect as totality ends during the total solar eclipse of April 8, 2024, in Red River County, Texas. The rainbow coloration is a lens flare and not a natural phenomenon.

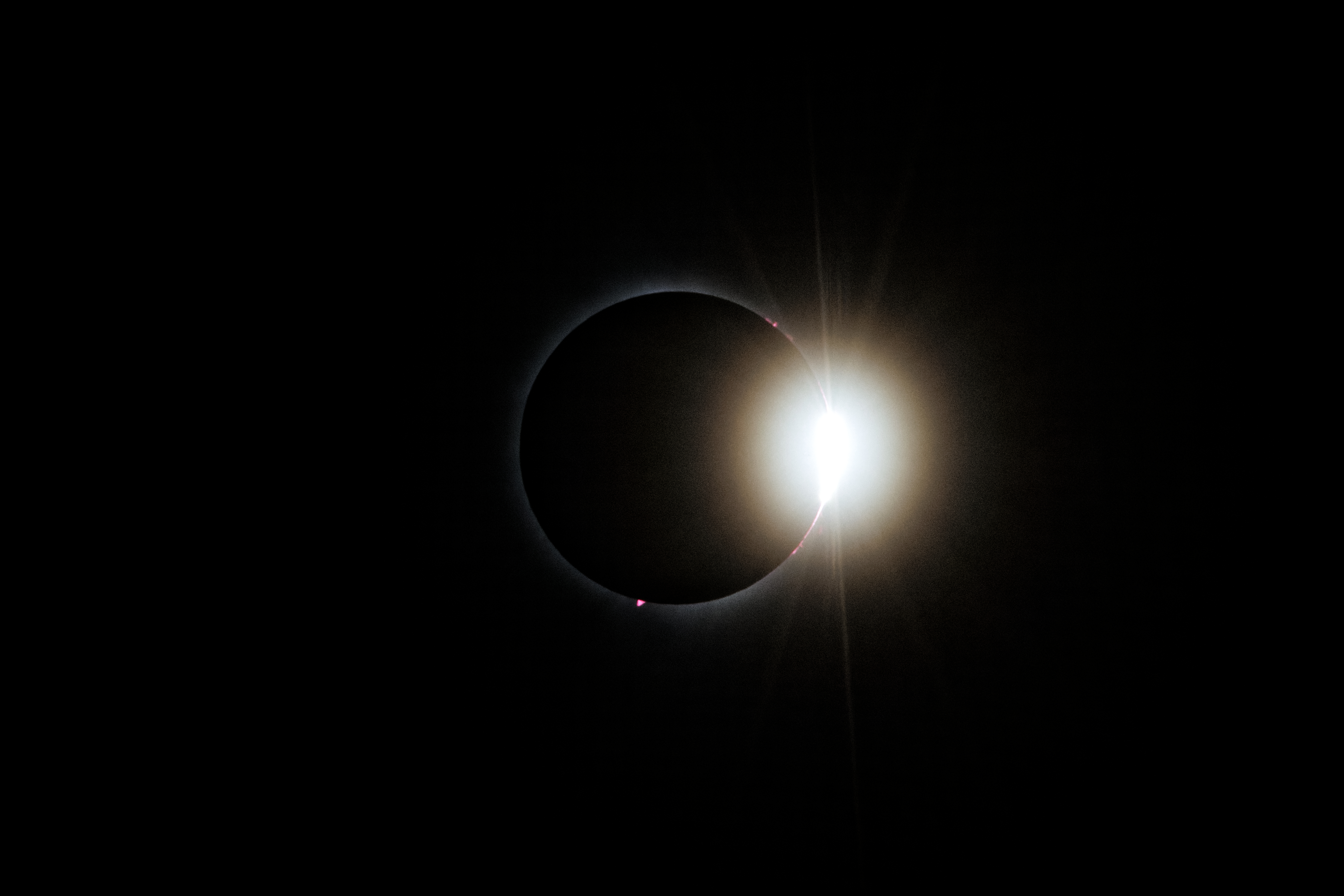
Post-totality diamond ring effect visible during the total solar eclipse of April 8, 2024, in Montreal, Quebec, viewed from Lower Field at McGill University.
