= Ernest Joseph Bailly =

Flemish painter

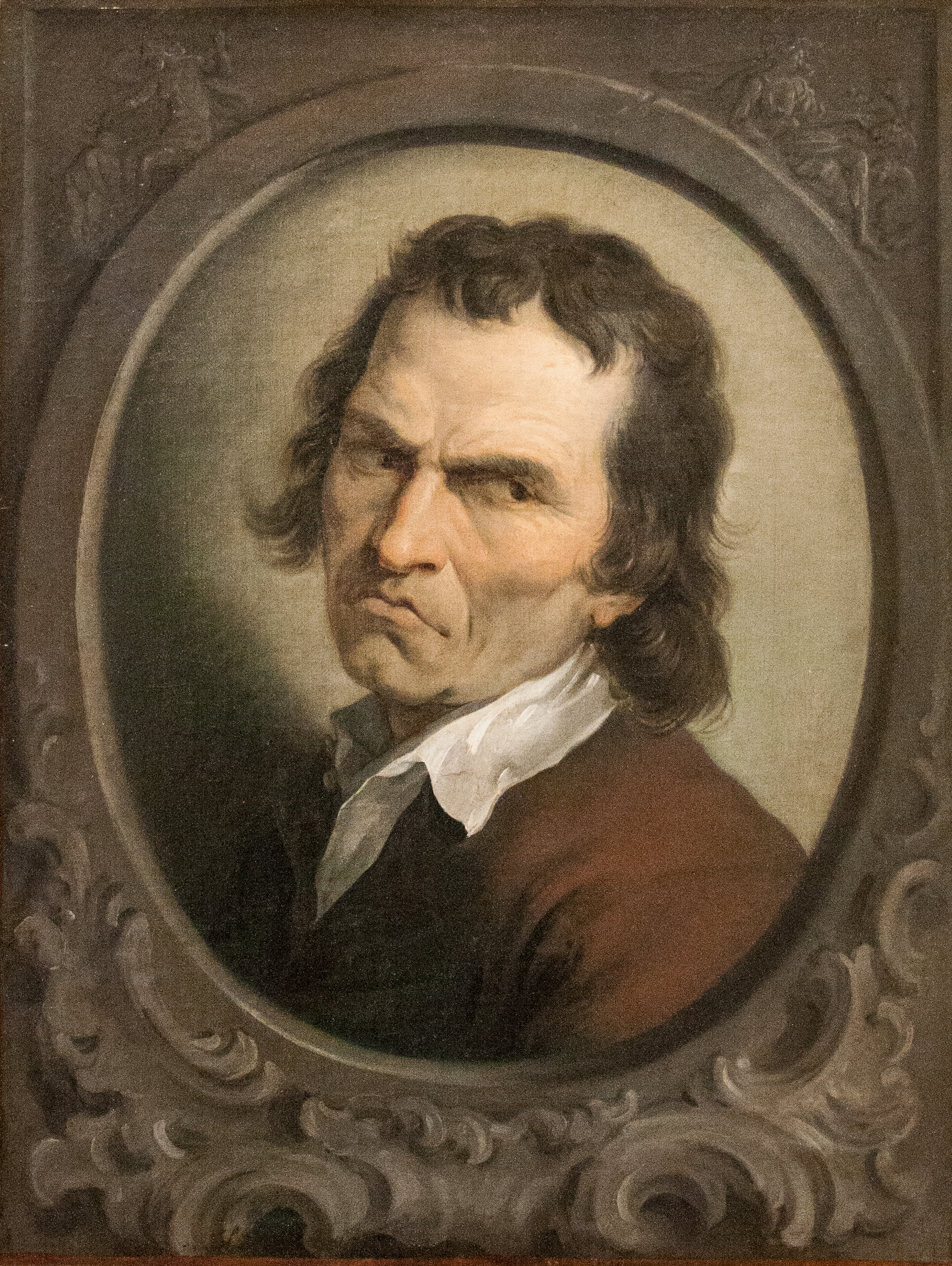
In Contempt of Hate

Ernest Joseph Bailly (born 1753, Lille – 1823, Ghent) or Baillu was a Flemish painter who studied first in the Academy of Ghent, then in Antwerp, and subsequently in Paris. In 1777 he returned to Ghent, and was soon afterwards commissioned by the magistracy to paint four portraits of the Emperor Leopold II. He also painted a portrait of Maria Christina of Austria. In 1792 he was awarded a prize, at the Academy of Ghent, for his Œdipus Coloneus, and in 1811 he received a gold medal for an Allegory on the Birth of the King of Rome; both of these works he presented to the Society of Art and Literature of Ghent. He died in that city in 1823.

Bailly devoted himself much to decorative paintings on walls, wainscots, and furniture, in which branch of art he became very famous.
