= Baily (crater) =

Crater on the Moon

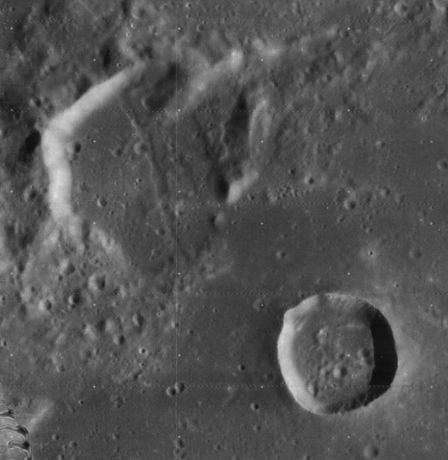
- Lunar Orbiter 4 image showing Baily (upper left) and Baily A (lower right)
- Coordinates: 49.7°N 30.4°E
- Diameter: 25.68 km (15.96 mi)
- Depth: 0.52 km (0.32 mi)
- Colongitude: 330° at sunrise
- Eponym: Francis Baily

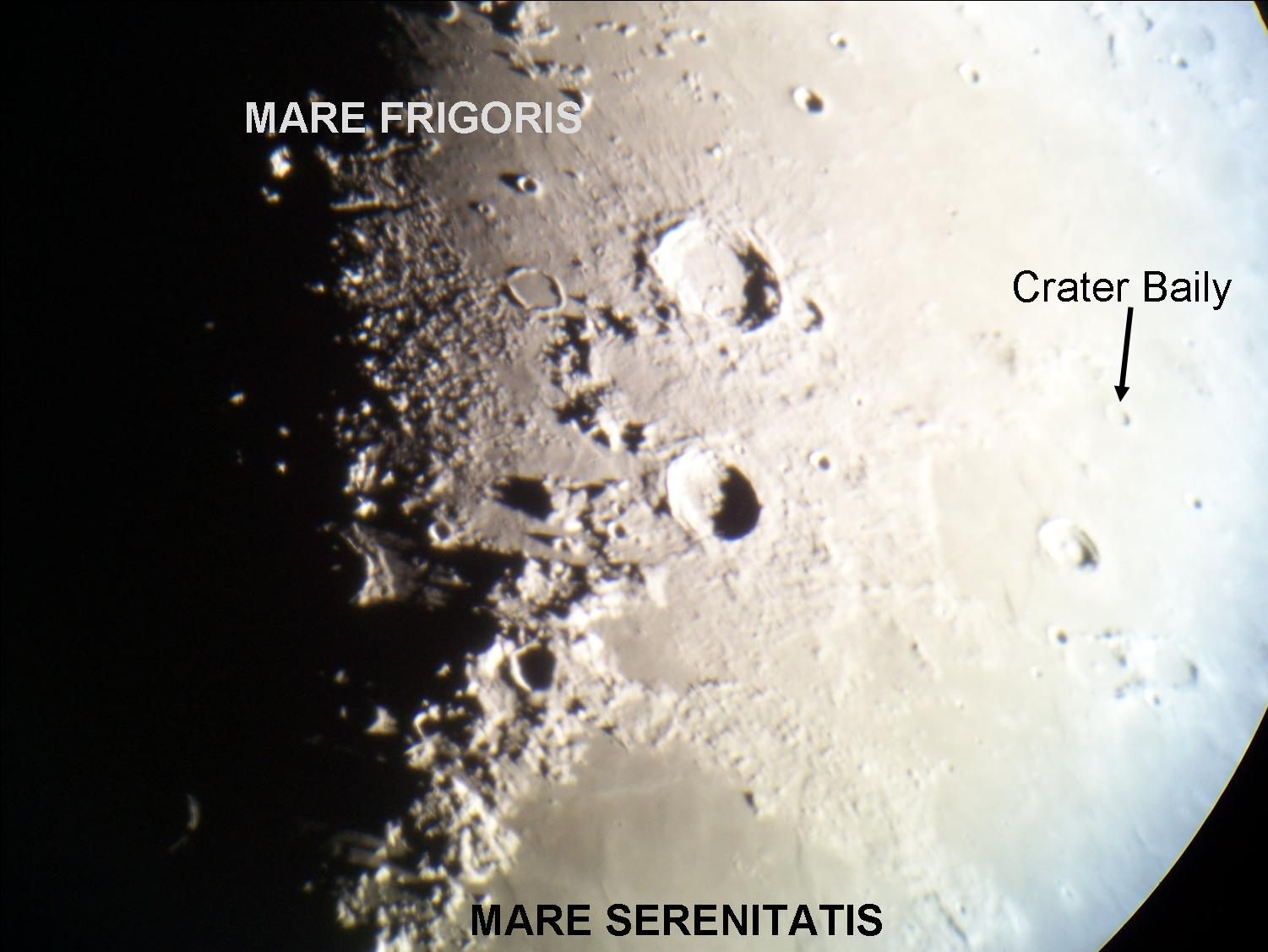
Location of the lunar crater Baily as photographed at the McDonald Observatory

Baily is the remnant of a lunar impact crater on the boundary between Mare Frigoris to the north and Lacus Mortis to the south. The nearest crater of note is Bürg to the south-southwest. To the west of Baily is a pyroclastic vent. Further to the west is the prominent Aristoteles.

The crater interior has been flooded by basaltic mare in the past, and only the northern half of the crater rim remains relatively intact. There is an outward bulge in the northeastern rim, possibly the remnant of another crater formation that once overlapped Baily. Save for an unnamed rill running across the floor, the crater interior is flat and relatively featureless, with no impacts of significance. The surviving outer rim reaches a maximum elevation of about 0.5 km.

This crater is named after British astronomer Francis Baily (1774-1844). The name was introduced into lunar nomenclature by German astronomer Johann von Mädler. Its designation was formally adopted by the International Astronomical Union in 1935.

== Satellite craters ==
By convention these features are identified on lunar maps by placing the letter on the side of the crater midpoint that is closest to Baily.

Baily	Latitude	Longitude	Diameter
A	48.6° N	31.3° E	16 km
B	51.0° N	35.1° E	7 km
K	51.5° N	30.5° E	3 km
