= Bryan Bayley =

New Zealand cricketer

Personal information
- Born: 17 April 1933; Greymouth, New Zealand
- Died: 19 June 2012 (aged 79); Hamilton, New Zealand
- Source: Cricinfo, 14 October 2020

Bryan Bayley (17 April 1933 – 19 June 2012) was a New Zealand cricketer. He played in twelve first-class matches for Canterbury and Northern Districts between 1957 and 1965.
