= Camp Creek (Cuivre River tributary) =

Stream in the US state of Missouri

Coordinates: 39°01′56″N 91°12′14″W

Camp Creek is a stream in Montgomery, Warren and Lincoln counties in Missouri. It is a tributary of the West Fork of the Cuivre River.

The stream headwaters in eastern Montgomery County are at and the confluence with the West Fork of the Cuivre in southwest Lincoln County is at . The stream passes through the northwest corner of Warren County between those points.

Camp Creek was named for the fact pioneers camped near its course.

== See also ==
- List of rivers of Missouri
