= Robert Bayley =

Robert Slater Bayley (c.1800–14 November 1859) was an English independent minister.

== Life ==
Bayley was educated at Highbury Theological College, and on quitting that institution was appointed to a pastorate at Louth, Lincolnshire. After some years of labour at that place, he moved (1835) to Sheffield to take charge of the Howard Street congregation, where he remained for about ten years. While there he exerted himself actively in the establishment of an educational institution called the People's College, where he was also in the habit of lecturing on a variety of subjects. Here also in 1846 he started a monthly periodical called the People's College Journal. It was printed at the college, and intended to advance the interests of popular education. It came to an untimely end in May of the following year.

The next scene of Bayley's labours was the Ratcliff Highway, London, which he left in about 1857 for Hereford, where he remained until his death from apoplexy on 14 November 1859.

== Works ==
- 'A History of Louth.'
- 'Nature considered as a Revelation, in two parts: part i. being an argument to prove that nature ought to be regarded as a revelation; part ii. furnishing specimens of the manner in which the material revelation may be explained,’ 1836, 12mo; a small work of no pretensions to either a scientific or a philosophical character.
- 'Lectures on the Early History of the Christian Church.'
- 'A new Concordance to the Hebrew Bible juxta editionem Hooghtianam, and accommodated to the English version.' 1 vol. 8vo, with a dedication to the Lord Bishop of Lincoln.
- 'Two Lectures on the Educational Question delivered in the Town Hall, Sheffield.'
- 'A course of Lectures on the Inspiration of the Scriptures,’ 1852, 12mo; and other lectures and sermons.
