= Braly =

Braly may refer to:

== People with the surname ==
- Angela Braly (born 1961), American executive
- Malcolm Braly (1925–1980), American author
- Matt Braly (born 1988), American animator, storyboard artist, director, and writer
- Terrell Braly (born 1953), American businessman
- W. C. Braly (1841–1920), American politician

== Places ==
- Braly, California, former name of Brawley, California
- Braly Municipal Stadium, in Florence, Alabama
