= Baley =

Baley may refer to:

== People ==
- Gillum Baley (1813–1895), American pioneer and judge
- Héctor Baley (born 1950), Argentine footballer
- Henry Baley (died 1701), governor of the Hudson's Bay Company
- James M. Baley Jr. (1912–2003), American lawyer and judge
- Stefan Baley (1885–1952), Polish psychologist
- Virko Baley (born 1938), Ukrainian-American musician
- Michael Alston Baley, stage name of David Brimmer (born 1957), American voice actor and fight choreographer
- Baley (DJ), born Gabriel Ogrin, Slovenian DJ and music producer

== Places ==
- Baley, Bulgaria, a village in Vidin Province, Bulgaria
- Baley, Russia, and Baley Urban Settlement, Zabaykalsky Krai, Russia
  - Baley Airport
- Baley Nunatak, a hill in Antarctica

== Other uses ==
- Elijah Baley, a fictional character in the Robot series by Isaac Asimov

== See also ==
- Bayley (disambiguation)
- Bailey (disambiguation)
