= Braley =

Braley is a surname. Notable people with the surname include:

- Berton Braley (1882–1966), American poet
- Bruce Braley (born 1957), the Democratic Congressman for Iowa's first Congressional District
- Callum Braley (born 1994), English rugby union player
- David Braley (1941–2020), Canadian sports tycoon and senator
- Scott Braley (born 1947), leftist activist and regional organizer for the Michigan State University's chapter of the SDS

== See also ==
- Braley, Missouri, a community in the United States
- David Braley Athletic Centre, new sports venue at McMaster University in Hamilton, Ontario, which opened up in 2007
