= Bailey Doogan =

American artist (1941–2022)

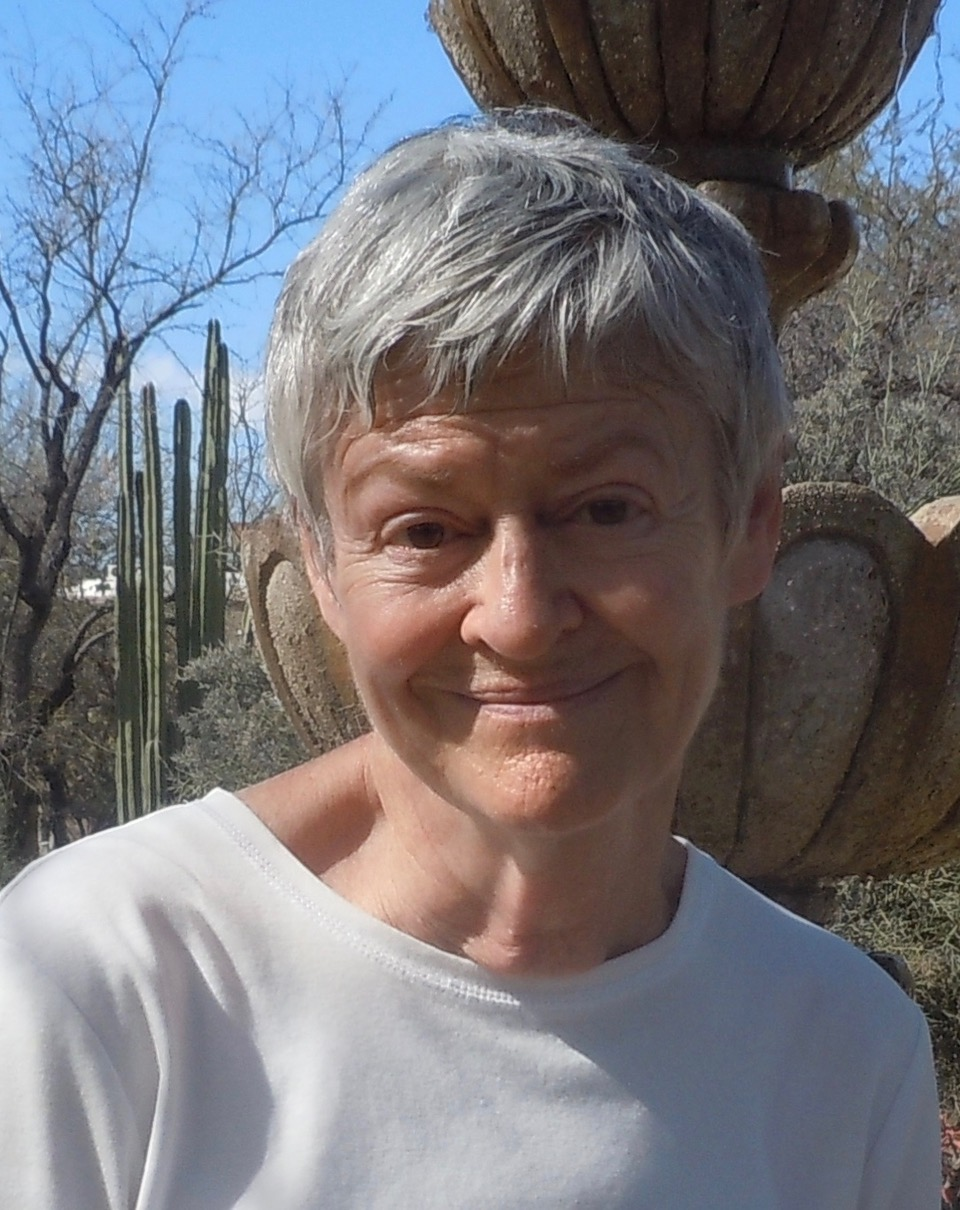
- Doogan in 2014
- Born: Margaret Mary Bailey; October 24, 1941; Philadelphia, Pennsylvania, U.S.
- Died: July 4, 2022 (aged 80); Tucson, Arizona, U.S.
- Other name: Margaret Bailey Doogan
- Education: BFA, Moore College of Art (1963), MA, University of California in Los Angeles (1977)
- Occupations: Artist and professor emerita
- Known for: Large-scale oil paintings and charcoal drawings

Bailey Doogan (October 24, 1941 – July 4, 2022) was an American artist best known for her large-scale, feminist paintings and drawings that offer an unflinching look at the aging, female body and that tackle cultural issues like the equation of beauty with youth. Doogan's artwork has been reviewed in numerous publications, including Art in America, The Nation, Art Journal, Ms., ARTnews and the New Art Examiner. Her work also has been reproduced in Harper's Magazine.

== Childhood and education ==
Bailey Doogan was born Margaret Mary Bailey on October 24, 1941, in Philadelphia. She was the daughter of William Mary Rowe and Edward William Bailey. Her father was a milkman, and her mother worked as a waitress and a salesclerk. Doogan grew up in a thoroughly Catholic world, and she said that growing up Catholic, working as a graphic designer in the advertising world (her first career) and the combination of feminism and the women's art movement were the three major influences in her life.

Doogan was the first person in her family to attend college, despite her father's objections. She attended Moore College of Art and Design in Philadelphia on a scholarship. Although Moore College had a fine arts program, Doogan pursued a more practical major and earned a bachelor's degree in illustration, which led to her first career in advertising. In 1977, during a sabbatical from her University of Arizona teaching position (her second career), Doogan earned a master's degree in animated film from the University of California in Los Angeles.

== Life and career ==
After completing her bachelor's degree, Doogan moved to New York and joined the graphic design firm DeMartin Marona and Associates where she re-designed the well-known Morton Salt Girl icon in 1968. In her essay “Logo Girls,” Doogan told the story of presenting multiple designs of “Mortie” (as the icon was known in her design office) to the Morton board of directors, who rejected all the first versions, saying things like: “She looks like a smarty pants!” “She looks easy!” “Not enough leg!” Doogan's final version of the girl carrying an umbrella and a leaking box of salt was used until 2014 when a few changes were made (the type font was changed and some of the line work was simplified) to update the image for Morton Salt's centennial anniversary. Thirty years later, Doogan's experience with Morton Salt became the inspiration for her life-size pastel “Pour It On."

Despite her award-winning designs and successes in the advertising world, when Doogan discovered that the men who worked for her as the head designer made more money than she did, Doogan quit the graphic design firm even though they offered her a raise. She moved to Tucson, Arizona, in 1969 to teach graphic design at the University of Arizona. A year-long marriage to Ed Doogan, the birth of their daughter Moira and her move to Rancho Linda Vista, an artist's community just north of Tucson in Oracle, transformed her personal life. In Tucson, Doogan began switching from illustration to painting and drawing. After her marriage, she started using the name “Margaret Bailey Doogan” personally and professionally. Later she found the name cumbersome and cut it down to “Bailey Doogan” for her artwork although friends and family always used “Peggy.”

Doogan taught at the University of Arizona until 1999. From 1982 to 1999, she was a professor of design, painting and drawing in the university's art department. From 1999 until her death, she was a University of Arizona professor emerita of painting and drawing. During her academic career, she also served as a visiting artist at over 30 art institutions. Doogan died in Tucson, Arizona, on July 4, 2022, at the age of 80.

== Early work ==
Doogan came to address the issues of women and aging in American society by a path that led through different media and different, but related, subject matter. The thesis for her 1977 master's degree is an animated film called Screw: A Technical Love Poem, which compares the language of love to pieces of hardware. The film is named after a Diane Wakowski poem and uses Wakowski's reading of the poem for its audio. Although Screw is Doogan's single animated film, it was shown worldwide in film festivals as far flung as Australia, Switzerland and Venice (at the 1979 Venice Biennale). Sheldon Reich points to the use of multiple panels, the addition of words and the growing boldness of Doogan's colors in her early paintings as an outgrowth of her work in film.

In the early 1980s, Doogan did several series that involve multiple portraits in pastels, oil pastels and mixed media. For "Articulate," Doogan traveled around the United States interviewing and taping prominent women in the art world (artists, critics and museum administrators). That work culminated at the University of Arizona Museum of Art with a full gallery installation of larger-than-life, mixed-media portraits of the women. The dimly lit gallery included speakers mounted on pylons beside the artworks. Each speaker was playing an edited version of the audio recording of Doogan's interview with the woman in the portrait. The result was a hum of overlapping women's voices talking about their experiences and thoughts about women in the art world.

Punch Ponders His Role And Wonders If ‘Bad’ Is Still Charming; On the Other Hand, Judy Maintains Her Sense of Humor, 1984. Acrylic, oil pastel, glitter, collage on primed paper (each panel "30" x 22", overall 30" x 60") by Bailey Doogan. This triptych reveals Doogan's early use of abstraction, bright colors and multi-panel presentation. The expressionistic image, which depicts a violent scene, is based on the well-known Punch and Judy puppet show.

For her 1984 Punch and Judy series, Doogan created oil paintings in diptychs and triptychs, prints and even a painting with a 3-D proscenium puppet stage. As Doogan said, Punch is the original anti-hero who kills everyone, even his wife and child, using his “slapstick,” the origin of the term “slapstick humor.” Yet it is clear that violence is at the core of Doogan's Punch and Judy images like her 1984 triptych Punch Ponders His Role And Wonders If ‘Bad’ Is Still Charming; On the Other Hand, Judy Maintains Her Sense of Humor. In the image, a battered Judy lies naked on the ground waving the shadow of her hand, and Hector, the horse, is exhaling his last breath. The artist herself revealed a sense of irony in the image as the words “Left For Dead” are scratched in the surface and accompanied by an arrow pointing left. Doogan sold all of the works in her Punch and Judy series, and she attributed its popularity to the way that stylization (the cartoonish rendering and bright colors) mitigates the violence of the story of “the charming rogue.” Reich characterizes her early work with its bright colors and abstraction as expressionist. Although Doogan's style changes radically, her use of multiple panels and language as well as her interest in society's perception of women and male/female relationships carry through to her later work.

== Later work ==
LILY (Lie/Lay) mixed-media drawing, 1989. Charcoal, aluminum dust, dry pigment, collage on primed paper diptych (each panel 72” x 50”, overall 72” x 100”) by Bailey Doogan. In LILY (Lie/Lay), Doogan uses her subtractive technique of drawing with sandpaper on the charcoal surface of gesso-primed paper. This image of a supine, aging woman complete with wrinkles and sagging flesh runs counter to the Western tradition of presenting the “nude” as a beautiful, young woman. This work, like many of Doogan's other later works, challenges the idea of the equation of youth with beauty.

According to Doogan, her body of large charcoals began in 1988 with a response to one of her student's story about an argument she had with a group of male friends who said that Doogan wasn't a good artist but that she was “an angry aging bitch.” Instead just getting angry about having her work judged based on her disposition, age and sex rather than on her artistic skill, Doogan created RIB (Angry Aging Bitch), a large, three-panel piece (with a total dimension of 72” x 150”) with three, nude, life-size self-portraits. The panels are topped with the words “Angry Aging Bitch,” and the letters R-I-B are highlighted in red in a Biblical reference to Eve's creation from Adam's rib. The women are all standing, and their bodies are rendered with the wrinkles and sagging flesh of middle age. Doogan developed a technique in “RIB” that she continued to use for her charcoal drawings. She covered paper with multiple layers of gesso and then rubbed charcoal over the gesso. In a subtractive process, she “drew” on the charcoal surface by sanding away the darkness and bringing up the lighter tones with the sandpaper. Doogan's charcoal drawings have been compared to photo-realist paintings and photographs as a result of their technical acumen and tonal subtleties. Yet the realism of many of Doogan's figures is highlighted by the contrast between the figures and the subtly blurred backgrounds that are created by Doogan's use of sfumato (Italian for fumes or smoke), a technique that was developed in the Italian Renaissance and is best known for its use in Leonardo da Vinci's Mona Lisa. Doogan's 1989 work LILY (Lie/Lay) illustrates the realistic detailing that Doogan achieves in the woman's skin through the sandpaper-on-charcoal technique combined with a softened background that is characteristic of sfumato. Yet in LILY (Lie/Lay), the blurred background is broken up by a small rendering of another reclining woman. The piece also uses words and plays with language, specifically grammar, hallmarks of Doogan's work.

While Doogan was working on her large-scale charcoal drawings, she also was executing and exhibiting oil paintings, often at a life-size scale and in a multi-panel presentation. To create her realistic oil paintings of the body in all of its aging details, Doogan used impasto, a technique where paint is applied thickly and built up in layers, sometimes with a palette knife rather than a paint brush. The result is a three-dimensional quality that allowed Doogan to mimic the aging body in all of its details: wrinkles, bruises, varicose veins and sagging skin. Yet Doogan also added glazes to her paint, which creates a luminosity that animates the figures. In her 1992 oil painting Mea Corpa, Doogan's combination of impasto and glazes creates a woman that Margaret Regan describes as “glorious in her flesh; her muscles and veins are visible beneath her nearly transparent skin, painted in a series of thin, luminous layers.” The work also reflects Doogan's Catholic background. The posture of the female figure, which was based on a friend of Doogan's who developed muscular dystrophy, resembles the risen Christ. The painting's name Mea Corpa is a feminization of the Latin phrase from the Catholic mass “corpus meus” (the masculine form of “my body”). The title also refers to another phrase from the Catholic mass: mea culpa (Latin for “my fault”).

Mea Corpa, 1992. Oil on linen (72" x 48") by Bailey Doogan. This work illustrates the prime techniques of the artist's later paintings in its combination of impasto and glazes. The work also reflects Doogan's Catholic background. The posture of the female figure, which was based on a friend of Doogan's who developed muscular dystrophy, resembles the risen Christ. The painting's Latin name Mea Corpa also references phrases in the Catholic mass.

Doogan's artworks have been compared repeatedly to some of the most skilled painters in the Western tradition, including Rembrandt and Thomas Eakins. As Deborah Sussman Susser says in Art in America, “In her masterful, unsettling oil paintings and larger-than-life charcoal studies, Doogan approaches the body with a spirit of discovery and a technical prowess reminiscent of such 19th-century masters as Thomas Eakins.” Although Doogan's figurative oil paintings are rendered realistically, there is such an emotive quality to the faces and gestures that May Stevens has named Doogan a "realist/feminist/expressionist/language-oriented artist."

For the ancient Greeks and the Western artists who have followed in their tradition, the “nude” as a genre depicts female and male forms as idealized objects of beauty that are divorced from the realities of physical bodies. Yet as Stevens writes, “Her [Doogan’s] bodies are never nudes. They are always naked.” Instead of working in the classical tradition, Doogan's vision of the female body developed out of the 1970s movement of feminist artists who sought to create a vision of women's bodies that was vested in their own experiences rather than in the male gaze. As a consequence, Doogan didn't see the physical signs of age revealed in the naked body as imperfections because, as she said, "For me, skin is beautiful because it is a luminous diary of experience." “Doogan’s tenderness for our aging bodies is almost unique in art,” according to Lucy Lippard, and she adds, “Her fierce devotion to the human body can only open our eyes to its drama. She sees our souls through our bodies.”

== Censorship ==
Not everyone has embraced Doogan's vision or her artworks. Some of her works have provoked anger and controversy, even in the art world. As a consequence, Doogan was censored many times in various ways, including having individual works pulled from an exhibition, a museum purchase rescinded when the museum's board of directors saw the artwork, an exhibition cancelled and a painting torn off a wall by a curator. The reason, according to art historian Mary D. Garrard, is that there is a taboo in Western society against depicting the bodies of older women because such images run counter to cultural norms that present beauty in terms of youth. Garrard says, “What it [such censorship] tells us is that images of women as older or ‘ugly’ are simply not acceptable to many in our society. There's a mandate at work, and Doogan is out to challenge it. This alone would make her deeply feminist work important.”

== Exhibitions ==
=== Selected one-person exhibitions ===
Information about the solo exhibitions from 1973–2005 is drawn from Bailey Doogan: Selected Works 1971–2005. Information about more recent exhibitions is cited individually.

- 1973: Drawings, Memorial Union Gallery at Arizona State University, Tempe, Arizona
- 1980–1983: Female Series, Harry Wood Gallery at Arizona State University, Tempe, Arizona; Joseph Gross Gallery at University of Arizona, Tucson, Arizona; Fresno Art Museum, Fresno, California
- 1983–1985: Articulate, Elaine Starkman Gallery, New York, New York; University of Arizona Museum of Art, Tucson, Arizona; Dinnerware Artists’ Cooperative Gallery, Tucson, Arizona; Idaho Art Center at University of Idaho, Moscow, Idaho
- 1985: Punch & Judy, Scottsdale Center for the Arts, Scottsdale, Arizona; Dinnerware Artists’ Cooperative Gallery, Tucson, Arizona
- 1988: Self Portrait Diary, Visual Arts Gallery at Pensacola College, Pensacola, Florida
- 1989: Context and St. Lucy/Oedipus, Etherton Stern Gallery, Tucson, Arizona
- 1990: Chairwoman, Cerro Cosa College, Ridgecrest, California
- 1991–2004: Six solo exhibitions of paintings, prints, large drawings and/or small paintings with etched glass, Etherton Gallery, Tucson, Arizona
- 1991/1992: Artists of Conscience series, Alternative Museum, New York, New York
- 1992: Large drawings, The Irish Arts Center, New York, New York
- 1992–1993: Mea Corpa, Alternative Museum, New York, New York; Sheppard Fine Arts Center at University of Nevada, Reno, Nevada; Donna Beam Fine Art Gallery at University of Nevada, Las Vegas, Nevada; Etherton Stern Gallery, Tucson, Arizona
- 1998: A Survey of Drawings, 1988–1999, University of Arizona Museum of Art, Tucson, Arizona
- 2000: Positions, Dana Women Artists Series, Rutgers University, Rutgers, New Jersey; Rowe Arts Main Gallery at University of North Carolina, Charlotte, North Carolina
- 2005/2006: Bailey Doogan: Selected Works 1971–1998, Tucson Museum of Art, Tucson, Arizona held concurrently with Bailey Doogan: Selected Works 1993–2005, Etherton Gallery, Tucson, Arizona
- 2009: Translations, Etherton Gallery, Tucson, Arizona
- 2014: Spill (collaboration with Ann Simmons-Myers), Etherton Gallery, Tucson, Arizona
- 2026: Close to the Bone, Etherton Gallery, Tucson, Arizona
- 2026: Ways of Seeing, University of Arizona Museum of Art, Tucson, Arizona

=== Selected group exhibitions ===
Information about the group exhibitions from 1977 to 2005 is drawn from the catalog Bailey Doogan: Selected Works 1971–2005. Information about more recent exhibitions is cited individually.

- 1977–1979: Contemporary Issues: Works on Paper by Women, Woman's Building, Los Angeles, California; Sarah Blaffer Campbell Gallery, Houston, Texas; Utah Museum of Fine Arts, Salt Lake City, Utah.
- 1979: New Talent Exhibition, Marian Locks Gallery, Philadelphia, Pennsylvania
- 1982/1984/1986: Arizona Biennial 1982, Arizona Biennial 1984 and Arizona Biennial 1986, Tucson Museum of Art, Tucson, Arizona
- 1987: Artistas en Residencia, Galeria Principal, Altos de Chavon, Dominican Republic
- 1987: Women Artists, The Tyrone Gutherie Centre, Annaghmakerrig, New Bliss, Ireland
- 1989: Gallery Artists, Jayne H. Baum Gallery, New York, New York
- 1989/1990: American Women Artists: The 20th Century, Knoxville Museum of Art, Knoxville, Tennessee
- 1990: American Women Artists, Queensboro College Gallery, Bronxville, NY
- 1991: Forces of Eire, The Irish Arts Centre, New York, New York
- 1991/1992: Artists of Conscience: 16 Years of Social and Political Commentary, Alternative Museum, New York, New York
- 1993: Exquisite Corpse, The Drawing Center, New York, New York
- 1995/1996: Made to Order: America’s Most Wanted Paintings, Alternative Museum, New York, New York
- 1997/1998: Signs of Age: Representing the Older Body, Santa Barbara Contemporary Forum, Santa Barbara, California
- 2000: Picturing the Modern Amazon, The New Museum of Contemporary Art, New York, New York
- 2001: 9/11/01, Anton Gallery, Washington, District of Columbia
- 2003: Guest List, Gescheidle Gallery, Chicago, Illinois
- 2007: Eccentric Bodies, Mason Gross School of the Arts Galleries at Rutgers University, New Brunswick, New Jersey
- 2008/2009: Burning Down the House: Building a Feminist Art Collection, Elizabeth A. Sackler Center for Feminist Art at the Brooklyn Museum, Brooklyn, New York
- 2010: Made in Tucson/Born in Tucson/Live in Tucson, Part 1, Museum of Contemporary Art, Tucson, Arizona
- 2014: A Show of Hands, Tucson Museum of Art, Tucson, Arizona
- 2019: Face to Face: Self Portraits Before Selfies, Museum of Texas Tech University, Lubbock, Texas
- 2020: Of the Flesh, Davis Dominguez Gallery, Tucson, Arizona
- 2020/2021: Unapologetic: All Women, All Year, Scottsdale Museum of Art, Scottsdale, Arizona
- 2023: Can You See Me Now? Painting the Aging Body, Ryan Lee Gallery, New York, NY
- 2024: Portraits, Louis Carlos Bernal Gallery at Pima Community College, Tucson, Arizona
- 2024: The Vault Show: New Acquisition, University of Arizona Museum of Art, Tucson, Arizona
- 2025: The Skin We Live In: Miguel Casco and Ramon Sammiquel with Artists from the Collections of Dan Leach and Douglas Nielsen, Pima Community College/Pima Arts, Tucson, Arizona
- 2026: Humanist Touch: Works from the Weber Collection, American University Museum, Washington, DC

== Film festivals and screenings ==
=== Selected film festivals and screenings ===
Doogan's animated film SCREW: A Technical Love Poem won a Cinema Guild Award from the Ann Arbor Film Festival and was shown worldwide:

- 1977: Poetry Film Festival, San Francisco, California, toured the United States and Europe
- 1977: Experimental Film Festival, Nyon, Switzerland
- 1977: Film Forum at the Science Fiction Film Festival, New York, New York
- 1978: Filmmakers Exposition Festival, Brooklyn Museum, Brooklyn, New York
- 1979: The Hirshhorn National Museum of Modern Art, Washington, District of Columbia
- 1979: The 5th Annual Center Screen's Animation Series, Harvard Film Center, Cambridge, Massachusetts
- 1979: The American Film Festival, New York, New York
- 1979: The Ann Arbor Film Festival, Ann Arbor, Michigan
- 1979: Women Artists Filmmakers Festival, Global Village, New York, New York
- 1979: The Venice Biannale, Mostra Internazionale del Cinema, Venice, Italy
- 1979: The 20th Annual Adelaide International Film Festival, Adelaide, Australia
- 1980: International Festival of Women's Films, Copenhagen, Denmark
- 1983: Cambridge Animation Festival, Cambridge, England

== Books and catalogs ==
- 2005: Bailey Doogan: Selected Works 1971-2005, Etherton Gallery, Tucson, Arizona.
- 2025: Luminous Bodies: The Art of Bailey Doogan, Moira Doogan, n.p.
