= Bailey, Missouri =

Unincorporated community in Missouri, U.S.

Coordinates: 38°13′30″N 90°25′53″W

Bailey is an unincorporated community in Jefferson County, in the U.S. state of Missouri.

== History ==
Variant names were "Bailey Station" and "Hanover". A post office called Bailey's Station was established in 1861, the name was changed to Hanover in 1864, and the post office closed in 1885. The present name honors John Martin Bailey, an early settler.
