= St Mary's Church, Thatcham =

Coordinates: 51°24′6.27″N 1°15′32.78″W

St Mary's Church
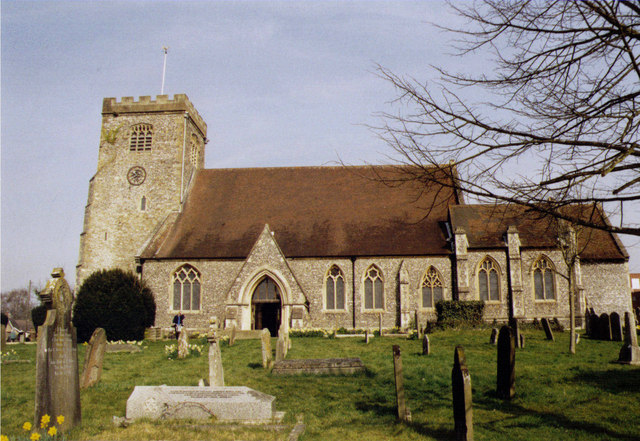
- A view across the graveyard
- St Mary's Church
- Location: Church Gate; Thatcham; Berkshire
- Country: England
- Denomination: Church of England

History
- Founded: 1140
- Dedication: St Mary

Architecture
- Functional status: Active
- Heritage designation: Grade II*
- Designated: 6 April 1967
- Style: Norman

Administration
- Diocese: Oxford
- Archdeaconry: Berkshire
- Parish: Thatcham

The St Mary's Church is a Church of England parish church at Thatcham in the English county of Berkshire. It is dedicated to the Virgin Mary and is a Grade II* listed building.

It has been claimed that the church was founded in the 7th century by St Birinus, and parts of the church date from the 12th century.

== Tower and bells ==
The tower contains a peal of 10 change ringing bells. The oldest bells (5th–9th) date from 1624 and were cast by Ellis I Knight of Reading. The newest bells (1 and 2) date from 1969 and were cast by John Taylor & Co. The tenor bell (cast in 1825) weighs 13-0-23 (671 kg) and rings out the note 'F'. The bell ringers practise on a Tuesday night from 7:30 pm till 9:15 pm. They also ring on a Sunday from 9:15 am till 10 am.

Treble: 3cwt, John Taylor 1969 in A

2nd: 3cwt, John Taylor 1969 in G

3rd: 4cwt, John Taylor 1929 in F

4th: 4cwt, John Taylor 1929 in E

5th: 5cwt, Ellis I Knight 1624 in D

6th: 6cwt, Ellis I Knight 1624 in C

7th: 6cwt, Ellis I Knight 1624 in Bb

8th: 7cwt, Ellis I Knight 1624 in A

9th: 10cwt, Ellis I Knight 1624 in G

Tenor: 13cwt, Thomas II Mears 1825 in F
