= Bailey Branch (Barren Fork tributary) =

Stream in Missouri, U.S.

Coordinates: 38°07′40″N 92°20′51″W

Bailey Branch is a stream in Miller County, the U.S. state of Missouri. It is a tributary of Barren Fork.

Bailey Branch has the name of R. B. Bailey, a pioneer citizen.

== See also ==
- List of rivers of Missouri
