= Bailey Park (Austin, Texas) =

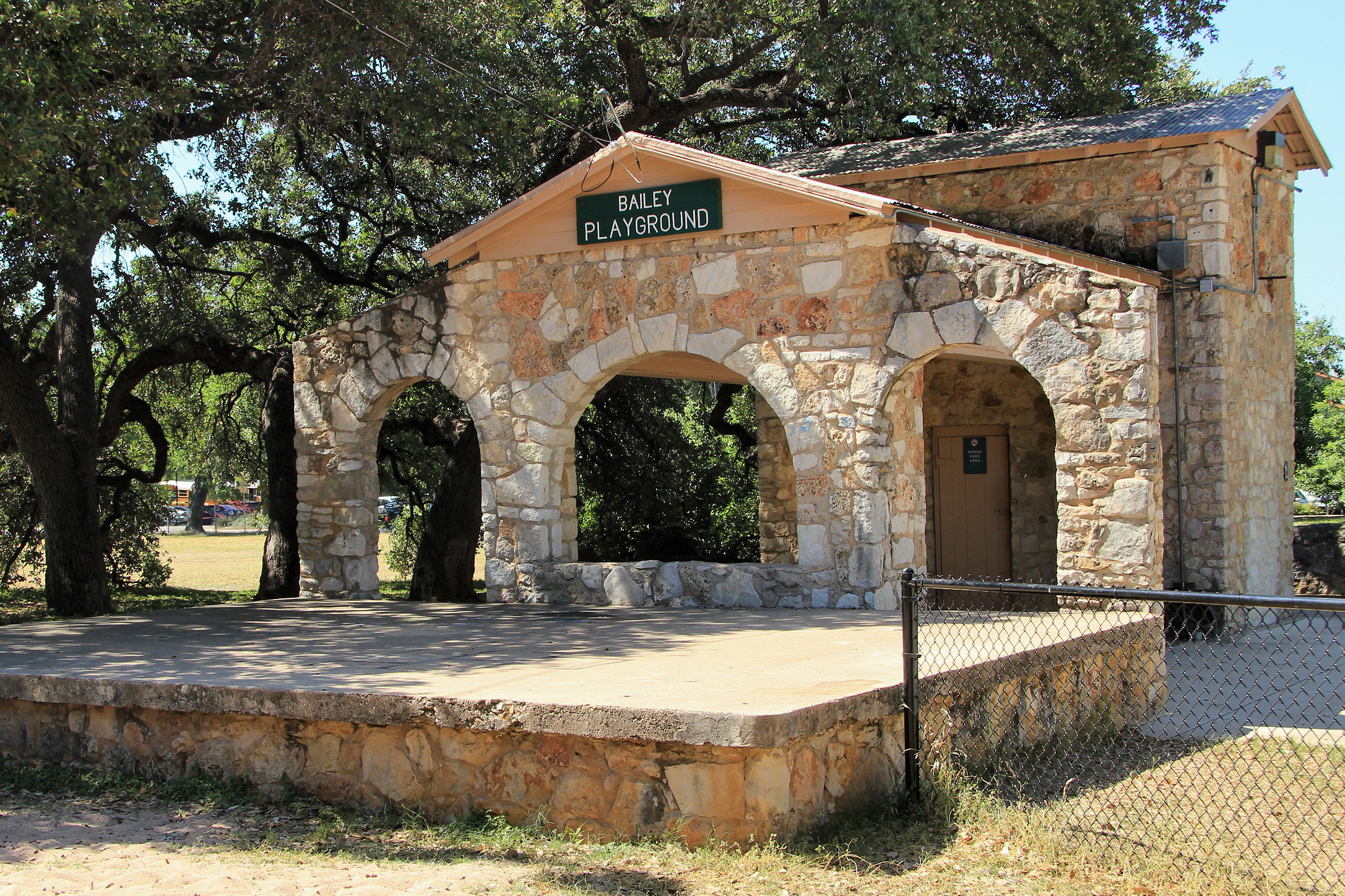
- The Bailey Park Shelter House was built in 1936.
- Interactive map of Bailey Park
- Location: Austin, Texas
- Area: 2.299 acres (0.930 ha)

Bailey Park is located in central Austin, Texas within the vicinity of the Seton Medical Center and St. Andrews Episcopal School. Located at 30°18′09″N 97°44′48″W, the small city park was created from several residential lots clustered together to make a common public green space. In 1935 F.G Rossener paid $320 in cash for lot #14 in the George W. Spears league of land. Bailey Park eventually expanded to cover 2.3 acres (9,300 m^{2}) or about one small city lot by the late 1930s.

At one time Bailey Park was central to the neighborhood east of Shoal Creek. Although the size of Bailey Park has not changed, the relative location has. Today Bailey Park is no longer bordered by residential lots and homes, rather the park is surrounded entirely by commercial property (hospital, a multistory office building etc.) and a private school. St. Andrew's Episcopal School lies between Bailey Park and the Shoal Creek Green Belt.

Bailey Park continues to see much use. Many people take advantage of what this little hidden park has to offer. Notable park features include a flagstone covered pavilion built in 1936, park swings, picnic benches, rest rooms, children's wading pool and a large field for softball. Facilities seeing the most use are outdoor tennis courts (with lights), a sand volleyball court (also with lights). A volleyball game occurs almost every evening throughout most of the year. Bailey Park also has a wide open space for flying kites, practicing soccer and other activities requiring a very large grassy area. In addition to the majestic oaks surrounding the pavilion, a wide variety of trees have been planted along the perimeter of Bailey Park.
