= Bailey Wollenweber =

German politician (born 2001)

Member of the Landtag of Rhineland-Palatinate
- Incumbent
- Assumed office 18 May 2026

Personal details
- Born: 21 May 2001 (age 24)
- Party: Alternative for Germany

Bailey Elisha Wollenweber (born 21 May 2001) is a German politician who was elected member of the Landtag of Rhineland-Palatinate in 2026. He has served as co-chairman of Generation Germany in Rhineland-Palatinate since 2025.
