= Bailey Rocks =

Chain of Rocks in Antarctic Windmill Islands

- Location within Antarctica

Geography
- Location: Antarctica
- Coordinates: 66°17′S 110°32′E
- Archipelago: Windmill Islands

Administration
- Administered under the Antarctic Treaty System

Demographics
- Population: Uninhabited

The Bailey Rocks are small chain of rocks in the Antarctic Windmill Islands which extends northeast from the north side of Bailey Peninsula into Newcomb Bay. They were first mapped from air photos taken by USN Operation Highjump, 1946–47, and observed in 1957 by Wilkes Station personnel under C. R. Eklund.

== See also ==
- Composite Antarctic Gazetteer
- List of Antarctic and sub-Antarctic islands
- List of Antarctic islands south of 60° S
- SCAR
- Territorial claims in Antarctica
