= Bayley =

Bayley may refer to:

- Bayley (wrestler) (born 1989), American professional wrestler
- Bayley Cooke (born 1963), English heavy metal singer
- Bayley Currey (born 1996), American professional stock car racing driver
- Bayley Feist (born 1997), American professional soccer player
- Bayley Fritsch (born 1996), Australian rules footballer
- Bayley Kuenzle (born 1998), Australian professional rugby union player
- Bayley Liu (born 1996), Scotland international rugby league footballer
- Bayley Simpson (born 1997), Canadian cyclist
- Bayley Sironen (born 1996), Australian professional rugby league footballer
- Bayley Wiggins (born 1998), New Zealand cricketer
- Bayley (surname)
- Bayley House
- Bayley Scales of Infant Development (BSID), used to sample the intellectual growth of infants and toddlers
- Bayley Seton Hospital

== See also ==
- Baley (disambiguation)
- Bayley Island
