= List of I Know Why the Caged Bird Sings characters =

I Know Why the Caged Bird Sings, the 1969 autobiography about the early years of African-American writer and poet Maya Angelou, features many characters, including Angelou as a child, whom she has called "the Maya character". The first in a seven-volume series, Caged Bird is a coming-of-age story that illustrates how strength of character and a love of literature can help overcome racism and trauma. The book begins when three-year-old Maya and her older brother are sent to Stamps, Arkansas, to live with their grandmother, and ends when Maya becomes a mother at the age of 16. In the course of Caged Bird, Maya transforms from a victim of racism into a self-possessed, dignified young woman capable of responding to prejudice. Caged Bird has been categorized as an autobiography, but Angelou utilizes fiction-writing techniques such as dialogue, thematic development, and characterization. She uses the first-person narrative voice customary in autobiographies but also includes fiction-like elements, told from the perspective of a child who is "artfully recreated by an adult narrator". She uses two distinct voices, the adult writer and the child who is the focus of the book. Angelou reports that maintaining the distinction between herself and "the Maya character" is "damned difficult", but "very necessary". Scholar Liliane Arensberg suggests that Angelou "retaliates for the tongue-tied child's helpless pain" by using her adult irony and wit. Angelou recognizes that there are fictional aspects to her books – she tends to "diverge from the conventional notion of autobiography as truth". In a 1998 interview with journalist George Plimpton, Angelou discussed "the sometimes slippery notion of truth in nonfiction", stating, "Sometimes I make a diameter from a composite of three or four people, because the essence in only one person is not sufficiently strong to be written about".

== Primary characters ==
=== Marguerite Johnson ("Maya") ===
The main character, "an unlikely heroine", from whose perspective the story is told. She has been described as "a symbolic character for every black girl growing up in America". The book covers most of her childhood, from the age of three, when she and her older brother Bailey are sent to their grandmother in Stamps, Arkansas, until she was sixteen, when she gives birth to her son Clyde. Through the character of Maya, Angelou uses her own childhood to demonstrate how she was able to survive as a black child in a white-dominated world. Maya is resilient, highly intelligent, and loves literature. She goes from feeling shame about her race and appearance to feeling pride, in spite of experiences of racism and trauma. She is raped at the age of eight by her mother's boyfriend and responds by choosing not to speak for five years. She is brought out of her muteness by Mrs. Bertha Flowers, who introduces her to great literature.

=== Annie Henderson ("Momma") ===
Maya and Bailey's paternal grandmother, "a church-going, God-fearing woman whose store is the heart of black socializing in Stamps". She is the most important influence in Maya's life. Momma deals with racism by submitting to it without a struggle and by developing "a strategy of obedience", believing that doing anything differently would be unsafe. Momma is tall, over six feet, and very physically strong. She is wise, hard-working, and a good businesswoman. She is undemonstrative in her love for Maya but "uncompromising in that love". As Angelou writes, "A deep-brooding love hung over everything she touched". (Note: Momma Henderson, as described by Angelou in her third autobiography Singin' and Swingin' and Gettin' Merry Like Christmas (1976), died in 1953.)

=== Bailey Johnson Jr. ===
Maya's brother, Bailey, is a year older than she is. He has the most influence on Maya's childhood. "He is bright, clever, and good-spirited". He was often her strongest supporter and ally. Maya measures others by her small-framed brother, who was her hero and "Kingdom Come". Reviewer John McWhorter calls Bailey Maya's "intense little James Baldwin stand-in of a brother". Maya and Bailey have an intense bond, and enjoy their private world of jokes. She is strengthened by his love and support; he is the only one able to comfort her after her rape, and he becomes her voice when they return to Stamps. When he witnesses the murder of a black man by a group of white men, he is confused and unable to understand their hatred.

=== Uncle Willie ===
Maya and Bailey's uncle and Annie Henderson's son; he became disabled at the age of three when a babysitter dropped him. He walks with a cane. Early in Caged Bird, Momma hides him in a bin of potatoes and onions to avoid being detected by the Ku Klux Klan. He helps Momma run her store and shows Maya such kindness that she wishes he were her father. He is just as strict as Momma, however, beating Maya and Bailey after they disrupt a church service and threatening to burn her on a potbelly stove for not learning her multiplication tables.

=== Vivian Baxter Johnson ("Mother Dear") ===
Maya and Bailey's "glamorous if feckless mother". Maya is in awe of her beauty: she is "too beautiful to have children". Vivian captivates both her children, especially Bailey, with her worldliness and euphoria. Maya is emotionally separated from her mother. Angelou stated later in her life that she recognized that her mother had abandoned her and her brother, which meant that Vivian was "a terrible parent of young children". Vivian is concerned about providing for her children, but negligent towards them. When Maya becomes pregnant at the end of the book, Vivian accepts Maya and her child; the birth of her grandson creates a bond between mother and daughter. (Note: Vivian Baxter died in 1991.)

=== Bailey Johnson, Sr. ===
Maya and Bailey's "no-account daddy". He is tall and handsome, with a "smile as slick as brilliantine". He attempts to project importance but speaks haltingly. He is insensitive towards his children. As Lupton states, "He represents the absent father, the man who is not there for his children, literally and figuratively". Bailey, Sr. "has respect for neither morals nor money", but Maya is fascinated by his "ironic pretentiousness". He appears twice in Caged Bird, when he shows up in Stamps to drive his children to St. Louis, and when Maya visits him for a summer in San Diego.

=== Mr. Freeman ===
Vivian Baxter's boyfriend; he lives with Vivian and her family in St. Louis when Maya and Bailey are sent there to be with their mother. At first, he is a father figure for Maya, who is hungry for acceptance from a man. He takes advantage of this by raping her when she is eight years old and then threatens to kill Bailey if she tells anyone about it. Bailey encourages Maya to disclose what has happened, and Mr. Freeman goes to trial. He is sentenced to one year and one day, but is released anyway. Four days later, he is found murdered, probably by Maya's uncles. Maya is so devastated and traumatized that she chooses not to speak for five years. She reclaims her voice much later in the novel when Mrs. Flowers asks her to read one of her poems in public.

=== Mrs. Bertha Flowers ===
The "aristocrat of Stamps" and the town's "black intellectual", Mrs. Flowers is a "self-supporting, independent, graceful" Black woman. She is the first person to treat Maya as an individual, and teaches her about the relationship between Blacks and the larger society, as well as "the beauty and power of language". She gently nurses Maya out of her mutism by reading to her and by loaning her books that inspire Maya to speak again.

== Minor characters ==
There are a number of minor characters in Caged Bird, members of the Black and white communities in Stamps who fill out Maya's world and shape her influences and early experiences. Among the most notable are:

=== Sister Monroe ===
A member of the Black church in Stamps. She is not always able to attend services, but when she does, she shouts as loudly as possible to make up for her absences. Many humorous church-related anecdotes focus on her and her behavior. Also, one of the most comical chapters in the book.

=== Reverend Thomas ===
A "repulsive church official" who visits Stamps every three months. Maya and Bailey despise him because he is obese and never remembers their names, and because he eats the best chicken pieces at Sunday dinner. One Sunday, Sister Monroe is so inspired by his preaching that she hits him over the head with her purse; his teeth fall out and onto the floor near Maya, which results in Maya and Bailey's uncontrollable laughter and subsequent beating by Uncle Willie.

=== Mr. McElroy ===
Momma's neighbor, and the only black man Maya has seen whose trousers match his jackets. She and Bailey admire him because he does not go to church, which makes him "a very courageous person".

=== "Powhitetrash" girls ===
Three white rural girls who attempt to humiliate and intimidate Momma in front of her store when they taunt and expose themselves to her. Momma reacts by passively humming a hymn, while Maya, watching from inside the store, weeps with shame and humiliation.

=== Dentist Lincoln ===
A white dentist who refuses to treat Maya's tooth pain, despite his debt to Momma incurred during the Great Depression. He states that he would rather put his "hand in a dog's mouth than in a nigger's." Momma reacts to this with passivity, while Maya is horrified and dreams up an elaborate fantasy about Momma threatening the racist dentist.

=== Mrs. Viola Cullinan ===
Maya's employer when she is ten years old. She insists on calling Maya "Margaret" instead of "Marguerite," and then, at the suggestion of a white friend, "Mary" (she already had a servant named Hallelujah, whom she called Glory). Maya is unable to tolerate this because "whites called black people too many other names", so Maya deliberately tries to get fired. She finally succeeds by breaking Mrs. Cullinan's prized china.

=== Mr. Donleavy ===
A white man, he is the guest speaker at Maya's eighth-grade graduation. He puts a pall over the ceremony and crushes the educational dreams of the audience by insinuating that black students are only capable of becoming athletes.

=== Henry Reed ===
The valedictorian of Maya's eighth-grade class. He makes up for Mr. Donleavy's discouragement by leading the audience in "Lift Ev'ry Voice and Sing", the "Negro national anthem."

=== Miss Kirwin ===
Maya's teacher at George Washington High School in San Francisco. "A rare educator", she is white but shows no favoritism to her students based upon their race. Angelou states that she is "the only teacher I remembered", and probably the only white person who befriended her.

=== Baxter Family ===
When Maya and Bailey are sent to live with their mother when they are eight and nine, they stay with her family in St. Louis. Grandmother Baxter, Vivian's mother, is a neighborhood precinct leader of German/black descent who has connections with the local police. Tutti, Tom, and Ira are Vivian's brothers; they allegedly murdered Mr. Freeman after he rapes Maya.

=== Dolores ===
Bailey Sr.'s pretentious girlfriend, who becomes jealous of Maya. After a violent argument, Maya runs away from her father's home and is homeless for a short while.

== Works cited ==
- Angelou, Maya (1969). I Know Why the Caged Bird Sings. New York: Random House. ISBN 0-375-50789-2.
- Arensberg, Liliane K. (1999). "Death as Metaphor for Self". In Braxton, Joanne M. (ed.). Maya Angelou's I Know Why the Caged Bird Sings: A Casebook. New York: Oxford Press. pp. 111–128. ISBN 0-19-511606-2.
- Gillespie, Marcia Ann; Butler, Rosa Johnson; Long, Richard A. (2008). Maya Angelou: A Glorious Celebration. New York: Random House. ISBN 978-0-385-51108-7.
- Lupton, Mary Jane (1998). Maya Angelou: A Critical Companion. Westport, Conneticut: Greenwood Press. ISBN 0-313-30325-8.
- McPherson, Dolly A. (1999). "Initiation and Self-Discovery". In Braxton, Joanne M. (ed.). Maya Angelou's I Know Why the Caged Bird Sings: A Casebook. New York: Oxford Press. pp. 21–48. ISBN 0-19-511606-2.
