= Peter Baillie =

British West Indies merchant and Whig politician (1771–1811)

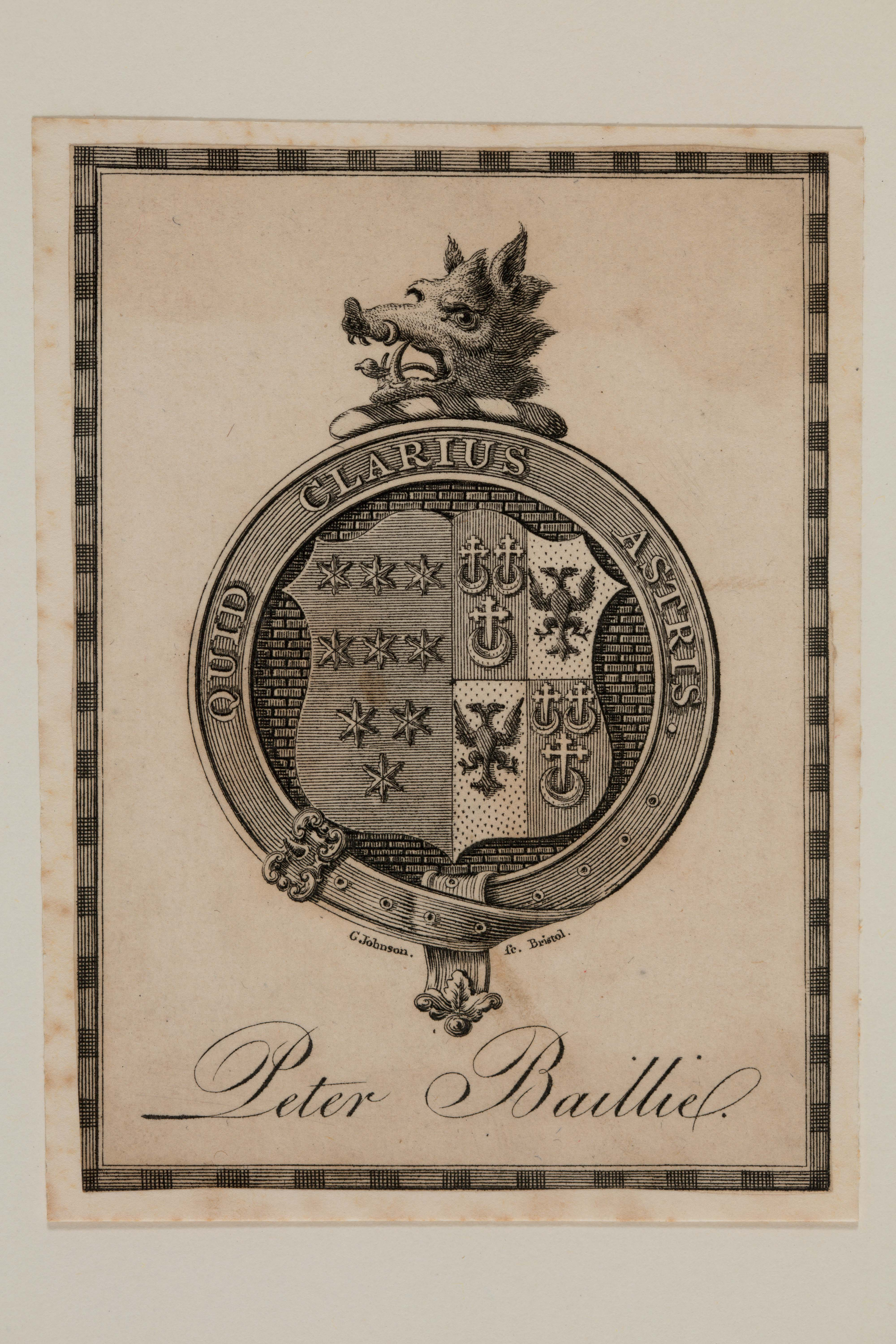
Ex libris (bookplate) of Peter Baillie c.1810

Peter Baillie (1771 – 1 September 1811) was a British West Indies merchant, and Whig politician who sat in the House of Commons from 1807 to 1811.

Baillie was the eldest son of Evan Baillie of Dochfour and his wife Mary Gurley, daughter of Peter Gurley of St. Vincent. His father was a landowner in Scotland with commercial interests in Bristol including the firm of Evan Baillie, Sons & Co. He was sent to France to compete education in July 1788. He joined his father in Bristol in the West India mercantile house and ran the business during his father's absence. He was an ensign in the Royal Bristol Volunteers in 1797 and captain in 1803. In 1806 became a partner in Bristol Old Bank.

In 1807 Baillie became Member of Parliament (MP) for Inverness Burghs. While his political intentions were unclear he declared a "fixed intention to give warm independent support to the Portland ministry". However he suffered illness and was unable to partake fully in parliamentary business. In May 1811 he made voyages to Ireland and Madeira for his health. He died on 1 September 1811 at the age of 40.

Baillie married Elizabeth Pinney, daughter of John Pinney West Indies merchant, on 9 May 1797. His brothers, Hugh Duncan Baillie and James Evan Baillie also served as MPs.

Parliament of the United Kingdom
Preceded by Francis William Grant	Member of Parliament for Inverness Burghs; 1807–1811	Succeeded by Charles Grant
