= Bailey Santistevan =

American sports coach (1901–1954)

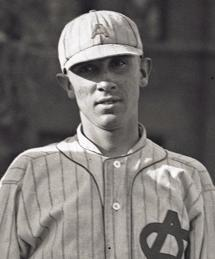
In the 1920s at Colorado State University

Bailey Joseph Santistevan Sr. (4 September 1901 in Las Animas, Colorado – 15 June 1954 in Copperton, Utah) was an American baseball and football coach. His parents were John (Juan) F. Santistevan and Teresina Hartt of Taos, New Mexico. He played semi-pro baseball. While playing in Bingham Canyon, Utah he was asked to coach sports for Bingham High School and ended with a 101-82-19 football record.

He created the Eskimo Pie league before Little League was formed as noted by John Schulian in his book, Twilight of the Long-ball Gods. Bailey was featured in the July 5, 1999 Sports Illustrated article Bailey's Boys. He was inducted into the American Legion Fall of Fame where he is considered one of the most successful coaches in American Legion Baseball.

He played baseball at and graduated from Colorado State University in the early 1920s.
