= Edmond Bailly (composer) =

French librarian and publisher

- Born: Henri-Edmond Limet; 19 June 1850; Lille
- Died: 8 September 1916 (aged 66); Paris
- Occupations: Composer; Publisher; Bookseller

Henri-Edmond Limet called Edmond Bailly (19 June 1850 – 8 September 1916) was a French and publisher and bookseller.

== Biography ==
Edmond Bailly was a musician and writer of symbolic, theosophical and esoteric inspiration. He wrote essays, narratives and articles on "esoteric music".

Established in October 1889, Bailly ran an occult bookshop known as the Independent Art Bookstore (Librairie de l'art independent) which was a central meeting place for artists, writers, and musicians in fin-de-siècle Paris. It was located in several places, most notably at 11 Rue de la Chaussée-d'Antin. Bailly published several magazines and took care of young authors. He became one of the animators of symbolism but also of the Theosophical Society. André Gide, Paul Claudel, Henri de Régnier, Pierre Louÿs, Louis-Nicolas Ménard began publishing their first works at the Librairie de l'Art Indépendant, which closed in 1917.

== Works ==
- 1888: Étude sur la vie et les œuvres de Friedrich Gottlieb Klopstock.
- 1887: Lumen, féerie chatoyante.
- 1900: Le son dans la nature.
- 1900: Le Pittoresque musical à l'Exposition.
- 1901: La musique et l'éducation sociale, in Congrès international de l'éducation sociale. I: Rapports présentés; II: Compte rendu des séances.
- 1903: L'Islamisme et son enseignement ésotérique.
- 1906: A propos de la résonance inférieure.
- 1909: La Légende de Diamant, sept récits du monde celtique.
- 1909: Libres Etudes: science, religion, art, philosophie, morale, sociologie, folklore.
- 1912: Le Chant des voyelles comme invocation aux dieux planétaires.

== Bibliography ==
- Frédéric Maget, Edmond Bailly et la Librairie de l’Art indépendant (1889–1917), mémoire de master, Centre d'histoire culturelle des sociétés contemporaines, Université de Versailles Saint-Quentin-en-Yvelines, 2006.
- Denis Herlin, "Le cercle de l’Art indépendant", in Debussy, La musique et les arts, catalogue of the exhibition Debussy at the musée de l’Orangerie (22 February - 11 June 2012), Musée d’Orsay/Skira/Flammarion, 2012, (pp. 76–89), (pp. 178–181).
- Denis Herlin, « À la Librairie de l’Art indépendant : musique, poésie, art et ésotérisme », Histoires littéraires, vol. XVII (n^{o} 68; October–December 2016), (pp. 7–56).
