= Solar eclipse of October 2, 1959 =

Total eclipse

- Total eclipse
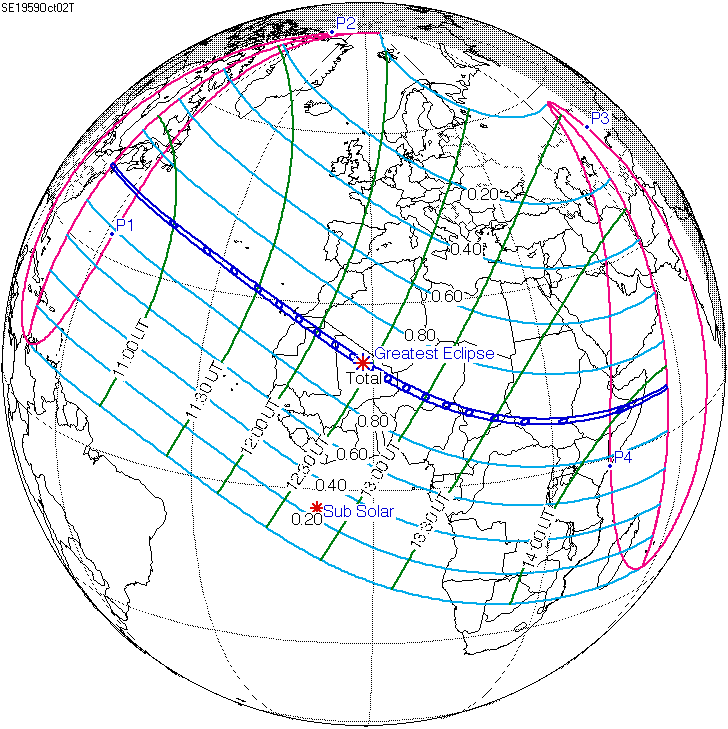
- Map
- Gamma: 0.4207
- Magnitude: 1.0325

Maximum eclipse
- Duration: 182 s (3 min 2 s)
- Coordinates: 20.4°N 1.4°W
- Max. width of band: 120 km (75 mi)

Times (UTC)
- Greatest eclipse: 12:27:00

References
- Saros: 143 (20 of 72)
- Catalog # (SE5000): 9419

A total solar eclipse occurred at the Moon's ascending node of orbit on Friday, October 2, 1959, with a magnitude of 1.0325. A solar eclipse occurs when the Moon passes between Earth and the Sun, thereby totally or partly obscuring the image of the Sun for a viewer on Earth. A total solar eclipse occurs when the Moon's apparent diameter is larger than the Sun's, blocking all direct sunlight, turning day into darkness. Totality occurs in a narrow path across Earth's surface, with the partial solar eclipse visible over a surrounding region thousands of kilometres wide. Occurring about 2.4 days before perigee (on October 4, 1959, at 21:10 UTC), the Moon's apparent diameter was larger.

Totality was visible from northeastern Massachusetts and the southern tip of New Hampshire in the United States, the Canary Islands, Morocco, Spanish Sahara (today's West Sahara) including the capital city Laayoune, French Mauritania (today's Mauritania), Mali Federation (part now belonging to Mali), French Niger (today's Niger), British Nigeria (today's Nigeria), British Cameroons and French Cameroons (now belonging to Cameroon), French Chad (today's Chad) including the capital city Fort-Lamy, French Central Africa (today's Central African Republic), Sudan (part of the path of totality is now in South Sudan), Ethiopia, and the Trust Territory of Somaliland (today's Somalia). A partial eclipse was visible for parts of eastern North America, the eastern Caribbean, Europe, Africa, West Asia, and Central Asia.

== Observations ==
Totality began over Boston, Massachusetts at sunrise. Viewing the eclipse was rained out, but it was reported that the brightening of the sky after the eclipse was a startling and impressive sight. A few photographers captured the eclipse from airplanes above the clouds, and a multiple exposure was made atop the R. C. A. building in New York City. The next total eclipse over Boston, the solar eclipse of May 1, 2079, will also be a sunrise event.

The event was also observed at the Canarian Island of Fuerteventura by a team of Dutch astronomers of the university of Utrecht and Amsterdam.

Maurice Allais, a French polymath, reported the alleged anomalous behavior of pendulums or gravimeters, later named as Allais effect. He first reported the effect after observing the solar eclipse of June 30, 1954, and reported another observation of the effect during this solar eclipse using the paraconical pendulum he invented.

== Eclipse details ==
Shown below are two tables displaying details about this particular solar eclipse. The first table outlines times at which the Moon's penumbra or umbra attains the specific parameter, and the second table describes various other parameters pertaining to this eclipse.

October 2, 1959 Solar Eclipse Times
Event	Time (UTC)
First Penumbral External Contact	1959 October 2 at 09:49:42.6 UTC
First Umbral External Contact	1959 October 2 at 10:50:25.8 UTC
First Central Line	1959 October 2 at 10:50:55.8 UTC
First Umbral Internal Contact	1959 October 2 at 10:51:25.7 UTC
First Penumbral Internal Contact	1959 October 2 at 12:08:39.3 UTC
Equatorial Conjunction	1959 October 2 at 12:12:52.0 UTC
Greatest Eclipse	1959 October 2 at 12:27:00.1 UTC
Greatest Duration	1959 October 2 at 12:29:26.6 UTC
Ecliptic Conjunction	1959 October 2 at 12:31:24.6 UTC
Last Penumbral Internal Contact	1959 October 2 at 12:45:44.7 UTC
Last Umbral Internal Contact	1959 October 2 at 14:02:42.2 UTC
Last Central Line	1959 October 2 at 14:03:14.3 UTC
Last Umbral External Contact	1959 October 2 at 14:03:46.4 UTC
Last Penumbral External Contact	1959 October 2 at 15:04:19.6 UTC

October 2, 1959 Solar Eclipse Parameters
Parameter	Value
Eclipse Magnitude	1.03251
Eclipse Obscuration	1.06608
Gamma	0.42075
Sun Right Ascension	12h31m27.3s
Sun Declination	-03°23'42.1"
Sun Semi-Diameter	15'58.8"
Sun Equatorial Horizontal Parallax	08.8"
Moon Right Ascension	12h31m57.6s
Moon Declination	-02°59'50.0"
Moon Semi-Diameter	16'15.2"
Moon Equatorial Horizontal Parallax	0°59'39.0"
ΔT	33.0 s

== Eclipse season ==
This eclipse is part of an eclipse season, a period, roughly every six months, when eclipses occur. Only two (or occasionally three) eclipse seasons occur each year, and each season lasts about 35 days and repeats just short of six months (173 days) later; thus two full eclipse seasons always occur each year. Either two or three eclipses happen each eclipse season. In the sequence below, each eclipse is separated by a fortnight.

Eclipse season of September–October 1959
September 17 Descending node (full moon)	October 2 Ascending node (new moon)
Penumbral lunar eclipse Lunar Saros 117	Total solar eclipse Solar Saros 143

== Related eclipses ==
=== Eclipses in 1959 ===
- A partial lunar eclipse on March 24.
- An annular solar eclipse on April 8.
- A penumbral lunar eclipse on September 17.
- A total solar eclipse on October 2.

=== Metonic ===
- Preceded by: Solar eclipse of December 14, 1955
- Followed by: Solar eclipse of July 20, 1963

=== Tzolkinex ===
- Preceded by: Solar eclipse of August 20, 1952
- Followed by: Solar eclipse of November 12, 1966

=== Half-Saros ===
- Preceded by: Lunar eclipse of September 26, 1950
- Followed by: Lunar eclipse of October 6, 1968

=== Tritos ===
- Preceded by: Solar eclipse of November 1, 1948
- Followed by: Solar eclipse of August 31, 1970

=== Solar Saros 143 ===
- Preceded by: Solar eclipse of September 21, 1941
- Followed by: Solar eclipse of October 12, 1977

=== Inex ===
- Preceded by: Solar eclipse of October 21, 1930
- Followed by: Solar eclipse of September 11, 1988

=== Triad ===
- Preceded by: Solar eclipse of November 30, 1872
- Followed by: Solar eclipse of August 2, 2046

=== Solar eclipses of 1957–1960 ===
This eclipse is a member of a semester series. An eclipse in a semester series of solar eclipses repeats approximately every 177 days and 4 hours (a semester) at alternating nodes of the Moon's orbit.

Solar eclipse series sets from 1957 to 1960
Descending node			Ascending node		
Saros	Map	Gamma	Saros	Map	Gamma
118	April 30, 1957 Annular (non-central)	0.9992	123	October 23, 1957 Total (non-central)	1.0022
128	April 19, 1958 Annular	0.275	133	October 12, 1958 Total	−0.2951
138	April 8, 1959 Annular	−0.4546	143	October 2, 1959 Total	0.4207
148	March 27, 1960 Partial	−1.1537	153	September 20, 1960 Partial	1.2057

=== Saros 143 ===
This eclipse is a part of Saros series 143, repeating every 18 years, 11 days, and containing 72 events. The series started with a partial solar eclipse on March 7, 1617. It contains total eclipses from June 24, 1797 through October 24, 1995; hybrid eclipses from November 3, 2013 through December 6, 2067; and annular eclipses from December 16, 2085 through September 16, 2536. The series ends at member 72 as a partial eclipse on April 23, 2897. Its eclipses are tabulated in three columns; every third eclipse in the same column is one exeligmos apart, so they all cast shadows over approximately the same parts of the Earth.

The longest duration of totality was produced by member 16 at 3 minutes, 50 seconds on August 19, 1887, and the longest duration of annularity will be produced by member 51 at 4 minutes, 54 seconds on September 6, 2518. All eclipses in this series occur at the Moon’s ascending node of orbit.

Series members 12–33 occur between 1801 and 2200:
12	13	14
July 6, 1815	July 17, 1833	July 28, 1851
15	16	17
August 7, 1869	August 19, 1887	August 30, 1905
18	19	20
September 10, 1923	September 21, 1941	October 2, 1959
21	22	23
October 12, 1977	October 24, 1995	November 3, 2013
24	25	26
November 14, 2031	November 25, 2049	December 6, 2067
27	28	29
December 16, 2085	December 29, 2103	January 8, 2122
30	31	32
January 20, 2140	January 30, 2158	February 10, 2176
33
February 21, 2194

=== Metonic series ===
The metonic series repeats eclipses every 19 years (6939.69 days), lasting about 5 cycles. Eclipses occur in nearly the same calendar date. In addition, the octon subseries repeats 1/5 of that or every 3.8 years (1387.94 days). All eclipses in this table occur at the Moon's ascending node.

22 eclipse events between December 13, 1898 and July 20, 1982
December 13–14	October 1–2	July 20–21	May 9	February 24–25
111	113	115	117	119
December 13, 1898		July 21, 1906	May 9, 1910	February 25, 1914
121	123	125	127	129
December 14, 1917	October 1, 1921	July 20, 1925	May 9, 1929	February 24, 1933
131	133	135	137	139
December 13, 1936	October 1, 1940	July 20, 1944	May 9, 1948	February 25, 1952
141	143	145	147	149
December 14, 1955	October 2, 1959	July 20, 1963	May 9, 1967	February 25, 1971
151	153	155		
December 13, 1974	October 2, 1978	July 20, 1982		

=== Tritos series ===
This eclipse is a part of a tritos cycle, repeating at alternating nodes every 135 synodic months (≈ 3986.63 days, or 11 years minus 1 month). Their appearance and longitude are irregular due to a lack of synchronization with the anomalistic month (period of perigee), but groupings of 3 tritos cycles (≈ 33 years minus 3 months) come close (≈ 434.044 anomalistic months), so eclipses are similar in these groupings.

The partial solar eclipses on December 18, 2188 (part of Saros 164) and November 18, 2199 (part of Saros 165) are also a part of this series but are not included in the table below.

Series members between 1801 and 2134
December 10, 1806 (Saros 129)	November 9, 1817 (Saros 130)	October 9, 1828 (Saros 131)	September 7, 1839 (Saros 132)	August 7, 1850 (Saros 133)
July 8, 1861 (Saros 134)	June 6, 1872 (Saros 135)	May 6, 1883 (Saros 136)	April 6, 1894 (Saros 137)	March 6, 1905 (Saros 138)
February 3, 1916 (Saros 139)	January 3, 1927 (Saros 140)	December 2, 1937 (Saros 141)	November 1, 1948 (Saros 142)	October 2, 1959 (Saros 143)
August 31, 1970 (Saros 144)	July 31, 1981 (Saros 145)	June 30, 1992 (Saros 146)	May 31, 2003 (Saros 147)	April 29, 2014 (Saros 148)
March 29, 2025 (Saros 149)	February 27, 2036 (Saros 150)	January 26, 2047 (Saros 151)	December 26, 2057 (Saros 152)	November 24, 2068 (Saros 153)
October 24, 2079 (Saros 154)	September 23, 2090 (Saros 155)	August 24, 2101 (Saros 156)	July 23, 2112 (Saros 157)	June 23, 2123 (Saros 158)
May 23, 2134 (Saros 159)

=== Inex series ===
This eclipse is a part of the long period inex cycle, repeating at alternating nodes, every 358 synodic months (≈ 10,571.95 days, or 29 years minus 20 days). Their appearance and longitude are irregular due to a lack of synchronization with the anomalistic month (period of perigee). However, groupings of 3 inex cycles (≈ 87 years minus 2 months) comes close (≈ 1,151.02 anomalistic months), so eclipses are similar in these groupings.

Series members between 1801 and 2200
January 10, 1815 (Saros 138)	December 21, 1843 (Saros 139)	November 30, 1872 (Saros 140)
November 11, 1901 (Saros 141)	October 21, 1930 (Saros 142)	October 2, 1959 (Saros 143)
September 11, 1988 (Saros 144)	August 21, 2017 (Saros 145)	August 2, 2046 (Saros 146)
July 13, 2075 (Saros 147)	June 22, 2104 (Saros 148)	June 3, 2133 (Saros 149)
May 14, 2162 (Saros 150)	April 23, 2191 (Saros 151)	

== See also ==
- List of solar eclipses visible from the United Kingdom 1000–2090 AD
