= Mildred Allen (physicist) =

American physicist

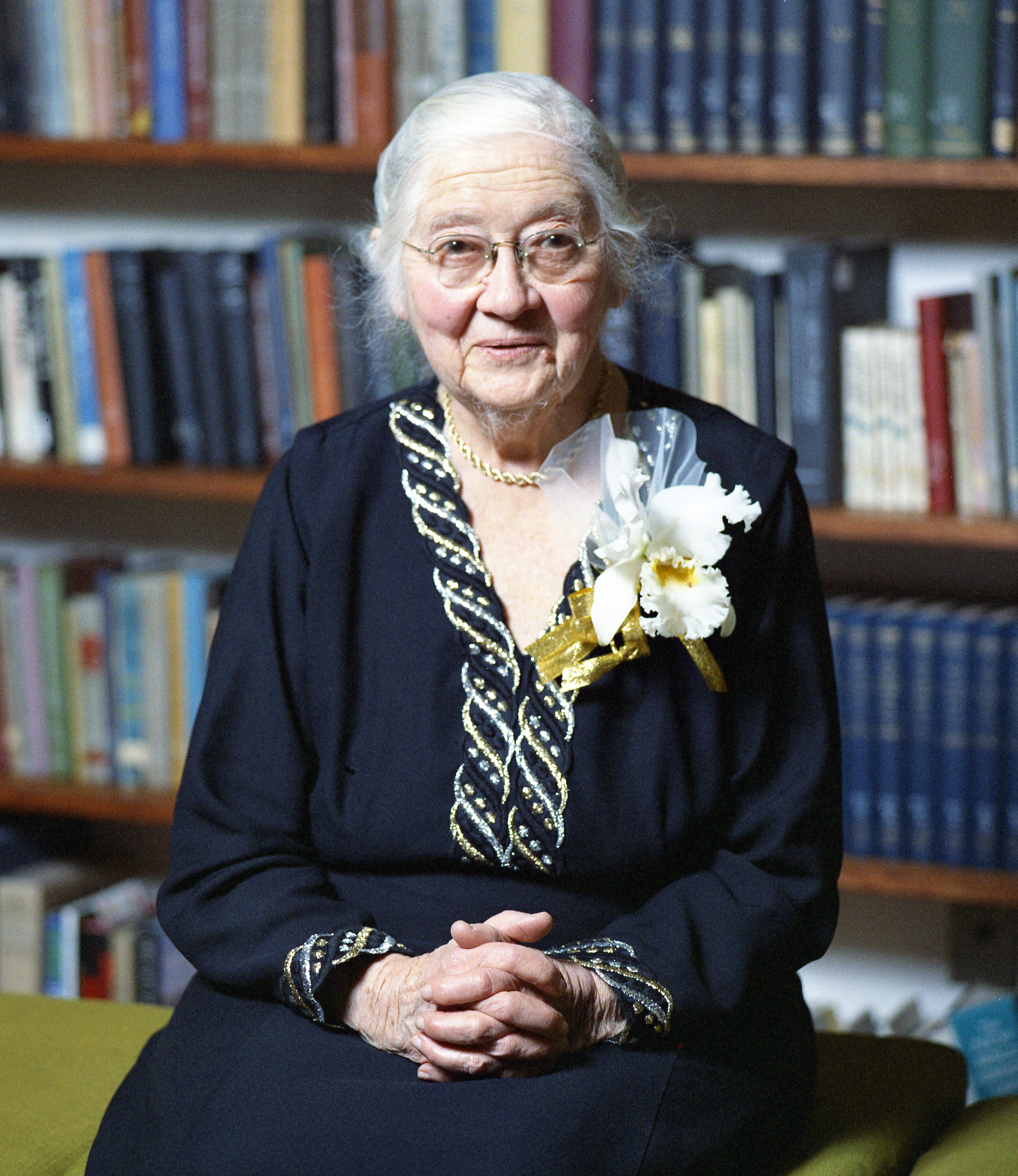
- Allen at her 80th birthday celebration at Mount Holyoke College (March 1974)
- Born: March 25, 1894; Sharon, Massachusetts
- Died: November 4, 1990 (aged 96); Holyoke, Massachusetts
- Education: Vassar College, Clark University
- Scientific career
- Fields: Physics
- Workplaces: Mount Holyoke College
- Thesis: On thermal emission and evaporation from water (1922)
- Doctoral advisor: Arthur Gordon Webster

Mildred Allen (March 25, 1894 – November 4, 1990) was an American physicist and professor. Her research interests included mechanics, electricity, heat, and optics. She worked primarily on the tension coefficients of resistance of single crystals, and thermal emission and evaporation from water.

== Biography ==
=== Early life and education ===
Mildred Allen was born in Sharon, Massachusetts to MIT professor of railroad engineering C. Frank Allen and Caroline Hadley Allen. She had one younger sister, Margaret Allen Anderson. A second younger sister died in early childhood. As a child, Mildred studied the piano and performed at social events. In high school, she opted for carpentry over cooking classes, and was interested in photography. She was very close to and corresponded extensively with her grandfather, Hiram Hadley, former teacher and president of the College of Agriculture and Mechanical Arts at Las Cruces, New Mexico, now New Mexico State University.

Allen graduated from Vassar College in 1916 with Phi Beta Kappa and Sigma Xi honors. She completed her master and doctoral studies in physics in 1916 and 1922, respectively, at Clark University with Arthur Gordon Webster, with thesis research done at Massachusetts Institute of Technology on the emissivity of water. She undertook post-doctoral work at the University of Chicago (1923), Yale University (1926-1927), and Harvard (1931-1933).

=== Career ===
Allen began her career as a visiting lecturer at Vassar College from 1916-1918, before teaching at Mount Holyoke from 1918-1920 and 1923-1926, with a period at Wellesley College in between (1921-1923). Between 1927 and 1930, she was a fellow at the Bartol Research Foundation under William Francis Gray Swann, whom she had met at Yale. She became a research instructor at Oberlin College in 1930, where she taught for one year. She returned to Mount Holyoke as an associate professor in 1933, where she taught for 31 years, including as full professor and chair of the department from 1946-1952, until her retirement as emerita professor in 1959. After her retirement, she returned to Oberlin as a lecturer in physics.

Allen continued her work in the field of theoretical mechanics after her retirement from teaching. For nearly 20 years, starting in the early 1960s, Allen collaborated with Erwin Saxl, an industrial physicist living in Harvard, Massachusetts, on experiments with a torsion pendulum. Allen and Saxl reported anomalous changes in the period of a torsion pendulum during a solar eclipse in 1970 and hypothesized that "gravitational theory needs to be modified". Their measurements, and similar anomalies earlier observed by Allais using a paraconical pendulum, have not been accepted by the physics community as in need of unconventional explanation, and subsequent experiments have not succeeded in reproducing the results.

Allen was an active member of the American Association of Physics Teachers, the American Association of University Women, the American Meteorological Society, the American Physical Society, especially the New England section, and the Optical Society of America. She died in 1990 at Holyoke Hospital in Holyoke, Massachusetts, at the age of 96.

== Awards and honors ==
- Fellow, American Association for the Advancement of Science (1930)
- Fellow, American Physical Society (1936)
