= Erwin Saxl =

- Born: May 7, 1904
- Died: January 28, 1981 (aged 76)
- Scientific career
- Fields: Physics

Erwin Joseph Saxl (May 7, 1904 – January 28, 1981) was a physicist and inventor. He was born in Vienna in 1904 and received his Ph.D. there in 1927. In the late 1920s he emigrated to the United States. In 1935 he founded the Saxl Instrument Company, which designed and manufactured tension meters for use in the textile industry, and later in other industries. The company, which Saxl ran jointly with his wife, Lucretia Hildreth Saxl, from their home in Harvard, Massachusetts, was renamed Tensitron in 1953. Saxl is reported as having stated that he worked under Albert Einstein. He died in 1981.

Saxl is most well known for a series of controversial experiments in which he measured unexpected changes in the period of a torsion pendulum under various conditions. In one series of experiments, the period of a torsion pendulum situated inside a Faraday cage, with the pendulum and the cage connected by a conducting path, was observed to increase as the voltage on the cage was increased. In another experiment, the period of the pendulum was seen to increase during an eclipse. Saxl is reported to have attempted, without success, to get this work published in the Physical Review; eventually the work was published in Nature.

In the early 1960s, Saxl began a collaboration with Mildred Allen of Mount Holyoke College. In 1971, Saxl and Allen published a report of anomalous changes in the period of a torsion pendulum during a solar eclipse in 1970 and hypothesized that "gravitational theory needs to be modified". In addition, they observed unexplained diurnal variation in the period of the pendulum. None of the effects observed by Saxl and Allen have obvious explanations in terms of well-established theories of gravity and electromagnetism. Although more subtle explanations, still using conventional physical theory, have been proffered there does not appear to be general agreement as to the cause of the anomalies. Saxl and Allen's claim that general relativity must be modified, and earlier claims of a similar nature by Allais based on observations of anomalies in the behaviour of a paraconical pendulum, have not won acceptance by the physics community, and recent attempts to reproduce the phenomena have not been successful.
