= Allais effect =

Alleged anomalous behavior of pendulums and gravimeters

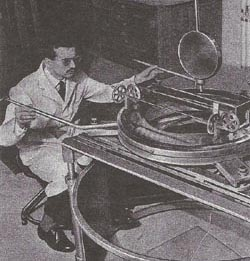
Allais' paraconical pendulum

Photo taken during the French 1999 eclipse

The Allais effect is the alleged anomalous behavior of pendulums or gravimeters which is sometimes purportedly observed during a solar eclipse. The effect was first reported as an anomalous precession of the plane of oscillation of a Foucault pendulum during the solar eclipse of June 30, 1954 by Maurice Allais, a French polymath who later won the Nobel Prize in Economics. Allais reported another observation of the effect during the solar eclipse of October 2, 1959 using the paraconical pendulum he invented. This study earned him the 1959 Galabert Prize of the French Astronautical Society and made him a laureate of the U.S. Gravity Research Foundation for his 1959 memoir on gravity. The veracity of the Allais effect remains controversial among the scientific community, as its testing has frequently met with inconsistent or ambiguous results over more than five decades of observation.

== Experimental observations ==
Maurice Allais emphasized the "dynamic character" of the effects he observed:

The observed effects are only seen when the pendulum is moving. They are not connected with the intensity of weight (gravimetry), but with the variation of weight (or of inertia) in the space swept by the pendulum. Actually, while the movement of the plane of oscillation of the pendulum is inexplicable by the theory of gravitation, the deviations from the vertical are explained perfectly by that theory. The deviations from the vertical […] correspond to a static phenomenon, while my experiments correspond to a dynamic phenomenon.

Besides Allais's own experiments, related research about a possible effect of the Moon's shielding, absorption or bending of the Sun's gravitational field during a solar eclipse have been conducted by scientists around the world. Some observations have yielded positive results, seemingly confirming that minute but detectable variations in the expected behavior of devices dependent on gravity do indeed occur within the umbra of an eclipse, but others have failed to detect any noticeable effect.

=== Anomalous results ===
Romanian physicist Gheorghe Jeverdan et al. observed the Allais effect and the so-called Jeverdan-Rusu-Antonescu effect or Jeverdan effect (i.e. the change in the oscillation period of a pendulum during an eclipse) while monitoring a Foucault pendulum during the solar eclipse of February 15, 1961. The authors made two hypotheses regarding their observation: during an eclipse, the Moon exerts a screening effect on the gravitational attraction of the Sun so that the attraction of the Earth is indirectly increased, a phenomenon that could also be studied with tides. If the hypothesis of the screening effect is wrong, another explanation could be that the variation of the Earth's gravity might be considered as a result of the diffraction of gravitational waves. Erwin Saxl and Mildred Allen similarly reported strong anomalous changes in the period of a torsion pendulum during the solar eclipse of March 7, 1970 and concluded that "gravitational theory needs to be modified".

Dr. Leonid Savrov of the Sternberg Astronomical Institute built a dedicated paraconical pendulum to test the Allais effect during the solar eclipse of July 11, 1991 in Mexico and the eclipse of November 3, 1994 in Brazil. While he could not observe Allais's claim that there is a diurnal periodicity in the motion of a paraconical pendulum, he did, however, write: "The most interesting result of the Mexico and Brazil experiments is the increase of rotational velocity of the pendulum oscillation plane in the direction of the Foucault effect during the eclipse. It seems that we have some kind of special effect."

Various other experiments using atomic clocks and gravimeters instead of pendulums also recorded significant anomalous gravitational effects which can neither be caused by a tidal effect or drift of the gravimeters, nor by high-frequency noise which has special patterns. These experiments were set up by different teams during solar eclipses in China in 1992, India in 1995, and China in 1997.

Results reporting the observation of the Allais and Jeverdan-Rusu-Antonescu effects during the annular solar eclipse of September 22, 2006 were presented the following year by a Romanian team, with a quantization of the behavior of the paraconical pendulum. During the solar eclipse of August 1, 2008, a Ukrainian team and two Romanian teams worked together hundreds of kilometers apart with different apparatuses: five independent miniature torsion balances for the Ukrainian team, two independent short ball-borne pendulums for a Romanian team and a long Foucault pendulum for the third team. All three teams detected unexplained and mutually correlated disturbances. The same teams repeated a dual experiment during the annular solar eclipse of January 26, 2009, this time outside of the umbra, with the same significant correlation between the behavior of light torsion balances and a Foucault pendulum. They also registered similar anomalies using a Foucault pendulum and a very light torsion balance, both located underground in a disused salt mine with minimal interference, during the partial solar eclipse of June 1, 2011.

=== Inconclusive or negative results ===
Louis B. Slichter, using a gravimeter during the solar eclipse of February 15, 1961 in Florence, Italy, failed to detect an associated gravitational signal.

During the solar eclipse of July 22, 1990, no anomalous period increase of a torsion pendulum was detected independently by a team in Finland and another team in Belomorsk, USSR.

The total solar eclipse of August 11, 1999 had been a good opportunity to solve a 45-year mystery, thanks to an international collaboration. NASA's Marshall Space Flight Center first inquired about experimental protocols to Maurice Allais, in order to coordinate ahead of the event a worldwide effort to test the Allais effect between observatories and universities over seven countries (United States, Austria, Germany, Italy, Australia, England and four sites in the United Arab Emirates). The lead supervisor then stated: "The initial interpretation of the record points to three possibilities: a systematic error, a local effect, or the unexplored. To eliminate the first two possibilities, we and several other observers will use different kinds of measuring instruments in a distributed global network of observing stations." However, after the eclipse, Allais criticized the experiments in his final NASA report, writing the period of observation was "much too short […] to detect anomalies properly". Moreover, the lead supervisor left NASA shortly thereafter with the gathered data and the NASA study has never been published.

Further observations conducted by the team led by Xin-She Yang appear to have yielded much weaker evidence of anomalies than their first 1997 study. The authors first posited a more conventional explanation based on temperature changes causing ground tilting, but later suggested that this explanation was unlikely. A possible yet controversial explanation was finally proposed by the same author and Tom Van Flandern which conjectured that the anomaly is due to the gravitational effect of an increased air density spot in the upper atmosphere created by cooling winds during the solar eclipse. They conclude there have been "no unambiguous detections [of an Allais effect] within the past 30 years when consciousness of the importance of [experimental] controls was more widespread." They point out that "the gravitation anomaly discussed here is about a factor of 100,000 too small to explain the Allais excess pendulum precession […] during eclipses" and from this conclude that the original Allais anomaly was merely due to poor controls.

Eight gravimeters and two pendulums were deployed across six monitoring sites in China for the solar eclipse of July 22, 2009. Although one of the scientists involved described in an interview having observed the Allais effect, no result has been published in any academic journal. An automated Foucault pendulum was also used during the solar eclipse of July 11, 2010 in Argentina, with no evidence of a precession change of the pendulum's oscillation plane (< 0.3 degree per hour).

== Aether hypothesis ==
Maurice Allais states that the eclipse effect is related to a gravitational anomaly that is inexplicable in the framework of the currently admitted theory of gravitation, without giving any explanation of his own. Allais's explanation for another anomaly (the lunisolar periodicity in variations of the azimuth of a pendulum) is that space evinces certain anisotropic characteristics, which he ascribes to motion through an aether which is partially entrained by planetary bodies.

His hypothesis leads to a speed of light dependent on the moving direction with respect to a terrestrial observer, since the Earth moves within the aether but the rotation of the Moon induces a "wind" of about 8 km/s. Thus Allais rejects Einstein's interpretation of the Michelson–Morley experiment and the subsequent verification experiments of Dayton Miller.

In particular, the Michelson–Morley experiment did not give a zero speed difference, but at most 8 km/s, without being able to detect any regularity. This difference was therefore interpreted as due to measurement uncertainties. Similarly, Miller's experiments corroborated these results over a long period of time, but Miller could not explain the source of the irregularities. At the time, temperature problems were invoked to explain the cause, as concluded by Robert S. Shankland. By re-analyzing the data from this experiment, Allais reported a periodicity using sidereal time rather than civil time used by Miller (daytime sidereal variation of the speed of light over a period of 23 hours 56 minutes with an amplitude of about 8 km/s).

Applying the Titius–Bode law to the Earth–Moon system, which he generalizes to aether, Allais calculates a "wind" of 7.95 km/s, which is comparable to the values found by the experiments of Michelson and Miller. Hence Allais deduces that the aether turns with the stars, as proposed by the aether drag hypothesis, and is not fixed as Hendrik Lorentz thought when inventing his famous transformation and his ether theory. But the majority of scientists at the end of the 19th century imagined that such an aether crossed the Earth so that the rotation of the Earth around the Sun would cause an important variation of 30 km/s. Consequently, since the third postulate on which special relativity is based is the constancy of the speed of light in vacuum, Allais considers it unfounded. In order to measure a change in the speed of light, one would have to get back to the definition of the 1960 meter, since confidence in the theory of relativity nowadays is such that current metrology uses constancy of the speed of light as an axiom.

Allais summarized his experimental work in English in his 1999 memoir on behalf of NASA. He detailed his aether hypothesis in the books L'Anisotropie de l'Espace, published in 1997, and L'Effondrement de la Théorie de la Relativité, published in 2004. A book on Allais's scientific legacy has been edited in English in 2011, yet his aether hypothesis has not gained significant traction among mainstream scientists. Nevertheless, after Allais's death in 2010, experiments on the Allais effect continue.

== See also ==
- N-rays
- Pioneer anomaly
