= Marcel Boiteux =

French economist, mathematician, and senior civil service member (1922–2023)

- Born: 9 May 1922; Niort, France
- Died: 6 September 2023 (aged 101); Croissy-sur-Seine
- Occupations: economist; mathematician; senior civil service

Marcel Boiteux (French pronunciation: [maʁsɛl bwatø]; 9 May 1922 – 6 September 2023) was a French economist, mathematician, and senior civil service member. He was the "architect of the French nuclear program" that created 61 nuclear reactors and kept the French electricity sector less carbon-intensive than other European countries.

Boiteux joined Électricité de France (EDF) in 1949 as a student of Maurice Allais and remained there for the rest of his career. In 1959, Marcel Boiteux became the President of the Econometric Society. From 1967 through 1987, he was the director of EDF. He theorized and implemented the price of electricity at marginal cost, and was one of the architects of France's nuclear industry development.

His journey illuminates a social environment (that of scientists and senior civil services), a research process (marginal cost), a large company and its strategy, public sector career and power mechanisms, State-public-company relations, and decision-making processes on important issues such as nuclear policy.

== Early life ==
Marcel Boiteux was born in Niort on 9 May 1922. He graduated from the Ecole Normale in 1942 and received his mathematics aggregation in 1946. In 1947, he also graduated, in the economics section, from the Institute of Political Studies in Paris.

== Career ==
His professional career began in 1946 when he entered the National Center for Scientific Research (CNRS), under the responsibility of Maurice Allais and having Gérard Debreu as a colleague.

Boiteux joined EDF on 1 April 1949 as an engineer in the sales department on Allais' recommendation.

Boiteux turned 100 on 9 May 2022, and died on 6 September 2023, at the age of 101.

== Recognition ==
On 14 December 1992, he was elected to the chair left vacant by Émile James' death in the Academy of Moral and Political Sciences.

== Works ==
- Boiteux, Marcel (January 1956). "Sur la Gestation des Monopoles Publics astreints a l'equilibre budgetaire" (PDF). Econometrica. 24 (1): 22–40.
