= Paraconical pendulum =

Type of pendulum invented in the 1950s

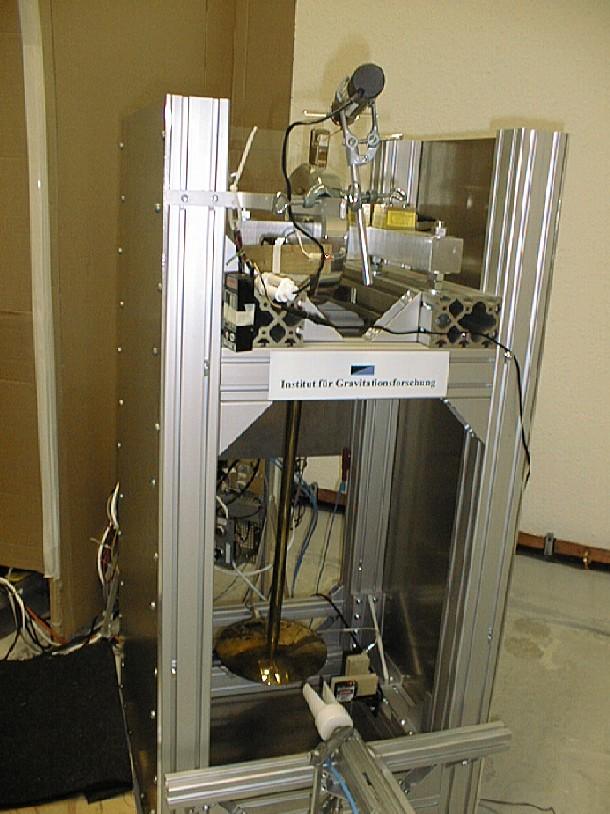
Modern Automated Paraconical Pendulum at Göde Wissenschafts Stiftung

The paraconical pendulum is a type of pendulum invented in the 1950s by Maurice Allais, a French researcher. During the 1950s, Maurice Allais conducted six marathon series of long-term observations, during each of which his team operated and monitored his pendulum manually non-stop over about a month. The objective was to investigate possible changes over time of the characteristics of the motion, hypothesized to yield information about asymmetries of inertial space (sometimes described as "aether flow").

== Characterization and experiments ==
The defining feature of the "paraconical" or "ball-borne" pendulum is that the pendulum's fulcrum is the changing point of contact between a spherical metal ball and a flat surface on which the ball rests. The pendulum therefore loses energy to rolling friction but not sliding friction, and is able to swing freely in both dimensions—both forward-to-backward and side-to-side—similar to an ordinary conical pendulum. The main difference between a paraconical pendulum and an ordinary conical pendulum is the size of the ball involved: shrinking the ball down to a point produces an ordinary conical pendulum.

Typically a paraconical pendulum is built as a solid body with a stiff rod, rather than with a flexible wire or cord. If an accurately spherical ball and an accurately planar flat are used, a paraconical pendulum is a highly sensitive instrument.

As with the conical Foucault pendulum, a paraconical pendulum will be affected by the rotation of the Earth; but the changing fulcrum point makes the behavior of this dynamical system rather more complex. As first noted by Allais, and now confirmed by modern researchers, its motion exhibits a 24.8-hour cyclic pattern.

== See also ==
- Allais effect, a claim asserted by Maurice Allais of anomalous behavior of his pendulum during a partial solar eclipse in 1954
- Double pendulum
