= Eclipse chasing =

Pursuit of eclipses for study and enjoyment

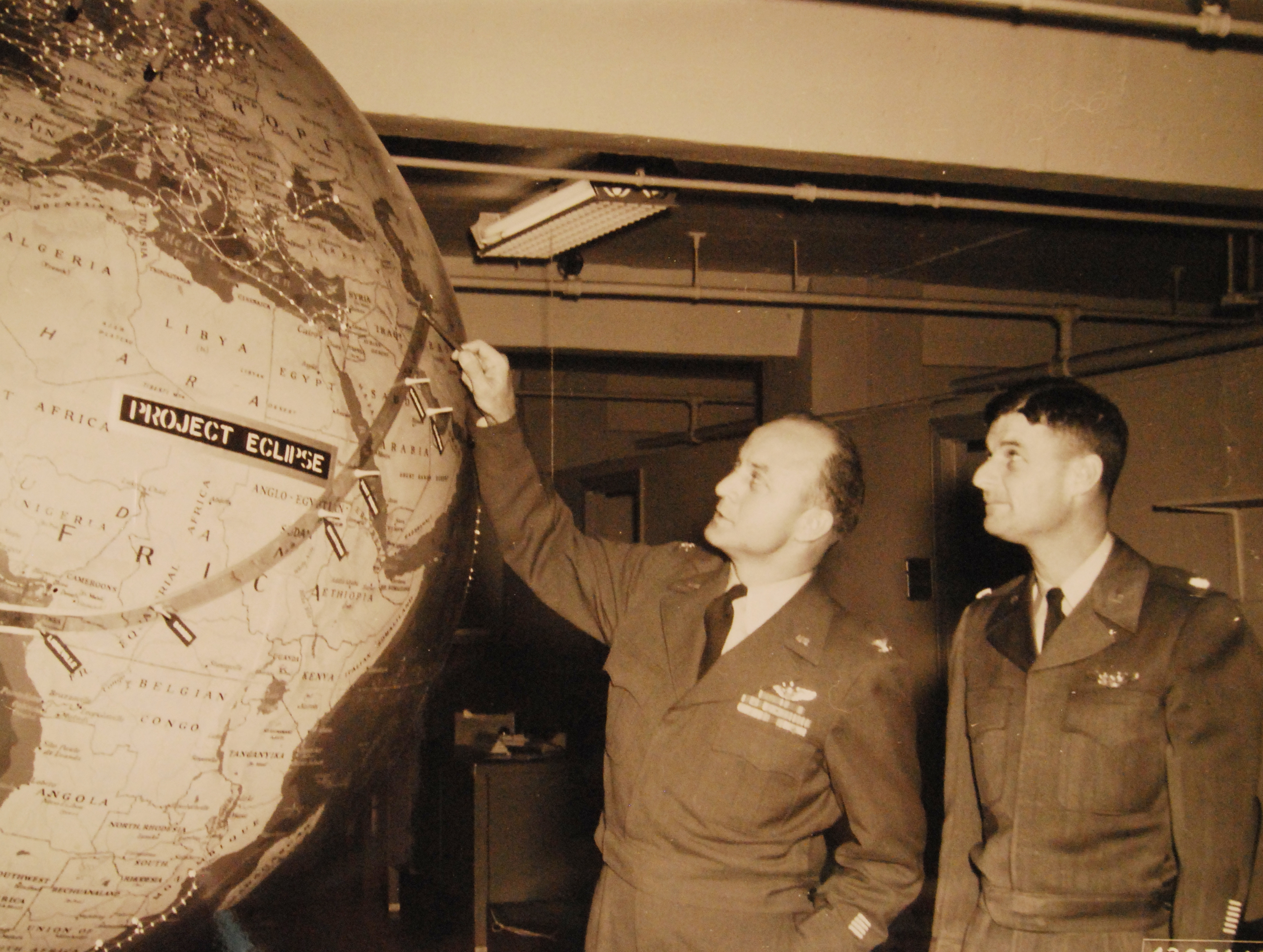
Two United States Air Force colonels inspecting the path of the eclipse of February 25, 1952, in preparation for an expedition to Africa.

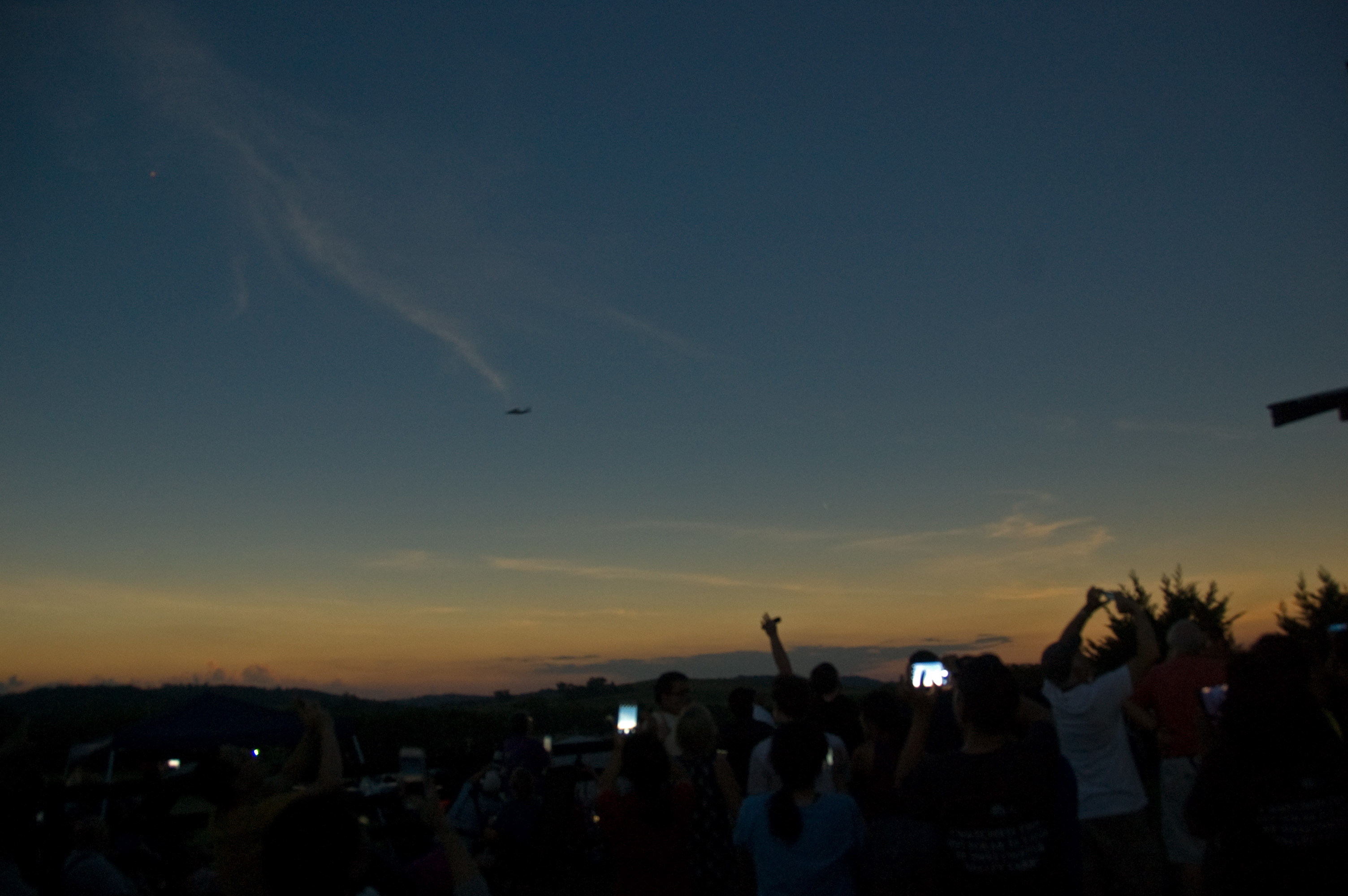
An airplane (center-left) chasing the eclipse of August 21, 2017, in Tennessee, United States

Eclipse chasing is the pursuit of observing solar eclipses when they occur around the Earth. Solar eclipses must occur at least twice and as often as five times a year across the Earth. Total eclipses may occur multiple times every few years.

A person who chases eclipses is known as an umbraphile, meaning shadow lover. Umbraphiles often travel for eclipses and use various tools to help view the Sun including solar viewers also known as eclipse glasses, as well as telescopes. Reasons for witnessing eclipses range from scientific study to emotional experiences.

== History ==
In the 19th century, Mabel Loomis Todd, an American editor and writer, and her husband David Peck Todd, a professor of astronomy at Amherst College, traveled around the world to view solar eclipses.

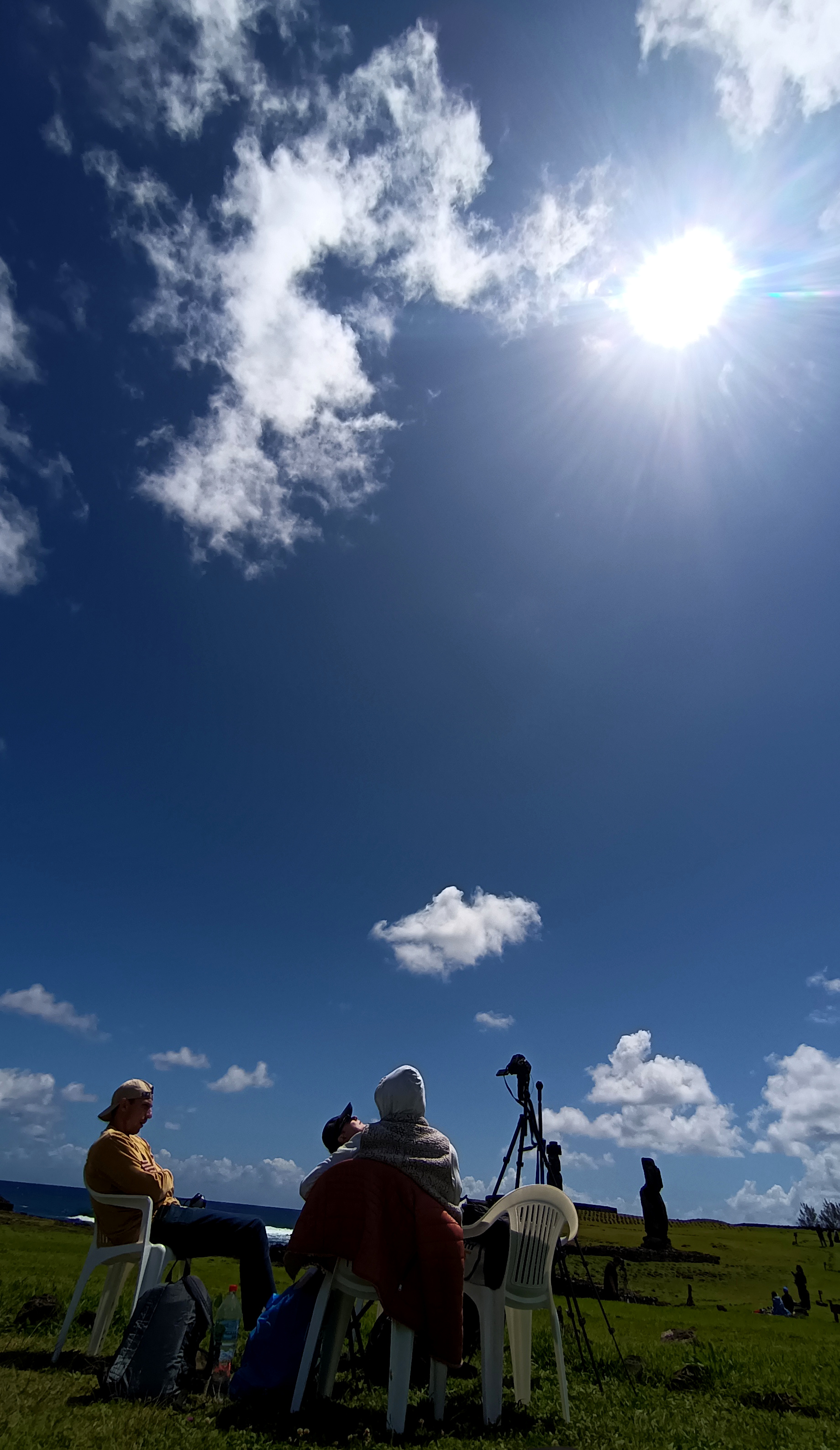
Eclipse chasers at Ahu Tahai, Hanga Roa, on Rapa Nui (Easter Island) observing the October 2024 Annular Eclipse

In 1923, US Navy tried to observe the solar eclipse of September 10 from sixteen planes, including Felixstowe F5L biplane, "to determine the centerline of the eclipse from air." No photo recorded the eclipse. Officer and photographer Albert William Stevens was one of the pilots on this expedition; he is sometimes called "the father of airborne astronomy". There was another attempt to observe a solar eclipse, this time from a dirigible. On 24 January 1925, U.S. Naval Observatory and U.S. Bureau of Standards gathered a group of astronomers to observe a total solar eclipse from the USS Los Angeles airship over the New York City, with Captain Edwin Taylor Pollock as a head of the group. They used "two pairs of telescopic cameras", to capture inner and outer portions of Sun's corona, and a spectrograph. The expedition achieved good publicity, but it was not very successful in its observations - the dirigible was not very stable and the photos were blurred. The next attempt was successful: an expedition of the Naval Observatory to observe the solar eclipse of April 28, 1930, on Honey Lake, California, with Vought 02U-1 plane equipped with a camera, recorded "the approach of the shadow".

Army Air Corps and the National Geographic Society organized another expedition in 1932, to observe the eclipse of August 31. Accompanied by Lieutenant Charles D. McAllister of the Army Air Corps, Stevens took the first photograph of the Moon's shadow projected onto the Earth during a solar eclipse.

Royal Canadian Air Force observed the solar eclipse of July 9, 1945, from four planes: "a Spitfire, a Mitchell, and two Ansons"; three planes used seven standard aerial photography cameras, "adjusted to automatically take exposures". For the solar eclipse of May 9, 1948, National Geographic society organized several ground stations and two backup planes for a case of bad weather. Two B-29s, stationed on the Aleutian Islands, successfully observed and photographed the eclipse.

For the solar eclipse of June 30, 1954, observations were made "from the open door of a special Lincoln aircraft". Photographs helped "to derive coronal brightness and polarization, along with sky brightness and polarization". Several missions were made in 1960s. Three NC-135 planes of the Los Alamos Scientific Laboratory (LASL) were used for eclipses observations from 1965 to 1980. The planes were operated by the Atomic Energy Commission.

Ten Minute Time Lapse Video of the Total Solar Eclipse on April 8, 2024, in Mazatlán, Mexico

In 1973, the French Concorde prototype, c/n 001, was modified with roof-top portholes for a solar eclipse observation mission of 30 June 1973, at the end of the French testing programme. Observational instruments were installed on board, and the aircraft flew across Africa for 74 minutes of totality. One of the scientists was Donald Liebenberg, who had previously flown on LASL's NC-135. The airplane is now at the Le Bourget Air and Space Museum on permanent display in eclipse livery, with the portholes displayed.

In 2024, it was estimated by US tourism officials that at least 4 to 5 million people traveled from various parts of the country to witness the eclipse along the path of totality. This made it the largest travel day of the year in the country, bringing an estimated economic boost of $1.5 billion.

== See also ==
- Solar eclipse
- Weather spotting
- Storm chasing
