= 1973 Concorde eclipse flight =

Longest total solar eclipse observation

- Date: June 30, 1973
- Location: Sahara
- Participants: Pierre Léna; André Turcat; Donald Liebenberg

On 30 June 1973, the supersonic jet Concorde 001 intercepted the path of a total solar eclipse and followed the path of totality as it crossed Africa. This feat allowed the passengers to experience a total solar eclipse for 74 minutes, the longest-ever total eclipse observation. Five experiments were carried out during the flight, but they have had limited scientific impact.

== Sequence of events ==
=== Preparation and lead up ===
In May 1972, Pierre Léna, an astronomer with the Paris Observatory, met with French Concorde test pilot André Turcat over lunch at a restaurant at Toulouse Airport to propose his idea to view the 1973 eclipse from an aircraft. Léna describes this meeting in his book about the project, Concorde 001 et l’ombre de la Lune (2015), while Turcat describes it in Un mythe éclipsé in Bulletin de l’Académie des sciences, agriculture, arts et belles lettres d’Aix-en-Provence (2013). British astrophysicist John Beckman had previously tried to obtain permission to use the 002 Concorde prototype to conduct a similar experiment, but was turned down.

In autumn 1972, Léna was told that he, Turcat and their teams could begin work, but that no firm decision would be made about the flight before February 1973. On 2 February, it was announced that the flight would proceed. The scientists were able to carry out a test flight with their equipment on 17 May 1973, in their maiden supersonic flight. The final 2-hour-and-36-minute rehearsal flight took place on 28 June.

=== 30 June 1973 ===
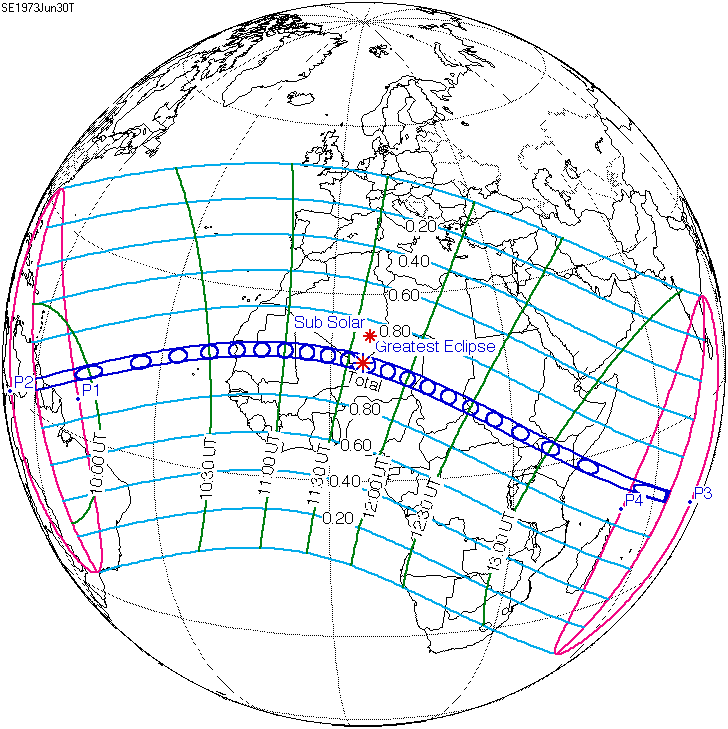
The path of totality of the eclipse

At 10:08 GMT on 30 June 1973, Concorde 001 departed Las Palmas, Gran Canaria, piloted by André Turcat and Jean Dabo. Aboard the flight were Turcat and Dabo; flight mechanic Michel Rétif; radio navigator Hubert Guyonnet; Henri Perrier; and astronomers Léna, Beckman, Donald Hall, Donald Liebenberg, Alain Soufflot, Paul Wraight, and Serge Koutchmy.

The plane intercepted the path of totality over Mauritania within one second of the planned rendezvous and flew at an altitude of 58,000 feet (18,000 m) at Mach 2. Mauritania closed its airspace to commercial air traffic to ensure the success of the Concorde's flight. The aircraft flew in the lunar shadow over the Sahara including Mali, Nigeria and Niger, before landing in Fort-Lamy (present-day N'Djamena), in Chad.

On the ground on Earth, the longest possible viewing of totality of this eclipse from a fixed location was 7 minutes and 4 seconds. (Note: Comparatively, the maximum possible duration for a terrestrially viewed total solar eclipse is 7 minutes 31 seconds.) The Concorde experienced 74 minutes of totality with an extended second contact of 7 minutes and extended third contact of 12 minutes.

== Aircraft ==
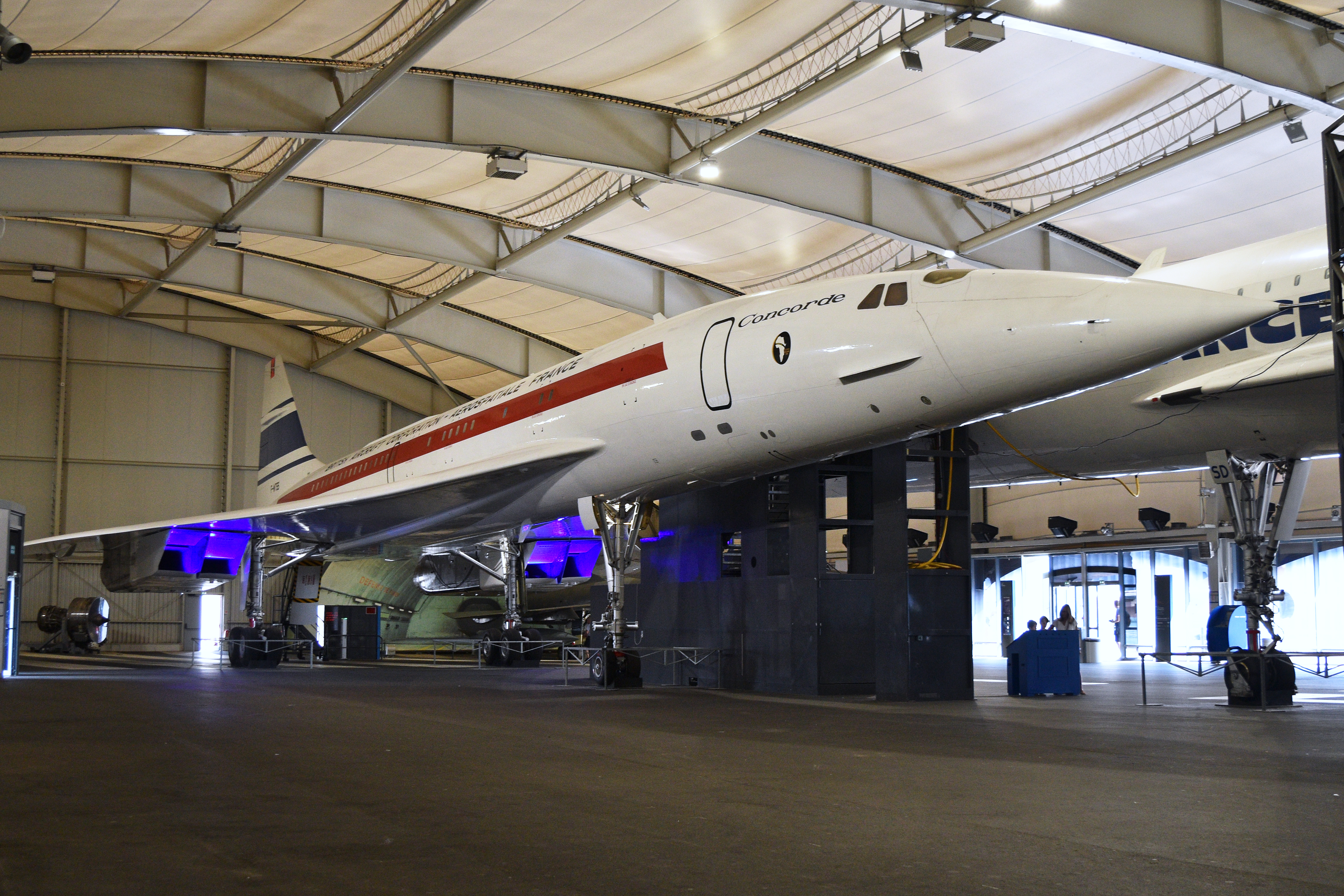
Concorde F-WTSS on display. Note the eclipse decal under the "Concorde" letters.

The original Concorde prototype 001 made its first test flight in 1969 from Toulouse Airport. The specific modified version of the aircraft used for this experiment was Concorde 001, registered as F-WTSS. The aircraft has four twin-spool Olympus 593 engines and two onboard inertial guidance systems. Four specially-made portholes were installed in the roof of the aircraft's fuselage to facilitate viewing of the Sun. Infrared and optical cameras were installed in portholes in the plane's roof to capture the Sun's corona with less atmospheric interference than there would be from the ground.

F-WTSS is now on display as an exhibit at the Musée de l’air et de l’espace in France along with Air France Concorde 213, registered as F-BTSD.

== Scientific observations ==
Five experiments were carried out during the 1973 Concorde 001 flight. Léna and his team (from one of the Paris universities) focused their efforts on studying the F-corona (the outer part of the Sun's corona, made up of dust particles). Wraight (University of Aberdeen) measured the effects of the eclipse on oxygen atoms in the Earth's atmosphere through a side-porthole. Liebenberg (University of California, Los Alamos Scientific Laboratories) measured pulsations in light intensity, while Beckman (Queen Mary College) observed the far infrared emissions from the chromosphere.

== Legacy ==
Though this event garnered wide and lasting media attention, solar researchers generally agree that the Concorde's flight has had limited scientific impact. Kevin Reardon of the National Solar Observatory said of the flight, "Strangely no significant results were ever published from the effort. [...] The overall science output was not as notable as the flight itself." Léna himself has admitted, "The five experiments all succeeded, but none of them revolutionized our understanding of the corona" and that "[the experiments] all played their role in the normal progression of scientific knowledge, but there were no extraordinary results."

On 11 August 1999, three Concorde aircraft – one from France and two from the United Kingdom – carried out a similar feat carrying tourists instead of scientists. Passengers paid $2,400, but experienced only four or five minutes of totality, which was difficult to see because of the aircraft's small windows and the location of the Sun. A similar flight was planned for the 21 June 2001 solar eclipse, but was cancelled after the 2000 plane crash of Air France Flight 4590. Airborne eclipse chasing has been successfully attempted on other non-supersonic aircraft including a LATAM Airlines Boeing 787-9 Dreamliner (E-Flight 2019-MAX), and a 2024 Gulfstream V.

The Concorde's 74 minutes of totality remains the longest-ever total eclipse observation from the surface of the Earth.
