= Alain Bouillard =

French air crash investigator

Alain Claude Michel Bouillard is a French former investigator, for the French government agency Bureau of Enquiry and Analysis for Civil Aviation Safety (BEA), of aircraft crashes, and was the chief investigator for the 2000 Concorde crash (Air France Flight 4590) and the Air France Flight 447 incident.

== Career ==
=== BEA ===
He was the Director of Security Investigations (directeur de l'enquête de sécurité) at BEA (Bureau d'Enquêtes et d'Analyses pour la Sécurité de l'Aviation Civile), the main aviation safety organisation in France, headquartered at Paris–Le Bourget Airport (Aéroport du Bourget).

He was the chief investigator for the Concorde crash in July 2000. He was on holiday when the Concorde crash took place.

He was the chief investigator for the Air France Flight 447 crash on 1 June 2009 with aircraft F-GZCP.

He has appeared on several episodes of Mayday.

== Personal life ==
In April 2015, with other people from the Ministry of Ecology, he was awarded the Legion of Honour (Ordre national de la Légion d'honneur).

== See also ==
- Jean-Paul Troadec, former Director of BEA
- Directorate General for Civil Aviation (France)
- Aviation safety
