= Paul-Louis Arslanian =

French public servant, civil aviation engineer

- Born: Arslanian
- Education: École polytechnique École nationale de l'aviation civile
- Occupation: Former Head of Bureau d'enquêtes et d'analyses pour la sécurité de l'aviation civile
- Known for: President of the Bureau d'enquêtes et d'analyses pour la sécurité de l'aviation civile
- Successor: Jean-Paul Troadec

Paul-Louis Arslanian is a French public servant, former head of the French Bureau d'enquêtes et d'analyses pour la sécurité de l'aviation civile (1995-2009). Arslanian is Officier of the Légion d'honneur, graduates from École polytechnique (promotion 1965) and École nationale de l'aviation civile (promotion 1970).

== Biography ==
Arslanian began his career as civil aviation engineer at the Directorate General for Civil Aviation followed by the Inspection générale de l'aviation civile et de la météorologie (IGACEM). He became head of the Bureau d'enquêtes et d'analyses pour la sécurité de l'aviation civile in 1995. He was replaced by Jean-Paul Troadec in 2009.

== Bibliography ==
- Académie nationale de l'air et de l'espace and Lucien Robineau, Les français du ciel, dictionnaire historique, Le Cherche midi, June 2005, 782 p. (ISBN 2-7491-0415-7), p. 38, Arslanian, Paul-Louis
