= Air France Flight 4590 =

2000 aviation accident in France

- The Concorde burning after having run over debris

Accident
- Date: 25 July 2000
- Summary: Crashed on takeoff following debris strike and in-flight fire
- Site: Gonesse, France; 48°59′08″N 2°28′20″E
- Total fatalities: 113
- Total injuries: 6

Aircraft
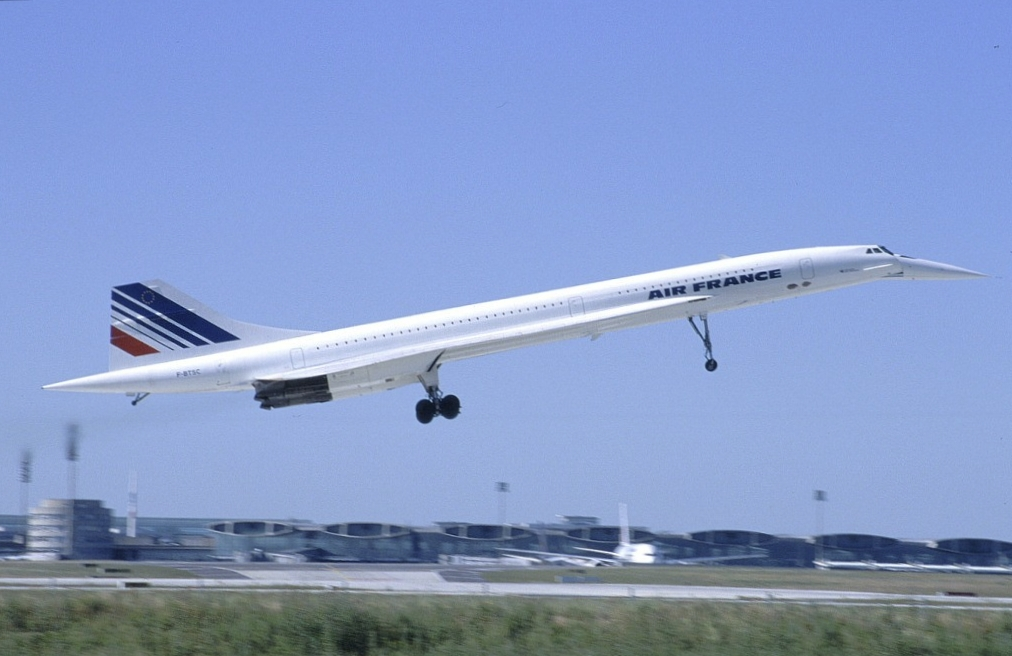
- F-BTSC, the aircraft involved in the accident, pictured in June 2000
- Aircraft type: Concorde
- Operator: Air France on behalf of Peter Deilmann Cruises
- IATA flight No.: AF4590
- ICAO flight No.: AFR4590
- Call sign: AIRFRANS 4590
- Registration: F-BTSC
- Flight origin: Charles de Gaulle Airport, Paris, France
- Destination: John F. Kennedy International Airport, New York City, New York, United States
- Occupants: 109
- Passengers: 100
- Crew: 9
- Fatalities: 109
- Survivors: 0

Ground casualties
- Ground fatalities: 4
- Ground injuries: 6

Air France Flight 4590 was an international charter flight from Paris to New York. On 25 July 2000, a Concorde passenger jet operating the flight crashed shortly after takeoff, killing all 109 people on board and four on the ground. It was the only fatal Concorde accident during its 27-year operational history.

While taking off from Charles de Gaulle Airport, Air France Flight 4590 ran over debris on the runway dropped by an aircraft during the preceding departure, causing a tyre to explode and disintegrate. Tyre fragments, launched upwards at great speed by the rapidly spinning wheel, violently struck the underside of the wing, damaging parts of the landing gear – thus preventing its retraction – and causing the integral fuel tank to rupture. Large amounts of fuel leaking from the rupture ignited, causing a loss of thrust in the left side engines 1 and 2. The aircraft lifted off, but the loss of thrust, high drag from the extended landing gear, and fire damage to the flight controls made it impossible to maintain control. The jet crashed into a hotel in nearby Gonesse two minutes after takeoff. All nine crew and one hundred passengers on board were killed, as well as four people in the hotel. Four other people sustained slight injuries.

In the wake of the disaster, the entire Concorde fleet was grounded. Following the implementation of various modifications to the airframe, it returned to service on 7 November 2001. However, due to limited commercial success, especially in the wake of the September 11 attacks, Concorde aircraft were retired by Air France in May 2003 and by British Airways that November.

== Aircraft and crew ==
The aircraft involved was a 25-year-old Aérospatiale-BAC Concorde (registration F-BTSC). It was powered by four Rolls-Royce Olympus 593/610 turbojet engines, each of which was equipped with reheat. The aircraft's last scheduled repair had taken place on 21 July 2000, four days before the accident; no problems were reported during the repair. At the time of the crash, the aircraft had flown for 11,989 hours and had made 4,873 take-off and landing cycles.

The cockpit crew consisted of the following:

- Captain Christian Marty (age 54), who had been with Air France since 1967. He had 13,477 flight hours, including 317 hours on the Concorde. Marty had also flown the Boeing 727, 737, Airbus A300, A320, and A340 aircraft.
- First officer Jean Marcot (50), who had been with Air France since 1971 and had 10,035 flight hours, with 2,698 of them on the Concorde. He had also flown the Aérospatiale N 262, Morane-Saulnier MS.760 Paris, Sud Aviation Caravelle and Airbus A300 aircraft.
- Flight engineer Gilles Jardinaud (58), who had been with Air France since 1968. He had 12,532 flight hours, of which 937 were on the Concorde aircraft. Jardinaud had also flown the Sud Aviation Caravelle, Dassault Falcon 20, Boeing 727, 737, and 747 (including the -400 variant) aircraft.

The cabin crew consisted of the following:

Cabin Services Director

- Virginie Le Gouadec (36), had 14 years with Air France, including 1.5 years on Concorde.

Flight attendant

- Brigitte Kruse (49), had 22 years with Air France, including 10 years on Concorde.
- Anne Porcheron (36), had 9 years with Air France, including one year on Concorde.
- Patrick Chevalier (38), had 10 years with Air France, including three years on Concorde.
- Hervé Garcia (32), had 7 years with Air France, including one year on Concorde.
- Florence Eyquem-Fournel (27), had four years with Air France, including 1 year on Concorde.

== Accident ==
The wind at the airport was light and variable that day, and was reported to the cockpit crew as an eight-knot (15 km/h; 9 mph) tailwind as they lined up on runway 26R.

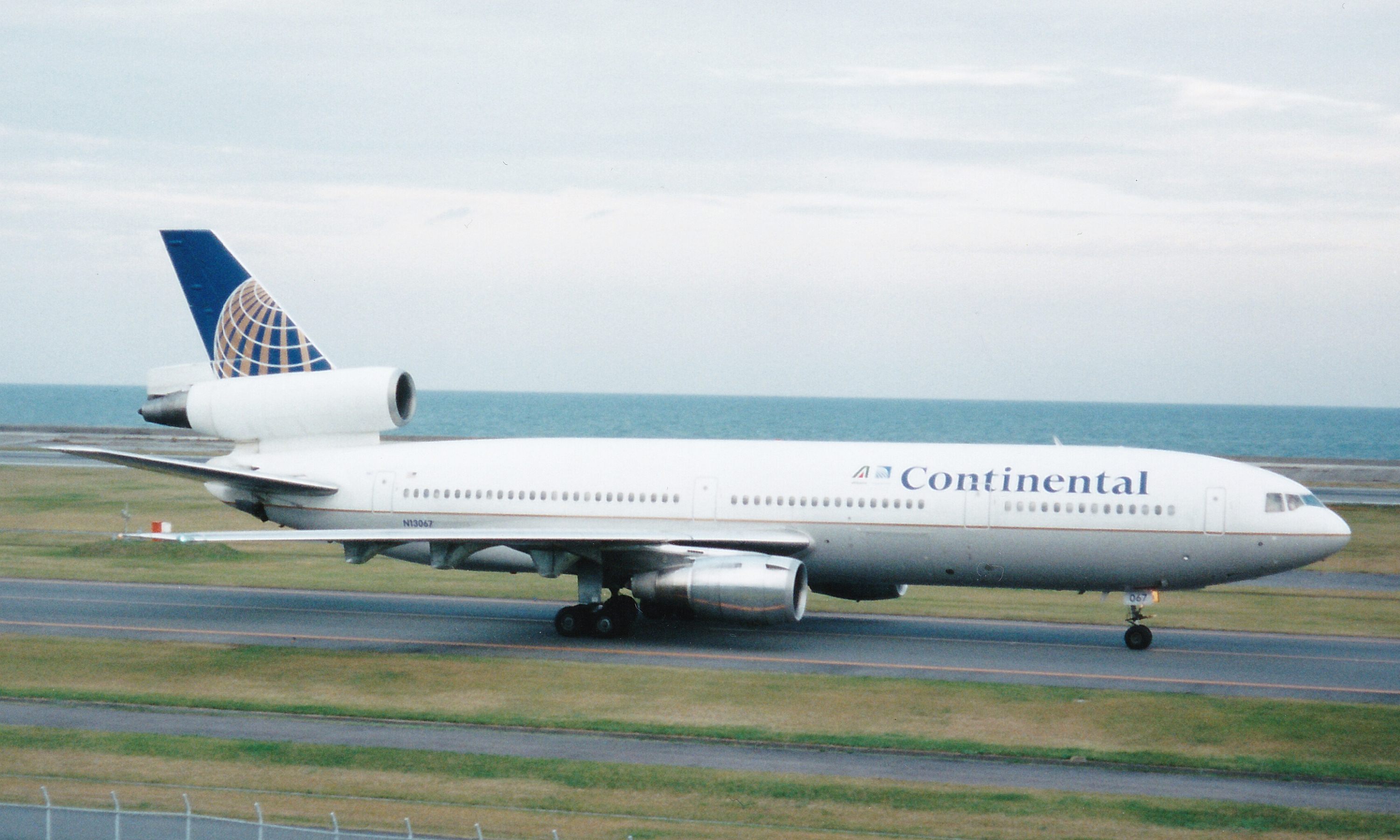
N13067, the DC-10 involved in the accident sequence

At 16:38 CEST (14:38 UTC), five minutes before the Concorde departed, Continental Airlines Flight 55, a McDonnell Douglas DC-10 (registration N13067), took off from the same runway for Newark International Airport and lost a titanium alloy wear strip that was part of the engine cowl, about 435 millimetres (17.1 in) long, 29 to 34 millimetres (1.1 to 1.3 in) wide, and 1.4 millimetres (0.055 in) thick. The DC-10 was not seriously affected by this. At 16:42, the Concorde ran over this piece of debris during its take-off run while the aircraft was at a speed of 185 mph (300 km/h), cutting the right-front tyre (tyre No 2) of its left main wheel bogie and sending a large chunk of tyre debris (4.5 kilograms or 9.9 pounds) into the underside of the left wing at an estimated speed of 140 metres per second (500 km/h; 310 mph). It did not directly puncture any of the fuel tanks, but it sent out a pressure shockwave that ruptured the number 5 fuel tank at its weakest point, just ahead of the left landing gear well. Leaking fuel gushing out from the bottom of the wing was most likely ignited either by an electric arc in the landing gear bay (debris cutting the landing gear wire) or through contact with hot parts of the engine. Engines 1 and 2 both surged and lost all power, likely due to ingestion of hot gases (both engines) and tyre debris (engine 1 only), and then engine 1 slowly recovered over the next few seconds. A large plume of flame developed, and the flight engineer shut down engine 2 in response to a fire warning and the captain's command. (Note: Section 2.2 "Crew Actions" (page 166): "The exceptional environment described above quite naturally led the FE to ask to shut down the engine. This was immediately confirmed by the Captain's calling for the engine fire procedure".)

Air traffic controller Gilles Logelin noticed the flames before the Concorde was airborne and informed the flight crew. However, the aircraft had passed V_{1} speed, at which point takeoff is considered unsafe to abort. The plane did not gain enough airspeed with the three remaining engines as damage to the landing gear bay door prevented the retraction of the undercarriage. The aircraft was unable to climb or accelerate, and its speed decayed during the course of its brief flight. The fire damaged the inner elevon of the left wing and it began to disintegrate, melted by the extremely high temperatures. Engine number 1 surged again, but did not fully recover, and the right wing lifted from the asymmetrical thrust, banking the aircraft to over 100 degrees. The crew reduced the power on engines three and four in an attempt to level the aircraft, but they lost control due to deceleration and the aircraft stalled. The aircraft struck the ground left wing low after a heading change of nearly 180°, crashing into the Hôtelissimo Les Relais Bleus Hotel. A video of the burning plane on takeoff and the aftermath of the crash was captured by a passenger in a passing truck.

The crew tried to divert to nearby Paris–Le Bourget Airport, but accident investigators stated that a safe landing would have been highly unlikely, given the aircraft's flightpath. The cockpit voice recorder (CVR) recorded the last intelligible words in the cockpit (translated into English):

Co-pilot: "Le Bourget, Le Bourget, Le Bourget."
Pilot: "Too late (unclear)."
Control tower: "Fire service leader, correction, the Concorde is returning to runway zero nine in the opposite direction."
Pilot: "No time, no (unclear)."
Co-pilot: "Negative, we're trying Le Bourget" (four switching sounds).
Co-pilot: "No (unclear)."
Fire service leader: "De Gaulle tower from fire service leader, can you give me the situation of the Concorde?" (two gongs and sound of switch, followed by another switch and sounds likened to objects being moved)
Pilot: (unclear, sounds like exertion)
Pilot: (unclear, sounds like exertion)
Pilot: (unclear, sounds like exertion)
End of recording

== Fatalities ==
The flight was chartered by German company Peter Deilmann Cruises. The passengers were on their way to board the cruise ship MS Deutschland in New York for a 16-day cruise to Manta, Ecuador. They included German football manager Rudi Faßnacht and German trade union board member Christian Götz.

All the passengers and crew, as well as four employees of the Hotelissimo hotel, were killed in the crash.

Nationality	Passengers	Crew	Ground	Total
Austria	1	—N/a	—N/a	1
Denmark	2	—N/a	—N/a	2
France	—N/a	8	—N/a	8
Germany	96	1	—N/a	97
United States	1	—N/a	—N/a	1
Algeria	—N/a	—N/a	1	1
Mauritius	—N/a	—N/a	1	1
Poland	—N/a	—N/a	2	2
Total	100	9	4	113

== Aftermath ==
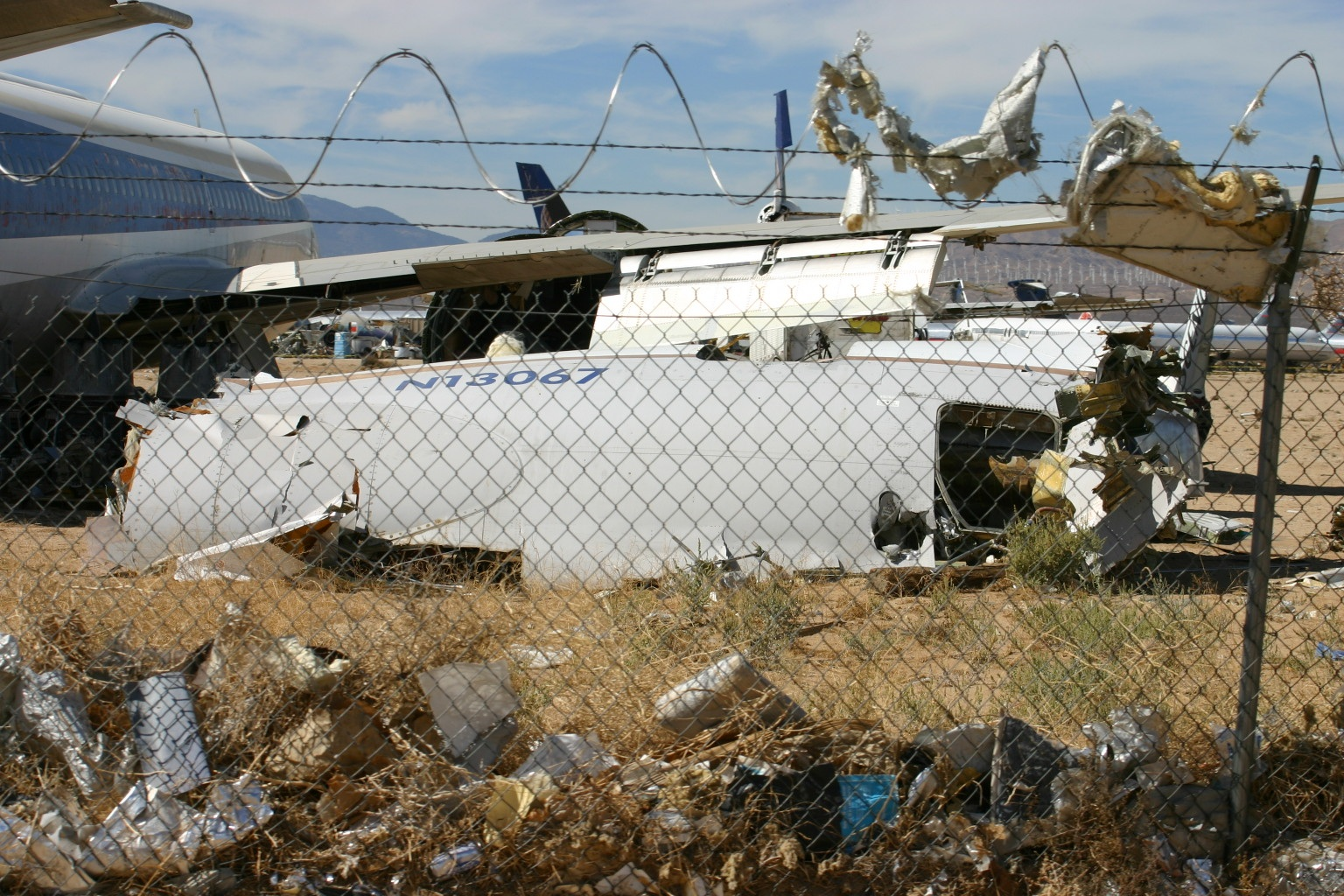
N13067, the DC-10 involved, was scrapped at Mojave, California, in 2002.

A few days after the crash, all Air France Concordes were grounded, pending an investigation into the cause of the crash and possible remedies. British Airways grounded their Concordes three weeks later for the same reason.

Air France's Concorde operation had been a money-losing venture, and it is claimed that the aeroplane had been kept in service as a matter of national pride; British Airways claimed to make a profit on its Concorde operations. According to Jock Lowe, a Concorde pilot, until the crash of Air France Flight 4590 at Paris, the British Airways Concorde operation made a net average profit of about £30M (equivalent to £54M in 2024) a year. Commercial service was resumed on 7 November 2001, after a £17M (£30M in 2024) safety improvement programme, until the type was retired between May (Air France) and October (British Airways), 2003.

This was the only fatal accident of Concorde's entire service life.

== Investigation ==
The official investigation was conducted by France's accident investigation bureau, the Bureau of Enquiry and Analysis for Civil Aviation Safety (BEA) and led by chief investigator Alain Bouillard.

Post-accident investigation revealed that the aircraft was over the maximum takeoff weight for ambient temperature and other conditions, and 810 kg (1,790 lb) over the maximum structural weight, (Note: Page 32: "The maximum structural weight on takeoff being 185,070 kg, it appears that the aircraft was slightly overloaded on takeoff".) (Note: Page 159: "14h40m01s... it can be deduced that, for the crew, the aircraft weight at which the takeoff was commenced was 185,880 kg, for a MTOW of 185,070 kg".) loaded so that the centre of gravity was aft of the take-off limit. Fuel transfer during taxiing left the number 5 wing tank 94 percent full. (Note: Section 1.16.7.3 "The Fuel in Tank 5" (page 118): "Taking into account these calculations, we may consider that the quantity of fuel in tank 5 was practically that which was loaded on the apron, which represents around 94% of the total volume of the tank".) A 30-centimetre (12 in) spacer normally keeps the left main landing gear in alignment, but it had not been replaced after recent maintenance; the BEA concluded that this did not contribute to the accident. (Note: Page 155: "In conclusion, nothing in the research undertaken indicates that the absence of the spacer contributed in any way to the accident on 25 July 2000")

The final report was issued on 16 January 2002.

=== Conclusions ===
The BEA concluded that:

- The aircraft was overloaded by 810 kilograms (1,790 lb) above the maximum safe takeoff weight. Any effect on takeoff performance from this excess weight was negligible.
- After reaching takeoff speed, the tyre of the number 2 wheel was cut by a metal strip (a wear strip) lying on the runway, which had fallen from the thrust reverser cowl door of the number 3 engine of a Continental Airlines DC-10 that had taken off from the same runway five minutes previously. This wear strip had been replaced at Tel Aviv, Israel, during a C check on 11 June 2000, and then again at Houston, Texas, on 9 July 2000. The strip installed in Houston had been neither manufactured nor installed in accordance with the procedures as defined by the manufacturer.
- The aircraft was airworthy and the crew were qualified. The landing gear that later failed to retract had not shown serious problems in the past. Despite the crew being trained and certified, no plan existed for the simultaneous failure of two engines on the runway, as it was considered highly unlikely.
- Aborting the takeoff would have led to a high-speed runway excursion and collapse of the landing gear, which also would have caused the aircraft to crash.
- While two of the engines had problems and one of them was shut down, the damage to the plane's structure was so severe that the crash would have been inevitable, even with the engines operating normally.

=== Additional factors and alternative theories ===
Former British Airways Concorde captain John Hutchinson said the fire on its own should have been "eminently survivable; the pilot should have been able to fly his way out of trouble". Hutchinson believed this did not happen owing to a series of operational errors and "negligence" by the maintenance department; however, Hutchinson makes a number of factual errors in his interview, including suggesting that the flight engineer prematurely shut down Engine #2, which is clearly contradicted by the cockpit voice recorder (CVR) transcript that shows the captain ordering the fire drill and only then the flight engineer selecting the high pressure fuel selector to "off" with an audible click.

According to a report in a British newspaper, by journalist David Rose, the crash had "more than one contributing factor, most of which were avoidable".

While examining the wreckage in a warehouse, investigators noticed that a spacer was missing from the bogie beam on the left-hand main landing gear. (It was later found in an Air France maintenance workshop.) This skewed the alignment of the landing gear because a strut was able to wobble in any direction with 3° of movement. The problem was exacerbated on the left gear's three remaining tyres by the uneven fuel load. Drag marks left on the runway by the left rear landing wheels show the Concorde was veering to the left as it accelerated toward takeoff. Photographs in the BEA report showed a smashed steel landing light, clipped by the aircraft, parts of which were probably ingested by engine number 1.

According to Rose, former French Concorde pilot Jean-Marie Chauve and former Concorde flight engineer Michel Suaud spent six months preparing a 60-page report which was submitted to the investigating judge. They re-evaluated two factors that the BEA had found to be of negligible consequence to the crash, the unbalanced weight distribution in the fuel tanks and the loose landing gear. Chauve and Suaud gave detailed calculations, stating that without the retardation caused by the missing undercarriage spacer, the aircraft would have taken off 1,684 metres (5,525 ft) from the start of the runway, before the point where the metal strip was located.

This claim is contradicted by recorded data from sensors on the aircraft that clearly showed the acceleration was normal and that the first deviation did not occur until after the aircraft struck the metal strip.

At the start of the takeoff, the aircraft had 1.2 tonnes of extra fuel which should have been burnt during the aircraft's taxi. Nineteen items of luggage, weighing some 500 kg (0.5 tonnes) were loaded onto the aircraft at the last minute without being included in the aircraft's manifest, giving the aircraft a weight of 186 tonnes, which exceeded the aircraft's certified maximum structural weight by 1 tonne. A change in wind conditions created an 8-knot tailwind, which would have reduced the regulated takeoff weight to 180 tonnes, 6 tonnes below the actual aircraft weight. Rather than taking off from the other end of the runway, in order to take off into the wind, no change in takeoff direction occurred. The additional weight of the extra fuel in tank 11, the rearmost tank, plus the additional luggage shifted the aircraft's centre of gravity rearwards, to beyond the safe operating limit of 54 percent, set by the Concorde test pilots. Once the damaged forward tank 5 began to lose fuel, the centre of gravity moved even further rearward. At one point, the aircraft drifted toward a just-landed Air France Boeing 747 that was carrying then-French President Jacques Chirac (who was returning from the 26th G8 summit meeting in Okinawa, Japan). As the plane was about to leave the runway, with the aircraft rotated for takeoff, its speed was only 188 knots, 11 knots under the minimum recommended velocity. The flight engineer shut down engine number two at only 25 feet altitude. The procedure for shutting down an engine is to wait until stable flight at 400 feet is achieved, and then only on the command of the captain.

According to Mike Bannister, former British Airways Concorde Chief Pilot, there is evidence to suggest that the fuel tank transfer pump that fed the ruptured fuel tank, was left running, causing fuel to be pumped overboard and subsequently feeding the fire, and that the fuel tank was approximately 30% full at the time of crash rather than empty, if the pump had been off.

== Previous tyre incidents ==
In November 1981, the American National Transportation Safety Board (NTSB) sent a letter of concern to the French BEA that included safety recommendations for Concorde. This communiqué was the result of the NTSB's investigations of four Air France Concorde incidents during a 20-month period from July 1979 to February 1981. The NTSB described those incidents as "potentially catastrophic", because they were caused by blown tyres during takeoff. During its 27 years in service, Concorde had about 70 tyre- or wheel-related incidents, seven of which caused serious damage to the aircraft or were potentially catastrophic.

- 13 June 1979: The number 5 and 6 tyres blew out during a takeoff from Washington Dulles International Airport. Fragments thrown from the tyres and rims damaged number 2 engine, punctured three fuel tanks, severed several hydraulic lines and electrical wires, and tore a large hole on the top of the wing over the wheel well area.
- 21 July 1979: Another blown tyre incident during takeoff from Dulles Airport. After that second incident the "French director general of civil aviation issued an Airworthiness Directive and Air France issued a Technical Information Update, each calling for revised procedures. These included required inspection of each wheel and tyre for condition, pressure, and temperature prior to each takeoff. In addition, crews were advised that landing gear should not be raised when a wheel/tyre problem is suspected."
- August 1981: British Airways (BA) plane taking off from New York suffered a blow-out, damaging landing gear door, engine, and fuel tank.
- November 1985: Tyre burst on a BA plane leaving Heathrow, causing damage to the landing gear door and fuel tank. Two engines were damaged as a result of the accident.
- January 1988: BA plane leaving Heathrow lost 10 bolts from its landing gear wheel. A fuel tank was punctured.
- July 1993: Tyre burst on a BA plane during landing at Heathrow, causing substantial ingestion damage to the number 3 engine, damaging the landing gear and wing, and puncturing an empty fuel tank.
- October 1993: Tyre burst on a BA plane during taxi at Heathrow, puncturing wing, damaging fuel tanks, and causing a major fuel leak.

Because it is a tailless delta-wing aircraft, Concorde could not use the normal flaps or slats to assist takeoff and landing, and required a significantly higher air and tyre speed during the takeoff roll than an average airliner. That higher speed increased the risk of tyre burst during takeoff. Analysis of test results revealed that this occurring could release sufficient kinetic energy to cause the fuel tank to rupture. The analysis of impact energy considered a tyre piece of 4.5 kilograms (9.9 lb) with a speed around 140 metres per second (310 mph). The piece could reach this speed by combination of rotation of the tyre on takeoff and the tyre burst.

== Modifications and revival ==
The accident led to modifications to Concorde, including more-secure electrical controls, Kevlar lining to the fuel tanks, and specially developed burst-resistant tyres.

The crash of the Air France Concorde nonetheless proved to be the beginning of the end for the type. Just before service resumed, the September 11 attacks took place, resulting in a marked drop in passenger numbers, and contributing to the eventual end of Concorde flights. Air France stopped flights in May 2003, followed by British Airways five months later.

In June 2010, two groups attempted, unsuccessfully, to revive Concorde for "Heritage" flights in time for the 2012 Summer Olympics. The British Save Concorde Group, SCG, and French group Olympus 593 were attempting to obtain four Rolls-Royce Olympus engines from the Le Bourget Air and Space Museum.

== Criminal investigation ==
In March 2005, French authorities began a criminal investigation of Continental Airlines, whose plane dropped the debris on the runway, and in September of the same year, Henri Perrier, the former chief engineer of the Concorde division at Aérospatiale at the time of the first test flight in 1969 and the programme director in the 1980s and early 1990s, was placed under formal investigation.

In March 2008, Bernard Farret, a deputy prosecutor in Pontoise, outside Paris, asked judges to bring manslaughter charges against Continental Airlines and two of its employees – John Taylor, the mechanic who replaced the wear strip on the DC-10, and his manager Stanley Ford – alleging negligence in the way the repair was carried out. Continental denied the charges, and claimed in court that it was being used as a scapegoat by the BEA. The airline suggested that the Concorde "was already on fire when its wheels hit the titanium strip, and that around 20 first-hand witnesses had confirmed that the plane seemed to be on fire immediately after it began its take-off roll".

At the same time, charges were laid against Henri Perrier, head of the Concorde program at Aérospatiale; Jacques Hérubel, Concorde's chief engineer; and Claude Frantzen, head of DGAC, the French airline regulator. It was alleged that Perrier, Hérubel, and Frantzen knew that the plane's fuel tanks could be susceptible to damage from foreign objects, but nonetheless allowed it to fly.

The trial ran in a Parisian court from February to December 2010. Continental Airlines was found criminally responsible for the disaster. It was fined €200,000 ($271,628) and ordered to pay Air France €1 million. Taylor was given a 15-month suspended sentence, while Ford, Perrier, Hérubel, and Frantzen were cleared of all charges. The court ruled that the crash resulted from a piece of metal from a Continental jet that was left on the runway; the object punctured a tyre on the Concorde and then ruptured a fuel tank. The convictions were overturned by a French appeals court in November 2012, thereby clearing Continental (which had merged with United Airlines by then) and Taylor of criminal responsibility.

The Parisian court also ruled that Continental would have to pay 70% of any compensation claims. As Air France had already paid out €100 million to the families of the victims, Continental could be made to pay its share of that compensation payout. The French appeals court, while overturning the criminal rulings by the Parisian court, affirmed the civil ruling and left Continental liable for the compensation claims.

== Legacy ==
Gonesse memorial

A monument in honour of the crash victims was established at Gonesse. The Gonesse monument consists of a piece of transparent glass with a piece of an aircraft wing jutting through. Another monument, a 6,000-square-metre (65,000 sq ft) memorial surrounded with topiary planted in the shape of a Concorde, was established in 2006 at Mitry-Mory, just south of Charles de Gaulle Airport.

== Documentaries and other media ==
- The Concorde that crashed was the primary aircraft extensively used in The Concorde... Airport '79.
- The timeline and causes of the crash were profiled in the premiere episode of the National Geographic documentary series Seconds From Disaster.
- NBC aired a Dateline NBC documentary on the crash, its causes, and its legacy on 22 February 2009.
- Channel 4 and Discovery Channel Canada aired a documentary called Concorde's Last Flight.
- The Smithsonian Channel aired a 90-minute documentary on the crash in 2010.
- The accident and subsequent investigation were featured in the 7th episode during Season 14 of the Canadian documentary series Mayday (also known as Air Crash Investigation) titled "Concorde: Up in Flames", first broadcast in January 2015.
- In 2020, Montreal synth-pop group Le Couleur released an album, Concorde, inspired by the story of this crash.
- In the song "Concorde" from the rock band Black Country, New Road the lyrics subtly mention the crash as that is what the word "Concorde" is most known for in media.
- The accident was featured in an episode of Black Box Down.
