= Donald Liebenberg =

American solar astronomer (born 1931 or 1932)

- Born: 1931 or 1932 (age 94–95)
- Education: University of Wisconsin
- Known for: Having witnessed 27 total solar eclipses
- Spouse: Norma Liebenberg
- Scientific career
- Fields: Astronomy
- Workplaces: Clemson University (current); Los Alamos National Laboratory (former)

Donald Liebenberg (born 1931 or 1932) is an American astronomer and adjunct professor in the department of physics and astronomy at Clemson University.

An avowed eclipse chaser, he is best known for having traveled around the world to see 27 total solar eclipses since 1954. He is also regarded as having spent more time in totality, the darkest area within the Moon's umbra during a total solar eclipse, than anyone else alive.

== Education ==
Liebenberg attended the University of Wisconsin as a physics major in the early 1950s. He holds three degrees, including a PhD, from his alma mater.

== Career and eclipses ==
Liebenberg witnessed his first total solar eclipse on June 30, 1954, in Mellen, Wisconsin. Since then, he has traveled around the world to see solar eclipses, witnessing a total of 27 total solar eclipses. He observed his 27th, the solar eclipse of August 21, 2017, from his driveway; by coincidence, his house in Salem, South Carolina, was located in the path of totality.

His primary motivation for pursuing solar eclipses has been to study the Sun's corona. To this end, he wrote a proposal and obtained a grant from the National Science Foundation in 1954. He later worked for the Los Alamos National Laboratory carrying out research into the temperature and energy input of the corona. In 1973, Liebenberg was invited by French officials and scientists to participate in the observation of the solar eclipse of June 30, 1973, on an early Concorde supersonic aircraft. Flying on the Concorde, a group of scientists from Los Alamos and the Paris Observarory, including Liebenberg, remained in the path of totality for 74 minutes while conducting various scientific measurements of the corona. For comparison, the theoretical maximum duration for totality during the third millennium for any stationary point or observer on the Earth's surface is approximately seven and a half minutes.

He has worked as an adjunct professor in Clemson's department of physics and astronomy since 1996.

== Personal life ==
Liebenberg and his wife Norma reside in Salem, South Carolina.
