= Solar viewer =

Eyewear for viewing the sun

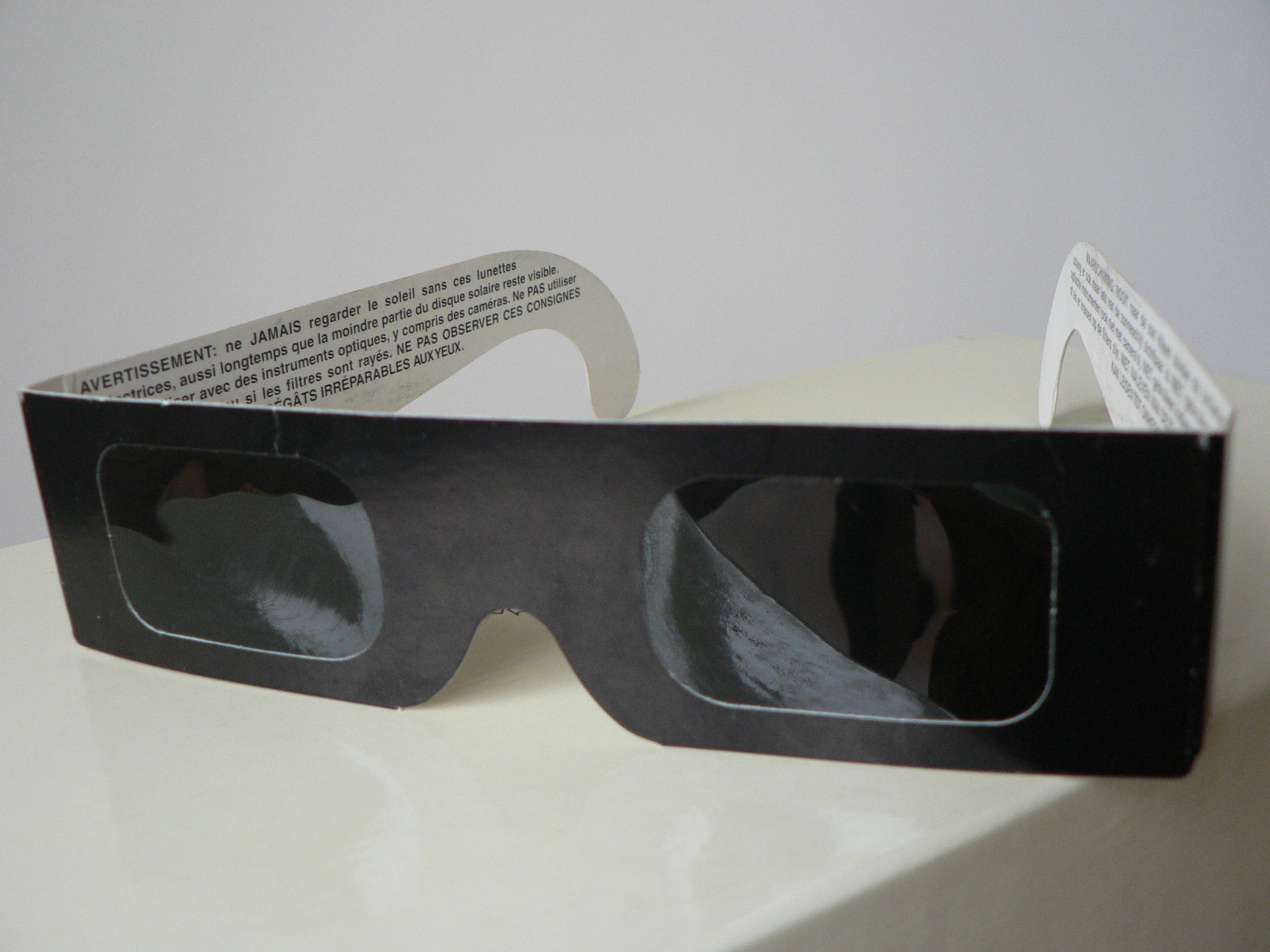
Solar eclipse glasses

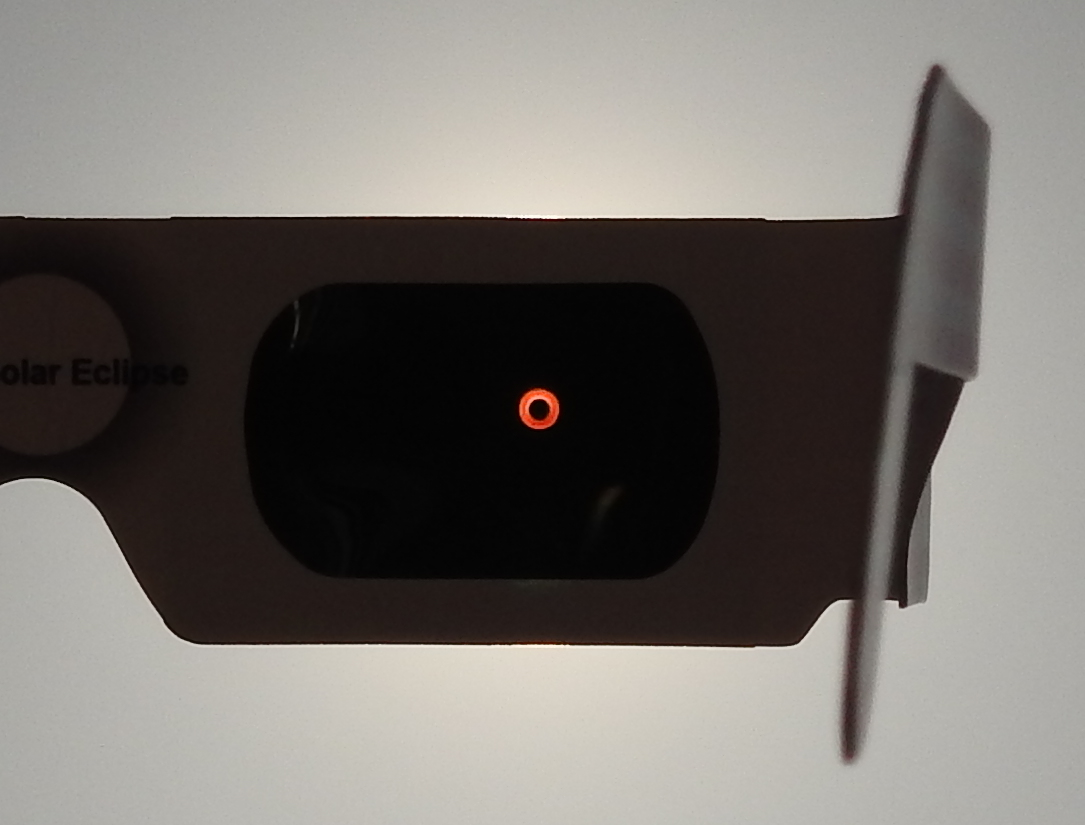
The solar eclipse of December 26, 2019 seen through one of the filters of a pair of solar eclipse glasses in Jaffna, Sri Lanka

Solar viewers (also known as solar viewing glasses or solar eclipse glasses) are special eyewear designed for direct viewing of the Sun. Standard sunglasses are unable to filter out eye-damaging radiation. Solar viewers can be used for safe viewing of solar events such as eclipses. The recommended optical density of this eyewear is 5, meaning that the solar viewing filter only permits 1 part in 100,000 of incident light to pass through. In addition to blocking visible light, solar viewers also block ultraviolet and infrared rays which can damage one's eyes.

== Safety ==
According to the American Astronomical Society (AAS), products meeting the ISO 12312-2 standard are safe for direct solar viewing. The AAS maintains web pages giving detailed information about safe solar viewers and a list of reputable vendors of eclipse glasses. The organization warned against products claiming ISO certification, or even citing the exact standard number, but not tested by an accredited laboratory, or those bearing incomplete certification information. Another problem was counterfeits of reputable vendors' products, some even claiming the company's name (such as with American Paper Optics, which published information detailing the differences between its glasses and counterfeits).

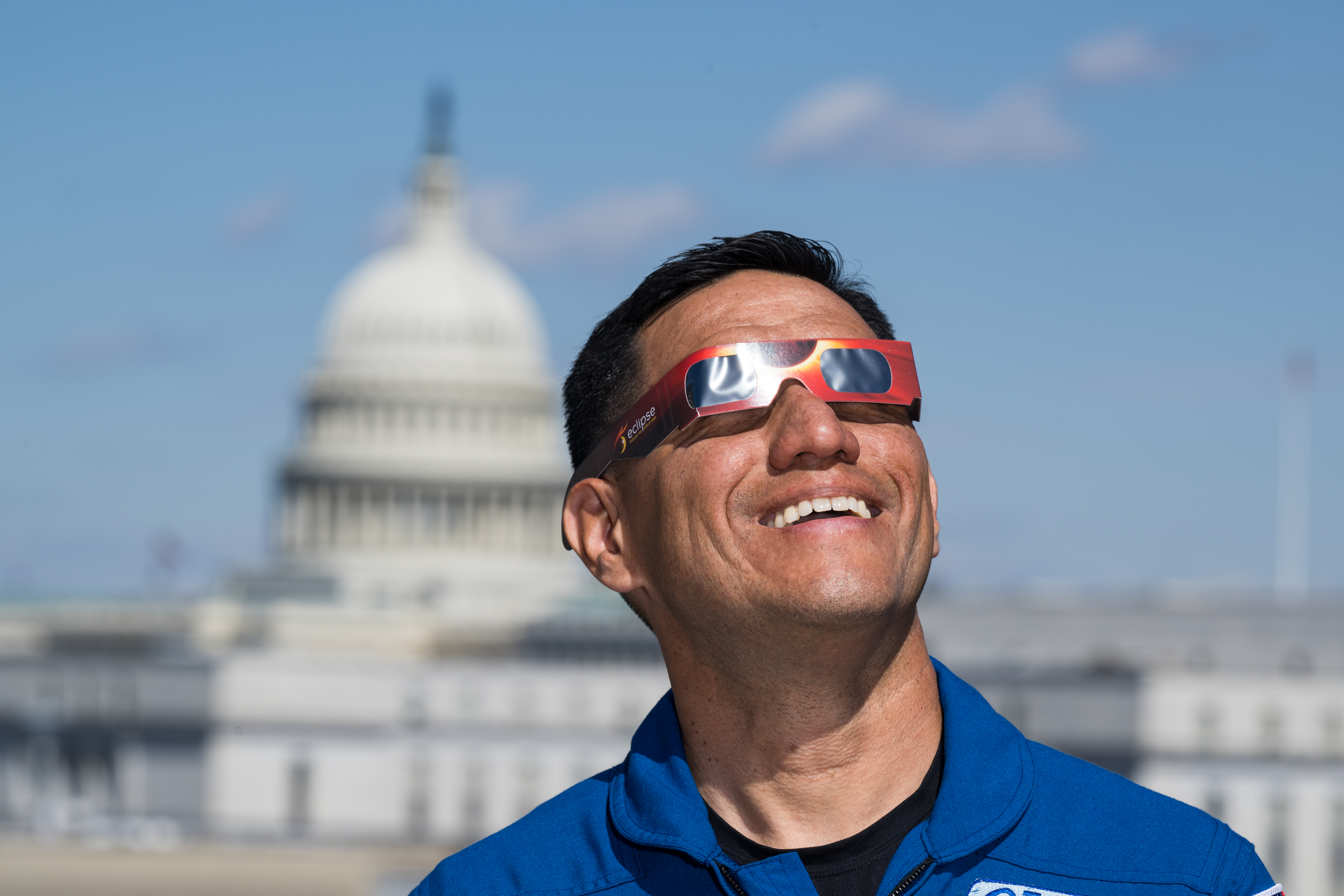
Expedition 69 crew member wearing a pair of solar eclipse glasses.

Solar viewers manufactured prior to 2015 may have a three-year limit before they can no longer effectively filter out UV radiation and should no longer be used. Starting in 2015, products manufactured to meet the standards of ISO 12312-2 can be used indefinitely as long as they have not been damaged by scratches or tears.

Solar viewers should be used for safe viewing of the Sun during partial solar eclipses and during the partial phases of a total solar eclipse event, when the Moon only covers a portion of the Sun's surface. Only during the brief period of totality of a total solar eclipse is it safe to view the Sun directly with the naked eye.

=== Counterfeit eclipse glasses ===
In the months leading to the solar eclipse of August 21, 2017, counterfeits of light-filtering glasses for solar eclipses began proliferating. Effective eclipse glasses filter visible, ultraviolet, and infrared light. The eye's retina lacks pain receptors, and thus damage could occur without one's awareness.

The AAS said determining whether an eclipse viewer was safe required a spectrophotometer and lab equipment, but often the user should see nothing through the filter except for the Sun, sunlight reflecting off shiny metal, or intense light sources such as an LED flashlight.

Andrew Lund, the owner of a vendor of eclipse glasses, noted that not all counterfeit glasses were necessarily unsafe. He stated to Quartz that the counterfeits he tested blocked the majority of harmful light, concluding that "the IP is getting ripped off, but the good news is there are no long-term harmful effects."

On July 27, 2017, Amazon required all eclipse viewing products sold on its website have a submission of origin and safety information, and proof of an accredited ISO certification. In mid-August 2017, Amazon recalled and pulled listings for eclipse viewing glasses that "may not comply with industry standards", and gave refunds to customers who had purchased them.

On April 8, 2024, the Illinois Department of Public Health issued a recall on specific brands of eclipse glasses that failed to meet proper safety standards.

== See also ==
- Astronomical solar filter
- Eclipse chasing
- Solar telescope
- Transit of Mercury
- Transit of Venus
