= Pierre Léna =

French astrophysicist (born 1937)

- Pierre Lena au festival international de géographie 2024
- Born: Pierre Jean Marie Léna; 22 November 1937
- Occupation: Astrophysicist
- Awards: Officer of the Legion of Honor (2007); Commander of the National Order of Merit (2010); Prix Jules Janssen (1999); Fernand Holweck Medal and Prize (1995); Commander of the Legion of Honour (2021)

Pierre Léna, born on 22 November 1937 in Paris, is a French astrophysicist. He is a member of the French Academy of Sciences.

In 1973, Léna was one of the scientists aboard the Concorde 001 during its flight in the shadow of a solar eclipse. Aboard, he conducted an experiment studying the F-corona (dust particles left over from comets in the sun's corona). Léna later published a book, Concorde 001 et l’ombre de la Lune (2015), about his experience with the flight.

He was the winner of the Fernand Holweck Medal and Prize in 1995 and of the Prix Jules Janssen in 1999, among other awards received.
