= Bureau of Enquiry and Analysis for Civil Aviation Safety =

French civil aviation accident investigation agency

- Bureau d'enquêtes et d'analyses pour la sécurité de l'aviation civile

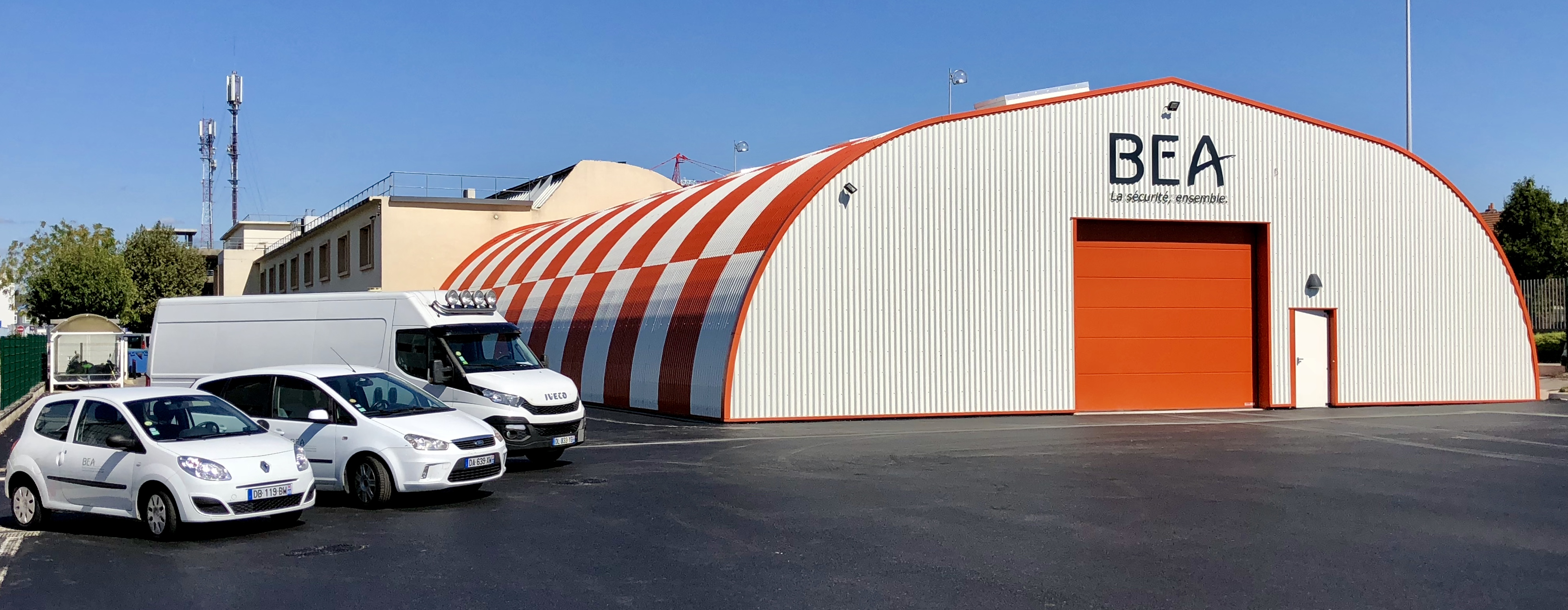

Agency overview
- Formed: 1946
- Jurisdiction: French territory and French aircraft
- Headquarters: Le Bourget Airport
- Employees: 96 (December 2019)
- Agency executive: Pierre-Yves Huerre, Director (since 2024)
- Parent agency: French Ministry of Transport
- Website: bea.aero/en/

The Bureau of Enquiry and Analysis for Civil Aviation Safety (French: Bureau d'enquêtes et d'analyses pour la sécurité de l'aviation civile, BEA) is an agency of the French government, responsible for investigating civil aviation accidents and incidents and making safety recommendations based on what is learned from those investigations.

Its headquarters are at Paris–Le Bourget Airport in Le Bourget, near Paris. The BEA has 96 employees in 2019, including 30 investigators and 12 investigative assistants. It is under the authority of the Ministry of Ecology, Sustainable Development, Transport and Housing.

The BEA was created in 1946. It operates under, amongst other texts, the French civil aviation and transports codes.

Following international rules, French authorities are responsible for investigating all aircraft accidents occurring in French territory or airspace, as well as accidents involving French aircraft occurring in international airspace or in other countries if the local authorities do not open a technical enquiry. They may also assist foreign investigation authorities at their request. They are also the investigating party for all aircraft manufactured by the multinational Airbus.

As of 2025, the head of the BEA is Pierre-Yves Huerre, who began his term on 1 January 2024. Previous BEA heads include Jean-Paul Troadec, and Rémi Jouty, engineer general of the Bridges, Waters and Forests.

== Facilities ==
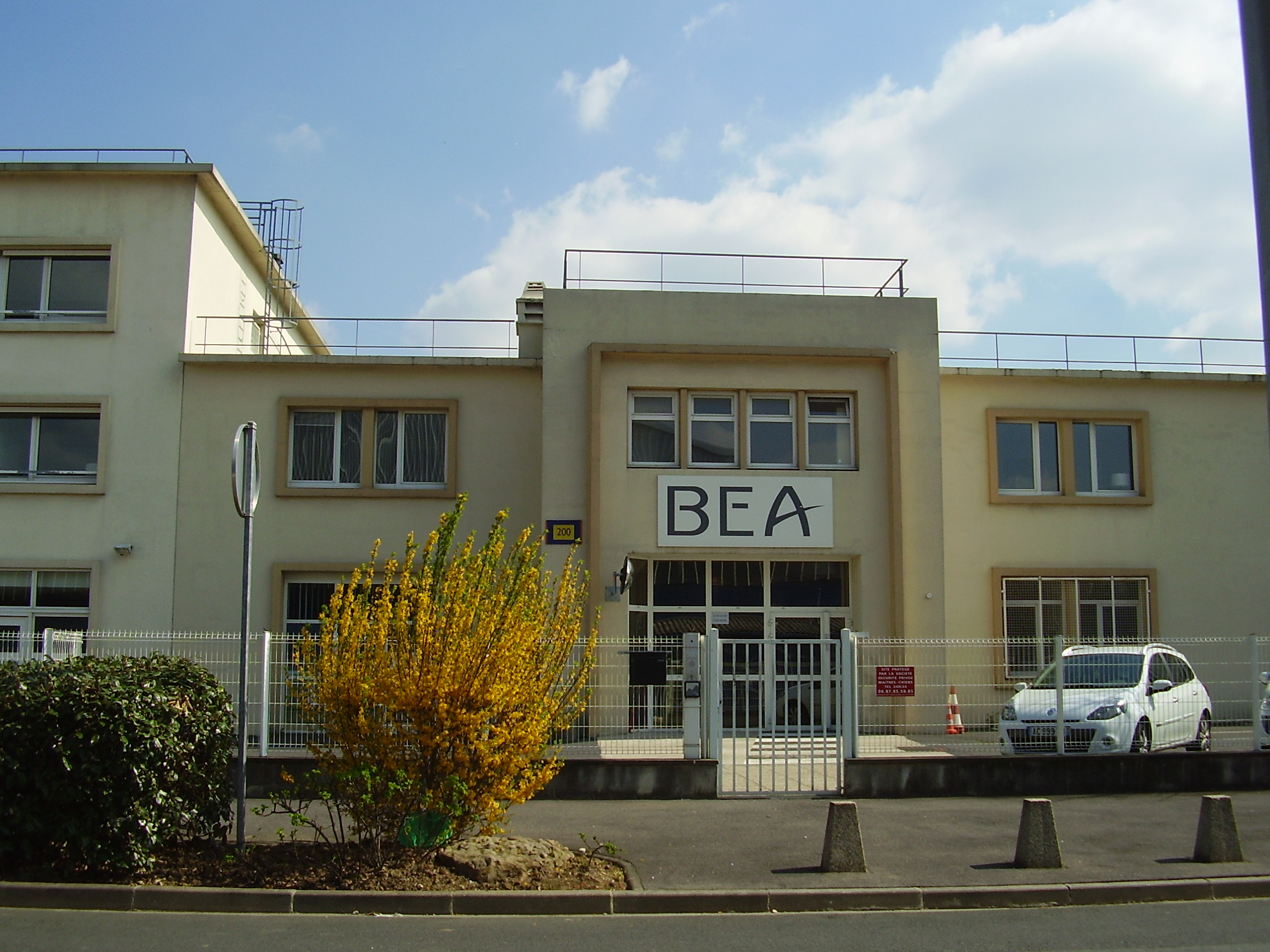
Building 153, the head office of the BEA

It is headquartered in Building 153 on the grounds of Paris–Le Bourget Airport in Le Bourget, near Paris. The BEA building is located in front of the French Air and Space Museum and houses offices and laboratories. The BEA building at Le Bourget has over 5,000 square metres (54,000 sq ft) of space; it had been expanded to that amount in 2002, and to 3,000 square metres (32,000 sq ft) by 1999. Previously the building had 1,000 square metres (11,000 sq ft) of space.

In addition the BEA has facilities at Melun Aerodrome. They include hangars and protected areas with a combined total of 6,000 square metres (65,000 sq ft) of space. The BEA also has hangars and protected areas in Bonneuil-sur-Marne. The BEA has satellite offices in Aix-en-Provence, Bordeaux, Rennes, and Toulouse.

At one time the head office of the Bureau d'Enquêtes-Accidents (as it was known before 2001, and is still frequently if loosely referred to) was in the 15th arrondissement of Paris.

== Gallery ==
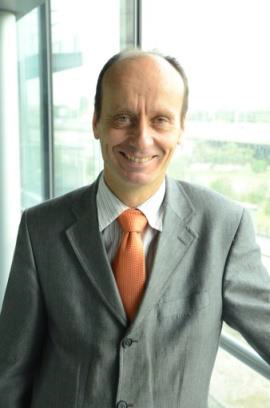
Former BEA director Rémi Jouty

== See also ==
- Aviation safety
- Bureau enquêtes accidents pour la sécurité de l'aéronautique d'État (BEA-É) - The equivalent agency for state and military aircraft
- Bureau d'Enquêtes sur les Événements de Mer (BEAmer) – French maritime transport investigation agency
- French Land Transport Accident Investigation Bureau (Bureau d'Enquêtes sur les Accidents de Transport Terrestre; BEA-TT) – French ground transport investigation agency
- Air Accidents Investigation Branch (UK)
- Jean-Paul Troadec, former Director of BEA
- Alain Bouillard, former BEA chief investigator for the Air France Flight 4590 and Air France Flight 447 incidents
