= Christian Marty =

French airline pilot and athlete (1945–2000)

- Born: 12 November 1946; 15th arrondissement of Paris, France
- Died: 25 July 2000 (aged 53); Gonesse, France
- Cause of death: Aircraft crash
- Burial place: Villars-Colmars, Alpes-de-Haute-Provence, France
- Occupations: Pilot, athlete
- Known for: Being the first person to windsurf across the Atlantic Ocean and as the captain of Air France Flight 4590
- Spouse: 1
- Children: 2

Christian Henri Marty (12 November 1946 – 25 July 2000) was a French pilot who served as the captain of Air France Flight 4590. Prior to the crash, Marty was an athlete in extreme sports.

== Athletic career ==
Marty specialized in long-distance windsurfing, as well as rally driving, cycling, skiing, and hang-gliding. In 1980, Marty windsurfed from Nice, France, to Calvi, Corsica, covering a distance of 169 kilometres (105 mi; 91 nmi).

Equipped with a specially designed sailboard and accompanied by a supply boat, he embarked from Dakar, Senegal on his first, though unsuccessful, attempt to cross the Atlantic Ocean on 28 November 1981. His second attempt, on 12 December 1981, was successful and he arrived in Kourou, French Guiana, on 18 January 1982, making him the first person to cross the Atlantic on a sailboard. In total he covered a distance of 4,222 kilometres (2,623 mi; 2,280 nmi) in nearly 38 days.

== Aviation career ==
Marty obtained his pilot's license on 12 July 1967. Two years later, in 1969, he earned his commercial pilot's license and began flying for the prestigious Air France. During his career, Marty was a pilot and flight instructor, operating a range of aircraft models including the Airbus A300, A320, and A340, the Boeing 727 and 737, as well as the Concorde.

He joined the elite ranks of pilots certified to fly Concorde airliners on 16 August 1999.

== Death ==
On 25 July 2000, Marty served as captain onboard Air France Flight 4590, operating the route from Paris's Charles de Gaulle Airport to New York's John F. Kennedy International Airport. Accompanied by First Officer Jean Marcot and Flight Engineer Gilles Jardinaud, Marty commenced a routine taxi down the runway to takeoff. During the process, the aircraft's landing gear ran over a metal strip dropped by another aircraft, a Continental Airlines McDonnell Douglas DC-10. This damaged a tire, it punctured the fuel tank and ignited an in-flight fire. The situation quickly escalated, causing the aircraft to lose control. It crashed into a hotel located in Gonesse, near Charles de Gaulle Airport, claiming the lives of all 109 people on board the aircraft as well as four additional individuals on the ground. Marty was buried in Villars-Colmars on 9 August.

== Bibliography ==
- Marty, Christian (3 October 1984). L'atlantique À Mains Nues [The Atlantic with bare hands] (in French). Hachette. ISBN 2851083058.
