= Jet engine ingestion =

When an object is sucked into a jet engine

A jet engine ingestion occurs when an object is sucked into a running jet engine, sometimes causing engine failure. Birds or other flying animals are ingested into aircraft jet engines thousands of times per year, and there have been incidents of humans being accidentally or even suicidally ingested into jet engines. Other objects can also be ingested and cause engine damage or failure, such as the runway debris that led to the catastrophic crash of the Concorde airliner operating Air France Flight 4590 on 25 July 2000.

== Fatal incidents of humans being ingested ==
- On February 24, 1989, United Airlines Flight 811 suffered from an explosive decompression after a section of fuselage was torn off mid-air near Hawaii. The aircraft landed safely but nine people were sucked out of the aircraft and presumed dead. At least one passenger was sucked into one of the engines and died as human remains were found during subsequent investigation.
- On January 14, 1990, Daniel John O'Brien, a man from Illinois, trespassed onto the tarmac of Piarco International Airport, stole an automobile and crashed it into a taxiing British Airways Boeing 747, which destroyed the car and injured O'Brien. He then got out of the car and threw himself into the no. 2 engine, killing him instantly.
- On January 16, 2006, a ground crew worker was ingested into the right engine of Continental Airlines Flight 1515, a Boeing 737, at El Paso International Airport.
- On December 16, 2015, ground engineer Ravi Subramanian was ingested into the no. 2 engine of an Air India Airbus A319 in Chhatrapati Shivaji Maharaj International Airport, after the engine came too close to him, unaware of it due to him wearing intercom headphones. The aircraft's pilots started the engines after mistaking a ground crew signal for pushback.
- On December 31, 2022, ground crew worker Courtney Edwards was ingested into the no. 1 engine of an Envoy Air Embraer E175, which was on idle, as it arrived at the gate at Montgomery Regional Airport after accidentally stepping in front of it.
- On June 23, 2023, a ground crew worker was ingested after he intentionally stepped in front of the no. 1 engine of a Delta Air Lines Airbus A319 which was taxiing to the gate at San Antonio International Airport.
- On July 8, 2025, a man was ingested by the no. 1 engine of a Volotea Airbus A319 which was taxiing for takeoff at Milan Bergamo Airport.
- On May 8, 2026, a man named Michael Mott gained unauthorized access to the runway at Denver International Airport and was fatally struck during the takeoff roll of a Frontier Airlines flight operated by an Airbus A321neo bound for Los Angeles. The crew reported a loud impact and rejected the takeoff, after which the aircraft experienced a brief engine malfunction and fire. Passengers and crew were evacuated, and Mott was pronounced dead at the scene. Authorities launched an investigation into the runway incursion and circumstances of the incident. The Denver Medical Examiner later ruled his death as suicide on 12 May 2026.
