= Solar eclipse of June 30, 1973 =

Total eclipse

- Total eclipse
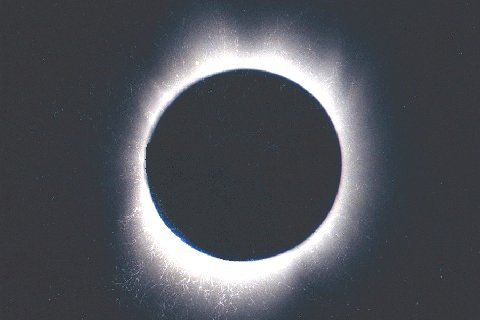
- Totality viewed off the Mauritanian coast

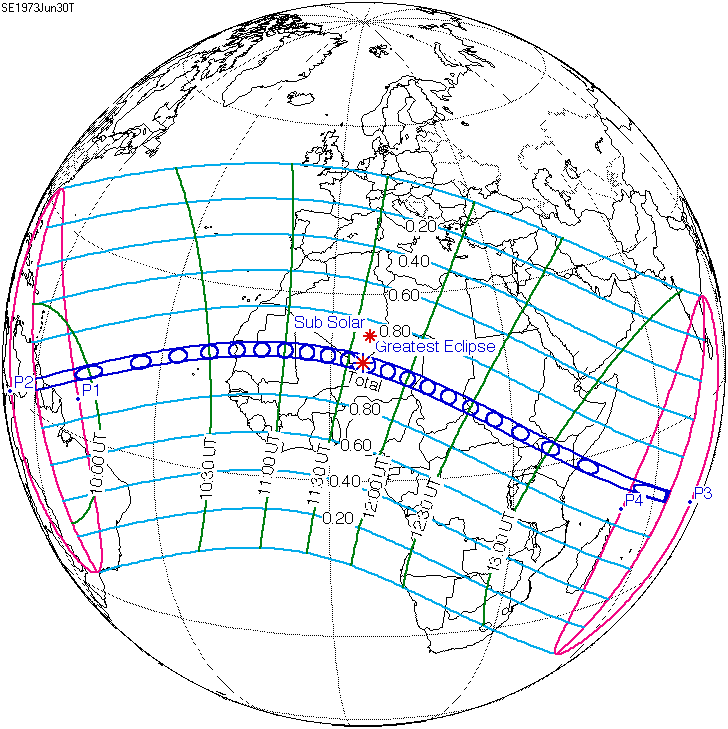
- Map
- Gamma: −0.0785
- Magnitude: 1.0792

Maximum eclipse
- Duration: 424 s (7 min 4 s)
- Coordinates: 18.8°N 5.6°E
- Max. width of band: 256 km (159 mi)

Times (UTC)
- Greatest eclipse: 11:38:41

References
- Saros: 136 (35 of 71)
- Catalog # (SE5000): 9450

A total solar eclipse occurred at the Moon's descending node of orbit on Saturday, June 30, 1973, with a magnitude of 1.0792. A solar eclipse occurs when the Moon passes between Earth and the Sun, thereby totally or partly obscuring the image of the Sun for a viewer on Earth. A total solar eclipse occurs when the Moon's apparent diameter is larger than the Sun's, blocking all direct sunlight, turning day into darkness. Totality occurs in a narrow path across Earth's surface, with the partial solar eclipse visible over a surrounding region thousands of kilometres wide. Occurring about 11 hours after perigee (on June 30, 1973, at 0:50 UTC), the Moon's apparent diameter was larger.

With a maximum eclipse of 7 minutes and 3.55 seconds, this was the last total solar eclipse that exceeds 7 minutes in this series. There will not be a longer total solar eclipse until June 25, 2150.

The greatest eclipse occurred in the Agadez area in the northwest of Niger not far from Algeria inside the Sahara Desert somewhat 40 km east of the small mountain of Ebenenanoua at 18.8 N and 5.6 E and occurred at 11:38 UTC.

The umbral portion of the path started near the border of Guyana and the Brazilian state Roraima, passed northern Dutch Guiana (today's Suriname), headed into the Atlantic, included one of the Portuguese Cape Verde (today's Cape Verde) Islands, which was Santo Antão, Nouadhibou and Nouakchott and other parts of Central Mauritania, northern Mali, the southernmost of Algeria, the middle and southeastern Niger, the middle of Chad, the Sudan including Darfur and parts that are now in the South Sudan including Kodok, a part of the northernmost Uganda, a part of northern Kenya, the southernmost of Somalia, and the Alphonse Group of British Seychelles (today's Seychelles). A partial eclipse was visible for parts of eastern South America, Africa, Southern Europe, and the Middle East.

== Observations ==
This eclipse was observed by a group of scientists, which included Donald Liebenberg, from the Los Alamos National Laboratory. They used two airplanes to extend the apparent time of totality by flying along the eclipse path in the same direction as the Moon's shadow as it passed over Africa. One of the planes was a prototype (c/n 001) of what was later to become the Concorde, which has a top speed of almost 1,300 miles per hour (2,100 km/h) (Mach 2). This enabled scientists from Los Alamos, the Paris Observatory, the Kitt Peak National Observatory, Queen Mary University of London, the University of Aberdeen and CNRS to extend totality to more than 74 minutes; nearly 10 times longer than is possible when viewing a total solar eclipse from a stationary location. The Concorde was specially modified with rooftop portholes for the mission, and is currently on display with the Solar Eclipse mission livery at Musée de l’air et de l’espace. The data gathered resulted in three papers published in Nature and a book.

The eclipse was also observed by a charter flight from Mount San Antonio College in Southern California. The DC-8 with 150 passengers intercepted the eclipse at 35,000 feet (11,000 m) just off the east coast of Africa and tracked the eclipse for three minutes. The passengers rotated seats every 20 seconds so that each passenger had three 20 second opportunities at the window to observe and take pictures. A separate observation opportunity was provided on a specialized commercial cruise by the S.S. Canberra, which traveled from New York City to the Canary Islands and Dakar, Senegal, observing 5 minutes and 44 seconds of totality out in the Atlantic between those two stops in Africa. The cruise's passengers included notable people in the scientific community such as Neil Armstrong, Scott Carpenter, Isaac Asimov, Walter Sullivan, and the then 15-year old Neil deGrasse Tyson.

=== Gallery ===
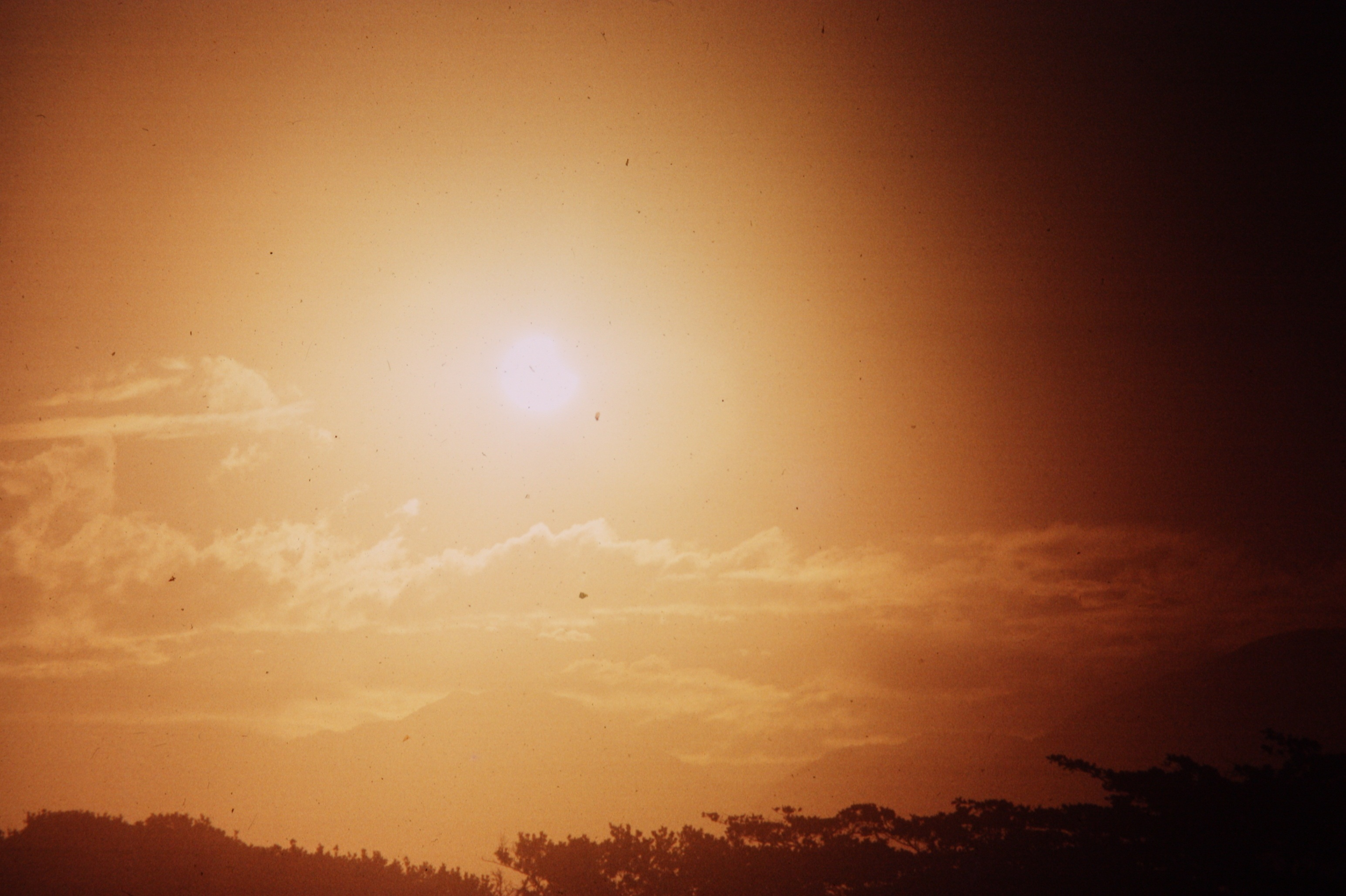
From Manafiafy, Madagascar

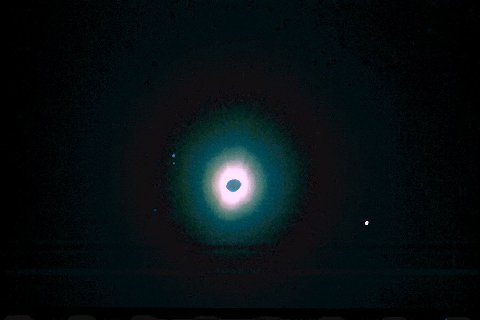
As seen off the Mauritanian coast

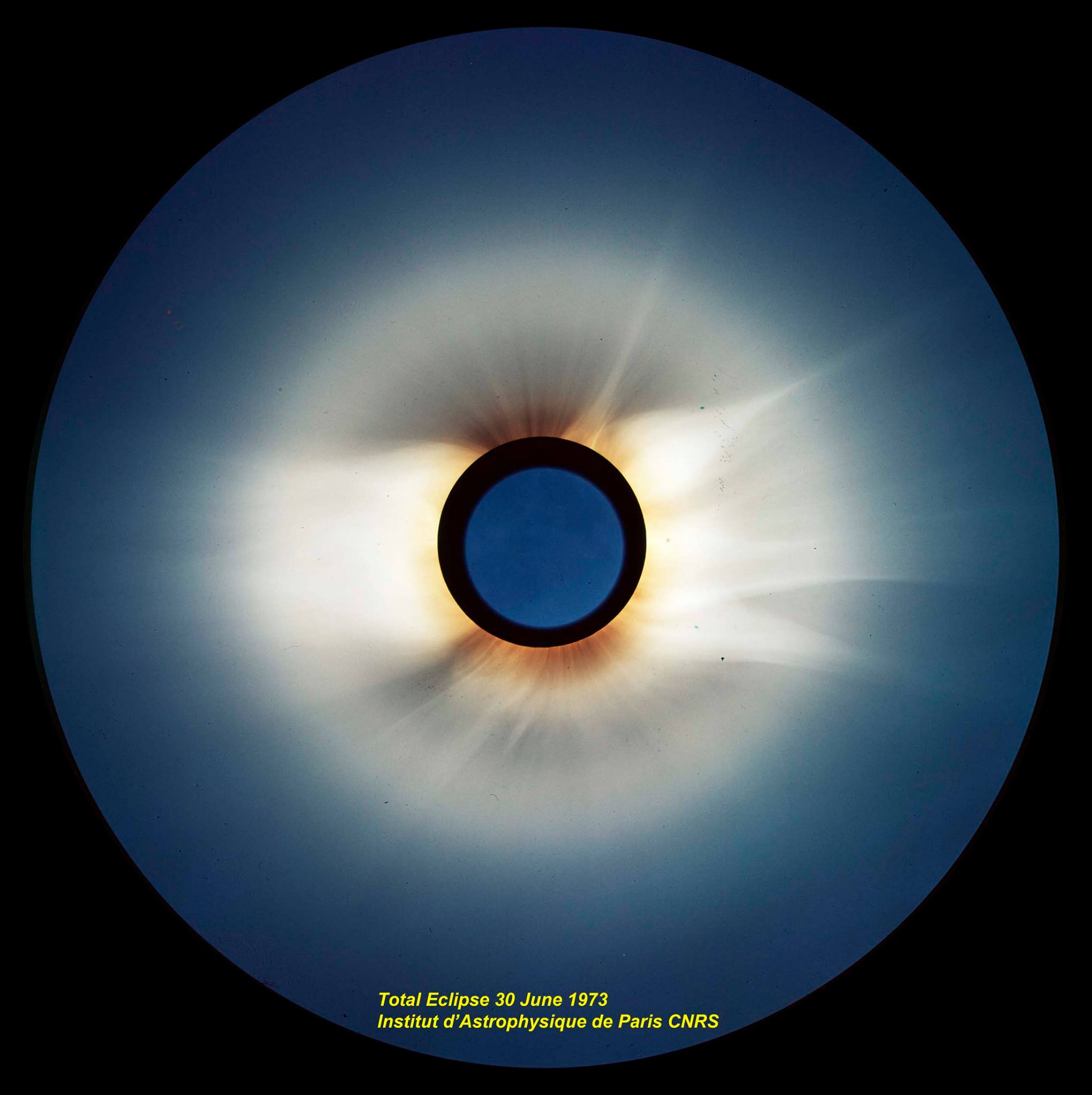
From Moussoro, Chad

== Eclipse details ==
Shown below are two tables displaying details about this particular solar eclipse. The first table outlines times at which the Moon's penumbra or umbra attains the specific parameter, and the second table describes various other parameters pertaining to this eclipse.

June 30, 1973 Solar Eclipse Times
Event	Time (UTC)
First Penumbral External Contact	1973 June 30 at 09:01:25.6 UTC
First Umbral External Contact	1973 June 30 at 09:54:30.6 UTC
First Central Line	1973 June 30 at 09:56:07.0 UTC
First Umbral Internal Contact	1973 June 30 at 09:57:43.4 UTC
First Penumbral Internal Contact	1973 June 30 at 10:51:03.8 UTC
Greatest Duration	1973 June 30 at 11:34:54.0 UTC
Greatest Eclipse	1973 June 30 at 11:38:40.6 UTC
Ecliptic Conjunction	1973 June 30 at 11:39:28.6 UTC
Equatorial Conjunction	1973 June 30 at 11:40:00.2 UTC
Last Penumbral Internal Contact	1973 June 30 at 12:26:15.2 UTC
Last Umbral Internal Contact	1973 June 30 at 13:19:37.6 UTC
Last Central Line	1973 June 30 at 13:21:13.4 UTC
Last Umbral External Contact	1973 June 30 at 13:22:49.2 UTC
Last Penumbral External Contact	1973 June 30 at 14:15:56.2 UTC

June 30, 1973 Solar Eclipse Parameters
Parameter	Value
Eclipse Magnitude	1.07921
Eclipse Obscuration	1.16470
Gamma	−0.07853
Sun Right Ascension	06h37m08.4s
Sun Declination	+23°10'06.4"
Sun Semi-Diameter	15'43.8"
Sun Equatorial Horizontal Parallax	08.6"
Moon Right Ascension	06h37m05.0s
Moon Declination	+23°05'22.3"
Moon Semi-Diameter	16'41.4"
Moon Equatorial Horizontal Parallax	1°01'15.1"
ΔT	43.9 s

== Eclipse season ==
This eclipse is part of an eclipse season, a period, roughly every six months, when eclipses occur. Only two (or occasionally three) eclipse seasons occur each year, and each season lasts about 35 days and repeats just short of six months (173 days) later; thus two full eclipse seasons always occur each year. Either two or three eclipses happen each eclipse season. In the sequence below, each eclipse is separated by a fortnight. The first and last eclipse in this sequence is separated by one synodic month.

Eclipse season of June–July 1973
June 15 Ascending node (full moon)	June 30 Descending node (new moon)	July 15 Ascending node (full moon)
Penumbral lunar eclipse Lunar Saros 110	Total solar eclipse Solar Saros 136	Penumbral lunar eclipse Lunar Saros 148

== Related eclipses ==
=== Eclipses in 1973 ===
- An annular solar eclipse on January 4.
- A penumbral lunar eclipse on January 18.
- A penumbral lunar eclipse on June 15.
- A total solar eclipse on June 30.
- A penumbral lunar eclipse on July 15.
- A partial lunar eclipse on December 10.
- An annular solar eclipse on December 24.

=== Metonic ===
- Preceded by: Solar eclipse of September 11, 1969
- Followed by: Solar eclipse of April 18, 1977

=== Tzolkinex ===
- Preceded by: Solar eclipse of May 20, 1966
- Followed by: Solar eclipse of August 10, 1980

=== Half-Saros ===
- Preceded by: Lunar eclipse of June 25, 1964
- Followed by: Lunar eclipse of July 6, 1982

=== Tritos ===
- Preceded by: Solar eclipse of July 31, 1962
- Followed by: Solar eclipse of May 30, 1984

=== Solar Saros 136 ===
- Preceded by: Solar eclipse of June 20, 1955
- Followed by: Solar eclipse of July 11, 1991

=== Inex ===
- Preceded by: Solar eclipse of July 20, 1944
- Followed by: Solar eclipse of June 10, 2002

=== Triad ===
- Preceded by: Solar eclipse of August 29, 1886
- Followed by: Solar eclipse of April 30, 2060

=== Solar eclipses of 1971–1974 ===
This eclipse is a member of a semester series. An eclipse in a semester series of solar eclipses repeats approximately every 177 days and 4 hours (a semester) at alternating nodes of the Moon's orbit.

The partial solar eclipses on February 25, 1971 and August 20, 1971 occur in the previous lunar year eclipse set.

Solar eclipse series sets from 1971 to 1974
Descending node			Ascending node		
Saros	Map	Gamma	Saros	Map	Gamma
116	July 22, 1971 Partial	1.513	121	January 16, 1972 Annular	−0.9365
126	July 10, 1972 Total	0.6872	131	January 4, 1973 Annular	−0.2644
136	June 30, 1973 Total	−0.0785	141	December 24, 1973 Annular	0.4171
146	June 20, 1974 Total	−0.8239	151	December 13, 1974 Partial	1.0797

=== Saros 136 ===
This eclipse is a part of Saros series 136, repeating every 18 years, 11 days, and containing 71 events. The series started with a partial solar eclipse on June 14, 1360. It contains annular eclipses from September 8, 1504 through November 12, 1594; hybrid eclipses from November 22, 1612 through January 17, 1703; and total eclipses from January 27, 1721 through May 13, 2496. The series ends at member 71 as a partial eclipse on July 30, 2622. Its eclipses are tabulated in three columns; every third eclipse in the same column is one exeligmos apart, so they all cast shadows over approximately the same parts of the Earth.

The longest duration of annularity was produced by member 9 at 32 seconds on September 8, 1504, and the longest duration of totality was produced by member 34 at 7 minutes, 7.74 seconds on June 20, 1955. All eclipses in this series occur at the Moon’s descending node of orbit.

Series members 26–47 occur between 1801 and 2200:
26	27	28
March 24, 1811	April 3, 1829	April 15, 1847
29	30	31
April 25, 1865	May 6, 1883	May 18, 1901
32	33	34
May 29, 1919	June 8, 1937	June 20, 1955
35	36	37
June 30, 1973	July 11, 1991	July 22, 2009
38	39	40
August 2, 2027	August 12, 2045	August 24, 2063
41	42	43
September 3, 2081	September 14, 2099	September 26, 2117
44	45	46
October 7, 2135	October 17, 2153	October 29, 2171
47
November 8, 2189

=== Metonic series ===
The metonic series repeats eclipses every 19 years (6939.69 days), lasting about 5 cycles. Eclipses occur in nearly the same calendar date. In addition, the octon subseries repeats 1/5 of that or every 3.8 years (1387.94 days). All eclipses in this table occur at the Moon's descending node.

22 eclipse events between September 12, 1931 and July 1, 2011
September 11–12	June 30–July 1	April 17–19	February 4–5	November 22–23
114	116	118	120	122
September 12, 1931	June 30, 1935	April 19, 1939	February 4, 1943	November 23, 1946
124	126	128	130	132
September 12, 1950	June 30, 1954	April 19, 1958	February 5, 1962	November 23, 1965
134	136	138	140	142
September 11, 1969	June 30, 1973	April 18, 1977	February 4, 1981	November 22, 1984
144	146	148	150	152
September 11, 1988	June 30, 1992	April 17, 1996	February 5, 2000	November 23, 2003
154	156			
September 11, 2007	July 1, 2011			

=== Tritos series ===
This eclipse is a part of a tritos cycle, repeating at alternating nodes every 135 synodic months (≈ 3986.63 days, or 11 years minus 1 month). Their appearance and longitude are irregular due to a lack of synchronization with the anomalistic month (period of perigee), but groupings of 3 tritos cycles (≈ 33 years minus 3 months) come close (≈ 434.044 anomalistic months), so eclipses are similar in these groupings.

Series members between 1801 and 2200
October 9, 1809 (Saros 121)	September 7, 1820 (Saros 122)	August 7, 1831 (Saros 123)	July 8, 1842 (Saros 124)	June 6, 1853 (Saros 125)
May 6, 1864 (Saros 126)	April 6, 1875 (Saros 127)	March 5, 1886 (Saros 128)	February 1, 1897 (Saros 129)	January 3, 1908 (Saros 130)
December 3, 1918 (Saros 131)	November 1, 1929 (Saros 132)	October 1, 1940 (Saros 133)	September 1, 1951 (Saros 134)	July 31, 1962 (Saros 135)
June 30, 1973 (Saros 136)	May 30, 1984 (Saros 137)	April 29, 1995 (Saros 138)	March 29, 2006 (Saros 139)	February 26, 2017 (Saros 140)
January 26, 2028 (Saros 141)	December 26, 2038 (Saros 142)	November 25, 2049 (Saros 143)	October 24, 2060 (Saros 144)	September 23, 2071 (Saros 145)
August 24, 2082 (Saros 146)	July 23, 2093 (Saros 147)	June 22, 2104 (Saros 148)	May 24, 2115 (Saros 149)	April 22, 2126 (Saros 150)
March 21, 2137 (Saros 151)	February 19, 2148 (Saros 152)	January 19, 2159 (Saros 153)	December 18, 2169 (Saros 154)	November 17, 2180 (Saros 155)
October 18, 2191 (Saros 156)

=== Inex series ===
This eclipse is a part of the long period inex cycle, repeating at alternating nodes, every 358 synodic months (≈ 10,571.95 days, or 29 years minus 20 days). Their appearance and longitude are irregular due to a lack of synchronization with the anomalistic month (period of perigee). However, groupings of 3 inex cycles (≈ 87 years minus 2 months) comes close (≈ 1,151.02 anomalistic months), so eclipses are similar in these groupings.

Series members between 1801 and 2200
October 9, 1828 (Saros 131)	September 18, 1857 (Saros 132)	August 29, 1886 (Saros 133)
August 10, 1915 (Saros 134)	July 20, 1944 (Saros 135)	June 30, 1973 (Saros 136)
June 10, 2002 (Saros 137)	May 21, 2031 (Saros 138)	April 30, 2060 (Saros 139)
April 10, 2089 (Saros 140)	March 22, 2118 (Saros 141)	March 2, 2147 (Saros 142)
February 10, 2176 (Saros 143)		
