= Jean-Paul Troadec =

- Born: 14 October 1948 (age 77); Saint-Renan, Finistère
- Education: Aerospace engineer
- Alma mater: École polytechnique École nationale de l'aviation civile
- Occupation: President of the Bureau d'Enquêtes et d'Analyses pour la Sécurité de l'Aviation Civile
- Employer: Bureau d'Enquêtes et d'Analyses pour la Sécurité de l'Aviation Civile
- Known for: President of the Bureau d'Enquêtes et d'Analyses pour la Sécurité de l'Aviation Civile
- Predecessor: Paul-Louis Arslanian
- Spouse: Married
- Children: 3 children

Jean-Paul Troadec (born October 14, 1948 in Saint-Renan, Finistère, France) is a French aerospace engineer and public servant. He is the former President of the French Bureau d'Enquêtes et d'Analyses pour la Sécurité de l'Aviation Civile, the country's aviation accident investigation bureau.

== Biography ==
Troadec graduated from École polytechnique (X 67) and École nationale de l'aviation civile (IAC 70) and started his career in 1972 as an engineer at the certification office of the Direction générale de l'aviation civile. In 1975, he became head of the "engine and research" department. In 1980, he moved to the "approval of equipment, pollution and noise measurements" department before becoming head of the Airbus engine and CFM56 department. From 1985 till 1993, he was head of the Service d'exploitation de la formation aéronautique. In 1993, he was appointed head of the air traffic department. Then, until 2002, he was head of the human resources department. In 2002, he joined the French government's Ministry of Ecology, Sustainable Development, Transport and Housing.

He was nominated President of the Bureau d'Enquêtes et d'Analyses pour la Sécurité de l'Aviation Civile in 2009, succeeding Paul-Louis Arslanian.

== Aeronautical qualifications ==
- Military parachute licence
- Commercial pilot licence Instrument Rating (multi engine)

== Awards ==
- Chevalier of the Légion d'honneur
- Officier of the Ordre national du Mérite
- Médaille de l'Aéronautique

== Bibliography ==
- Académie nationale de l'air et de l'espace and Lucien Robineau, Les français du ciel, dictionnaire historique, Le Cherche midi, June 2005, 782 p. (ISBN 2-7491-0415-7)
