= Musée de l'air et de l'espace =

Musée de l'Air et de l'Espace
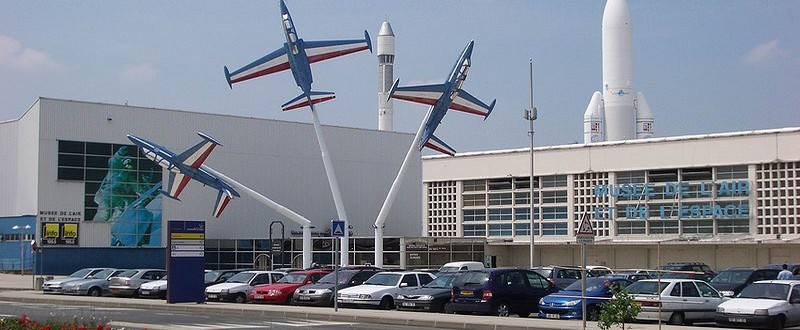
- Established: 1919
- Location: Paris – Le Bourget Airport; Le Bourget, France
- Coordinates: 48°56′50″N 2°26′6″E
- Type: Aviation museum
- Website: museeairespace.fr

The Musée de l'air et de l'espace (French pronunciation: [myze də lɛʁ e də lɛspas], lit. 'Air and Space Museum') is a French aerospace museum, located at the south-eastern edge of Paris–Le Bourget Airport, north of Paris, and in the commune of Le Bourget. It was inaugurated in 1919 after a proposal by the celebrated aeronautics engineer Albert Caquot (1881–1976).

== Description ==
Occupying over 1.5 sq km of land and hangars, it is one of the oldest aviation museums in the world. The museum's collection contains more than 19,595 items, including 150 aircraft, and material from as far back as the 16th century. Also displayed are more modern air and spacecraft, including the prototype for Concorde, and Swiss and Soviet rockets. The museum also has the only known remaining piece — the jettisoned main landing gear — of L'Oiseau Blanc (The White Bird), the 1927 aircraft which attempted to make the first transatlantic crossing from Paris to New York. On 8 May 1927 Charles Nungesser and François Coli aboard L'Oiseau blanc, a 450-hp Lorraine-powered Levasseur biplane took off from Le Bourget. The aircraft jettisoned its main landing gear (which is stored at the museum), which it was designed to do as part of its transatlantic flight profile, but then disappeared over the Atlantic, only two weeks before Lindbergh's monoplane completed its successful solo non-stop transatlantic flight to Le Bourget from the United States.

Other items of interest include:

- gilded bronze medallion of the Montgolfier brothers, created in 1783 by Jean-Antoine Houdon (1741–1828)
- the Biot-Massia glider (1879)
- an 1884 electric motor by Arthur Constantin Krebs (1850–1935)
- the rear gondola of the 1915 Zeppelin LZ 113, equipped with 3 Maybach type HS engines
- a 1916 SPAD VII aircraft by Blériot-SPAD and flown by French flying ace Georges Guynemer in World War I
- a 1917 Airco DH.9 aircraft by Geoffrey de Havilland (1882–1965)
- a 1918 Junkers D.I aircraft by Hugo Junkers (1859–1935)
- a 1961 Dassault Mirage IIIC by Marcel Dassault (1892–1986)
- an SSBS S3 surface-to-surface ballistic missile commissioned in 1981
- The original Soyuz T-6 reentry capsule used by the first French astronaut Jean-Loup Chrétien in 1982
- a 2002 Dassault-Breguet Super Étendard model

== History ==
The museum completed a new 3,000 m^{2} (32,000 sq ft) storage hangar in 2024.

== Aircraft on display ==
=== Grand Gallery ===
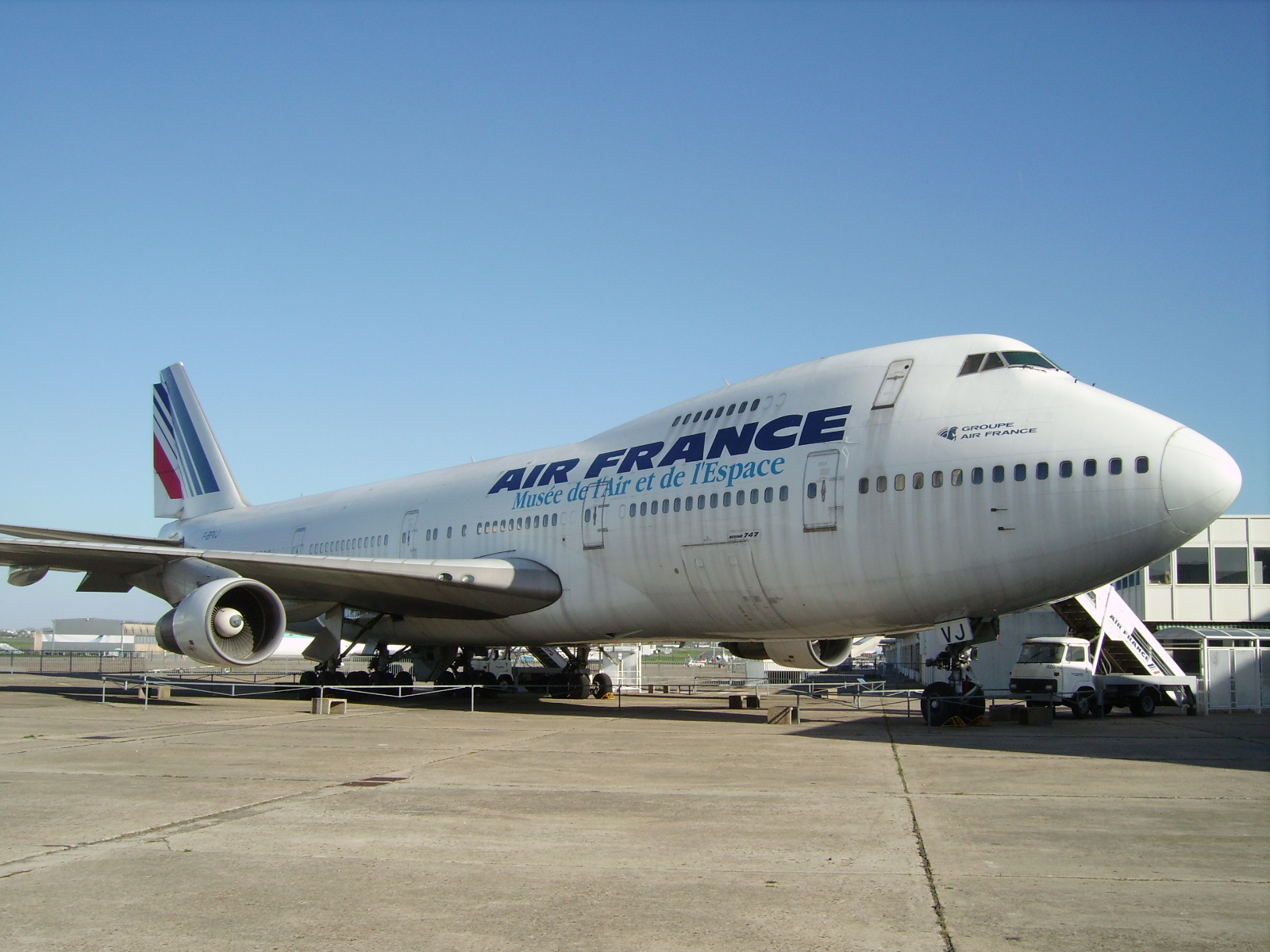
Boeing 747

- Antoinette VII
- Blériot XI
- Voisin-Farman No 1
- Santos-Dumont Demoiselle

=== Between the Wars and Light Aviation Hall ===
- Bréguet 14
- Caudron C.630 Simoun
- Farman Goliath
- Nieuport 11

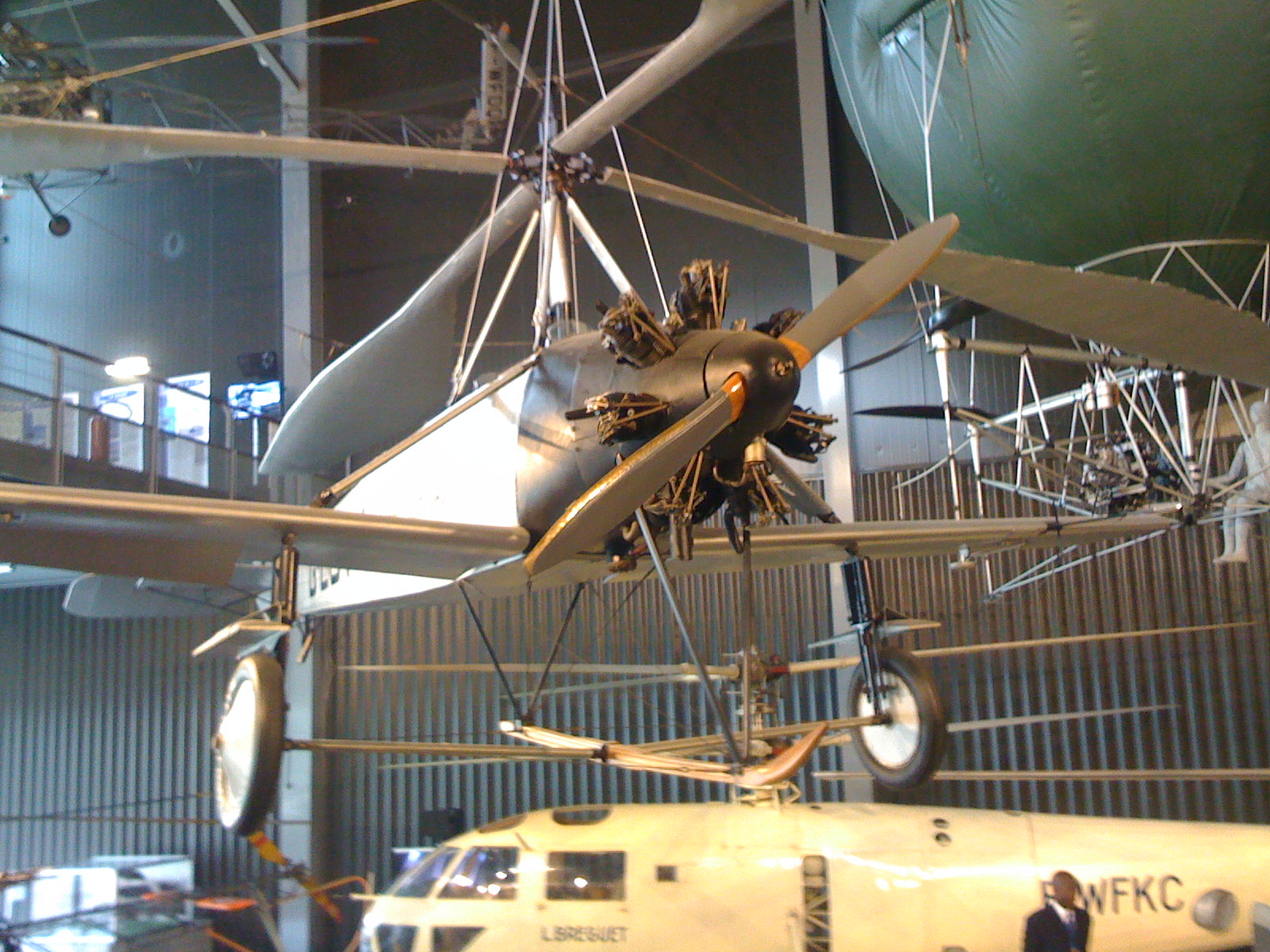
Cierva C.8 Autogiro

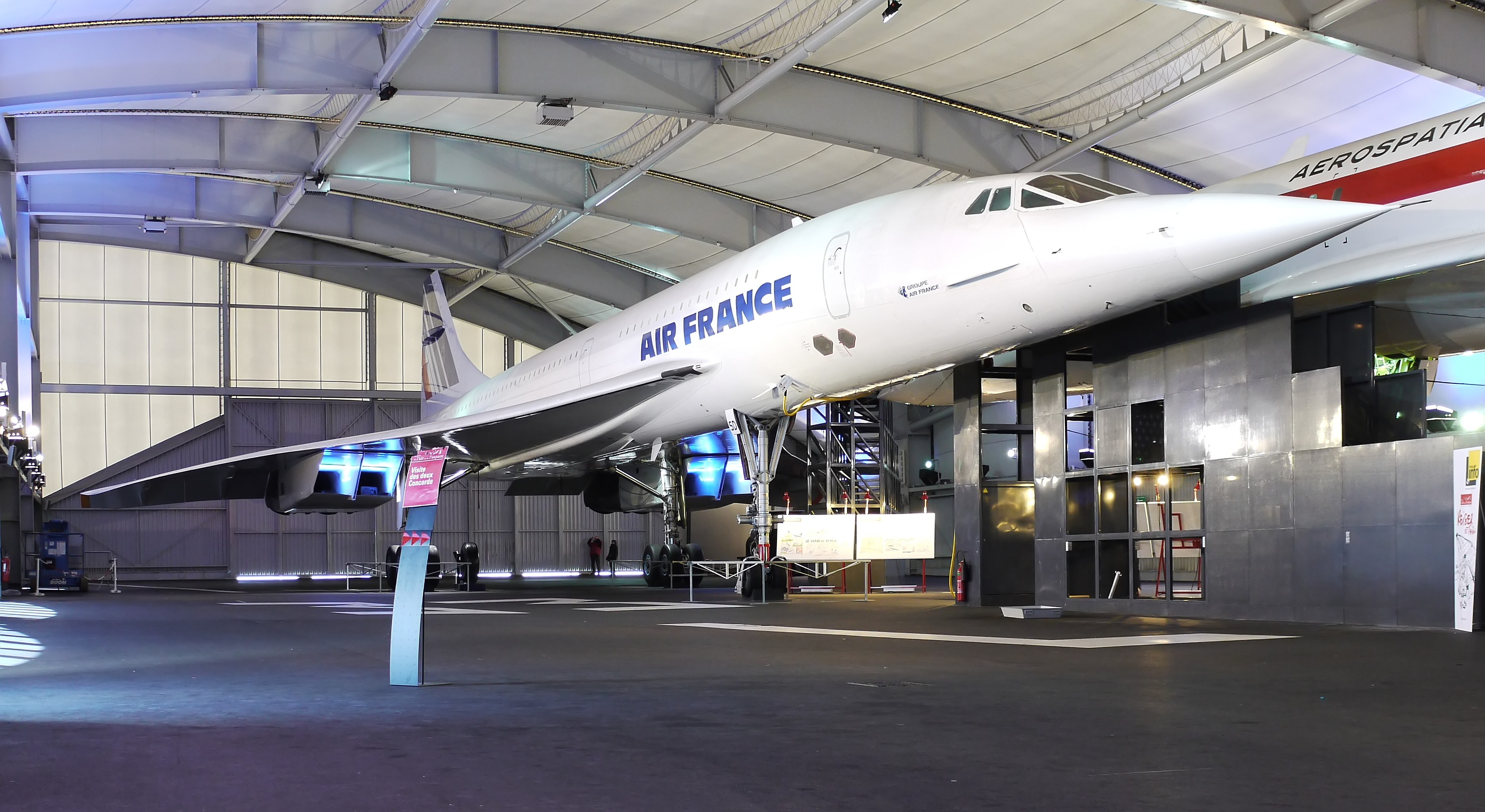
Concorde

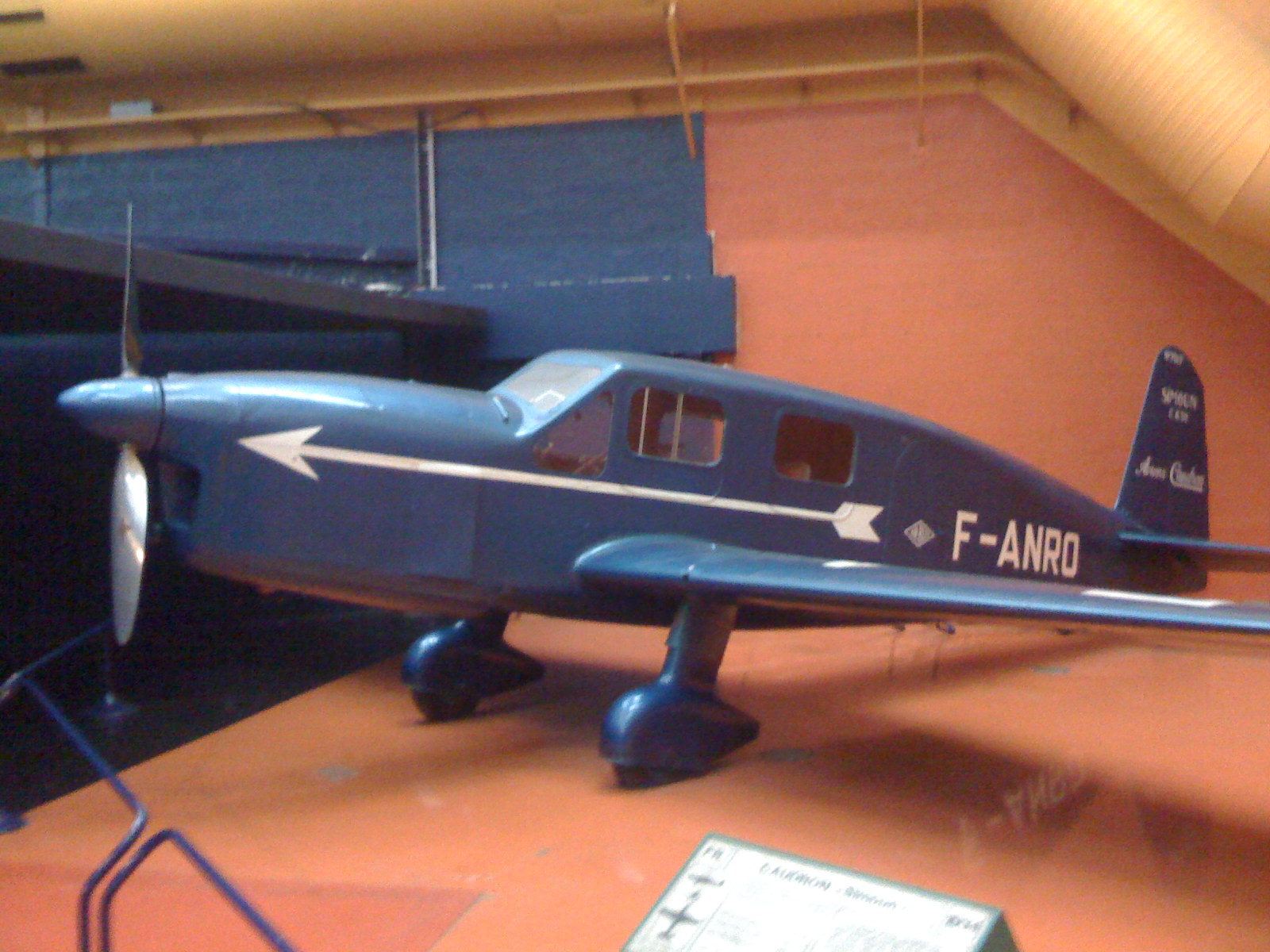
Caudron Simoun

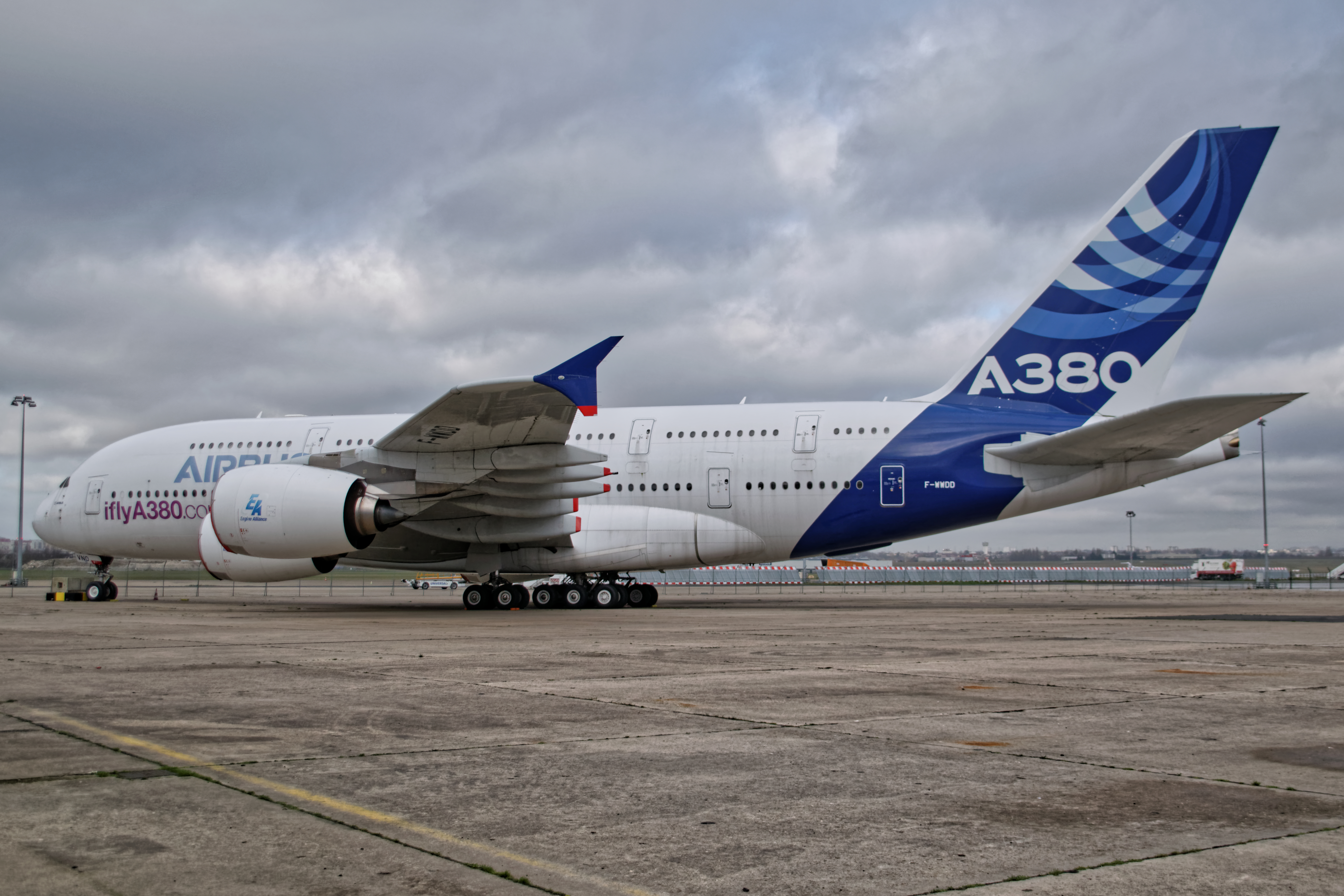
A380, MSN F-WWDD.

- Oiseau Blanc
- Potez 53

=== World War II Hall ===
- Bücker Bü 181
- Dewoitine D.520
- Douglas A-1 Skyraider
- Douglas C-47 Skytrain
- Douglas DC-3 cockpit
- Focke-Wulf Fw 190
- North American P-51 Mustang
- Republic P-47 Thunderbolt
- Supermarine Spitfire Mk XVI
- V-1 flying bomb

=== Roundel Hall ===
- Dassault Mirage III
- Dassault Mystère IV
- Dassault Ouragan
- North American F-86D Sabre
- North American F-100 Super Sabre
- Republic F-84 Thunderjet

=== Prototype Hall ===
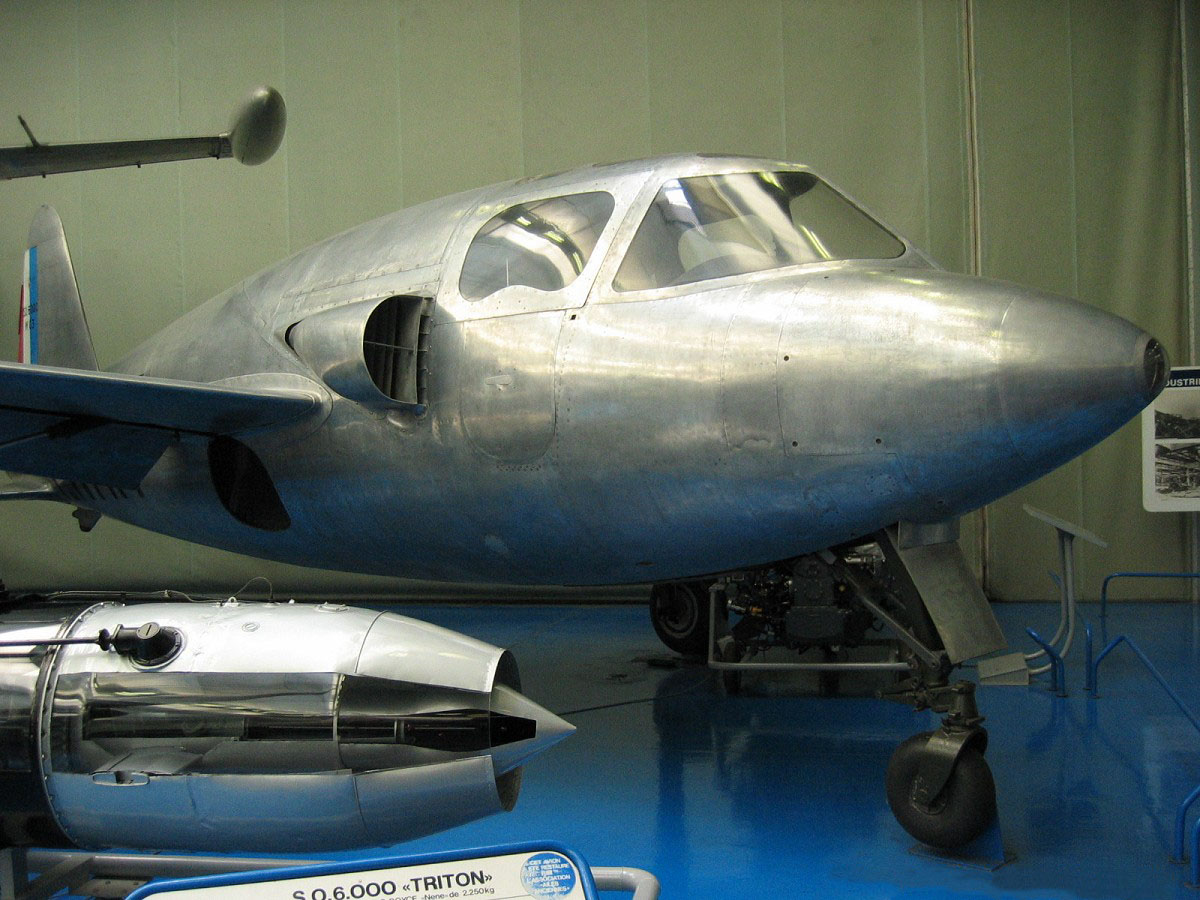
SO.6000 Triton n°3.

- Aérospatiale Ludion
- Dassault Balzac V
- Leduc 0.10
- Nord 1500 Griffon
- SNCASO Trident
- Sud-Ouest SO.6000 Triton

=== Concorde Hall ===
- Concorde (two, F-WTSS prototype and Air France F-BTSD)
  Concorde 001 is featured in its 1973 Solar Eclipse mission livery, with the special rooftop portholes visible.
- Dassault Mirage IV. The plane number 9 (F-THAH) was used to drop a live nuclear bomb during the Tamouré nuclear test in 1966.
- Dassault Mirage 4000
- Eurocopter X3
- Sud Aviation Caravelle forward fuselage

=== Tarmac/Exterior Exhibit ===
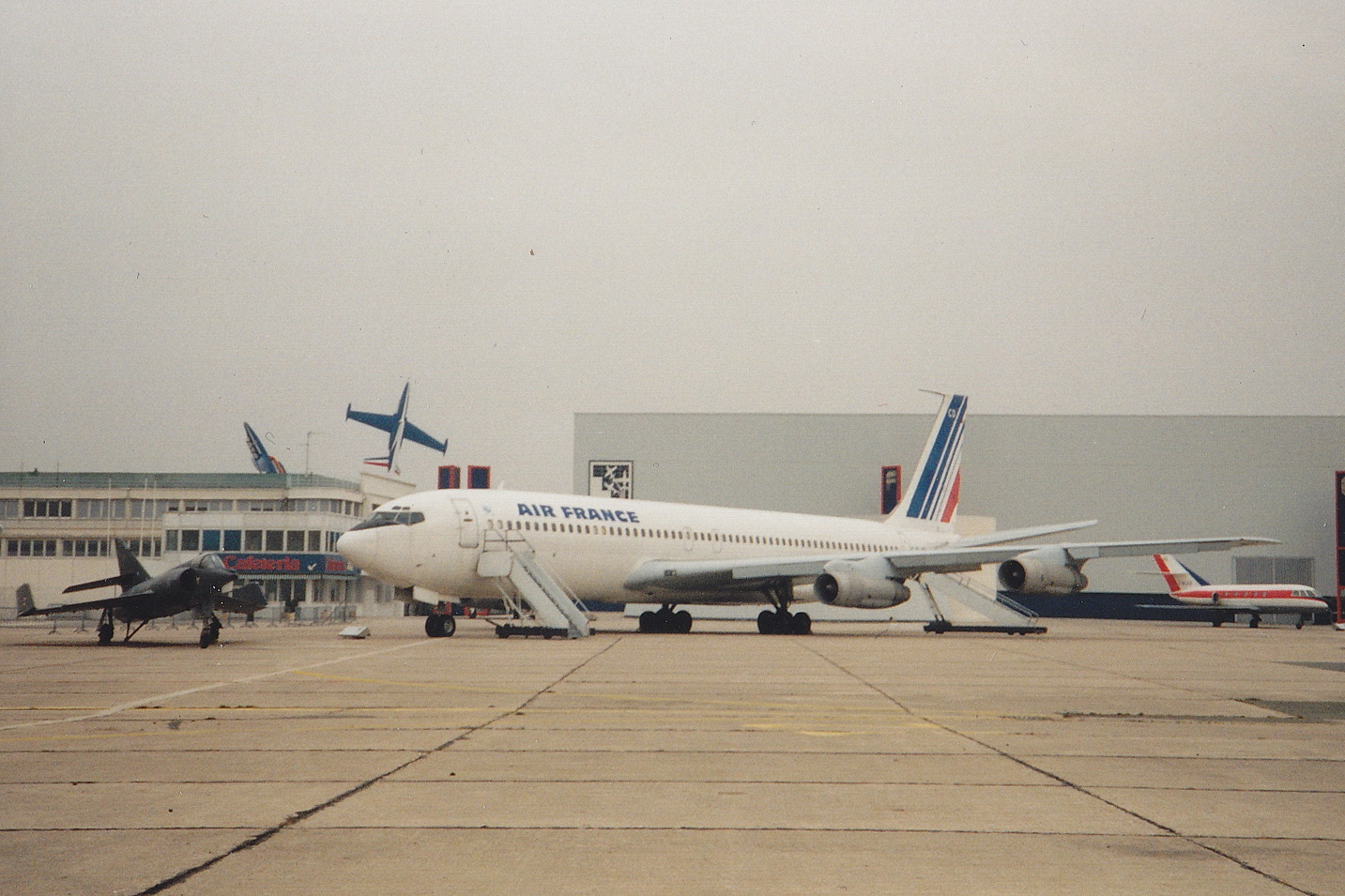
Boeing 707

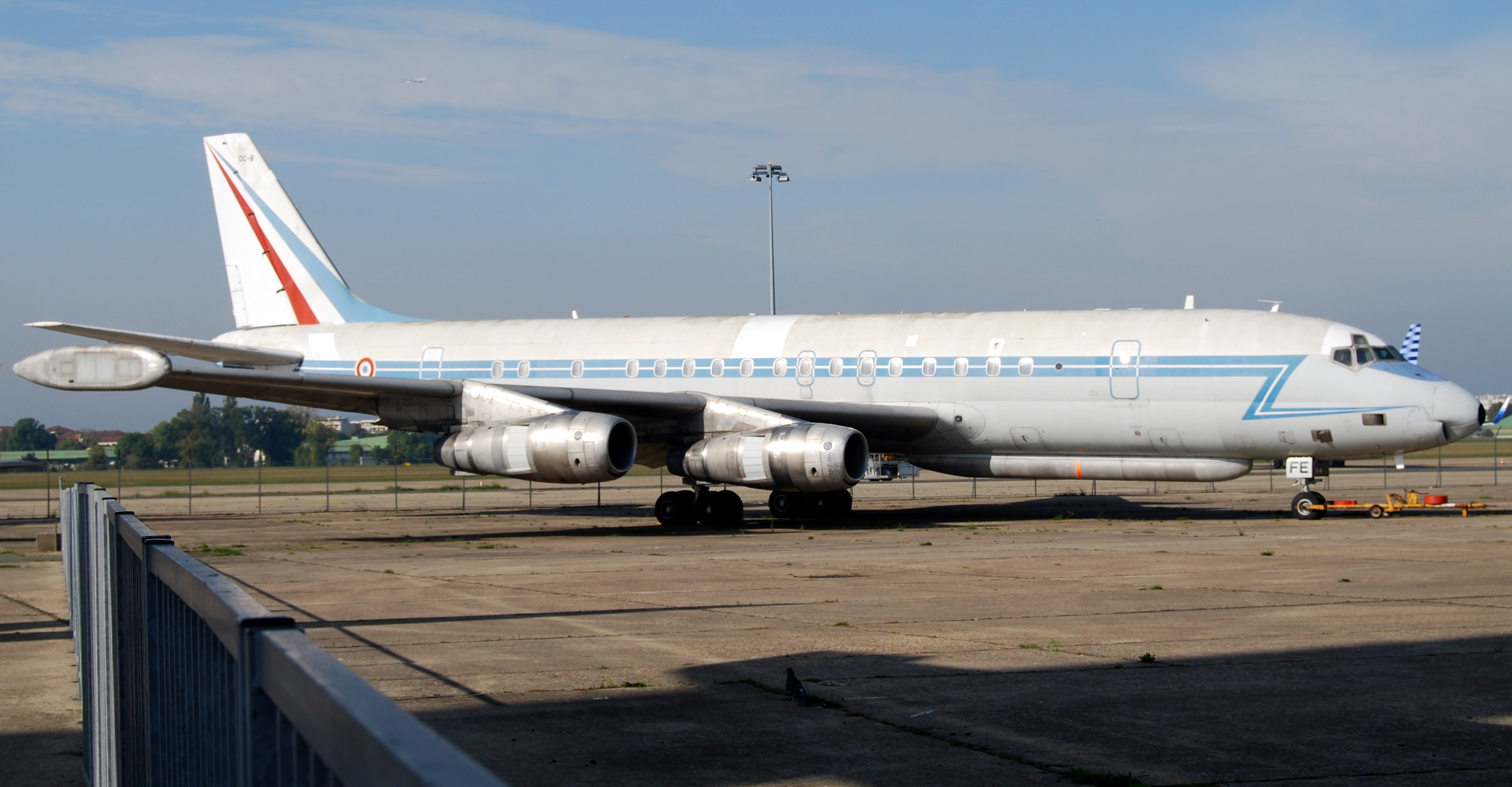
Douglas DC-8

- Boeing 707
- Boeing 747
- Ariane 1 (model)
- Ariane 5 (model)
- Airbus A380
- Douglas DC-8
- Canadair CL-215
- Lockheed P-2 Neptune
- Breguet Atlantic
- Dassault Mercure
- Transall C-160
- Dassault Super Etendard
- SEPECAT Jaguar
- Dassault Mirage 4000
- Dassault Rafale A

== See also ==
- List of aerospace museums
- List of museums in Paris
