= Solar eclipses in visual art =

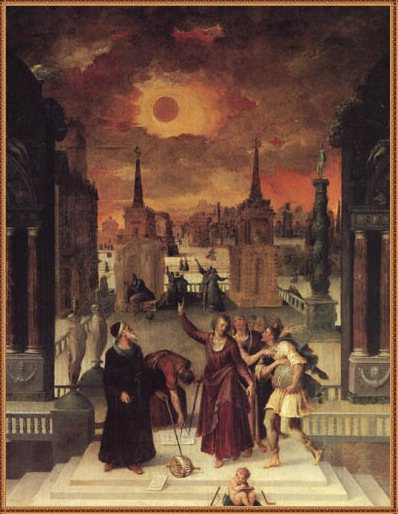
Dionysius the Areopagite Converting the Pagan Philosophers, Antoine Caron's 1570s depiction of a solar eclipse and human reactions

Solar eclipses are a recurring subject of painting, illustration, and photography. Total solar eclipses, where the Sun is completely blocked out by the Moon, allowing the solar corona to become visible, may have been a subject of visual depictions since prehistory. Early rock-carvings of eclipses are difficult to verify because the intention behind such creations is unknowable. Eclipses have been part of mythology for all of human history and visual motifs of deities consuming or destroying the sun are common across many cultures.

Astronomical diagrams of solar eclipses were produced in the medieval Islamic world and during the Renaissance in Europe. The subject intermittently appeared in Christian art in the early modern period with varying levels of accuracy. Solar eclipses became a common theme in images of the crucifixion of Jesus during the Catholic Revival in the 17th century, as an interpretation of the crucifixion darkness described in the synoptic Gospels.

Astronomical illustrations of solar eclipses became increasingly common during the Age of Enlightenment and they began to become subject to political and comedic cartoons. Romantic paintings of solar eclipses maximized the atmospheric impact of the subject. In the 20th century, artistic representations of eclipses became increasingly abstract and stylized.

Scientific interest in eclipses was revolutionized with photographic technologies developed in the 19th century. Taking photographs of totality was a time-consuming and error-prone activity which slowly matured. In the 1920s and 1930s, artist Howard Russell Butler produced a set of richly detailed paintings of solar eclipses which rivaled photographic documentation at the time. Modern eclipse photography is highly advanced, capturing more detail than is visible by the naked eye.

== Prehistory and antiquity ==
Ancestral Puebloan petroglyph possibly depicting the 1097 solar eclipse.

Very few prehistoric depictions of solar eclipses have been found. Some experts suggest this may be because solar eclipses were regarded as bad omens by many ancient civilizations, and Karl Kusserow of Princeton University said that rock carving was a laborious effort for drawing "the worst of all times." Archaeoastronomer Paul Griffin suggested that stonecarvings of concentric circles at the Loughcrew site in Ireland could be a depiction of a 3340 BC solar eclipse. However, other researchers responded that a total eclipse above the region could not be confirmed and that the carvings are impossible to interpret confidently as an artistic representation through a modern lens, especially because such concentric circles were a pre-existing motif in Neolithic tombs.

An Ancestral Puebloan petroglyph resembling a coronal mass ejection was discovered in Chaco Canyon in 1992. Archaeoastronomer Kim Malville connected the carving with the solar eclipse of July 11, 1097, which passed over the pueblos. The Sun was at a maximum of its magnetic activity, which makes an occurrence of coronal mass ejection more likely. Malville suggested that this depiction would indicate a positive relationship with solar eclipses.

Within Norse mythology, solar eclipses were depicted as the wolves Sköll and Hati chasing the Sun and Moon across the sky. Within Chinese mythology, solar eclipses were depicted as a dragon or Tiangou devouring the Sun. The immortal severed head Rāhu briefly consuming the Sun is a recurring motif to represent eclipses in Hindu and Buddhist cultures, his hands grasping the Sun or Moon. In this story, the Sun can only briefly be contained by Rahu's head before being released through the neck hole.

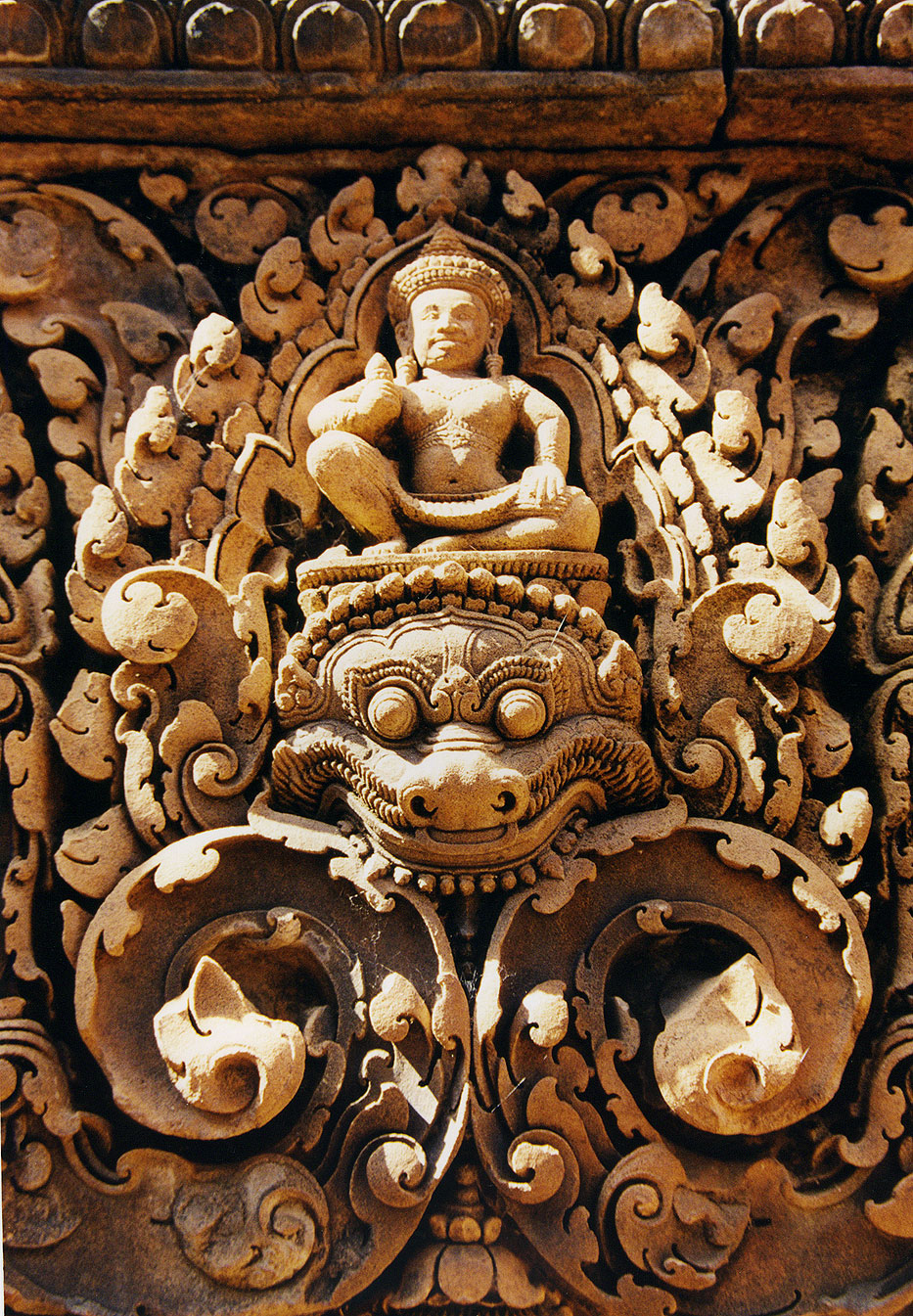
10th century sculpture of Rahu at Banteay Srei, Cambodia

Mural of Rahu at Wat Phang La in Thailand

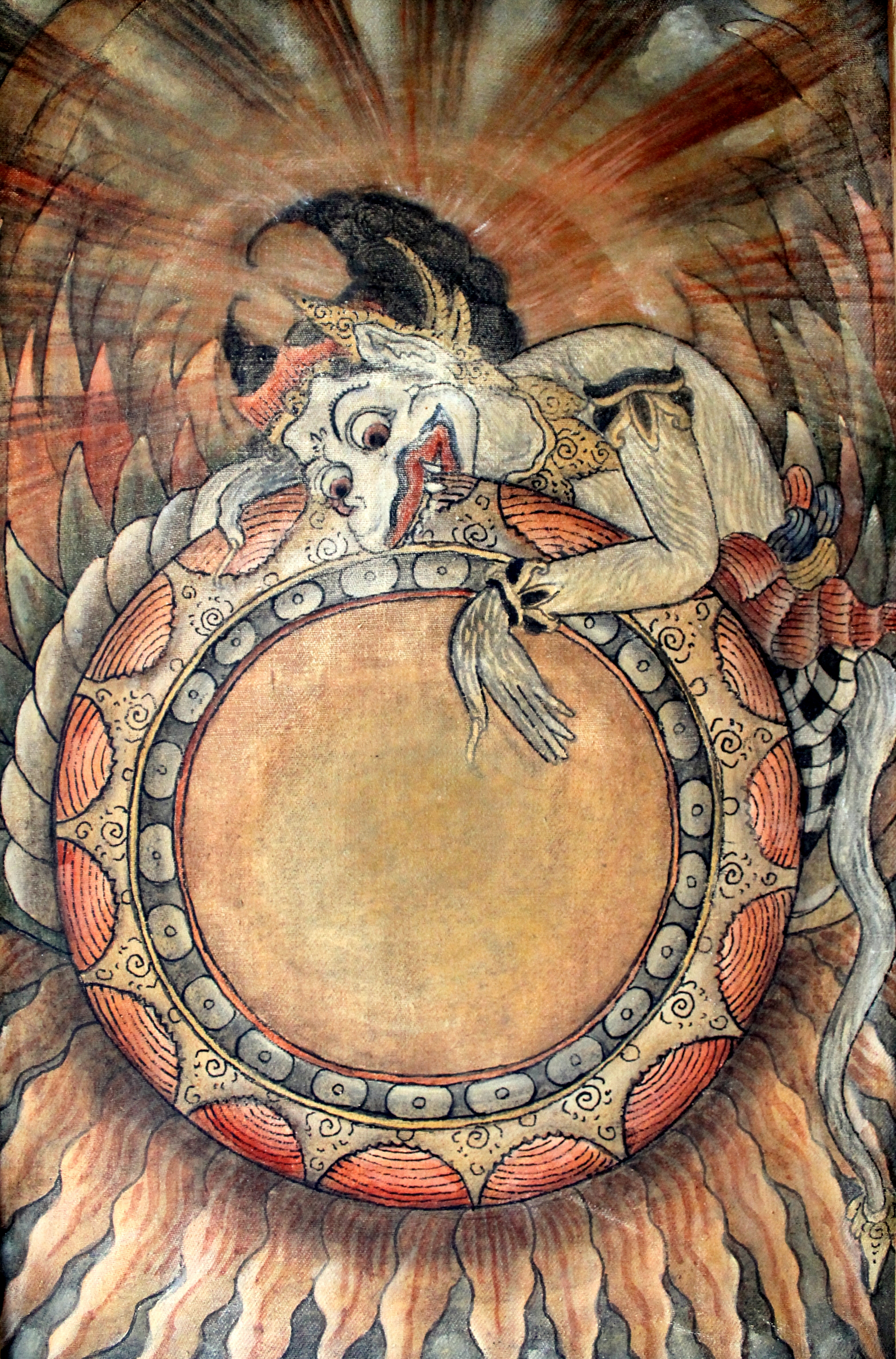
Modern watercolor painting of Rahu from Indonesia

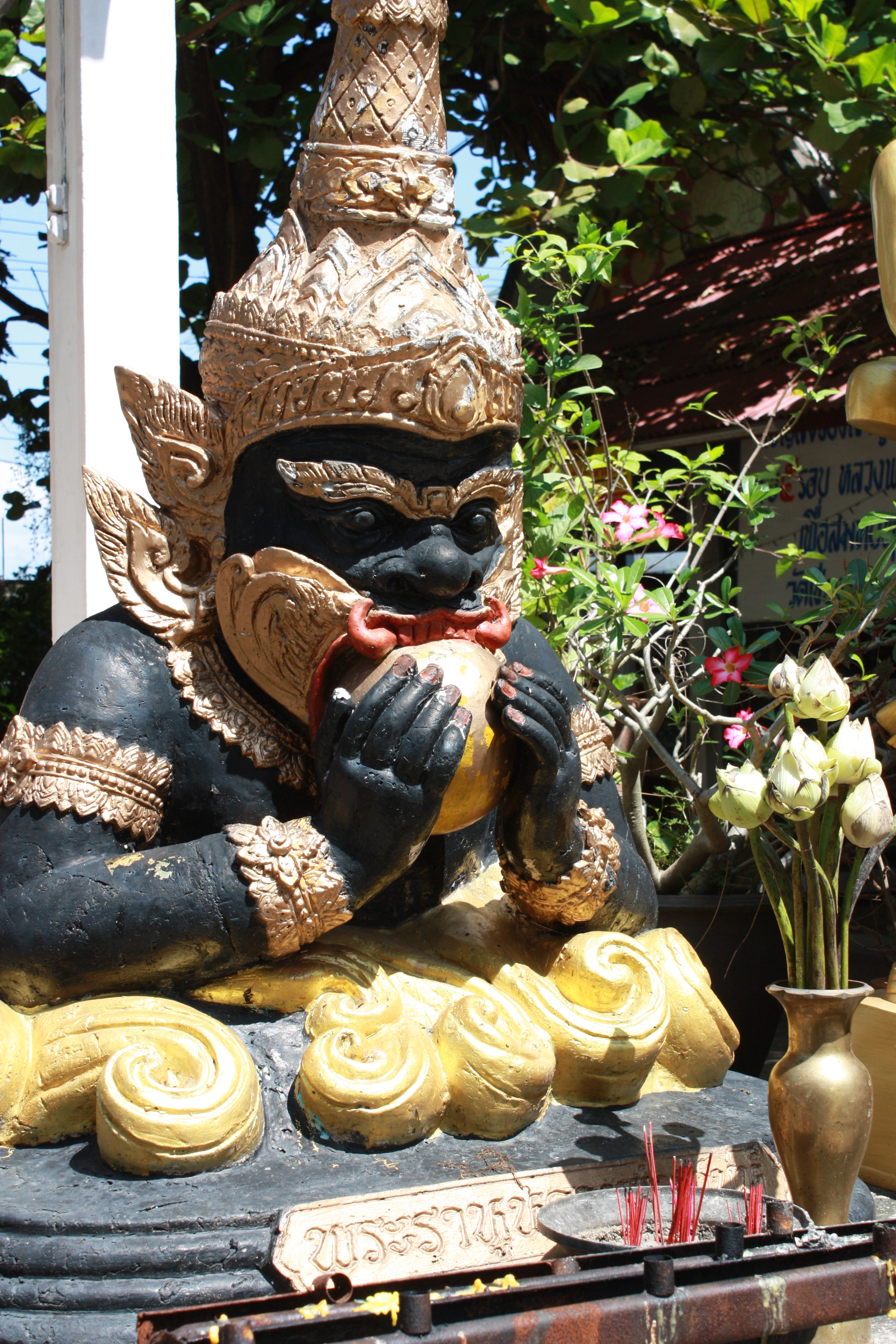
Modern depiction of Rahu in Thailand

== Late medieval and early modern depictions ==
Sky detail of a 1450s Valencian crucifixion scene painting

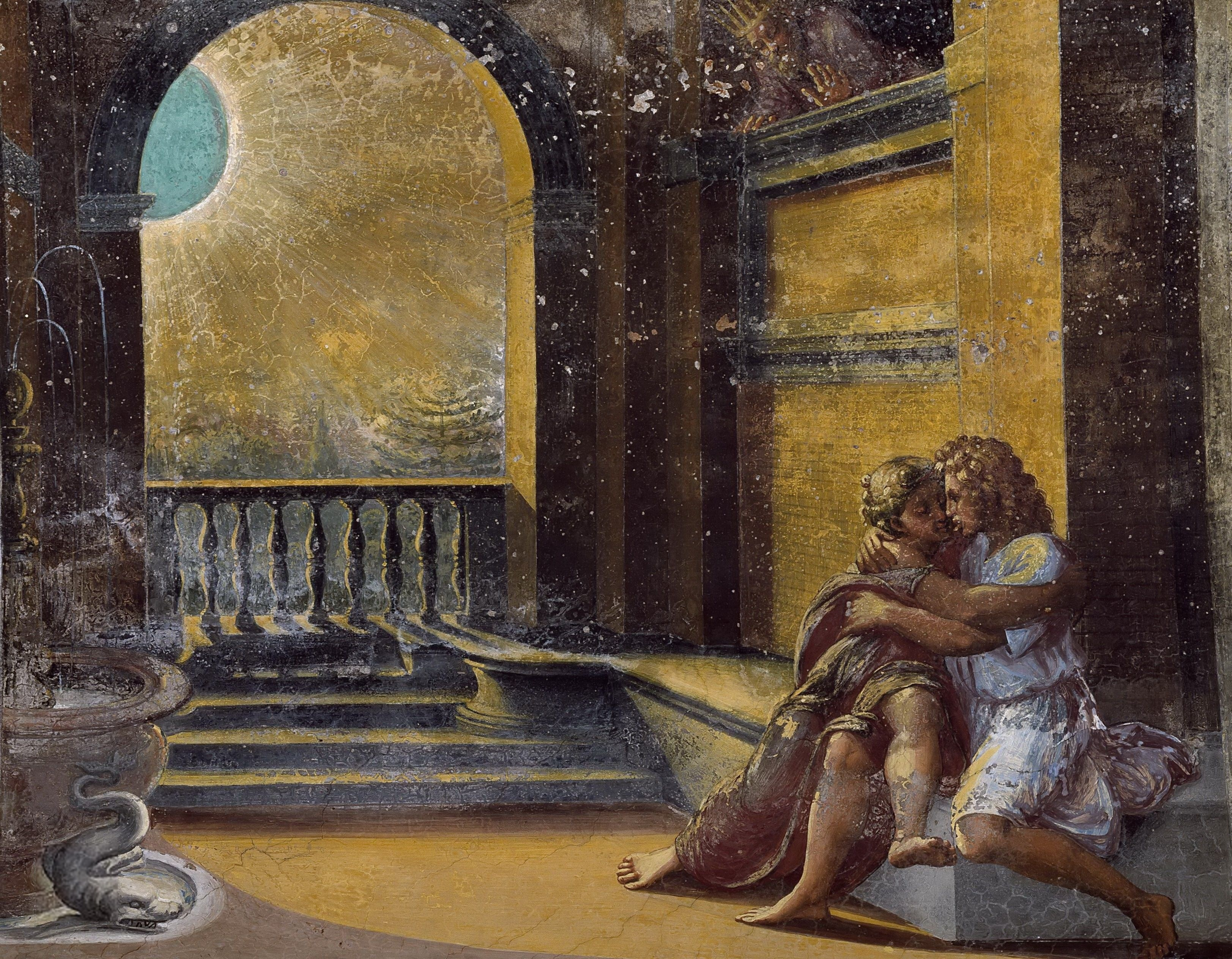
Raphael's 1518 fresco of Isaac and Rebecca Spied upon by Abimelech

The "crucifixion darkness" during the crucifixion of Jesus described by the biblical gospels is popularly interpreted to refer to a total solar eclipse, but Medieval artists typically depicted the event with the sun and the moon separate, one on either side of Jesus. This depiction allows for multiple interpretations, including representing Christ as "ruler of the cosmos." Taddeo Gaddi first explicitly suggested a solar eclipse in a triptych of the crucifixion as a dark blue wedge rimmed with silver. His Annunciation to the Shep-herds fresco represents divine radiance with an effect likely reminiscent of the 1330 total solar eclipse, which had left him partly blind. One unidentified Valencian artist painted the crucifixion of Jesus with a ochre-toned sun ca. 1450-1460, but this depiction interestingly doesn't feature a significantly darker sky, suggesting the artist had never seen a total solar eclipse.

Some of the first astronomical diagrams of a solar eclipse were published during the Renaissance period. The 1476 Kalendarium by Regiomontanus depicts multiple phases of a solar eclipse, and Georg von Peuerbach's Theorica Novae Planetarium contains diagrams explaining the mechanics that cause solar eclipses, showing the Sun, Earth, and Moon system in a single line. The artists for these illustrations are unknown. Giorgione painted diagrams of a solar and lunar eclipse in fresco, with details possibly sourced from the Kalendarium. An early manuscript of Aja'ib al-Makhluqat from 1280 includes a diagram of a solar eclipse, which was transformed with decorative embellishments in a 1717 edition.

Raphael's workshop produced a fresco titled Isaac and Rebecca Spied upon by Abimelech for the Vatican's Apostolic Palace in 1518. Depicting a segment from Genesis 26:8 wherein Isaac embraces Rebecca, the scene is dominated by an immense solar eclipse visible through a window. Raphael likely witnessed the 1518 annular eclipse, but his workshop rendered a distinct corona which should not have been visible during an annular eclipse. This detail on the fresco suggests Raphael was advised by scientists of the Papacy. It was described as a "revolutionary illustration of a solar eclipse" by Princeton University.

The Augsburg Book of Miracles, produced in 16th century Germany, includes several illustrations of solar eclipses. One image depicts a total solar eclipse alongside a locust swarm, a combination of miraculous events it claims had occurred in 1483. An image of a solar eclipse is included in the 1577 Codex Florentine.

Antoine Caron produced Dionysius the Areopagite Converting the Pagan Philosophers in the 1570s, possibly inspired by 1571 and 1574 solar eclipses. The painting is a chaotic scene with various figures responding to a black disc in the sky and a blood rain-like effect. While centered on Dionysius the Areopagite converting those around him to Christianity, the painting includes a group of astronomers recording and analyzing the event. The piece is known under the alternative title "Astronomers Observing a Solar Eclipse: A Celestial Globe, an Armillary Sphere and a Figure Making Geometrical Calculations."

The image of a partial eclipse in crucifixion scenes became prominent during the Catholic Revival, as a vivid image of a divine will in action. Peter Paul Rubens included a partial eclipse in the third panel of the 1610 triptych The Elevation of the Cross. The scene is dramatic and Rubens applied significant originality in the presentation of the eclipse compared to previous works. Hendrick Ter Brugghen's 1625 Crucifixion with the Virgin and St John is notable for suggesting an eclipse through convincing contrasting light, though it doesn't feature an eclipsed disc. This depiction may have been inspired by the total solar eclipse of 1605, or the annular eclipse of 1621. Partial eclipses were also included in Philippe de Champaigne's 1655 Crucifixion scene and in José de Ribera's 1643 painting Cristo Crocifisso, in which the moon is translucent. Rubens and others rendered the entire outline of the Moon visible so viewers could clearly recognize it, though the Moon itself should not be visible during a partial solar eclipse.

Nature noted a painting by Cosmas Damian Asam for the Weltenburg monastery in 1735 as the "first relatively faithful representation of the 'diamond-ring effect'," with Saint Benedict confronting the light bursting from the lunar disc. Asam likely saw the total eclipse of 1733 and might have consulted Edmond Halley about it.

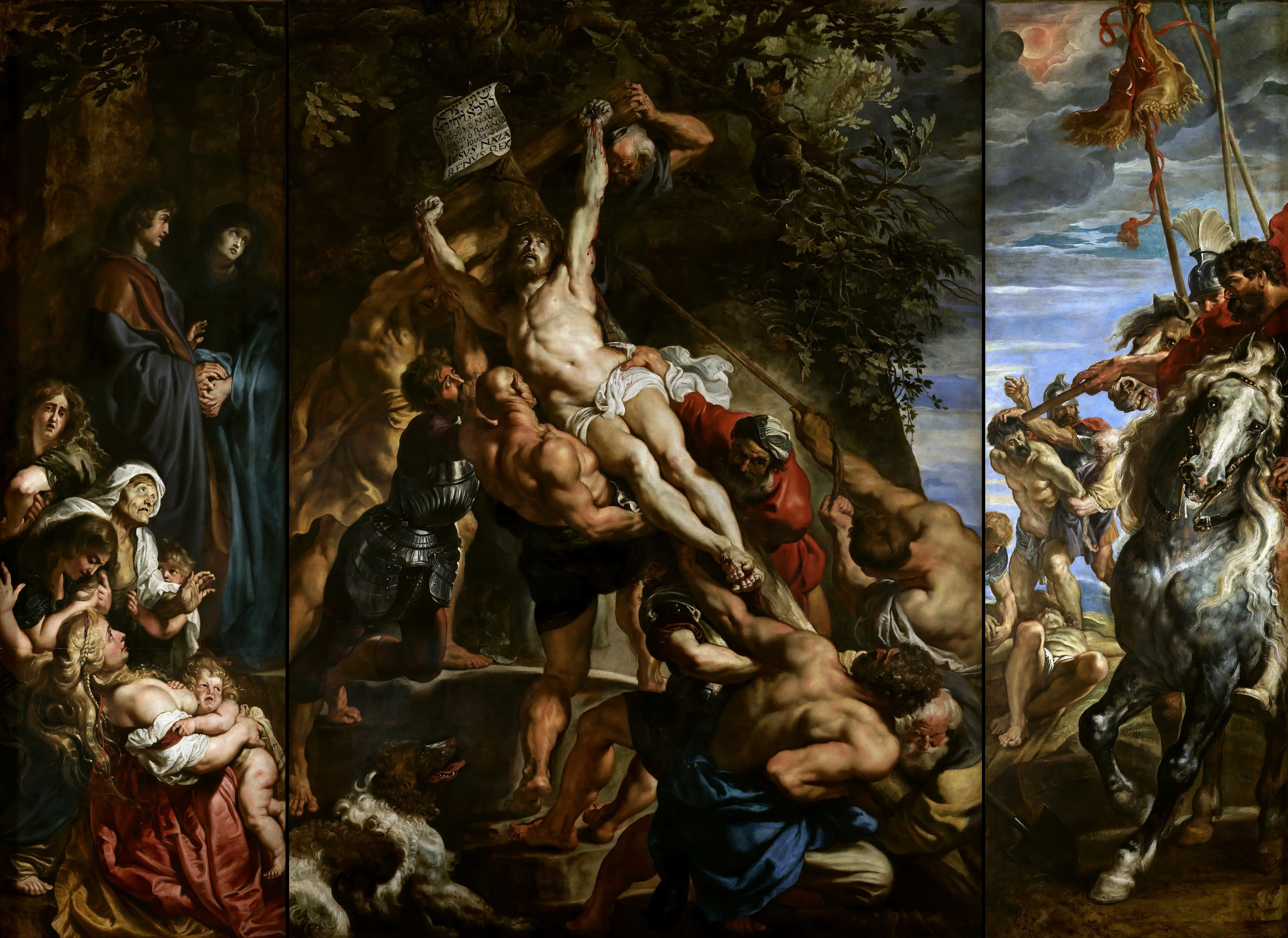
Rubens, 1610

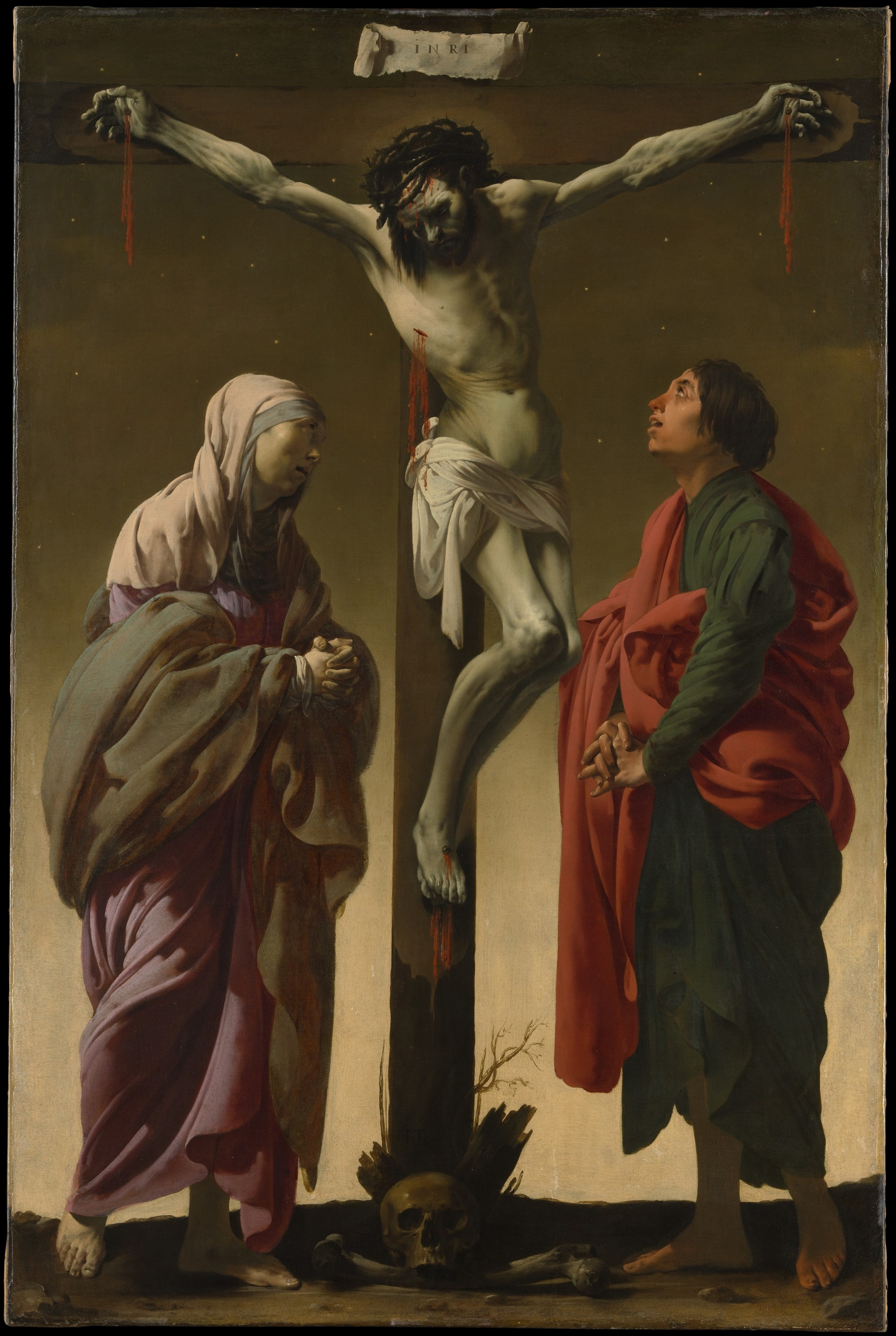
Brugghen, 1625

Ribera, 1643

Champaigne, 1655

== Enlightenment and romantic era ==
James Mynde's illustrations in Astronomy Explained

In the 18th century, the Englightenment spread the knowledge and interest of astronomy to a larger European public. Detailed astronomical illustrations of solar eclipses were produced for Johann Gabriel Doppelmayr's 1742 Atlas Coelestis and in James Ferguson's 1757 Astronomy Explained, illustrated by James Mynde. At this time, eclipses also began appearing in comedic and political cartoons. A French almanac from 1706 visually connected that year's eclipse with Louis XIV's military defeat.

In the 1840s and 1850s, eclipses were painted in a picturesque manner under romanticism in an attempt to depict the atmospheric impact of the subject. Ippolito Caffi's painted Sun Eclipse at the Fondamente Nove following the 1842 solar eclipse above Venice. The work shows a snapshot a minute before totality, in which the eclipsed sun brightly illuminates a third of the sky while leaving the other two-thirds dimmed. The effect is entirely inaccurate, but is a dramatic interpretation of the dynamic changes in light. In another romantic painting, Ivan Aivazovsky rendered the 1851 solar eclipse as it appeared over Feodosia as part of a half-night landscape. Bonart described the result as a "scene of enormous poetic power."

Artist Jean-Jacques Grandville depicted an eclipse as a surreal kiss between the Sun and Moon, voyeuristically intruded upon by modern observational devices, in his 1844 Un Autre Monde. Honoré Daumier published a cartoon in Le Charivari in 1847 (following an annular eclipse) lambasting notaries public with a pun on "eclipse."

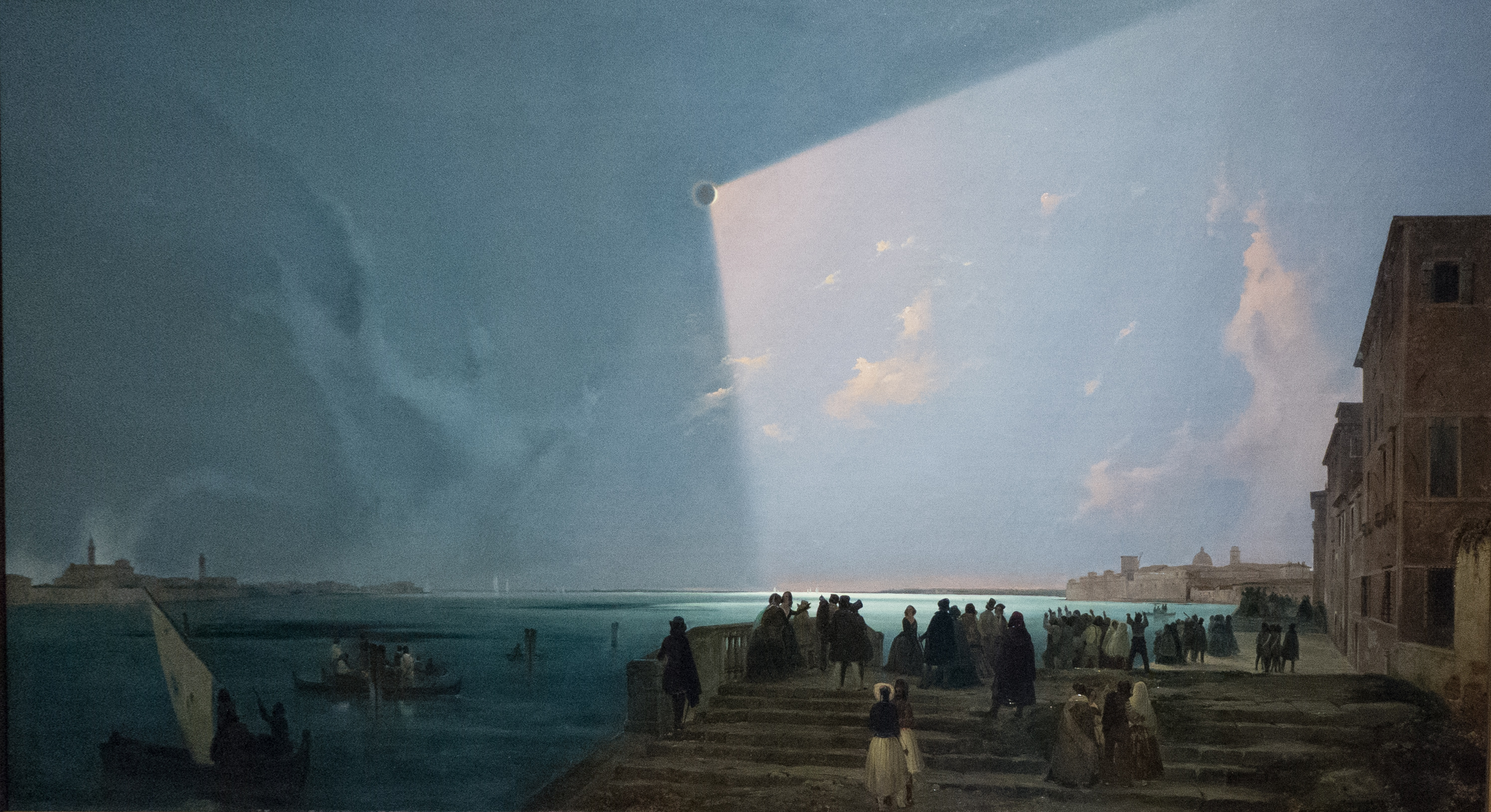
Ippolito Caffi's 1842 painting Sun Eclipse at the Fondamente Nove

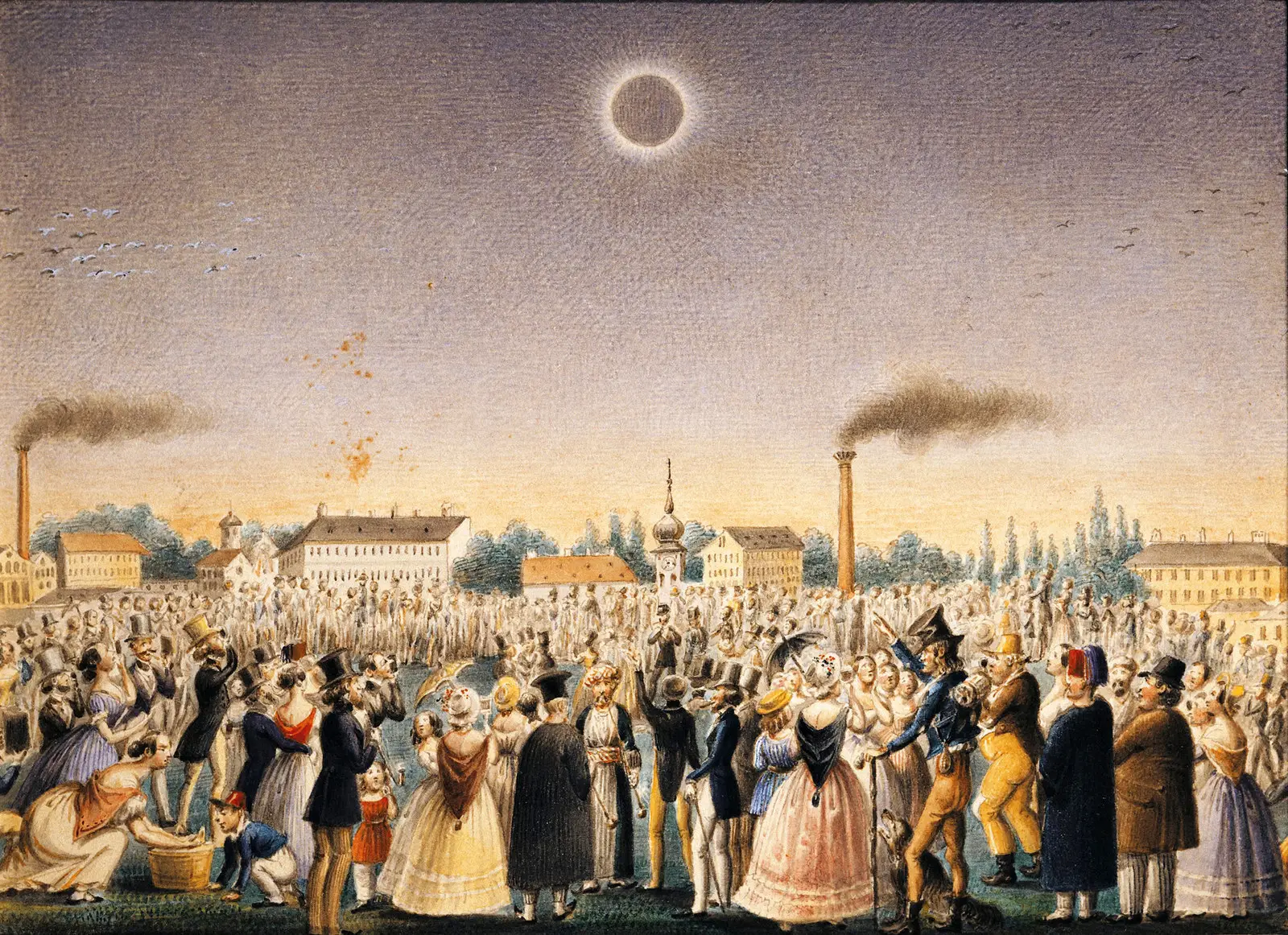
Johann Christian Schoeller's depiction of the 1842 eclipse over Vienna

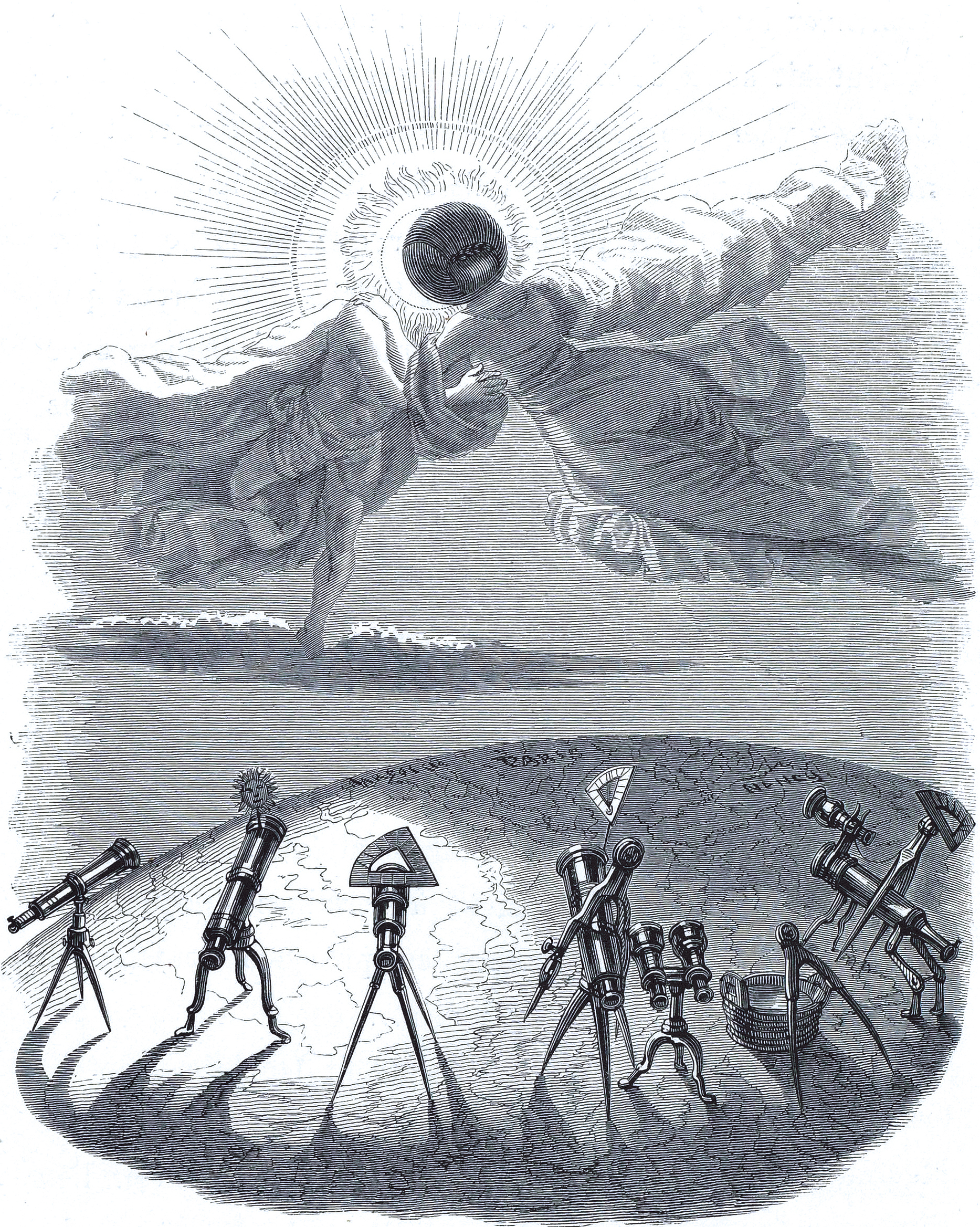
Jean-Jacques Grandville's surreal 1844 engraving

Ivan Aivazovsky's 1951 painting Solar Eclipse at Feodosia

== Modern depictions ==
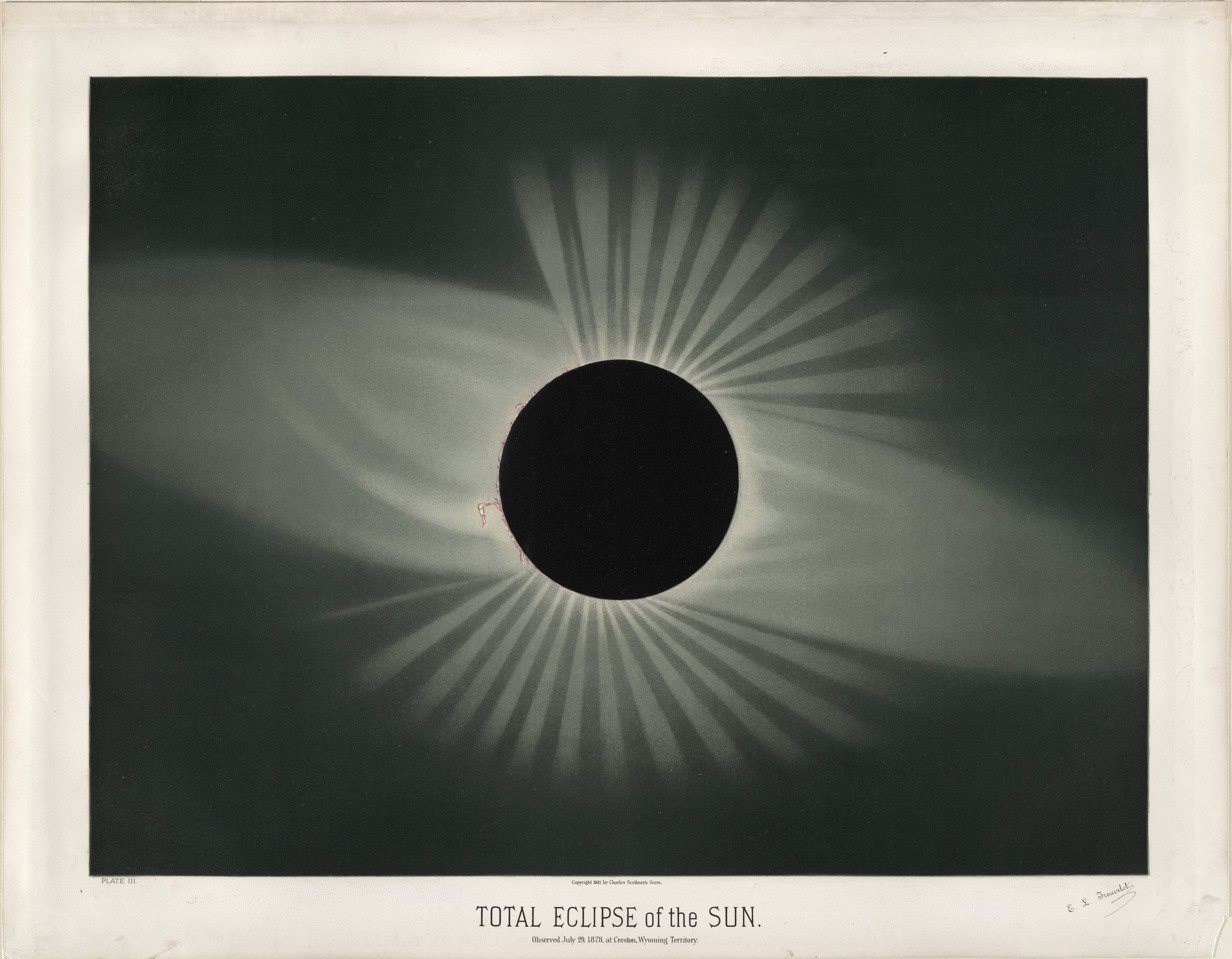
Étienne Léopold Trouvelot's chromolithograph of the 1878 solar eclipse

Artist and astronomer Étienne Léopold Trouvelot traveled to the Wyoming Territory to produce chromolithographs of the 1878 solar eclipse. The highly detailed prints Trouvelot created with this process presents the "finger-like protuberance" of the corona against an greenish backdrop. While not a technically correct rendering, the image was impactful and one of the iconic images of space in its period.

Eclipses appeared in several expressionist paintings. In a crucifixion scene painted by Egon Schiele in 1907, the eclipsed sun reflects Jesus Christ's halo. George Grosz included a total eclipse in a 1926 satire of the Weimar Republic, in which the moon is inscribed with a massive dollar sign. Cubist artist Diego Rivera uses a total eclipse as the eye of his friend in a 1915 portrait. Eclipses are also implied by Wassily Kandinsky's 1926 Sketch for Several Circles.

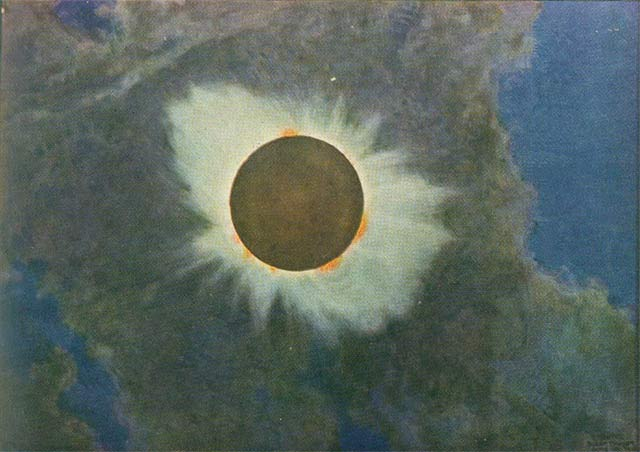
Howard Russell Butler's first painting of a solar eclipse, 1918

American artist Howard Russell Butler joined an expedition by the U.S. Naval Observatory in order to paint the 1918 total solar eclipse above Oregon. Applying his experience in rendering the aurora borealis off the coast of Maine earlier in his career, Butler rapidly sketched and took notes in shorthand for color references within the 2 minute totality of the eclipse, as a Navy officer stood by with a stopwatch. In a lecture following the eclipse, Butler stated that "I generally asked for 10 sittings of 2 hours each. But all the time they would allow me on this occasion was 112 1/10 sec. As it turned out I got a trifle more, for their calculations were short by 3/10 of a second." Butler joined three more solar eclipse expeditions and painted the 1923 solar eclipse above California with a bright Baily's bead. Butler's paintings were used as a scholastic tool and Butler would continue to paint astronomical scenes. Butler notedly applied his knowledge of the physics of light to achieved realistic modelling. He installed a triptych of his 1918, 1923, and 1925 eclipse paintings in the American Museum of Natural History. A comparison between Butler's paintings and photographs revealed both optical illusions and visual artifacts.

Total solar eclipses have been subject of celebrated pieces of abstract art in the late 20th century. Inspired by the 1970 solar eclipse, Alma Thomas painted The Eclipse as the final piece of her "Space" series. In this work, she abstracted the sun's corona with mosaic-like bricks. The subject is off-center, suggesting movement. Roy Lichtenstein painted an eclipse twice under the title Eclipse of the Sun, depicting the sudden movement of totality through an abstract layering of circles and curves typical of his pop-art style. Sculptor El Anatsui produced a copper and aluminium tapestry in 2014 titled Solar Eclipse, which abstracts the subject even further.

Solar eclipses have been rendered vividly in graphic arts, such as in a promotional poster designed to entice people to travel to Liverpool for the 1927 eclipse. For the 2017 total solar eclipse, NASA invited artist Tyler Nordgren to design themed posters depicting the eclipse within the context of the environments in which people live in the United States. In celebrating what NASA called "The Heliophysics Big Year", NASA repeated this for the 2024 solar eclipse. Nordgren was tasked to combine scientific interest and eye-catching design elements in an effort to educate and foster astrotourism to remote locations. In total, Nordgren produced around 85 pieces of nostalgic poster art to promote public eclipse observation.

London, Midland and Scottish Railway, 1927

Nordgren, 2012

Nordgren, 2023

Nordgren, 2012

=== Photography ===
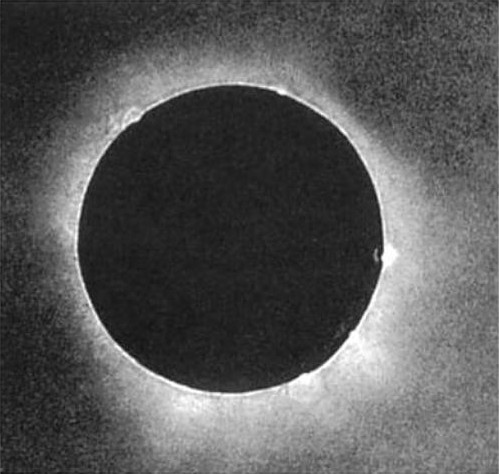
Berkowski's photograph of the 1851 solar eclipse

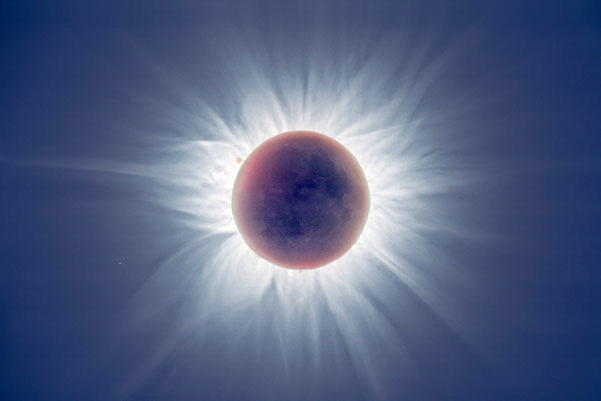
Composite 2001 eclipse photograph by Fred Espenak

The first successful photograph taken of a solar eclipse was that of the July 28, 1851 eclipse, taken by Julius Berkowski. Commissioned by the Royal Prussian Observatory at Königsberg, Berkowski used the "state of the art" daguerreotype process to capture the Sun's corona in contrast with the darkness of the Moon. Other photographers attempted to picture solar eclipses before, but failed due to the long exposure requirements of 19th-century photography. The first photographic record of Baily's Beads was taken during the 1869 solar eclipse by the Albert J. Myer expedition. They were again photographed, accidentally, during the 1889 solar eclipse by Edward Emerson Barnard at the Lick Observatory.

The introduction of devices such as the camera, the spectroscope, the polariscope, and the bolometer revolutionized scientific interest in eclipses. Since the late 18th century, governments and scientific institutions launch specialized scientific expeditions to all accessible total solar eclipses. Such missions were strictly focused on the accurate scientific documentation of all aspects of event, and as such Samuel Langley wrote that "the spectacle is one of which, though the man of science may prosaically state the facts, perhaps only the poet could render the impression." Similarly, Charles Piazzi Smyth described the effect eclipses had on the sky and ground as "a potent Siren's song, which no human mind can withstand." Mabel Loomis Todd described photographs as an "unimpeachable record" of eclipses, but during this period, photography of eclipses was still maturing, limited by the brief instances where different lenses, apertures, and telescopes could be tested. Preparing multiple photographic plates was a time-consuming and delicate operation. To solve this, David Peck Todd developed an automated system that was able to expose several hundred plates during the 3-minute totality of the 1889 solar eclipse.

Modern eclipse photography is highly advanced, with some specialized cameras capable of capturing the solar corona in a single exposure. Computationally combining dozens of photographs taken at different exposure levels allows artists to increase the contrast of the picture, revealing the coronal structure is exquisite detail.

Astrophycist Fred Espenak became known as "Mr. Eclipse" in part for his eclipse photography. He experienced 31 totalities starting in 1970 and was well-known for carrying a large number of cameras on each expedition. The US government and Mongolian government released postage stamps with his photographs and the Royal Photographic Society awarded him for "Scientific Imaging". Composer Wendy Carlos also build a reputation as a foremost solar eclipse photographer and composite creator.

=== In film ===
Early in the history of cinema in 1907, Georges Méliès represented a solar eclipse as a comedic courtship between the sun and moon in L'éclipse du soleil en pleine lune. As the shooting schedule of the 1961 film Barabbas coincided with the 1961 total solar eclipse, producer Dino de Laurentiis took advantage of this for its depiction of the crucifixion of Jesus. Barabbas is unique for being the only feature film to incorporate a real solar eclipse rather than stock footage or special effects. As such, the movie was billed promotionally as the "film that stopped the sun."

Eclipses are employed in film as a dramatic climax. In 1949's A Connecticut Yankee in King Arthur's Court, a predicted eclipse is used as an awesome resolution to the final act. Eclipses have since also played large roles in the climactic scenes of Dragonslayer (1981), Ladyhawke (1985), Dolores Claiborne (1995), and Apocalypto (2006). They are also used as a visual indicator that natural rules are temporarily lifted. In Little Shop of Horrors (1986) and Pitch Black (2000), a solar eclipse serves as the inciting incident, announcing the arrival of alien evil. The 1999 film Judy Berlin actively seeks to capture the "eerie" or "wrong" mood of the sun disappearing in the middle of the day, which allows its characters to reevaluate the world in a different light.

Video in the Information Age allows for novel art experience with solar eclipses. Skateboarder Danny León recorded a video of him performing a mid-air jump synchronized with the 2026 eclipse in the background. Journalist Kyle Orland experienced the 2017 solar eclipse through virtual reality, "jumping" along the path of totality through CNN's 360-degree camera coverage. While the image quality of the stream was low, Orland described it as an example of the power of VR technology.

Méliès' 1907 comedic portrayal of a solar eclipse

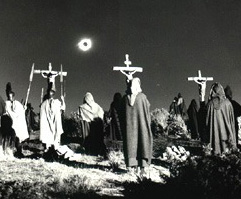
The crucifixion scene in Barabbas was filmed during the solar eclipse of 1961

== Interpretation and impact ==
Ian Blatchford of the Science Museum in London noted that he was struck by artists’ ability to capture the ethereal nature of eclipses in ways that photographs cannot and that throughout history, artistic interpretations of eclipses have been "of real utility to the scientific process." Blatchford stated that even in the age of photography, "the artist remains the most accurate witness of an eclipse, whose individual optical effects may appear and vanish in an eye-blink."

Howard Russell Butler's triptych of solar eclipses (1918 to 1925), "the first works by an artist to depict the solar corona accurately"

== See also ==
- Eclipses in mythology and culture
- Solar eclipses in fiction
- Crucifixion in the arts
