= Eclipses in mythology and culture =

Overview of beliefs regarding eclipses

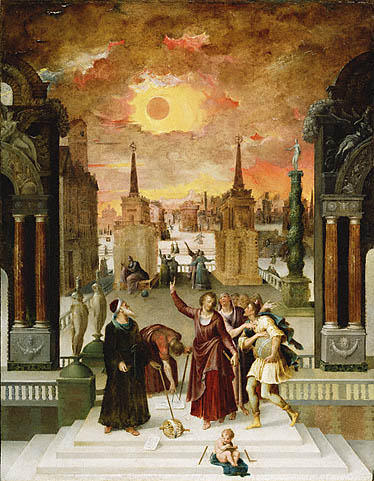
Astronomers Studying an Eclipse, Antoine Caron, 1571

Eclipses of the Sun and of the Moon have been described by nearly every culture. In cultures without an astronomical explanation, eclipses were often attributed to supernatural causes or regarded as bad omens.

== Religious and cultural practices ==
While solar and lunar eclipses are today understood astronomically as one celestial body shadowing another, their appearance from Earth does not intuitively belie a similar cause for each. Mark Littmann, Fred Espenak, and Ken Willcox classified solar eclipse mythologies into four distinct genres:

- A celestial being (usually a monster) attempts to destroy the Sun.
- The Sun fights with its lover, the Moon.
- The Sun and Moon make love and discreetly hide themselves in darkness.
- The Sun god grows angry, sad, sick, or neglectful.

=== Abrahamic religions ===
==== Judaism ====
In the Talmud, solar eclipses are described as ill omens and several events in the Hebrew Bible are said to have occurred during eclipses. Judaism at large has been accepting of the modern astronomical explanation of eclipses and today, many rabbis consider eclipses to be reminders of divinity and a time for prayer and introspection.

==== Christianity ====
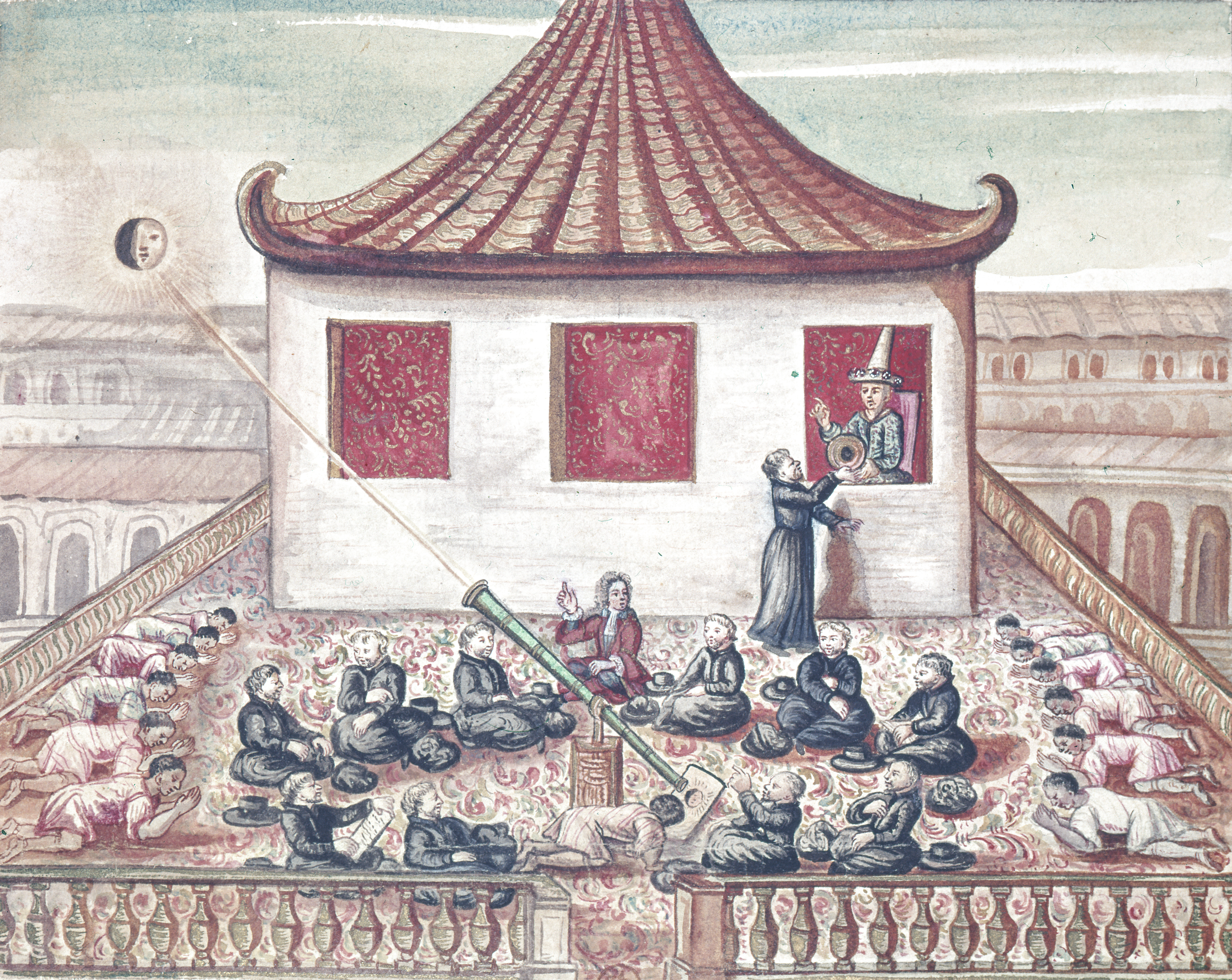
French Jesuits observing an eclipse with King Narai and his court in April 1688, shortly before the Siamese revolution

The periodicity of lunar eclipses was deduced by Neo-Babylonian astronomers in the sixth century BCE, and the periodicity of solar eclipses was deduced in first century BCE by Greek astronomers, who developed the Antikythera mechanism and had understood the Sun, Moon, and Earth to be spherical celestial bodies since Aristotle. The astronomical understanding of eclipses was thus well understood in the Ancient Near East, in which Christianity developed. The New Testament describes the sky as darkening for hours during the crucifixion of Jesus. As the event's lengthy duration and occurrence on the day of a full moon made it clear to contemporary believers that it could not be an eclipse, early Christians interpreted this as an omen and sign of Jesus's divinity. In 12th-century Christian Europe, eclipses were thus connected to earthly rule, where the deaths of Charlemagne and Henry I were preceded by solar and lunar eclipses. Saints were often also connected with eclipses, with a solar eclipse at their death a sign of their holiness. Christian eschatology makes mention of eclipse-like phenomena, where Revelation 6:12 describes how "the sun became black as sackcloth, the full moon became like blood." A minority of modern Christians believe eclipses to portend the Second Coming.

==== Islam ====
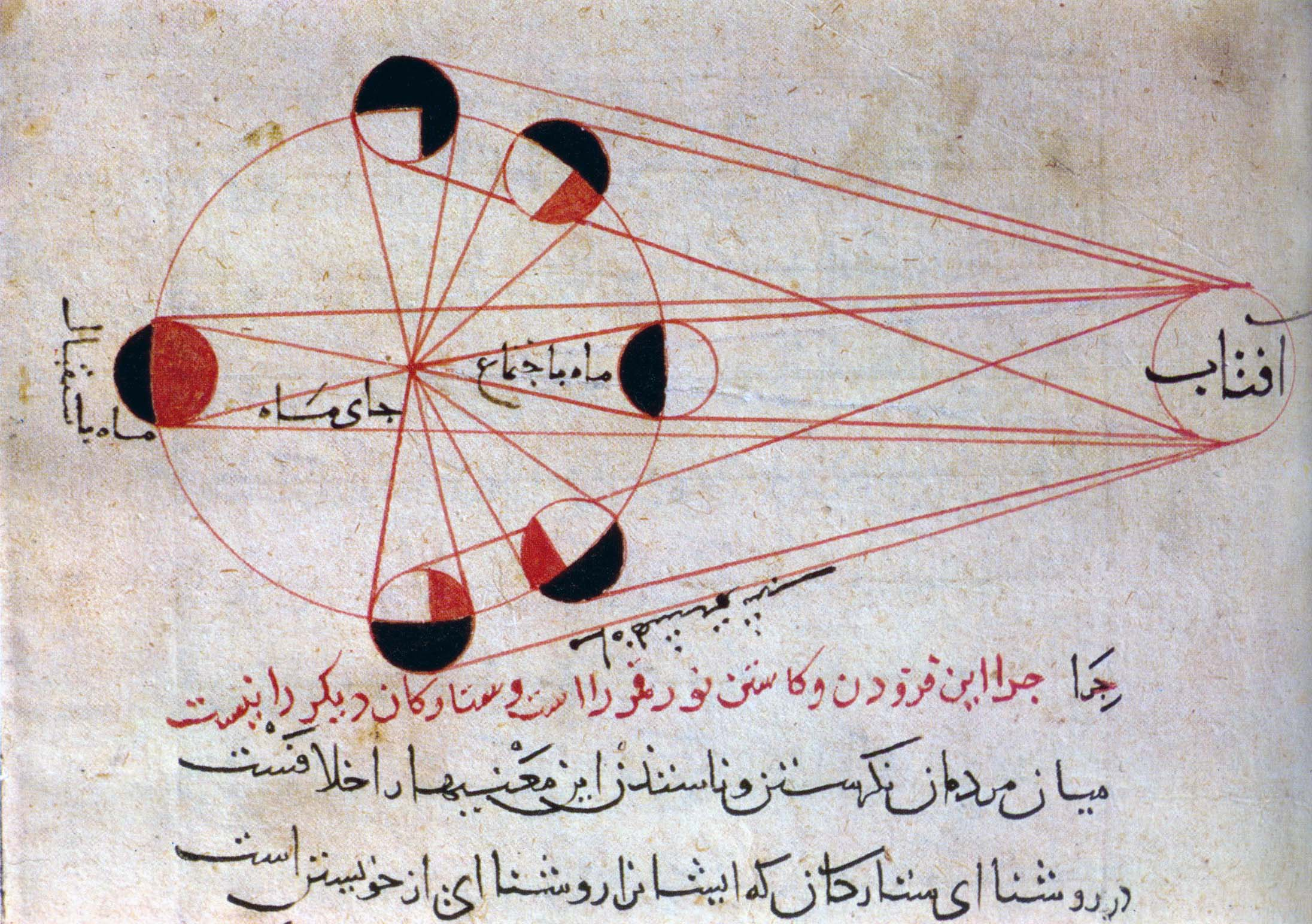
An illustration from al-Biruni's astronomical works that explains the different phases of the moon, with respect to the position of the Sun.

Astronomy in the medieval Islamic world was well-developed, and contributions included Al-Ḥajjāj ibn Yūsuf ibn Maṭar's translation of Ptolemy's Almagest, in which he corrected Ptolemy's method for predicting eclipses. Theologically, the Quran explicitly rejects notions of the Sun and Moon's divinity:

Do not prostrate to the sun or the moon, but prostrate to Allah, Who created them ˹all˺

— Surah Fussilat 41:37

In one hadith, Muhammad objects to followers' treatment of an eclipse as an omen and states that eclipses have no bearing on earthly life and death:

We were with Allah's Messenger (ﷺ) when the sun eclipsed. Allah's Messenger (ﷺ) stood up dragging his cloak till he entered the Mosque. He led us in a two-rak`at prayer till the sun (eclipse) had cleared. Then the Prophet (p.b.u.h) said, "The sun and the moon do not eclipse because of someone's death. So whenever you see these eclipses pray and invoke (Allah) till the eclipse is over."

— Sahih al-Bukhari 1040

On the basis of this accounts in which Muhammad's actions instructed his followers to pray during eclipses as a reminder of God's power, many Muslims today conduct special optional but encouraged communal "eclipse prayers" (in Arabic: صَلَاةُ الكُسُوف, romanized: ṣalāt al-kusūf). With modern eclipse prediction techniques, congregations today announce eclipse prayers in advance as Islam places a great theological weight on communal prayer.

=== Classical Greco-Roman mythology ===
Plutarch associated the birth of Romulus, the foundation of Rome, and his death with three solar eclipses. Scholars have attempted to substantiate these mythological claims through modern astronomical computation, and have not been able to find eclipses on the dates traditionally given for these events. Plutarch's eclipse associations are therefore generally treated by modern scholars as part of the mythic elaboration of Rome's foundation story rather than as historically reliable astronomical records.

=== Hindu mythology ===
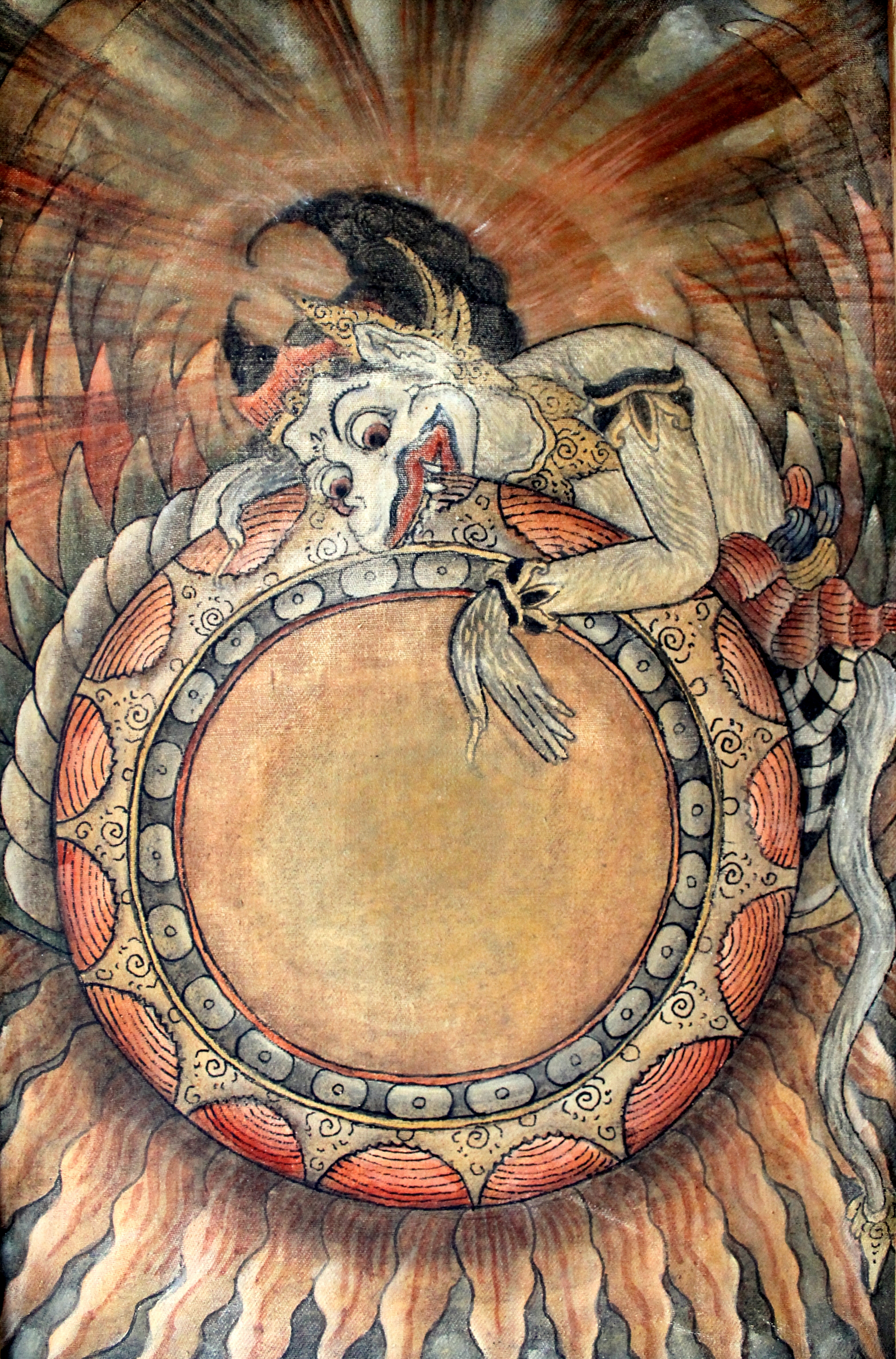
Rahu swallows the Sun, referred to as Rahukalam

According to Hindu mythology, solar and lunar eclipses, known in Sanskrit as grahana occur when the celestial gods Rahu and Ketu swallow the Sun and Moon, respectively.

Hindus generally believe that a grahana is a bad omen, and is considered the best time to chant mantras that ward against evil. Fasting is practiced for up to six hours before an eclipse. Food is often prepared only after the passing of the eclipse, and conventions regarding consuming meals at given hours in the context of the event are prescribed in the Kurma Purana. During an eclipse, Hindus are considered unclean. They bathe and offer prayers to ancestors. Pilgrimage sites situated adjacent to a river throng with devotees during the onset of a grahana in some regions. Pregnant women are considered to be especially at risk to the effects of an eclipse and are expected to adhere more strictly to rituals to prevent birth deformities in their children. It is regarded to be a bad omen to be born during an eclipse, and Brahmins are often called upon to ritually bless such babies.

=== Native American traditions ===
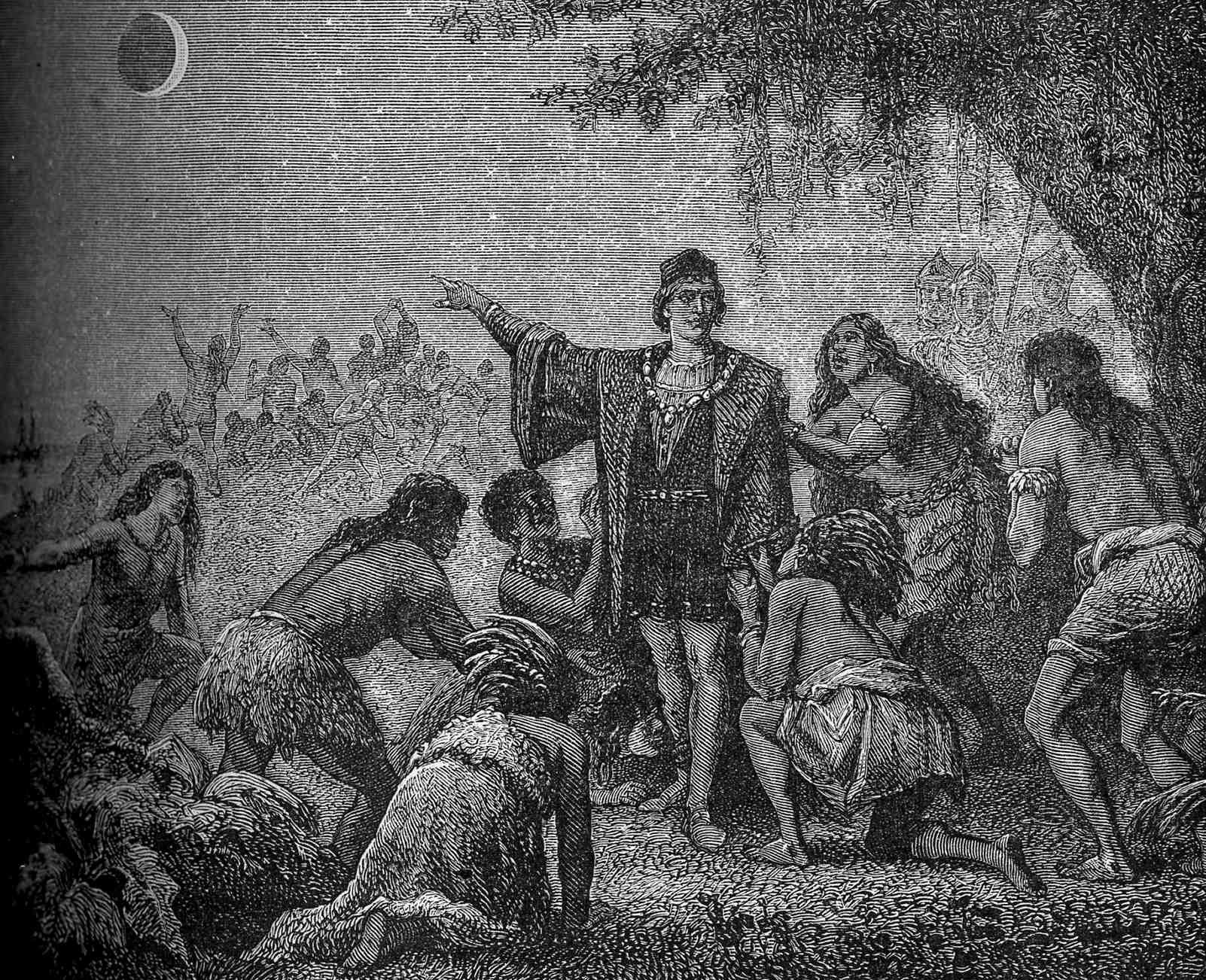
Drawing of Columbus' prediction of the March 1504 lunar eclipse to the native Jamaicans

The Indigenous peoples of the Americas have very diverse cultural practices and beliefs about eclipses.

==== Maya ====
Since the sixteenth century, Western scholars have been interested in "eclipse glyphs" recorded by the Maya civilisation in the Dresden Codex, thought by historians to be predictions of solar and lunar eclipses. As there is no evidence for Maya understanding of heliocentrism or celestial orbits, such eclipse predictions were likely made entirely from observed periodicity. However, some scholars argue that the glyphs in the Mayan codices refer to skies darkened from heavy rainfall, and not to eclipses.

==== Aztec ====
In Aztec mythology, solar eclipses occurred when the jaguar god Tepēyōllōtl consumed the sun and threatened to swallow it completely, according to Eduard Seler's analysis of the Codex Vaticanus B. A 16th century passage from the Florentine Codex gives an account of a solar eclipse:

Then there were a tumult and disorder. All were disquieted, unnerved, frightened. There was weeping. The common folk raised a cry, lifting their voices, making a great din, calling out, shrieking. There was shouting everywhere. People of light complexion were slain [as sacrifices]; captives were killed. All offered their blood; they drew straws through the lobes of their ears, which had been pierced. And in all the temples there was the singing of fitting chants; there was an uproar; there were war cries. It was thus said: "If the eclipse of the sun is complete, it will be dark forever! The demons of darkness will come down; they will eat men!"

— de Sahagún (1950), p. 2

There was no record of lunar eclipses in Aztec mythology or recordkeeping, as noted by an observer who wrote in the Codex Telleriano-Remensis about a lunar eclipse in 1510. The Aztec records of solar eclipses, when present, are tied directly to historic events; it is likely that they chose to record such events only when they coincided with social or political events.

==== Navajo ====
Navajo people consider the time during an eclipse to be a sacred moment of renewal, and refrain from all activities, including eating and drinking. During an eclipse, the Sun or Moon is believed to be dying and reborn. Members of the nation should be silent in prayer, and it is considered forbidden to look anywhere except down at the ground. Before modern eclipse prediction methods, the Navajo people believed they could predict oncoming eclipses through their traditional songs. During the solar eclipse of October 14, 2023, the offices of the Navajo Nation, including its parks, were closed out of reverence for the eclipse.

==== Hopi ====
The Hopi people, whose reservation is an enclave of the Navajo Nation, consider eclipses to be a time of ceremony.

=== New religious movements ===
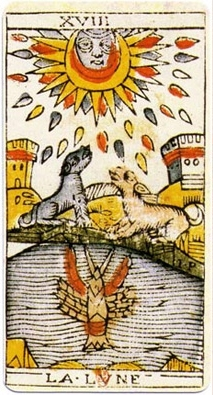
An original card from the tarot deck of Jean Dodal of Lyon, a classic "Tarot of Marseilles" deck, 1701–1715

Some New Age and Wicca practitioners view solar and lunar eclipses as important spiritual events. As decentralised religious practices, there are no set prescribed rituals, and adherents are free to explore their own exercises, which can include crystal charging imbuing water with energy, and tarot card reading. For some Wicca practitioners, the spiritual nature of the solar eclipse of August 21, 2017 was an opportunity for political activism, casting spells against the administration of Donald Trump.

=== Norse mythology ===
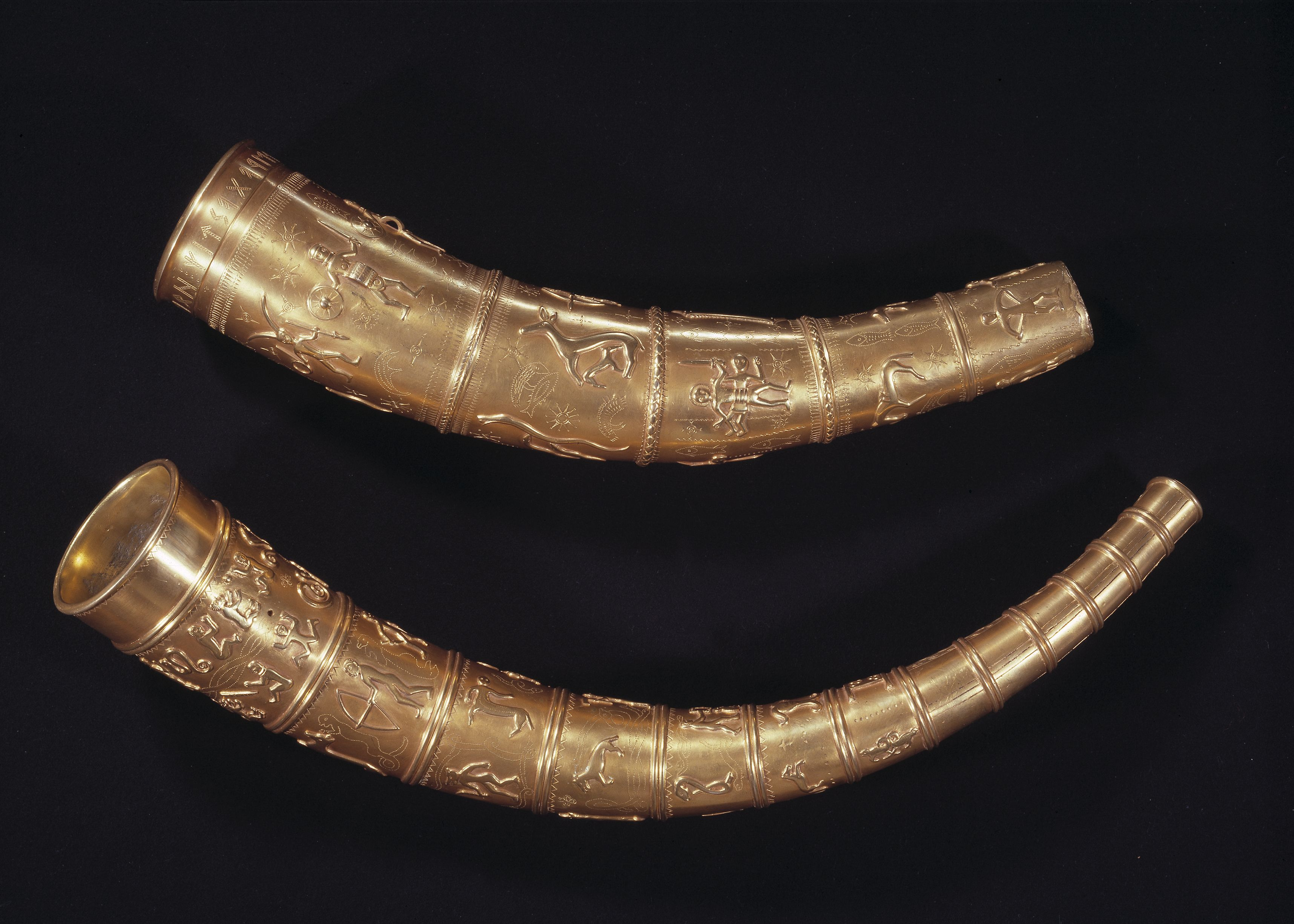
The replicas of the Golden Horns of Gallehus exhibited at the National Museum of Denmark

According to Norse mythology, a wolf named Fenrir lives in constant pursuit of the Sun. When Fenrir consumes the Sun, the end times events of Ragnarök will ensue. Historians consider it likely that the Golden Horns of Gallehus artifacts, which contain eschatological iconography, were made in response a lunar eclipse of November 4, 412 and a solar eclipse of April 16, 413.

Other Norse tribes believe that there are two wolves named Sköll and Hati that are in pursuit of the Sun and the Moon, known by the names of Sól and Mani, and that an eclipse occurs when one of the wolves successfully eats either the Sun or the Moon.

=== West African mythology ===
The Fon people believe that the creator god Mawu-Lisa divided into a Sun god Lisa and Moon god Mawu. Eclipses are seen as the two gods engaging in intercourse. The Jukun people explained eclipses as the Sun catching the Moon, and would beat drums to make the Sun release its hold on the Moon.

== Superstitions ==
=== Pregnancy ===
In some cultures, eclipses are thought to harm pregnant women and their children. They are said to cause birthmarks or birth defects. These beliefs are most commonly found in Hispanic countries particularly Mexico, and India, most prevalent in rural areas.

In Mexican superstitions, pregnant women wear a pin on their shirts or carry something metal near their wombs, and to wear red underwear or ribbons.

== Visual art ==
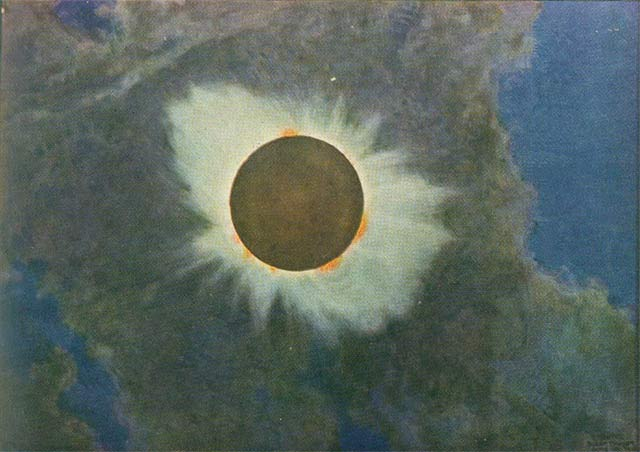
Howard Russell Butler's first painting of a solar eclipse, 1918

Solar eclipses have been subject to art for all of human history. Early rock-carvings of eclipses are difficult to confirm and interpret. Solar eclipses became a common theme in images of the crucifixion of Jesus during the Catholic Revival in the 17th century, as an interpretation of the crucifixion darkness described in the synoptic Gospels. Astronomical illustrations of solar eclipses became increasingly common during the Age of Enlightenment and they began to become subject to political and comedic cartoons. Romantic paintings of solar eclipses maximized the atmospheric impact of the subject. In the 20th century, artistic representations of eclipses became increasingly abstract and stylized.

Scientific interest in eclipses was revolutionized with photographic technologies developed in the 19th century. Taking photographs of totality was a time-consuming and error-prone activity which slowly matured. In the 1920s and 1930s, artist Howard Russell Butler produced a set of richly detailed paintings of solar eclipses which rivaled photographic documentation at the time. Modern eclipse photography is highly advanced, capturing more detail than is visible by the naked eye.

== Literature ==
The earliest known mention of a solar eclipse in storytelling is a chapter of the Odyssey in which Theoclymenus predicts the deaths of Penelope's suitors during an eclipse

The eclipse is mentioned poetically in Shakespeare's King Lear and in John Milton's Paradise Lost as dark political omens. Similarly, diarist John Evelyn wrote in 1652 that a solar eclipse "had so exceedingly alarm’d the whole Nation, so as hardly any would worke, none stir out of their houses; so ridiculously were they abused by knavish and ignorant star-gazers." In less gloomful contrast, Emily Dickinson wrote in a short untitled poem "Eclipse — was all we could see at the Window; And Awe — was all we could feel." Virginia Woolf described the initial darkness of the 1927 solar eclipse dourly, "Suddenly the light went out. We had fallen. It was extinct. The earth was dead." Describing the sensation of the eclipse ending, she wrote "At first with a miraculous glittering and ethereality, later normally almost, but with a great sense of relief. It was like a recovery."

== Modern secular practices ==
=== Eclipse chasing ===
A dedicated group of eclipse chasers have pursued the observation of solar eclipses when they occur around Earth. A person who chases eclipses is known as an umbraphile, meaning shadow lover. Umbraphiles travel for eclipses and use various tools to help view the Sun, including solar viewing glasses, also known as eclipse glasses, as well as telescopes.

=== Educational outreach ===
Solar and lunar eclipses are often used by educational institutions as events for public outreach about astronomy. Lunar eclipses, which are visible by about half the planet at once, are relatively small-scale events for individual organisations and simple to plan for. In areas with extreme levels of light pollution, stargazing may be impossible and so educational stargazing is necessarily restricted to lunar eclipses. By studying lunar phases and eclipses, students can learn about the sizes and relative distances between the Sun, Earth, and Moon.

Solar eclipses happen during daylight hours in narrow visibility bands, which allows educational organizations to plan daytime outreach events that will naturally reach large crowds. Astronomy educators often feel an obligation to ensure eclipse viewers use solar viewing glasses and utilise outreach events to distribute glasses and encourage compliance. Where both a total and annular solar eclipse can be seen in relatively quick succession, outreach events can discuss the effect of the elliptical shapes of the Earth's and Moon's orbits on the magnitude of the eclipse. As solar eclipses trace indiscriminately across swaths of continents, rural and impoverished areas in their path can benefit from greater attention paid to educating on astronomy and science in these areas.

Eclipses have also been opportunities for citizen science. As brief but geographically diverse events, it is difficult to organize traditional experiments across the entire viewing area. Crowd-sourced experiments have included a test of radio wave propagation, plant and animal reactions, and air temperature measurements.

=== Civic events ===
Solar eclipses are best visible in a narrow band across the planet, which places a significant logistical burden on organizations and towns in the path of totality. Southern Illinois University Carbondale found itself at the center of the solar eclipse of August 21, 2017, for which the university had to spend three years planning for the anticipated 30,000 additional visitors on what was originally scheduled as new-student move-in day. Traffic congestion before and after a solar eclipse can be severe, with crowds numbering in the hundreds of thousands filling highways and spilling off into secondary roadways.

Eclipses are opportunities for large civic gatherings outside the educational sphere. For the solar eclipse of April 8, 2024, a rural portion of Texas had planned to hold a multi-day music and arts festival. During the solar eclipse of August 21, 2017, U.S. President Donald Trump made an appearance outside the White House visible to onlookers from across the South Lawn to view the eclipse.

== See also ==
- Solar eclipse – Event wherein the Sun is obscured by the Moon
- Lunar eclipse – Natural phenomenon wherein the Earth casts a shadow on the Moon
- List of films featuring eclipses
- Apollo–Soyuz – First international crewed spaceflight mission. During the mission, an Apollo spacecraft eclipsed the Sun to let a Soyuz craft image the Sun's corona.
- Solar eclipses in fiction
- Solar eclipses on the Moon – Lunar phenomenon wherein the Sun is obscured by Earth
- Transit of Venus – Astronomical transit of Venus across the Sun
