= Howard Butler =

Howard Butler may refer to:

- Howard Crosby Butler, American archaeologist
- Howard Russell Butler, American painter
