= Solar eclipse of July 28, 1851 =

First solar eclipse to be accurately photographed

- Total eclipse
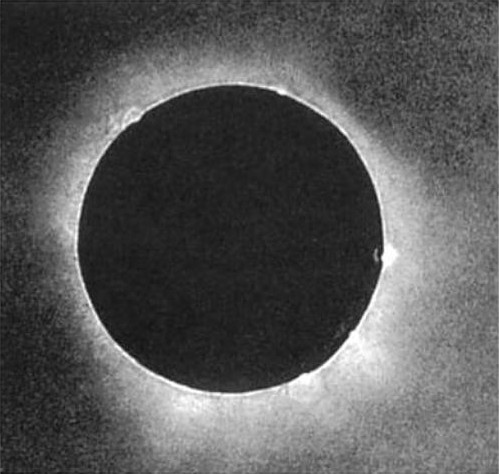
- Berkowski made this first solar eclipse photograph at the Royal Observatory in Königsberg, Prussia (now Kaliningrad, Russia)

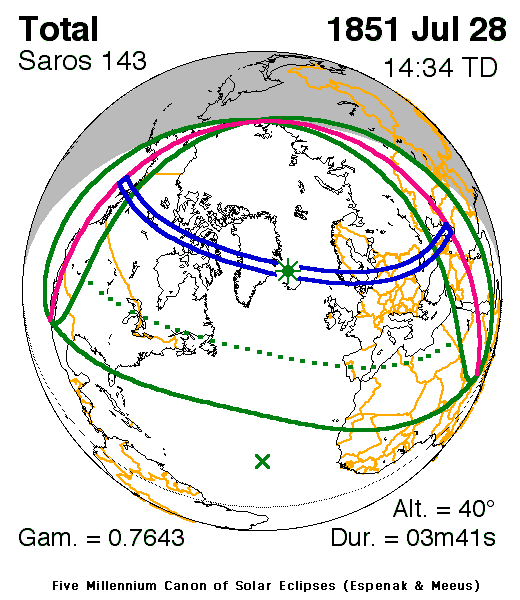
- Map
- Gamma: 0.7644
- Magnitude: 1.0577

Maximum eclipse
- Duration: 221 s (3 min 41 s)
- Coordinates: 68°N 19.6°W
- Max. width of band: 296 km (184 mi)

Times (UTC)
- Greatest eclipse: 14:33:42

References
- Saros: 143 (14 of 72)
- Catalog # (SE5000): 9167

A total solar eclipse occurred at the Moon's ascending node of orbit on Monday, July 28, 1851, with a magnitude of 1.0577. A solar eclipse occurs when the Moon passes between Earth and the Sun, thereby totally or partly obscuring the image of the Sun for a viewer on Earth. A total solar eclipse occurs when the Moon's apparent diameter is larger than the Sun's, blocking all direct sunlight, turning day into darkness. Totality occurs in a narrow path across Earth's surface, with the partial solar eclipse visible over a surrounding region thousands of kilometres wide. Occurring about 1.5 days before perigee (on July 30, 1851, at 2:30 UTC), the Moon's apparent diameter was larger.

The path of totality was visible from parts of modern-day Canada, Greenland, Iceland, Norway, Sweden, Denmark, Poland, Russia, southwestern Lithuania, Belarus, Ukraine, Moldova, Georgia, Armenia, and Azerbaijan. A partial solar eclipse was also visible for parts of North America, Europe, North Africa, Russia, the Middle East, and Central Asia.

This was the earliest scientifically useful photograph of a total solar eclipse, made by Julius Berkowski at the Royal Observatory in Königsberg, Prussia. It was the first occasion that an accurate photographic image of a solar eclipse was recorded.

== Background ==
A solar eclipse occurs when the Moon passes between the Earth and the Sun, casting a shadow on Earth that temporarily obscures part or all of the Sun's disc. Eclipses can occur only when all three bodies are properly aligned. Partial eclipses, in which only a portion of the Sun's surface is obscured, are relatively common due to the width of the Moon's outer shadow, or penumbra, which may be several hundred miles wide. Total eclipses occur when the Moon's inner shadow, or umbra, reaches the surface of the Earth, completely obscuring the Sun over a much narrower portion of the ground. If the Moon is too far away at the time of an eclipse, its umbra may not reach the Earth's surface, and only a partial eclipse will be visible.

Before the advent of modern science, solar eclipses were often viewed with superstitious dread. However, eclipses are also of interest to science due to the various phenomena that can be observed when they occur. The Sun's outer atmosphere, or corona, is normally invisible due to the brightness of the solar disc, but becomes visible from Earth during a total eclipse. Until the twentieth century, solar eclipses provided the only opportunity for scientists to observe and study the Sun's corona. With the development of photography during the first half of the nineteenth century, it became theoretically possible to record a still image of the Sun during a total eclipse. A variety of processes were used for early photographs, of which the most successful was the daguerreotype.

== Observations ==
Photographing a rare event such as a total eclipse posed unique challenges for early photography, including the extreme contrast between the corona and the dark shadow of the Moon, as well as the unusual angle to which photographic equipment had to be oriented. Prior to the eclipse of July 28, 1851, no properly exposed photograph of the solar corona had yet been produced. For this occasion, the Royal Prussian Observatory at Königsberg (now Kaliningrad, Russia) commissioned one of the city's most skilled daguerreotypists, Johann Julius Friedrich Berkowski, to record a still image of the event. The observers attached a small six-centimeter refracting telescope to a 15.8 centimeter Fraunhofer heliometer, and Berkowski made an eighty-four second exposure shortly after the beginning of totality.

Among the other observers were British astronomers Robert Grant and William Swan, and Austrian astronomer Karl Ludwig von Littrow. They deduced that prominences were part of the Sun, because the Moon was seen to cover and uncover them as it moved in front of the Sun.

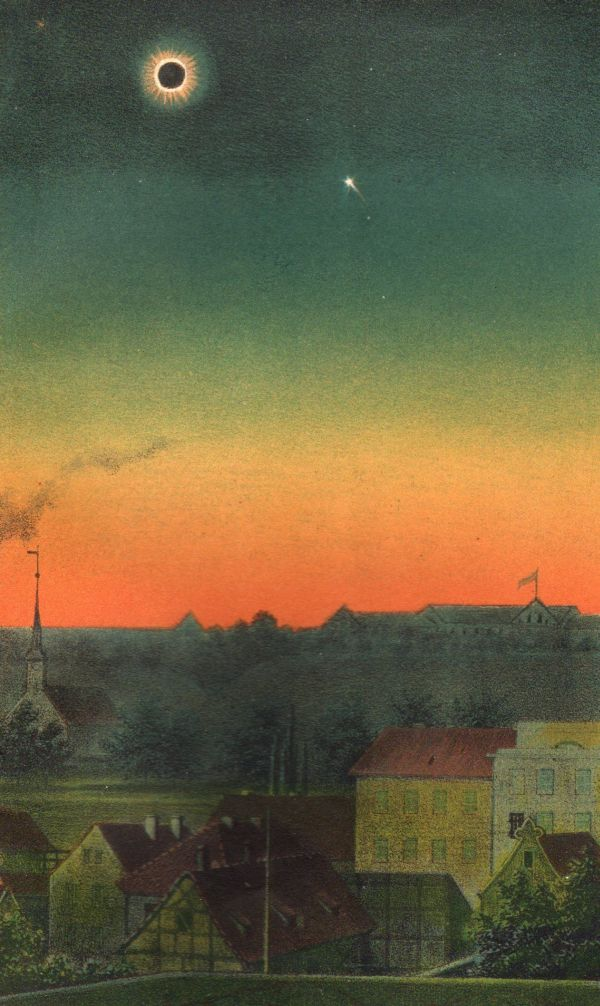
From Gdańsk

Partial from Shelbyville, Kentucky

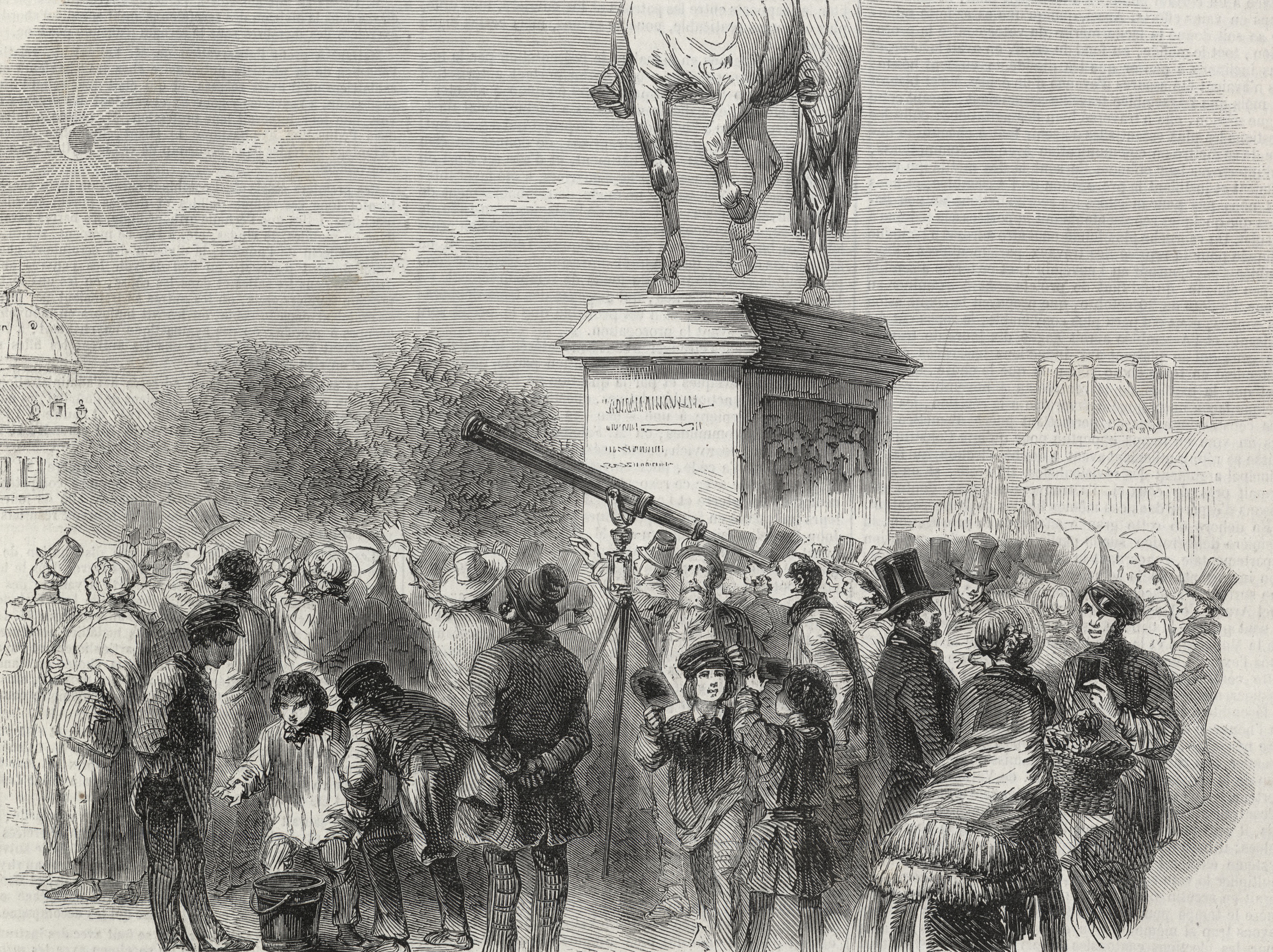
Observers from Paris

== Eclipse details ==
Shown below are two tables displaying details about this particular solar eclipse. The first table outlines times at which the Moon's penumbra or umbra attains the specific parameter, and the second table describes various other parameters pertaining to this eclipse.

July 28, 1851 Solar Eclipse Times
Event	Time (UTC)
First Penumbral External Contact	1851 July 28 at 12:15:06.1 UTC
First Umbral External Contact	1851 July 28 at 13:24:53.6 UTC
First Central Line	1851 July 28 at 13:26:48.7 UTC
First Umbral Internal Contact	1851 July 28 at 13:28:45.8 UTC
Equatorial Conjunction	1851 July 28 at 14:21:59.0 UTC
Greatest Eclipse	1851 July 28 at 14:33:41.9 UTC
Greatest Duration	1851 July 28 at 14:33:48.3 UTC
Ecliptic Conjunction	1851 July 28 at 14:41:27.8 UTC
Last Umbral Internal Contact	1851 July 28 at 15:38:44.7 UTC
Last Central Line	1851 July 28 at 15:40:43.2 UTC
Last Umbral External Contact	1851 July 28 at 15:42:39.8 UTC
Last Penumbral External Contact	1851 July 28 at 16:52:19.9 UTC

July 28, 1851 Solar Eclipse Parameters
Parameter	Value
Eclipse Magnitude	1.05765
Eclipse Obscuration	1.11863
Gamma	0.76436
Sun Right Ascension	08h28m49.7s
Sun Declination	+19°03'55.7"
Sun Semi-Diameter	15'45.2"
Sun Equatorial Horizontal Parallax	08.7"
Moon Right Ascension	08h29m18.2s
Moon Declination	+19°49'34.3"
Moon Semi-Diameter	16'29.2"
Moon Equatorial Horizontal Parallax	1°00'30.3"
ΔT	7.1 s

== Eclipse season ==
This eclipse is part of an eclipse season, a period, roughly every six months, when eclipses occur. Only two (or occasionally three) eclipse seasons occur each year, and each season lasts about 35 days and repeats just short of six months (173 days) later; thus two full eclipse seasons always occur each year. Either two or three eclipses happen each eclipse season. In the sequence below, each eclipse is separated by a fortnight.

Eclipse season of July 1851
July 13 Descending node (full moon)	July 28 Ascending node (new moon)
Partial lunar eclipse Lunar Saros 117	Total solar eclipse Solar Saros 143

== Related eclipses ==
=== Eclipses in 1851 ===
- A partial lunar eclipse on January 17.
- An annular solar eclipse on February 1.
- A partial lunar eclipse on July 13.
- A total solar eclipse on July 28.

=== Metonic ===
- Preceded by: Solar eclipse of October 9, 1847
- Followed by: Solar eclipse of May 16, 1855

=== Tzolkinex ===
- Preceded by: Solar eclipse of June 16, 1844
- Followed by: Solar eclipse of September 7, 1858

=== Half-Saros ===
- Preceded by: Lunar eclipse of July 22, 1842
- Followed by: Lunar eclipse of August 1, 1860

=== Tritos ===
- Preceded by: Solar eclipse of August 27, 1840
- Followed by: Solar eclipse of June 27, 1862

=== Solar Saros 143 ===
- Preceded by: Solar eclipse of July 17, 1833
- Followed by: Solar eclipse of August 7, 1869

=== Inex ===
- Preceded by: Solar eclipse of August 16, 1822
- Followed by: Solar eclipse of July 7, 1880

=== Triad ===
- Preceded by: Solar eclipse of September 25, 1764
- Followed by: Solar eclipse of May 29, 1938

=== Solar eclipses of 1848–1852 ===
This eclipse is a member of a semester series. An eclipse in a semester series of solar eclipses repeats approximately every 177 days and 4 hours (a semester) at alternating nodes of the Moon's orbit.

The partial solar eclipses on April 3, 1848 and September 27, 1848 occur in the previous lunar year eclipse set, and the solar eclipses on June 17, 1852 (partial) and December 11, 1852 (total) occur in the next lunar year eclipse set.

Solar eclipse series sets from 1848 to 1852
Descending node			Ascending node		
Saros	Map	Gamma	Saros	Map	Gamma
108	March 5, 1848 Partial	1.3950	113	August 28, 1848 Partial	−1.5475
118	February 23, 1849 Annular	0.7475	123	August 18, 1849 Total	−0.7343
128	February 12, 1850 Annular	0.0503	133	August 7, 1850 Total	0.0215
138	February 1, 1851 Annular	−0.6413	143	July 28, 1851 Total	0.7644
148	January 21, 1852 Partial	−1.2948			

=== Saros 143 ===
This eclipse is a part of Saros series 143, repeating every 18 years, 11 days, and containing 72 events. The series started with a partial solar eclipse on March 7, 1617. It contains total eclipses from June 24, 1797 through October 24, 1995; hybrid eclipses from November 3, 2013 through December 6, 2067; and annular eclipses from December 16, 2085 through September 16, 2536. The series ends at member 72 as a partial eclipse on April 23, 2897. Its eclipses are tabulated in three columns; every third eclipse in the same column is one exeligmos apart, so they all cast shadows over approximately the same parts of the Earth.

The longest duration of totality was produced by member 16 at 3 minutes, 50 seconds on August 19, 1887, and the longest duration of annularity will be produced by member 51 at 4 minutes, 54 seconds on September 6, 2518. All eclipses in this series occur at the Moon’s ascending node of orbit.

Series members 12–33 occur between 1801 and 2200:
12	13	14
July 6, 1815	July 17, 1833	July 28, 1851
15	16	17
August 7, 1869	August 19, 1887	August 30, 1905
18	19	20
September 10, 1923	September 21, 1941	October 2, 1959
21	22	23
October 12, 1977	October 24, 1995	November 3, 2013
24	25	26
November 14, 2031	November 25, 2049	December 6, 2067
27	28	29
December 16, 2085	December 29, 2103	January 8, 2122
30	31	32
January 20, 2140	January 30, 2158	February 10, 2176
33
February 21, 2194

=== Metonic series ===
The metonic series repeats eclipses every 19 years (6939.69 days), lasting about 5 cycles. Eclipses occur in nearly the same calendar date. In addition, the octon subseries repeats 1/5 of that or every 3.8 years (1387.94 days). All eclipses in this table occur at the Moon's descending node.

24 eclipse events between March 4, 1802 and July 28, 1870
March 4	December 20–21	October 8–9	July 27–28	May 15–16
117	119	121	123	125
March 4, 1802	December 21, 1805	October 9, 1809	July 27, 1813	May 16, 1817
127	129	131	133	135
March 4, 1821	December 20, 1824	October 9, 1828	July 27, 1832	May 15, 1836
137	139	141	143	145
March 4, 1840	December 21, 1843	October 9, 1847	July 28, 1851	May 16, 1855
147	149	151	153	
March 4, 1859	December 21, 1862	October 8, 1866	July 28, 1870	

=== Tritos series ===
This eclipse is a part of a tritos cycle, repeating at alternating nodes every 135 synodic months (≈ 3986.63 days, or 11 years minus 1 month). Their appearance and longitude are irregular due to a lack of synchronization with the anomalistic month (period of perigee), but groupings of 3 tritos cycles (≈ 33 years minus 3 months) come close (≈ 434.044 anomalistic months), so eclipses are similar in these groupings.

Series members between 1801 and 1982
November 29, 1807 (Saros 139)	October 29, 1818 (Saros 140)	September 28, 1829 (Saros 141)	August 27, 1840 (Saros 142)	July 28, 1851 (Saros 143)
June 27, 1862 (Saros 144)	May 26, 1873 (Saros 145)	April 25, 1884 (Saros 146)	March 26, 1895 (Saros 147)	February 23, 1906 (Saros 148)
January 23, 1917 (Saros 149)	December 24, 1927 (Saros 150)	November 21, 1938 (Saros 151)	October 21, 1949 (Saros 152)	September 20, 1960 (Saros 153)
August 20, 1971 (Saros 154)	July 20, 1982 (Saros 155)			

=== Inex series ===
This eclipse is a part of the long period inex cycle, repeating at alternating nodes, every 358 synodic months (≈ 10,571.95 days, or 29 years minus 20 days). Their appearance and longitude are irregular due to a lack of synchronization with the anomalistic month (period of perigee). However, groupings of 3 inex cycles (≈ 87 years minus 2 months) comes close (≈ 1,151.02 anomalistic months), so eclipses are similar in these groupings.

Series members between 1801 and 2200
August 16, 1822 (Saros 142)	July 28, 1851 (Saros 143)	July 7, 1880 (Saros 144)
June 17, 1909 (Saros 145)	May 29, 1938 (Saros 146)	May 9, 1967 (Saros 147)
April 17, 1996 (Saros 148)	March 29, 2025 (Saros 149)	March 9, 2054 (Saros 150)
February 16, 2083 (Saros 151)	January 29, 2112 (Saros 152)	January 8, 2141 (Saros 153)
December 18, 2169 (Saros 154)	November 28, 2198 (Saros 155)	
