= Eclipse photography =

Genre of astrophotography capturing the image of eclipses

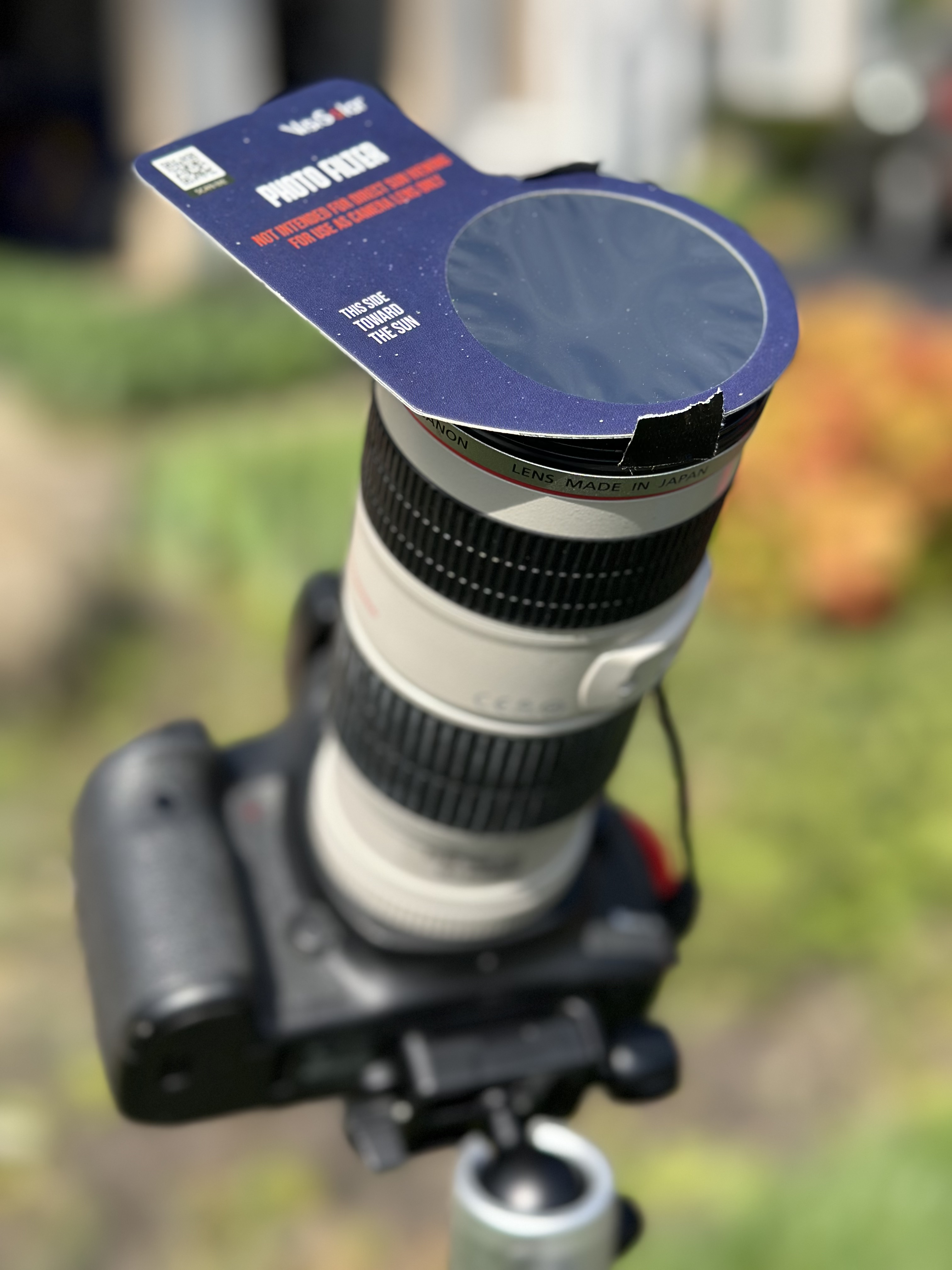
Eclipse photography camera gear using ISO 12312-2 solar filter, April 8, 2024

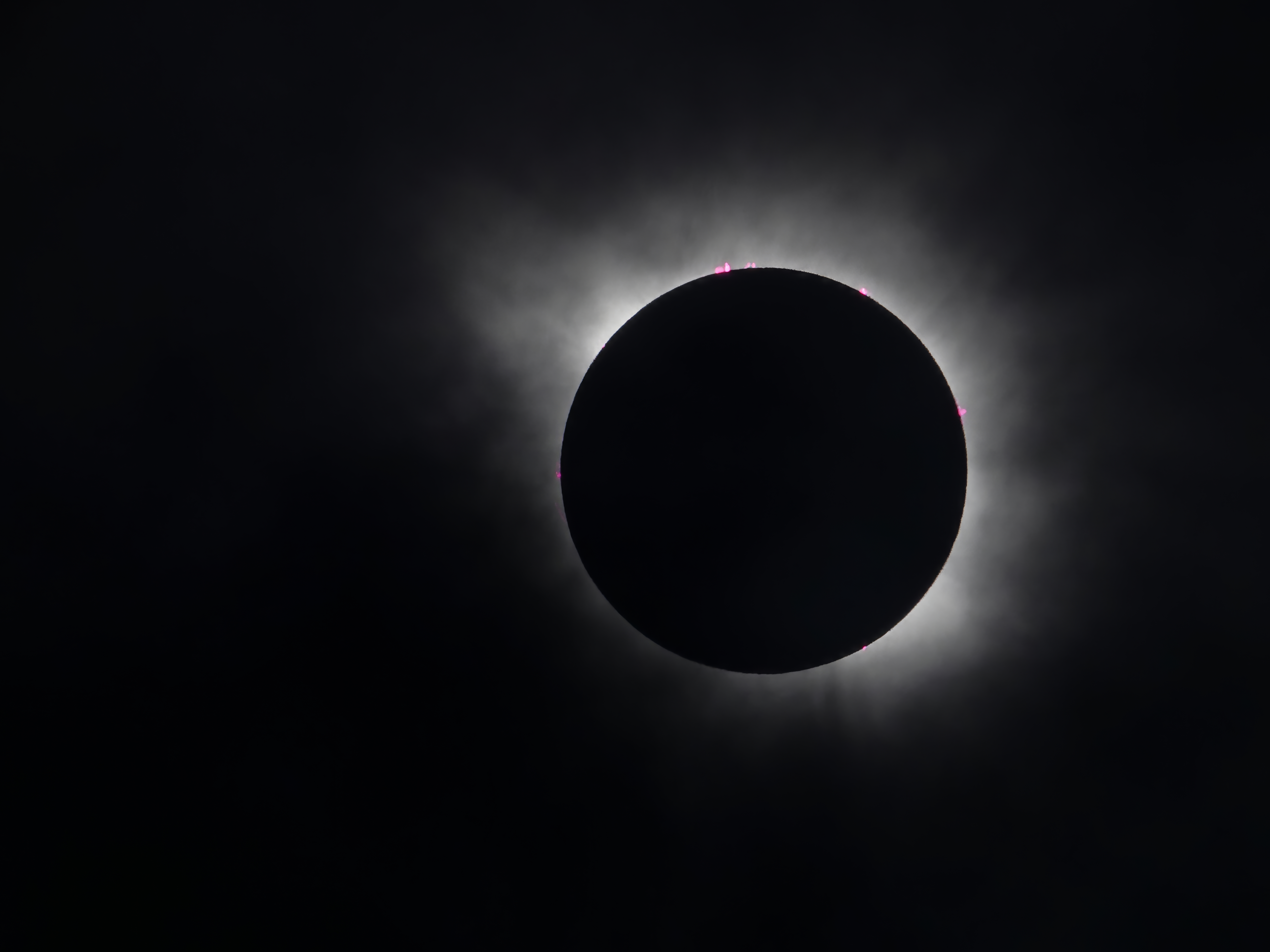
Photo of April 8, 2024 solar eclipse taken from Balcones Canyonlands National Wildlife Refuge, Texas with an Olympus OM-D E-M1 Mark III, at 400 mm

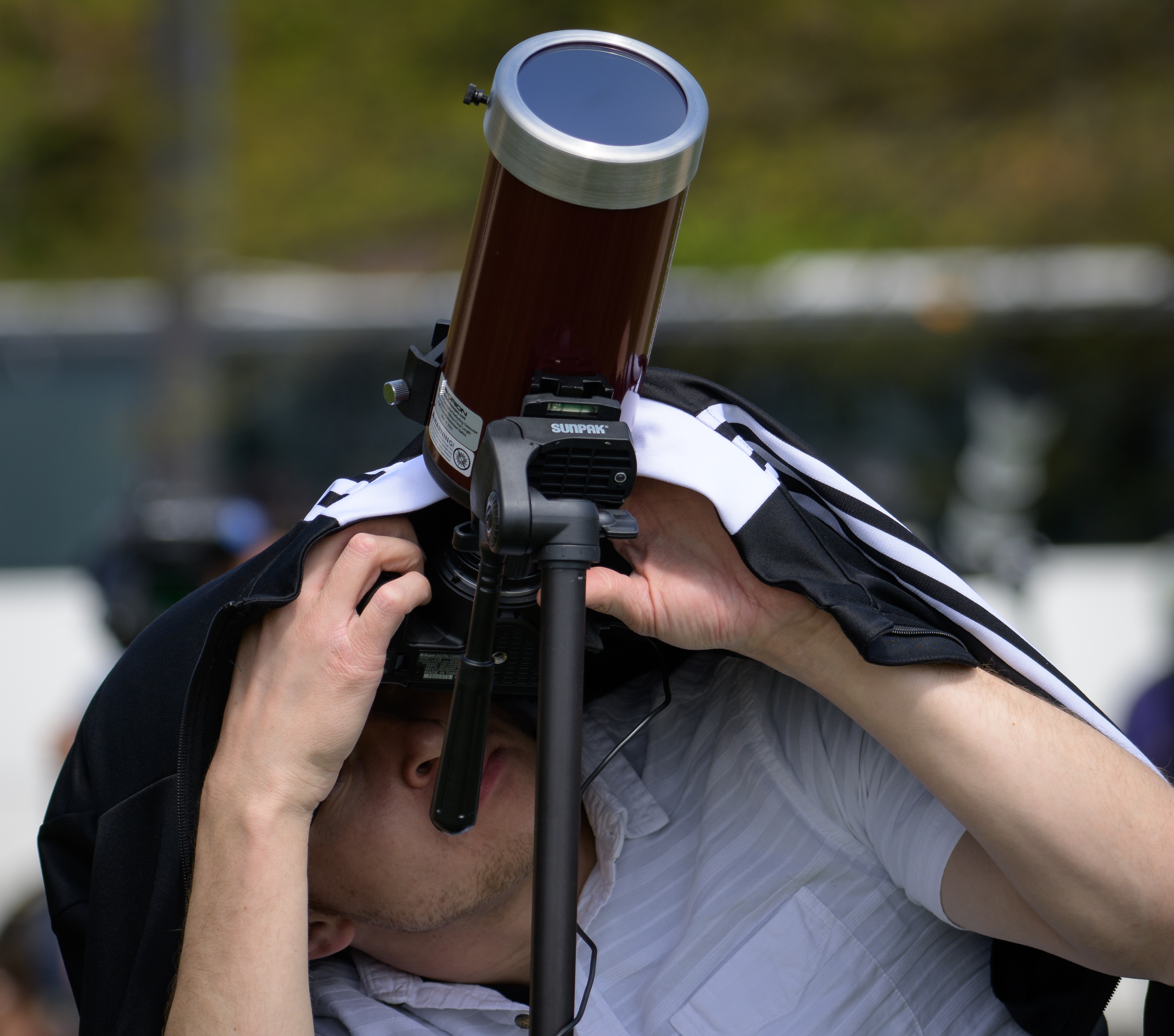
Photo being taken through a telescope with filter, April 8, 2024

Eclipse photography involves the photographic capturing of solar eclipses and lunar eclipses. This niche field combines elements of astronomy, astrophotography, and sometimes travel photography, as photographers often venture to specific locations to capture these celestial events. Because of the intensity of the sun and the quickly changing conditions, eclipse photography necessitates the use of extremely strong solar filters, usually adhering to the ISO 12312-2 standard.

== History ==
Eclipse photography has a rich history dating back to the 19th century, with advancements in photographic technology and astronomical knowledge significantly impacting its development. The first known photograph of a solar eclipse was taken on July 28, 1851, by Johann Julius Friedrich Berkowski, using the daguerreotype process.

== Techniques ==
Photographers utilize various techniques to capture the different phases of an eclipse, often employing special equipment such as solar filters to protect the camera sensor and the photographer's eyes from the intense sunlight. Long focal lengths and tripods are also commonly used to stabilize the image and capture detailed shots of the celestial event.

== Challenges ==
Eclipse photography presents unique challenges, including the need for precise timing, specialized equipment, and often travel to remote locations. Weather conditions can also significantly impact the ability to capture these events.

== Notable photographers ==
- Fred Espenak - Known as "Mr. Eclipse," Espenak has documented over 20 solar eclipses and provides educational resources on eclipse photography.
- Miloslav Druckmüller - A mathematician and photographer known for his high-resolution images of solar eclipses, which reveal solar corona details usually invisible to the naked eye.
- Wendy Carlos - Better known for her electronic music work, Carlos has captured most of the solar eclipses between 1963 and 2002, including every one between 1973 and 1985, with her work having been exhibited by NASA and Sky & Telescope.
