= Fred Espenak =

American astrophysicist (1953–2025)

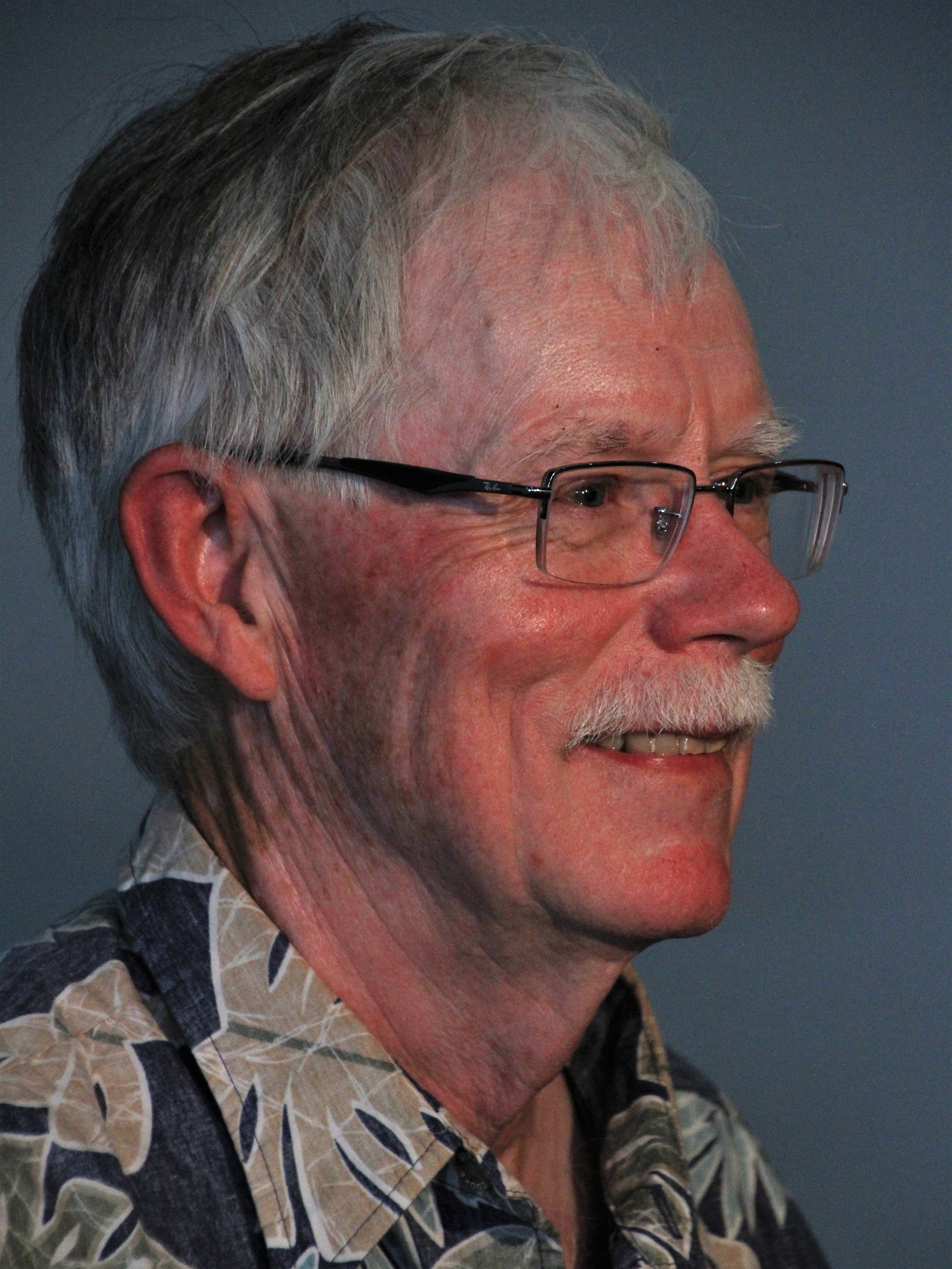
- Espenak in 2017
- Born: January 19, 1952; Annandale-on-Hudson, New York, U.S.
- Died: June 1, 2025 (aged 73); Portal, Arizona, U.S.
- Occupation: Astrophysicist
- Years active: 1978–2009
- Spouse: Patricia Totten
- Website: mreclipse.com

Fred Espenak Jr. (January 19, 1952 – June 1, 2025) was an American astrophysicist. He worked at the Goddard Space Flight Center and published extensively on eclipse predictions.

== Early life and career ==
Espenak was born in Annandale-on-Hudson, New York on January 19, 1952, and was brought up on Staten Island. He became interested in astronomy when he was 7–8 years old, and had his first telescope when he was around 9–10 years old. Espenak earned a bachelor's degree in physics from Wagner College, Staten Island, where he worked in the planetarium. His master's degree was from the University of Toledo, based on studies he did at Kitt Peak Observatory of eruptive and flare stars among red dwarfs.

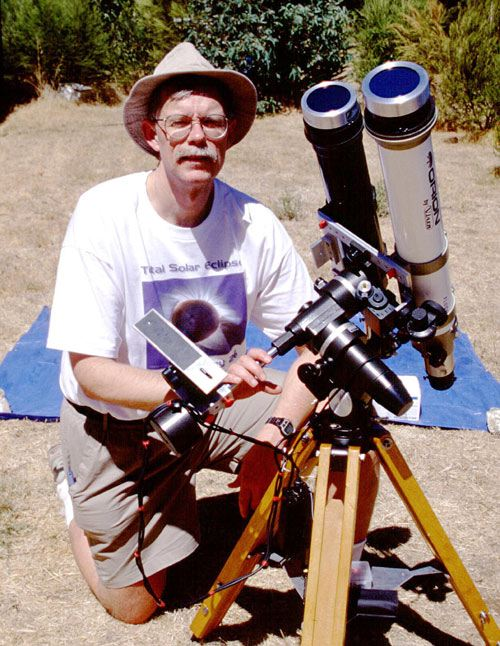
Espenak with his solar telescope in 2009

Espenak was employed at Goddard Space Flight Center, where he used infrared spectrometers to measure the atmospheres of planets in the Solar System. He provided NASA's eclipse bulletins starting in 1978. He was the author of several canonical works on eclipse predictions, such as the Fifty Year Canon of Solar Eclipses: 1986–2035 and Fifty Year Canon of Lunar Eclipses: 1986–2035, both of which are standard references on eclipses. The first eclipse he saw was the solar eclipse of March 7, 1970, which sparked his interest in eclipses, and he eventually saw over 20 eclipses.

Together with Jean Meeus, Espenak published the Five Millennium Canon of Solar Eclipses in 2006, which covers all types of solar eclipses (partial, total, annular, or hybrid) from 2000 BCE to 3000 CE, and the Five Millennium Canon of Lunar Eclipses in 2009, which lists all lunar eclipses (penumbral, partial, or total) in that time span. Later, he published the more compact Thousand Year Canon of Lunar Eclipses 1501 to 2500, the Thousand Year Canon of Solar Eclipses 1501 to 2500, and the 21st Century Canon of Solar Eclipses. He was also a co-author (with Mark Littmann and Ken Willcox) of Totality: Eclipses of the Sun.

Espenak gave public lectures on eclipses and astrophotography. Astronomical photographs taken by him have been published in National Geographic, Newsweek, Nature, New Scientist, and Ciel et Espace magazines.

He retired in 2009. Asteroid 14120 Espenak was named after him in 2003.

== Personal life and death ==
Espenak met Patricia Totten while in India in 1995. They married in 2006.

On April 15, 2025, Espenak announced on his Facebook page that he had idiopathic pulmonary fibrosis, his health was declining rapidly, and that he would immediately be entering hospice care. Doctors determined that the disease had progressed too far for a lung transplant. He died on June 1, 2025, in hospice care at his home in Portal, Arizona. He was 73.

== See also ==
- Saros (astronomy)
