= Julius Berkowski =

First known photographer of a solar eclipse

- Born: Johann Julius Friedrich Berkowski
- Occupation: Photographer

Johann Julius Friedrich Berkowski was a Prussian photographer. He was best known for taking the first photograph of the solar eclipse with a small refracting telescope.
