= Economy of Bristol =

Economy of city and county in England

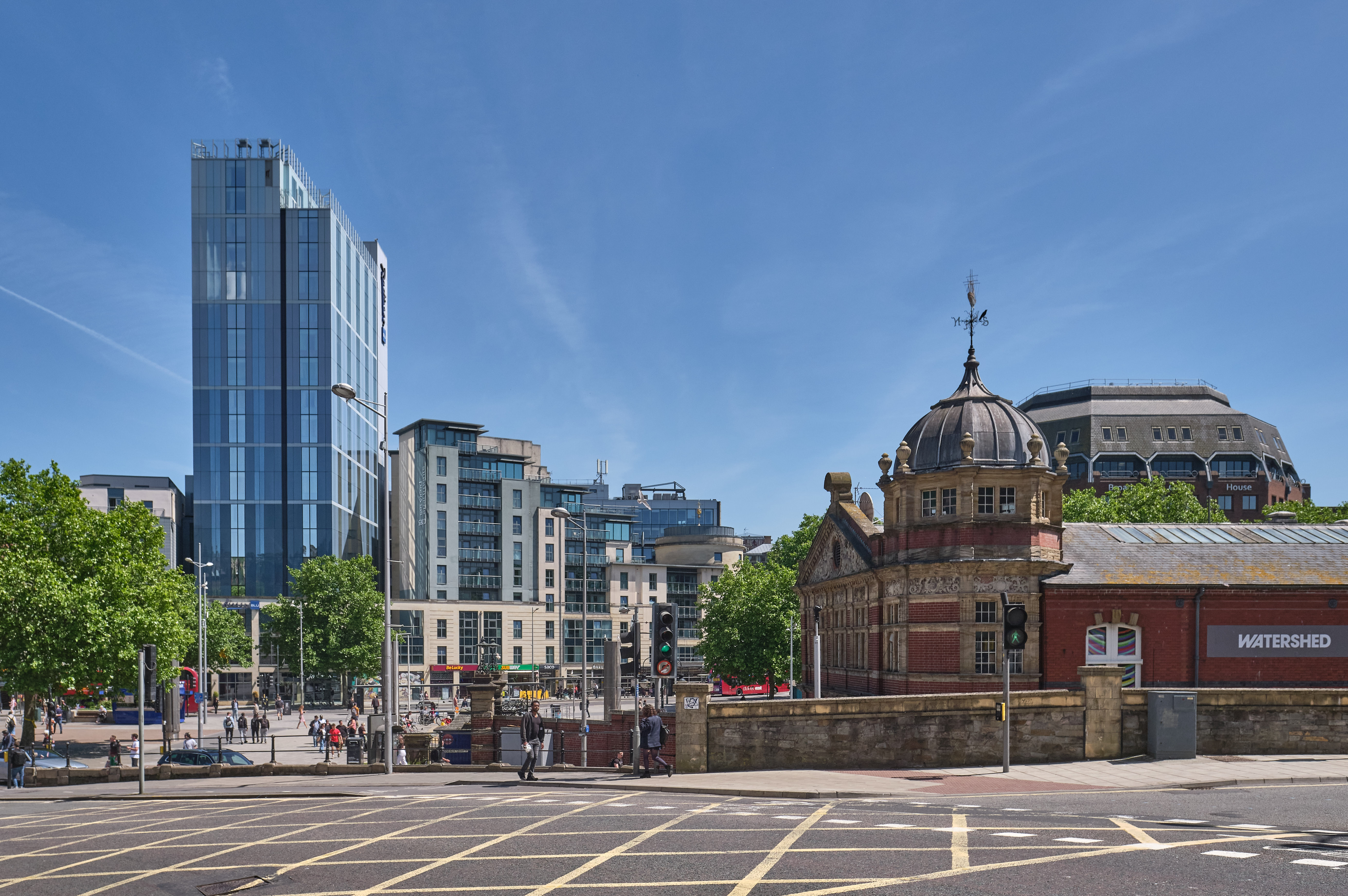
- Bristol City Centre

Statistics
- Population: 482,998 (2023)
- GDP: £22.8 billion (2023)
- GDP per capita: £47,148 (2023)

Bristol is a city in south west England. Its economy has long connections with the sea and its ports. In the 20th century aeronautics played an important role in the economy, and the city still plays a role in the manufacture of aircraft. Bristol is also a tourist destination, and has significant media, information technology and financial services sectors. Reports released in 2018 showed that the city is growing exponentially with a projected 2.3 percent annual growth rate until 2020.

== History ==
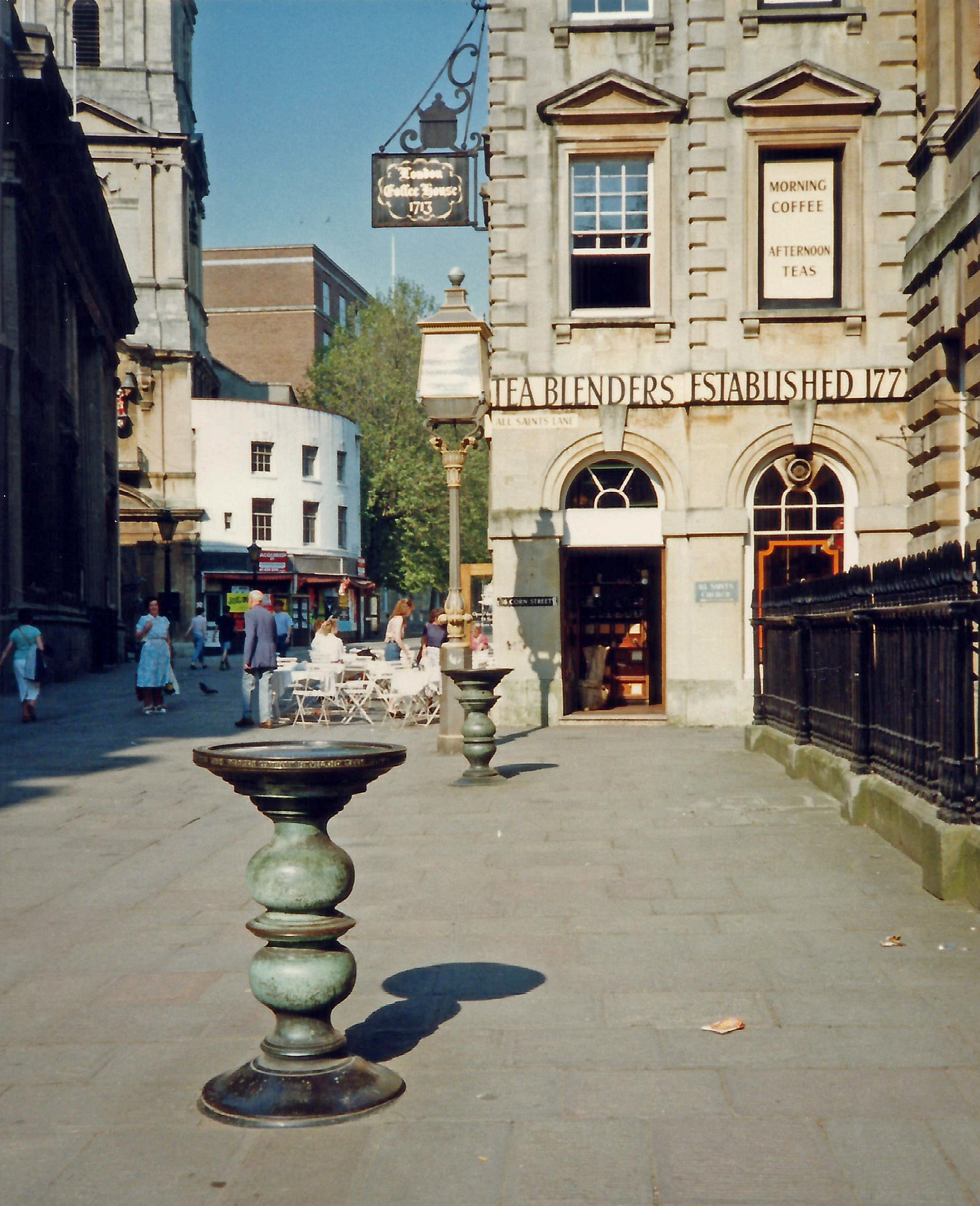
Two of the four Nails (bronze tables used for conducting business) in Corn Street

Bristol has a long history of trade, originally exporting wool cloth and importing fish, wine, grain and dairy products; later imports were tobacco, tropical fruits and plantation goods. Major imports are motor vehicles, grain, timber, produce and petroleum products. Since the 13th century, the rivers have been modified for docks; during the 1240s, the Frome was diverted into a deep, human-made channel (known as Saint Augustine's Reach) which flowed into the River Avon.

Ships occasionally departed Bristol for Iceland as early as 1420, and speculation exists that sailors (fishermen who landed on the Canadian coast to salt/ smoke their catch) from Bristol made landfall in the Americas before Christopher Columbus or John Cabot. Beginning in the early 1480s, the Bristol Society of Merchant Venturers sponsored exploration of the North Atlantic in search of trading opportunities. In 1552, Edward VI granted a royal charter to the Merchant Venturers to manage the port. Among explorers to depart from the port after Cabot were Martin Frobisher, Thomas James, after whom James Bay, on southern coast of Hudson Bay is named, and Martin Pring, who discovered Cape Cod and the southern New England coast in 1603.

By 1670 the city had 6,000 tons of shipping (of which half was imported tobacco). Bristol was one of England's main slave-trading hubs and that by the early 18th century, this trade accounted for half of the city's entire income. It steadily increased its market share so that at its peak, it claimed 70 percent of the slave voyages to America. Financial institutions emerged to support it and while the slave trade has long been abolished, the banks have persisted. This is seen in the way the city enjoys one of the highest concentrations of finance jobs in the United Kingdom today.

When the slave trade ceased, Bristol began transitioning into a manufacturing city during the age of Industrial Revolution. The rate, however, of growth was significantly lower than main industrial regions of Britain such as the Midlands and North. In the nineteenth century, the city's economy sustained a gradual decline. At the dawn of the twentieth century, it was 10th among the league of British cities. The economy began to pick up after this period especially with a series of economic reforms such as the change in the port administration. Industries began to thrive like those involved in the manufacture of cotton, tobacco, and chocolate as well as shipbuilding.

== GVA ==
GVA for Bristol 2002–2012
Year	GVA (£million)	Growth (%)
2002	8,463	▲5.8%
2003	8,812	▲4.1%
2004	9,149	▲3.8%
2005	9,599	▲4.9%
2006	9,928	▲3.4%
2007	10,759	▲8.4%
2008	10,949	▲1.8%
2009	11,110	▲1.5%
2010	11,924	▲7.3%
2011	11,550	▼3.1%
2012	11,740	▲1.6%

In 2012, Bristol's gross value added (GVA) was £11.7bn, accounting for 21.8% of the GVA of the Gloucestershire, Wiltshire and Bristol/Bath area, 11.6% of the GVA of South West England, and 0.8% of the GVA of the UK. The economy of Bristol fared comparatively well during the Great Recession of 2008–10 and continued to grow while most cities shrank, but in 2011 the economy contracted by 3.1%. Whilst Bristol's economy is in recovery, it remains 1.5% behind its peak output in 2010.

Compared with other major cities, Bristol enjoys a high GVA per head value, £27,148, the highest amongst the Core Cities and overall fifth highest in the United Kingdom after London, Edinburgh, Belfast and Glasgow.

Total GVA and GVA per head, 2012
Area	GVA (£million)	Annual GVA growth (%)	GVA (£ per head)	GVA per head growth (%)
Bristol	11,740	▲1.6%	27,148	▲0.6%
Gloucestershire, Wiltshire and Bristol/Bath area	53,746	▲1.9%	22,663	▲1.0%
Core Cities average^{1}	17,040	▲2.3%	21,927	▲1.3%

^{1}excluding Bristol, included Birmingham, Leeds, Liverpool, Manchester, Newcastle, Nottingham and Sheffield

== Productivity ==
GVA per employee in Bristol was estimated to be £33,900 in 2012. Compared with other major cities, it is relatively low, behind all other major cities in the United Kingdom. Between 2007 and 2012, productivity in Bristol shrank 4%.

GVA per employee, 2012
Area	GVA per worker (£)	% change 2007–12
Bristol	33,900	▼4%
Core Cities average^{2}	41,900	▲12.4%

^{2}excluding Bristol, included Birmingham, Leeds, Liverpool, Manchester, Newcastle, Nottingham and Sheffield

== Employment trends ==
In 2000 Bristol's unemployment rate was 5.9%, compared to 4.8% for the south west, 5.8% for England, and 6.0% for the United Kingdom. In 2005 this was down to 5.2%, compared to 3.6% for the South West and 4.8% for the United Kingdom.

In 2000, employment in the former County of Avon area was categorised into the following sectors:

Sector	Employees	%
Public services	134,699	27.5
Business & financial services	95,604	19.5
Wholesale & retail	76,972	15.7
Manufacturing	64,538	13.2
Transport & communications	36,248	7.4
Construction	33,939	6.9
Hotels & restaurants	25,580	5.2
Primary industry	5,522	1.1
Other	16,198	3.3

Recent employment figures released by the Office for National Statistics Office stated that the South West region has posted a 79.4 percent employment rate, which is higher than the rest of the country, including major cities such as London and the South East.

== Aeronautics ==
In the 20th century, Bristol's manufacturing activities expanded to include aircraft production at Filton, six miles (9.7 km) north of the city centre, by the Bristol Aeroplane Company, and aero-engine manufacture by Bristol Aero Engines (later Rolls-Royce) at Patchway. The aeroplane company became famous for the World War I Bristol Fighter, and Second World War Blenheim and Beaufighter aircraft. In the 1950s it became one of the country's major manufacturers of civil aircraft, with the Bristol Freighter and Britannia and the huge Brabazon airliner.

In the 1960s Filton played a key role in the Anglo-French Concorde supersonic airliner project. Concorde components were manufactured in British and French factories and shipped to the two final assembly plants by road, sea and air. The French assembly lines were in Toulouse in southern France with the British lines in Filton. The very large three-bay hangar built for the Bristol Brabazon was available for Concorde production.

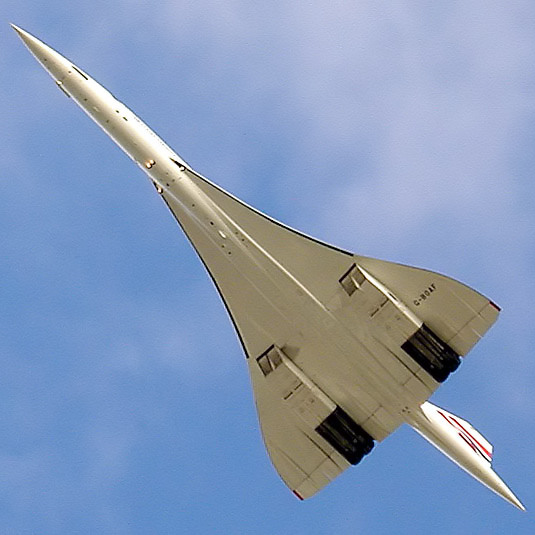
The last ever flight of any Concorde, 26 November 2003. The aircraft is seen a few minutes before landing on the Filton runway from which she first flew in 1969.

The French manufactured the centre fuselage and centre wing and the British the nose, rear fuselage, fin and wingtips. The largest proportion of the British share of the work was the powerplant, the Rolls-Royce/Snecma 593. The engine's manufacture was split between British Aircraft Corporation, Rolls-Royce (Filton) and SNECMA at Villaroche near Paris.

The British Concorde prototype G-BSST made its 22-minute maiden flight from Filton to RAF Fairford on 9 April 1969, the French prototype F-WTSS had flown from Toulouse five weeks earlier. Most of the employees of BAC and Rolls-Royce, plus a huge crowd, watched from around the airfield. Fairford was chosen as the test airfield for Concorde because the runway at Filton was rejected for test flying, its length was inadequate and there were problems with the slope, and the first 1,000 feet (300 m) of the runway at its eastern (A38) end could not be used. However, from the end of 1977, all test flying on the second production aircraft G-BBDG was done from Filton, following the closure of the BAC Fairford test base.

In 2003 the two airlines using Concorde (British Airways and Air France) and the company supplying spares and support (Airbus) made the decision to cease flying the aircraft and to retire them to locations (mostly museums) around the world. For the location of all the aircraft see Concorde.

On 26 November 2003, Concorde 216 (G-BOAF) made the final ever Concorde flight, returning to Filton airfield to be kept there permanently as the centrepiece of a projected air museum. This museum will include the existing Bristol Aero Collection which until May 2012 operated a public museum in a hangar at Kemble Airfield, forty miles (64 km) from Filton. This collection includes Bristol-built helicopters and missiles The major aeronautical companies in Bristol now are BAE Systems, Airbus and Rolls-Royce, both based at Filton.

Another important aeronautical company in the city is Cameron Balloons, a manufacturer of hot air balloons. Annually, in August, the city is host to the Bristol International Balloon Fiesta, one of Europe's largest hot air balloon events.

== Port ==
The Bristol Port Company operates the surviving commercial docks of the Port of Bristol at Portbury and Avonmouth. Since privatisation in 1991 trade has increased to 12 million tonnes per annum, with a revenue exceeding £75 million, making it the fifteenth largest port in the UK, tenth largest in England. The main trades are forest products, cars, containers, bulk (coal, grain, animal feeds, aggregates), liquids (petroleum, aviation fuel, molasses, fruit juice), metals, and fresh produce. Plans are in place to massively increase capacity by building a new deepsea container terminal capable of handling ships up to 12,000 TEU.

== Film and TV production ==
Bristol has long been a major BBC production centre, based at Broadcasting House, renowned for its BBC Natural History Unit, and is a base of ITV Wales & West. Oscar-winning Aardman Animations was established in 1972 in Bristol. In 2010, The Bottle Yard Studios was opened in partnership with Bristol City Council, which in 2021 was credited with helping achieve about a tripling of drama production in Bristol since 2010. One of the two Channel 4 Creative Hubs opened in 2020 in Finzels Reach.

== Tobacco ==
As one of the largest ports in the UK, Bristol became very important in the tobacco trade. It is still the headquarters of Imperial Tobacco Group, the world's fourth largest international tobacco company. Imperial's group headquarters was consolidated into a new award-winning premises designed by architects AWW inspired environments and is located on the Winterstoke Road.

== Former industries ==
=== Bristol Cars ===
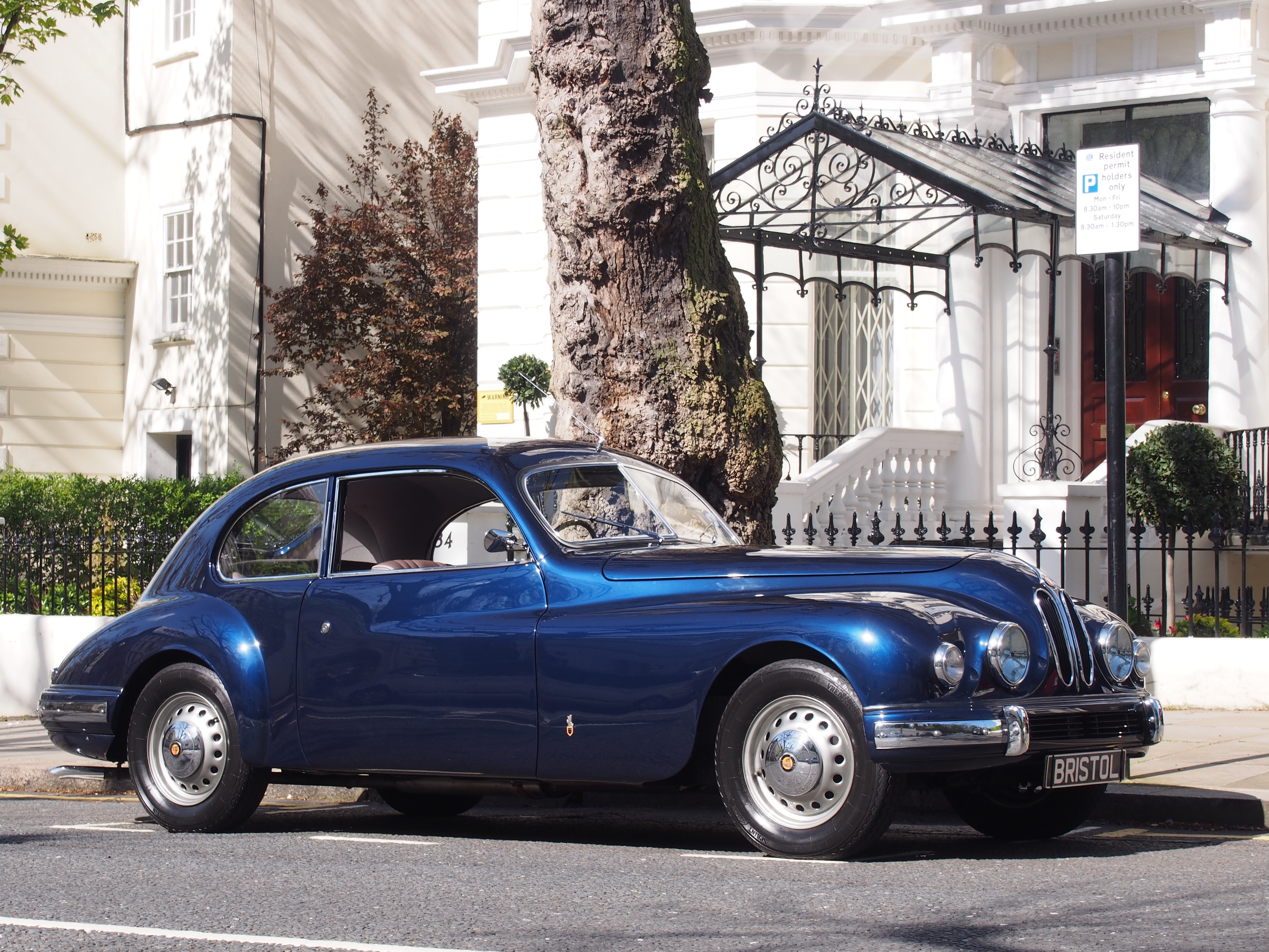
1952 Bristol 401

The Bristol Aeroplane Company diversified into car manufacturing in the 1940s, building luxury hand-built cars at their factory in Filton, under the name Bristol Cars. The car manufacturer became independent from the Bristol Aeroplane Company in 1960. The company ceased manufacturing in March 2011 when it called in the receivers.

=== Coal mining ===
During the 19th century coal mining was important in parts of Bristol providing the energy for manufacturing industry. The coal field is part of a large area which stretched from the Somerset coalfield into Gloucestershire. All pits have now closed.
