= Delta Museum =

Delta Museum may refer to:

- Delta Blues Museum, a blues museum in Clarksdale, Mississippi
- Delta Flight Museum, an aviation museum in Atlanta, Georgia
- Musée Delta, an aviation museum in Athis-Mons, France
