= Concorde operational history =

Supersonic airliner history (1976–2003)

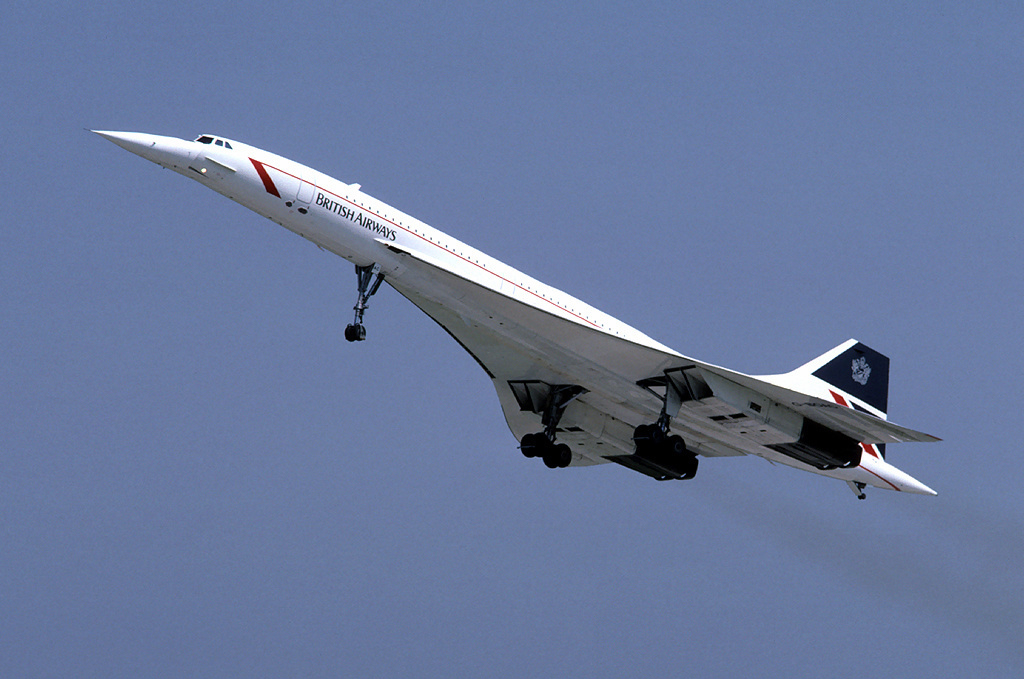
Concorde G-BOAC in 1986

Concorde began scheduled flights with British Airways (BA) and Air France (AF) on 21 January 1976. AF flew its last commercial flight on 31 May 2003 with BA retiring its Concorde fleet on 24 October 2003.

== Concorde 001 solar eclipse mission ==
Concorde 001 was modified with rooftop portholes and equipped with observation instruments for use during the solar eclipse of June 30, 1973. It performed the longest observation of a solar eclipse to date, about 74 minutes.

== Scheduled flights ==
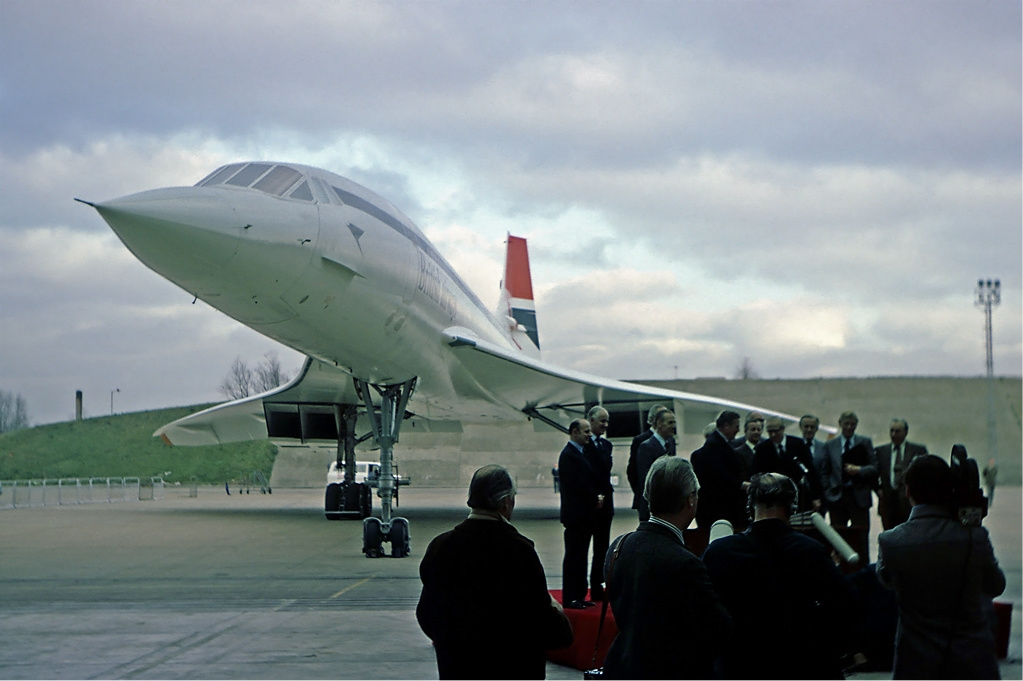
The official handover ceremony of British Airways' first Concorde occurred on 15 January 1976 at Heathrow Airport.

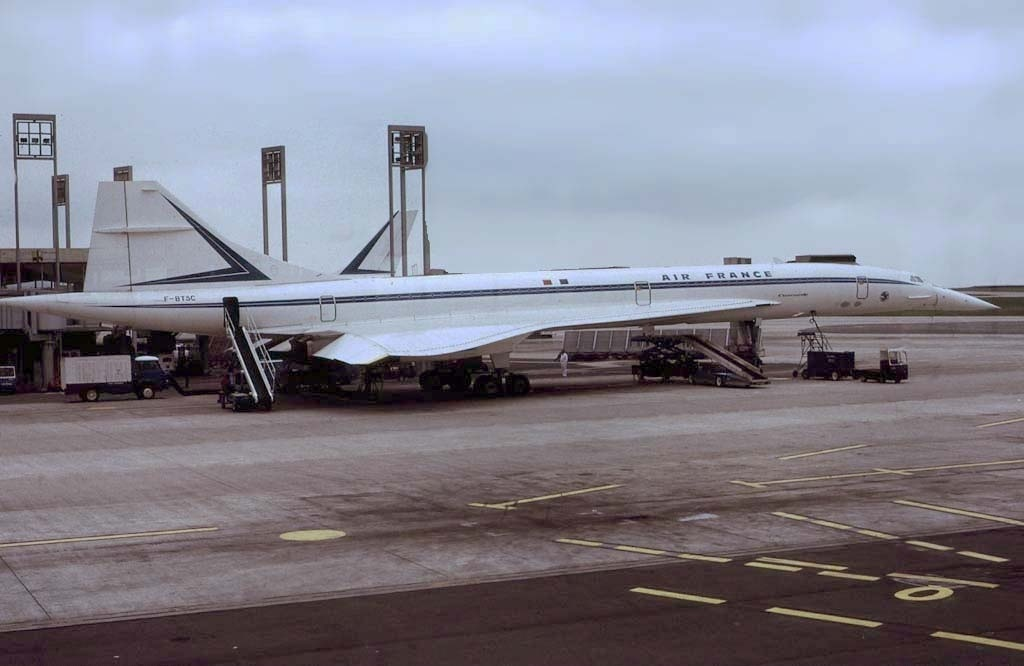
Air France Concorde (F-BTSC) at Charles de Gaulle Airport on 25 July 1975, exactly 25 years before the accident in 2000

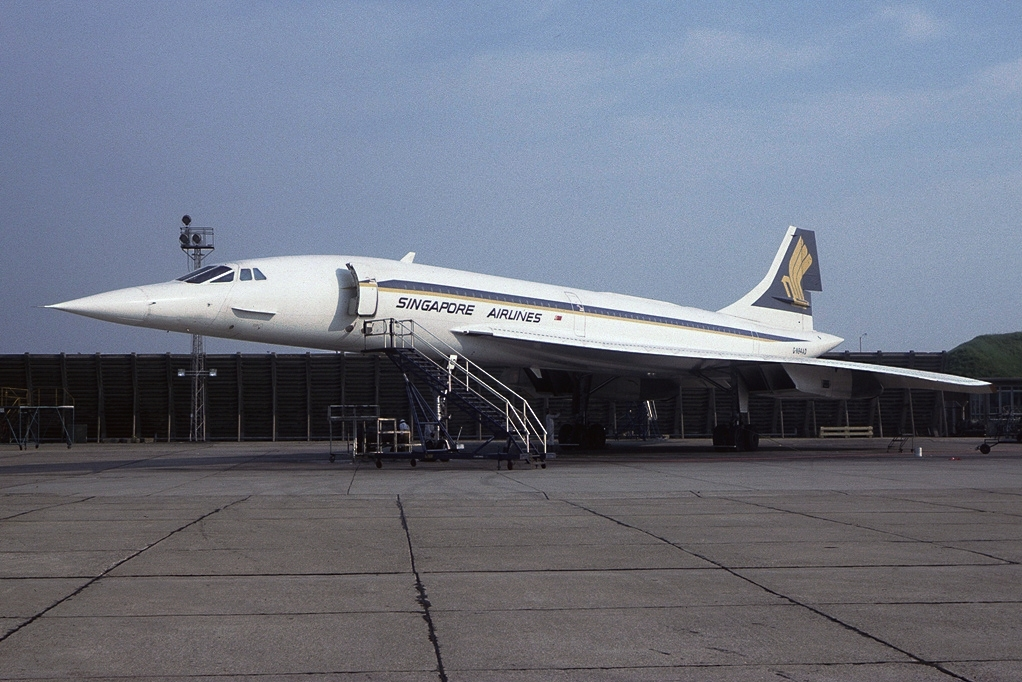
British Airways Concorde in Singapore Airlines livery at Heathrow Airport in 1979

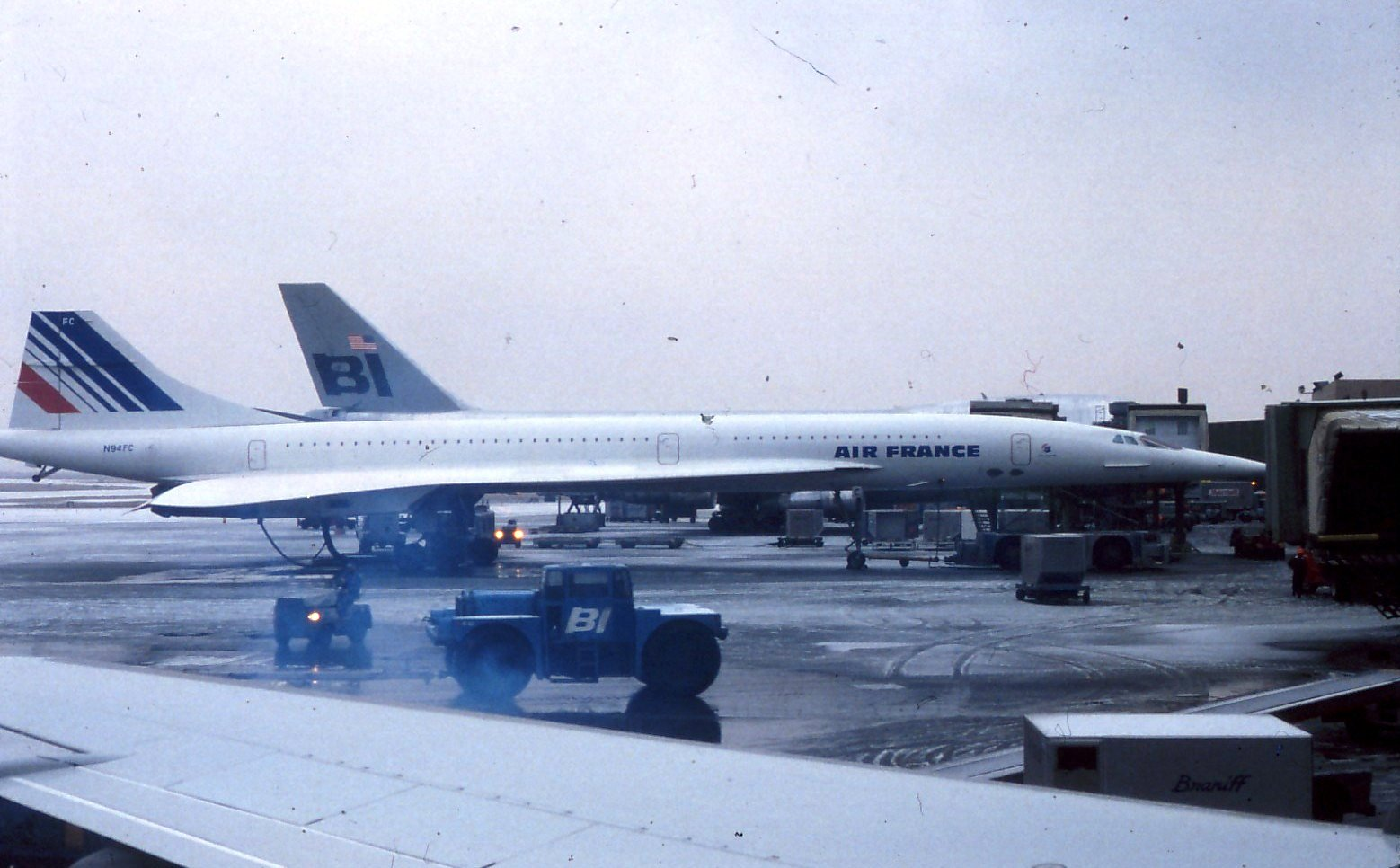
Air France Concorde (F-BVFC) with the temporary designation N94FC while operating for Braniff International Airways, at Dallas Fort Worth Airport in February 1980

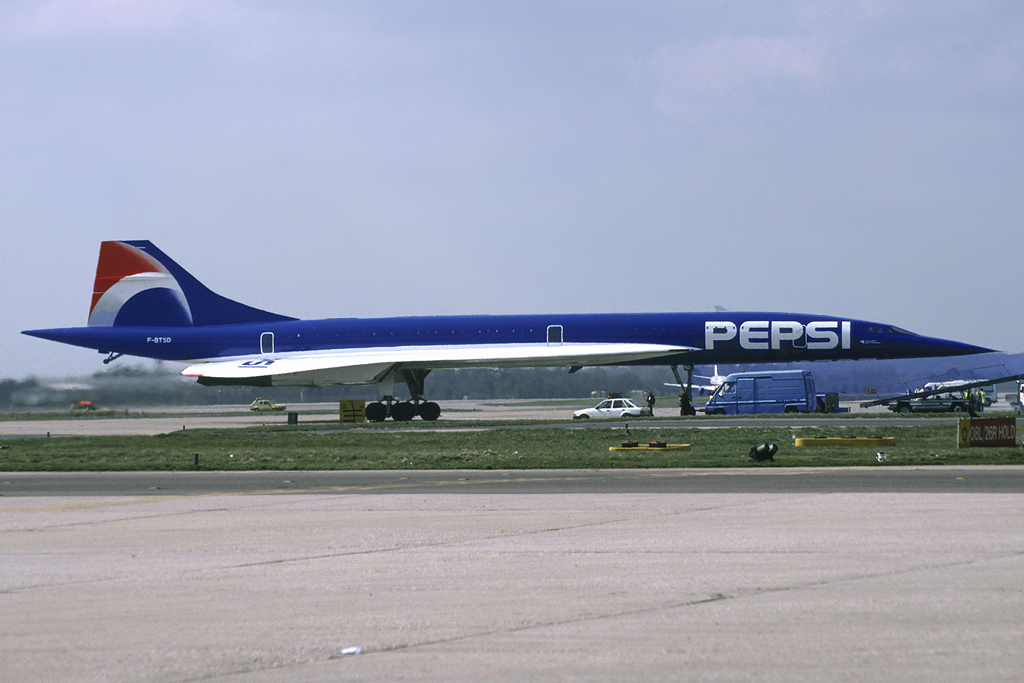
Air France Concorde (F-BTSD) with a short-lived promotional Pepsi livery in 1996

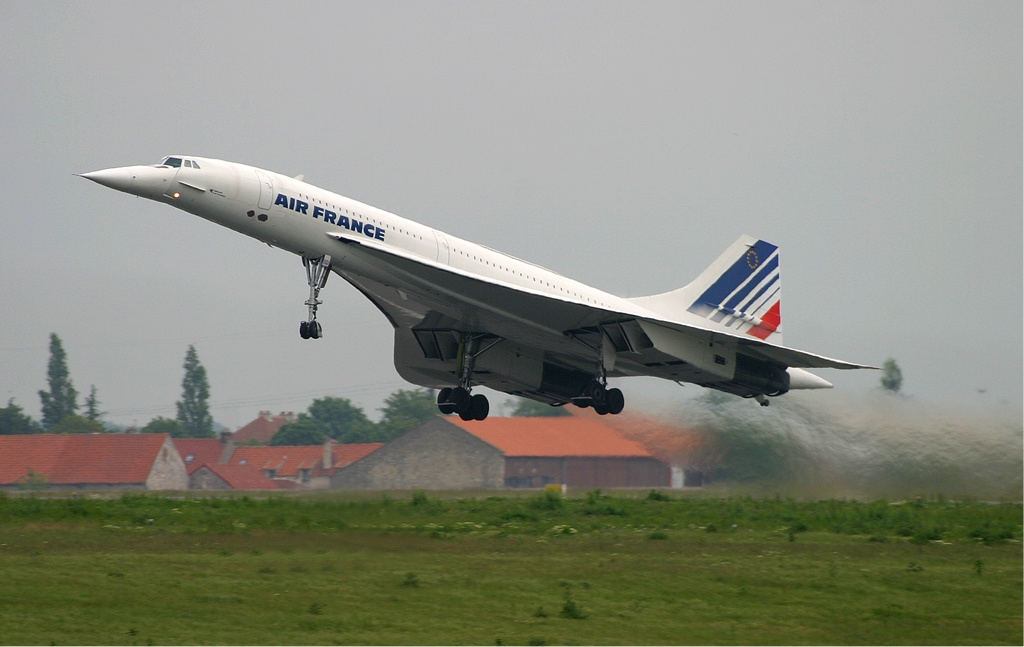
Air France Concorde departing Charles de Gaulle Airport in 2003

Scheduled flights began on 21 January 1976 on the London–Bahrain and Paris–Rio de Janeiro (via Dakar) routes, with BA flights using the Speedbird Concorde call sign to notify air traffic control of the aircraft's unique abilities and restrictions, but the French using their normal call signs. The Paris-Caracas route (via Azores) began on 10 April. The US Congress had just banned Concorde landings in the US, mainly due to citizen protest over sonic booms, preventing launch on the coveted North Atlantic routes. The US Secretary of Transportation, William Coleman, gave permission for Concorde service to Dulles International Airport, and Air France and British Airways simultaneously began a thrice-weekly service to Dulles on 24 May 1976. Due to low demand, AF cancelled its Washington service in October 1982, while BA cancelled it in November 1994.

When the US ban on JFK Concorde operations was lifted in February 1977, New York banned Concorde locally. The ban came to an end on 17 October 1977 when the Supreme Court of the United States declined to overturn a lower court's ruling rejecting efforts by the Port Authority of New York and New Jersey and a grass-roots campaign led by Carol Berman to continue the ban. Despite complaints about noise, the report noted that Air Force One, at the time a Boeing VC-137, was louder than Concorde at subsonic speeds and during takeoff and landing. Scheduled service from Paris and London to New York's John F. Kennedy Airport began on 22 November 1977.

In December 1977, BA and Singapore Airlines started sharing a Concorde for flights between London and Singapore International Airport at Paya Lebar via Bahrain. The aircraft, BA's Concorde G-BOAD, was painted in Singapore Airlines livery on the left side and BA livery on the right side. The service was discontinued after three return flights because of noise complaints from the Malaysian government; it could only be reinstated on a new route bypassing Malaysian airspace in 1979. A dispute with India prevented Concorde from reaching supersonic speeds in Indian airspace, so the route was eventually declared not viable and discontinued in 1980.

During the Mexican oil boom, AF flew Concorde twice weekly to Mexico City's Mexico City International Airport via Washington, DC, or New York City, from September 1978 to November 1982. The worldwide economic crisis during that period resulted in this route's cancellation; the last flights were almost empty. The routing between Washington or New York and Mexico City included a deceleration, from Mach 2.02 to Mach 0.95, to cross Florida subsonically and avoid creating a sonic boom over the state; Concorde then re-accelerated back to high speed while crossing the Gulf of Mexico. On 1 April 1989, on an around-the-world luxury tour charter, BA implemented changes to this routing that allowed G-BOAF to maintain Mach 2.02 by passing around Florida to the east and south. Periodically Concorde visited the region on similar chartered flights to Mexico City and Acapulco.

From December 1978 to May 1980, Braniff International Airways leased 11 Concordes, five from AF and six from BA. These were used on subsonic flights between Dallas–Fort Worth and Dulles International Airport, flown by Braniff flight crews. AF and BA crews then took over for the continuing supersonic flights to London and Paris. The aircraft were registered in both the United States and their home countries; the European registration was covered while being operated by Braniff, retaining full AF/BA liveries. The flights were not profitable and typically less than 50% booked, forcing Braniff to end its tenure as the only US Concorde operator in May 1980.

In its early years, BA's Concorde service had a greater number of "no-shows" (passengers who booked a flight and then failed to appear at the gate for boarding) than any other aircraft in the fleet.

=== British Caledonian interest ===
Following the launch of British Airways Concorde services, Britain's other major airline, British Caledonian (BCal), set up a task force headed by Gordon Davidson, BA's former Concorde director, to investigate the possibility of their own Concorde operations. This was seen as particularly viable for the airline's long-haul network as there were two unsold aircraft then available for purchase.

One important reason for BCal's interest in Concorde was that the British Government's 1976 aviation policy review had opened the possibility of BA setting up supersonic services in competition with BCal's established sphere of influence. To counteract this potential threat, BCal considered their own independent Concorde plans, as well as a partnership with BA. BCal were considered most likely to have set up a Concorde service on the Gatwick–Lagos route, a major source of revenue and profits within BCal's scheduled route network; BCal's Concorde task force did assess the viability of a daily supersonic service complementing the existing subsonic widebody service on this route.

BCal entered into a bid to acquire at least one Concorde. However, BCal eventually arranged for two aircraft to be leased from BA and Aérospatiale respectively, to be maintained by either BA or AF. BCal's envisaged two-Concorde fleet would have required a high level of aircraft usage to be cost-effective; therefore, BCal had decided to operate the second aircraft on a supersonic service between Gatwick and Atlanta, with a stopover at either Gander or Halifax. Consideration was given to services to Houston and various points on its South American network at a later stage. Both supersonic services were to be launched at some point during 1980; however, steeply rising oil prices caused by the 1979 energy crisis led to BCal shelving their supersonic ambitions.

=== British Airways buys its Concordes outright ===
By around 1981 in the UK, the future for Concorde looked bleak. The British government had lost money operating Concorde every year, and moves were afoot to cancel the service entirely. A cost projection came back with greatly reduced metallurgical testing costs because the test rig for the wings had built up enough data to last for 30 years and could be shut down. Despite this, the government was not keen to continue. In 1983, BA's managing director, Sir John King, convinced the government to sell the aircraft outright to the then state-owned British Airways for £16.5 million (US$25.01 million) plus the first year's profits. In 2003, in a radio interview with Alan Robb on BBC Radio 5 Live, Lord Heseltine, the minister then responsible, acknowledged that the plane was sold "next to nothing" and agreed the deal was among the most disastrous conducted by a government minister; "but if you have your hands tied behind your back and no cards and a very skilful negotiator on the other side of the table... I defy you to do any [better]."

=== Operating economics ===
Its estimated operating costs were $3,800 per block hour in 1972 (equivalent to $29,248 in 2025), compared to actual 1971 operating costs of $1,835 for a 707 and $3,500 for a 747 (equivalent to $14,588 and $27,825, respectively); for a 3,050 nmi (5,650 km) London–New York sector, a 707 cost $13,750 or 3.04¢ per seat/nmi (in 1971 dollars), a 747 $26,200 or 2.4¢ per seat/nmi and Concorde $14,250 or 4.5¢ per seat/nmi. On a transatlantic flight, having a cruising speed of more than double a B-707, Concorde required less than half the number of block hours per trip. This illustrates that these two aircraft types were designed for entirely different flight regimes (subsonic versus supersonic) and different markets, so a direct comparison is not possible. A more direct operating cost per seat mile would be against a subsonic first class seat while factoring twice the flight time as a cost increasing component.

In 1983, Pan Am accused the British Government of subsidising BA Concorde air fares, on which a return London–New York was £2,399 (£8,157 in 2025 prices), compared to £1,986 (£6,752) with a subsonic first class return, and London–Washington return was £2,426 (£8,248) instead of £2,258 (£7,677) subsonic. However, by this time, Concorde was operating in its own P&L division with no subsidy available to it.

Concorde's unit cost was then $33.8 million ($192 million in 2024 dollars). BA and AF benefited from a significantly reduced purchase price from the manufacturing consortium via their respective governments.

After six years of on and off profitability, in 1982 Concorde was established in its own operating division (Concorde Division) under Capt. Brian Walpole and Capt. Jock Lowe. Their research revealed that regular passengers thought that the fare was higher than it actually was (business travellers were the majority of passengers), so the airline raised ticket prices to match these perceptions and, following the marketing research and repositioning, Concorde ran profitably for BA. The ticket price was pitched about 10–15% above subsonic first class (1996 £4,772 versus subsonic first class £4,314) adding to its corporate appeal and ensuring loyalty from regular users which brought regular load factors of around 80%.

Over the next twenty years, BA's Concordes earned over half a billion pounds in profit with (typically) just five aircraft operating and two in various maintenance cycles.

=== Special flights to East Germany ===
Air France and Interflug shared the same office building in Paris in the 1980s. Due to their socialistic persuasions, both of them developed kinships for each other. The Air France staff proposed limited Concorde service to Leipzig during the Leipziger Buchmesse (Leipzig book fair), carrying business people. The East German government agreed to allow the Concorde flights to Leipzig and made the special accommodations for the “friendship flights”. Klaus Henkes, the deputy transport minister and the former general director of Interflug, was one of the most powerful East German governmental officials, and he made the quick arrangements and granted the special flight certificate for the Concorde flights within East Germany.

The Yalta Conference of 1945 stipulated a lot of restrictions about flying over East Germany to Berlin (West) from West Germany. Additionally, the stipulations did not allow the Allies-designated airways such as Air France to divert from one of three corridors to other aeroports in East Germany. Instead, Concorde entered East Germany from the Baltic Sea via Denmark.

Mr Henkes also allowed the Concorde to fly at Mach 1.5 over East Germany prior to arrival at Leipzig aeroport during its first flight as this specific route was designated as military flight practice with fighters flying at supersonic speed. The overland speed record by the passenger aeroplane over the European land remains unbroken to this day.

About 30,000 to 40,000 East Germans showed up at and around the aeroport along with many employees stopping their jobs to witness the momentous event of first Concorde landing on 18 March 1986.

Air France made the several flights during the Leipziger Buchmesse in the spring and autumn until 1990 while British Airways made a single return flight between London and Leipzig with its G-BOAF two days later on 20 March. Leipzig aeroport remains the only one in the Communist Bloc that served Concorde and only one in Germany that received the frequent Concorde flights.

=== Other services ===
Between March 1984 and January 1991, BA flew a thrice-weekly Concorde service between London and Miami, stopping at Dulles International Airport. Until 2003, AF and BA continued to operate the New York services daily. From 1987 to 2003, BA flew a Saturday morning Concorde service to Grantley Adams International Airport, Barbados, during the summer and winter holiday season.

Prior to the crash of Air France Flight 4590, several UK and French tour operators operated charter flights to European destinations on a regular basis; the charter business was viewed as lucrative by BA and AF.

Air France staged two special round-the-world Concorde flights in 1992 and 1995. The first, dubbed Flight 1492 and performed on 12–13 October 1992 to mark the 500th anniversary of Christopher Columbus' first voyage to the Americas, circled the globe in 32 hours and 49 minutes, setting a new world record for the fastest non-orbital circumnavigation of the Earth. The second flight, on 15–16 August 1995, improved this record by circumnavigating the Earth in 31 hours and 27 minutes. The 1995 record still stands as the fastest non-orbital circumnavigation in history.

In 1997, BA held a promotional contest to mark the 10th anniversary of the airline's move into the private sector. The promotion was a lottery to fly to New York held for 190 tickets valued at £5,400 each, to be offered at £10. Contestants had to call a special hotline to compete with up to 20 million people.

== Grounding and resumption of service ==
=== Air France Flight 4590 accident ===
On 25 July 2000, Air France Concorde F-BTSC crashed during takeoff from Charles de Gaulle Airport in Paris, killing all 109 people on board and 4 on the ground. It was the first fatal accident in the Concorde's history. Investigations of the accident determined that the plane had run over a small piece of metal debris on the runway during its takeoff roll, puncturing one of its front tyres. Part of the burst tyre then hit the plane's fuselage, causing one of its fuel tanks to rupture. The burning plane was already moving too quickly to abort takeoff, but it could not climb or accelerate, and it crashed into a nearby hotel. The Concorde was vulnerable to such accidents because of its high takeoff speed, and at least seven previous incidents involving burst tyres had caused serious damage to Concordes.

=== Grounding ===
The week before the Flight 4590 accident, British Airways grounded one of its Concordes, G-BOAE, after discovering a 66-millimetre-long (2.6 in) crack in an internal cross-beam of the plane's wing. On 23 July, BA disclosed that similar but smaller cracks had been discovered in all seven of its Concordes, but the airline said that the defects were not in "a safety-critical part of the plane" and did not ground the rest of the fleet. Aérospatiale said that cracks up to 50 millimetres (2.0 in) in length were safe. On 24 July, the day before the fatal accident, Air France disclosed that it had discovered similar cracks in four of its six Concordes. F-BTSC, the Concorde destroyed in the next day's crash, was one of the two that did not have this defect, and investigators quickly concluded that such cracks could not have played a role in the disaster.

Immediately after the Flight 4590 crash, Air France grounded the rest of its Concorde fleet while an investigation was carried out. British Airways cancelled all Concorde flights that evening, but after an inspection of its fleet, BA decided to resume Concorde service on 26 July.

The preliminary results of the French investigation, finding that the bursting of a single tyre had caused the accident, were known within weeks of the crash. Based on these findings, the British Civil Aviation Authority (CAA) informed British Airways on 15 August that it was preparing to revoke the Concorde's certificate of airworthiness the next day. At the time the notice was received, Concorde G-BOAB was preparing for takeoff on a runway at Heathrow; BA promptly recalled the plane to the gate and disembarked all passengers, although the crew was allowed to fly the plane to New York as scheduled.

=== Modifications and resumption of service ===
Both airlines planned to improve the safety of the aircraft rather than retire the Concorde. British Airways used G-BOAF, commonly known as "Alpha Foxtrot", to test modifications intended to prevent further accidents. These changes included Kevlar linings for the plane's fuel tanks, armour-plating around crucial electrical and hydraulic systems, and stronger tyres. The first test flight of the reinforced G-BOAF took place on 17 July 2001, leaving Heathrow Airport to the west, turning around near Iceland, and landing at RAF Brize Norton near London. Air France carried out the first test flight of its similarly modified Concorde F-BVFB on 24 August.

These tests were declared successful, and on 5 September 2001, the British CAA and the French Directorate General for Civil Aviation each issued a "mandatory airworthiness directive", allowing Concordes to return to passenger service as long as they were modified as G-BOAF and F-BVFB had been. BA carried out the first Concorde flight with passengers on 11 September, although all of these passengers were BA employees engaging in a dress rehearsal of a normal commercial flight. G-BOAF took off from Heathrow at 10:30 BST, turned around halfway across the Atlantic, and landed back at Heathrow at about 13:50 – almost exactly the same time that American Airlines Flight 11 crashed into the North Tower of the World Trade Center, beginning the September 11 attacks.

Commercial passenger service on the Concorde resumed on 7 November 2001. Air France Flight 2, F-BTSD, left Paris Charles de Gaulle Airport at its normal departure time, 10:30 CET, and landed at New York's John F. Kennedy Airport at 08:20 EST. British Airways Flight 1, G-BOAE, left London Heathrow one hour later at 10:30 GMT and arrived at JFK at 09:10 EST. The airlines had attempted to synchronize a simultaneous departure, as had been done at the beginning of revenue service in 1976, but airport scheduling made this impractical. British prime minister Tony Blair flew G-BOAF later that day from Heathrow to Washington, D.C., for a summit with U.S. president George W. Bush.

== Retirement ==
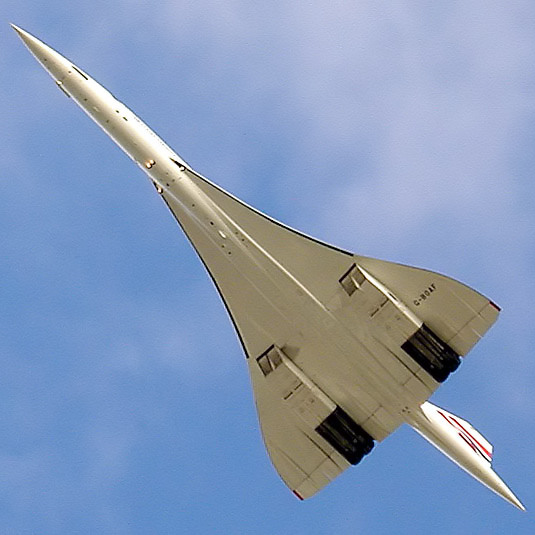
Concorde's final flight: G-BOAF from Heathrow to Bristol, on 26 November 2003. The extremely high fineness ratio of the fuselage is evident.

On 10 April 2003, Air France and British Airways simultaneously announced they would retire Concorde later that year. They cited low passenger numbers following the 25 July 2000 crash, the slump in air travel following the September 11 attacks, and rising maintenance costs: Airbus, the company that acquired Aérospatiale in 2000, had made a decision in 2003 to no longer supply replacement parts for the aircraft.

Concorde was technologically advanced when introduced in the 1970s, and while in 2003, its analogue cockpit may have appeared outdated, an upgrade was not necessary or a regulatory requirement, as it was still contemporary with other aircraft such as the Boeing 747-300 in service at the time. British Airways had completed patterning of replacement avionics spares with modern avionics equivalents and so had access to the necessary spares it needed to continue operations. The airframes had undergone a life extension survey that proved them to be in better than expected condition with the same number of flight cycles as an average 7 year old B-737 and BA, in conjunction with BAe and Aerospatiale, (dubbed Concorde Relife Group), had the airframe certified for continued operation until 2014/15. There had been little commercial pressure to upgrade Concorde due to its low flight cycles, a lack of competing aircraft and the fact that the aircraft remained sustainably profitable in its current configuration. By its retirement, it was the last aircraft in the British Airways fleet that had a flight engineer.

On 11 April 2003, Virgin Atlantic founder Sir Richard Branson announced that the company was interested in purchasing BA's Concorde fleet "for the same price that they were given them for – one pound". BA dismissed the idea, prompting Virgin to increase their offer to £1 million each. Branson claimed that when BA was privatised, a clause in the agreement required them to allow another British airline to operate Concorde if BA ceased to do so, but the Government denied the existence of such a clause. In October 2003, Branson wrote in The Economist that his final offer was "over £5 million" and that he had intended to operate the fleet "for many years to come". UK Civil Aviation Authority regulatory requirements would have only allowed Virgin Atlantic to add Concorde to its Air Operator Certificate after it demonstrated the engineering and aircrew expertise necessary to operate and sustain it.

It has been suggested that Concorde was not withdrawn for the reasons usually given but that it became apparent during the grounding of Concorde that the airlines could make more profit carrying first-class passengers subsonically. A lack of commitment to Concorde from Director of Engineering Alan MacDonald may have undermined BA's resolve to continue operating Concorde.

Other reasons why the attempted revival of Concorde never happened relate to the fact that the narrow fuselage did not allow for "luxury" features of subsonic air travel such as moving space, reclining seats and overall comfort. In the words of The Guardian's Dave Hall, "Concorde was an outdated notion of prestige that left sheer speed the only luxury of supersonic travel."

=== Air France ===
Air France made its final commercial Concorde landing in the United States in New York City from Paris on 30 May 2003. AF's final Concorde flight took place on 27 June 2003 when F-BVFC retired to Toulouse.

An auction of Concorde parts and memorabilia for AF was held at Christie's in Paris on 15 November 2003; 1,300 people attended, and several lots exceeded their predicted values. French Concorde F-BVFC was retired to Toulouse and kept functional for a short time after the end of service, in case taxi runs were required in support of the French judicial enquiry into the 2000 crash. The aircraft is now fully retired and no longer functional.

AF Concorde F-BTSD was retired to the Musée de l'air et de l'espace at Le Bourget Airport near Paris; unlike the other museum Concordes, a few of the systems are kept functional. For instance, the "droop nose" can still be lowered and raised. This led to rumours that they could be prepared for future flights for special occasions.

AF Concorde F-BVFB is at the Auto & Technik Museum Sinsheim at Sinsheim, Germany, after its last flight from Paris to Baden-Baden, followed by transport to Sinsheim via barge and road. The museum also has a Tupolev Tu-144 on display – this is the only place where both supersonic airliners can be seen together.

In 1989, AF signed a letter of agreement to donate a Concorde to the National Air and Space Museum in Washington D.C. upon the aircraft's retirement. On 12 June 2003, AF honoured that agreement, donating Concorde F-BVFA (serial 205) to the museum upon the completion of its last flight. This aircraft was the first AF Concorde to open service to Rio de Janeiro, Washington, D.C., and New York and had flown 17,824 hours. It is on display at the Smithsonian's Steven F. Udvar-Hazy Center at Dulles International Airport.

=== British Airways ===
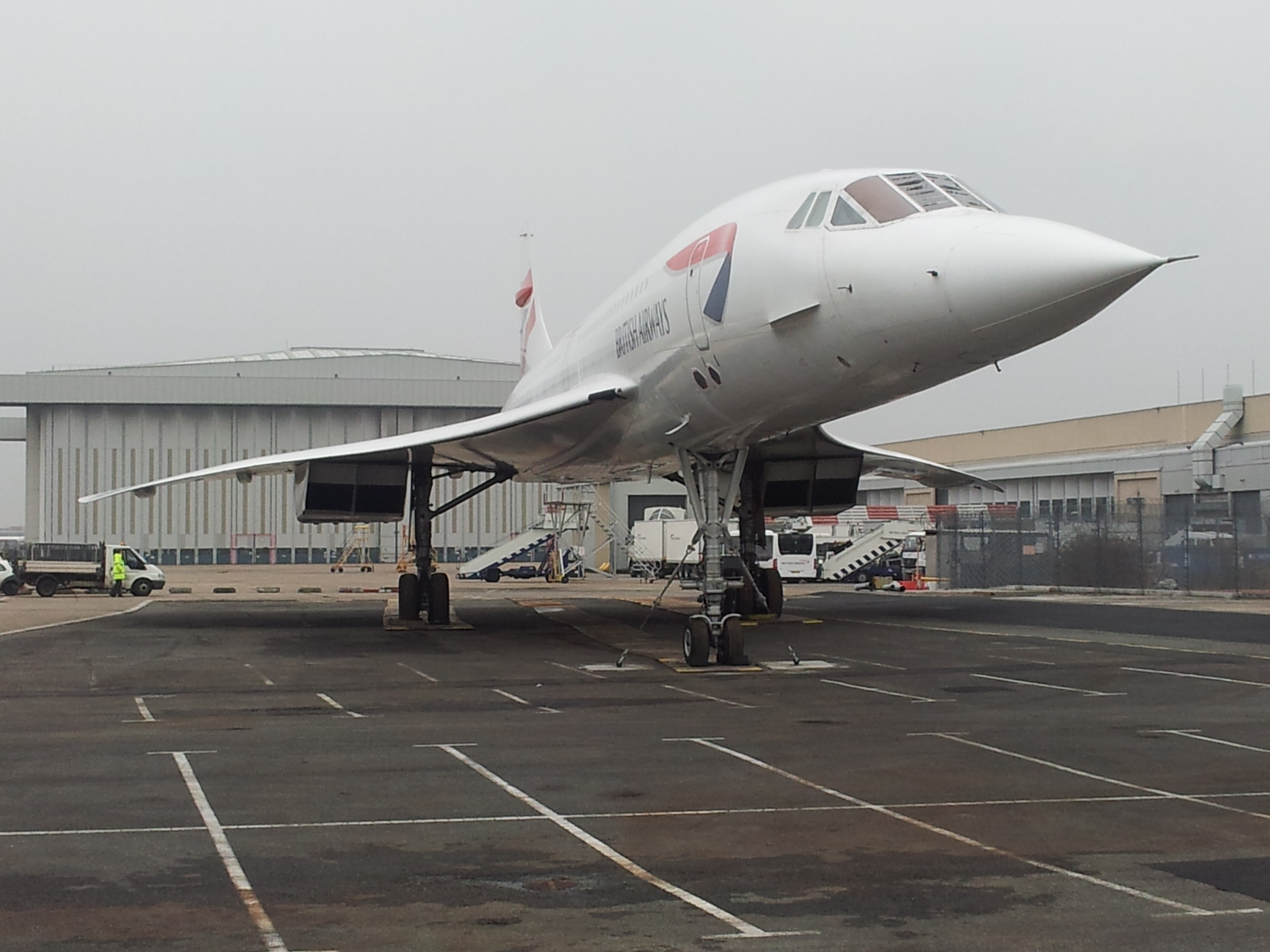
BA Concorde G-BOAB at London Heathrow Airport. This aircraft flew for 22,296 hours between its first flight in 1976 and its final flight in 2000, and has remained there ever since.

British Airways conducted a North American farewell tour in October 2003. G-BOAG visited Toronto Pearson International Airport on 1 October, after which it flew to New York's John F. Kennedy International Airport. G-BOAD visited Boston's Logan International Airport on 8 October, and G-BOAG visited Dulles International Airport on 14 October.

In a week of farewell flights around the United Kingdom, Concorde visited Birmingham on 20 October, Belfast on 21 October, Manchester on 22 October, Cardiff on 23 October, and Edinburgh on 24 October. Each day the aircraft made a return flight out and back into Heathrow to the cities, often overflying them at low altitude. On 22 October, both Concorde flight BA9021C, a special from Manchester, and BA002 from New York landed simultaneously on both of Heathrow's runways. On 23 October 2003, the Queen consented to the illumination of Windsor Castle, an honour reserved for state events and visiting dignitaries, as Concorde's last west-bound commercial flight departed London.

BA retired its Concorde fleet on 24 October 2003. G-BOAG left New York to a fanfare similar to that given for AF's F-BTSD, while two more made round trips, G-BOAF over the Bay of Biscay, carrying VIP guests including former Concorde pilots, and G-BOAE to Edinburgh. The three aircraft then circled over London, having received special permission to fly at low altitude, before landing in sequence at Heathrow. The captain of the New York to London flight was Mike Bannister. The final US Concorde flight occurred on 5 November 2003 when G-BOAG flew from New York's JFK Airport to Seattle's Boeing Field to join the Museum of Flight's permanent collection, piloted by Mike Bannister and Les Broadie, who claimed a flight time of three hours, 55 minutes and 12 seconds, a record between the two cities that was made possible by Canada granting use of a supersonic corridor between Chibougamau, Quebec, and Peace River, Alberta. The museum had been pursuing a Concorde for their collection since 1984. The final Concorde flight worldwide took place on 26 November 2003 with G-BOAF carrying 100 BA cabin crew members and pilots out over the Bay of Biscay and going supersonic over the Atlantic followed by a fly-past over Bristol Filton Airport before landing there in front of a crowd of more than 20,000 people.

BA's Concorde fleet have been grounded, drained of hydraulic fluid and their airworthiness certificates withdrawn. Jock Lowe, ex-chief Concorde pilot and manager of the fleet, estimated in 2004 that it would cost £10–15 million to make G-BOAF airworthy again. BA maintain ownership and have stated that they will not fly again due to a lack of support from Airbus. On 1 December 2003, Bonhams held an auction of British Airways Concorde artefacts, including a nose cone, at Kensington Olympia in London. Proceeds of around £750,000 were raised, with the majority going to charity. G-BOAD is currently on display at the Intrepid Sea, Air & Space Museum in New York. In 2007, BA announced that the advertising spot at Heathrow where a 40% scale model of Concorde was located would not be retained; the model is now on display at the Brooklands Museum, in Surrey.

== See also ==
- List of Concorde aircraft

== Sources ==
- Orlebar, Christopher (2004). The Concorde Story. Oxford, UK: Osprey Publishing. ISBN 978-1-85532-667-5.
