= List of Concorde aircraft =

Concorde
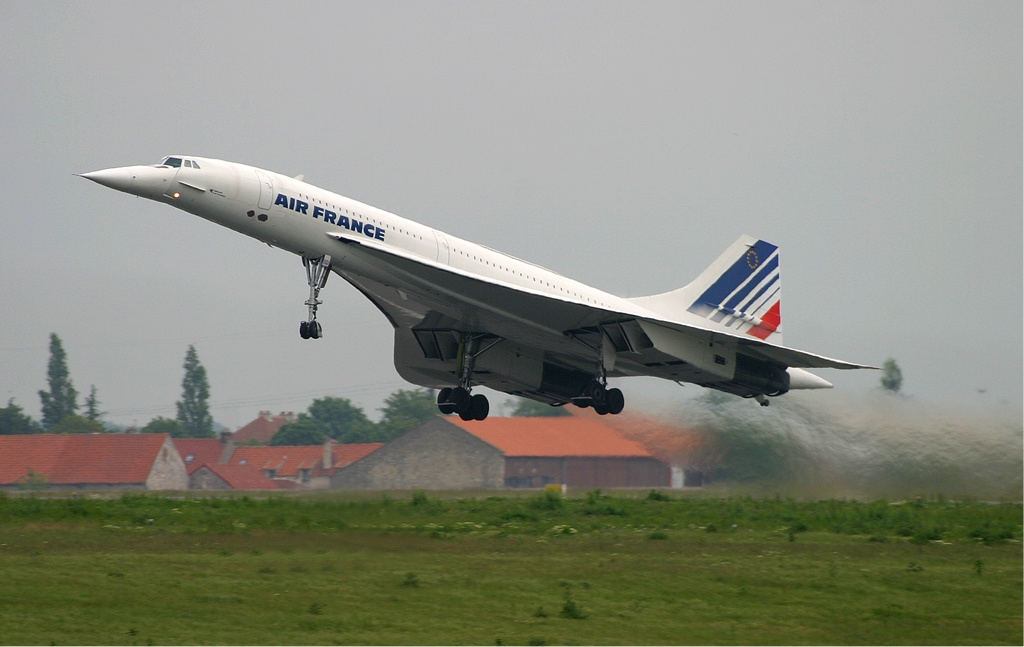
- An Air France Concorde after takeoff in 2003

General information
- Type: Supersonic airliner
- Manufacturer: BAC (now BAE Systems); Sud Aviation (now Airbus)
- Status: Retired
- Primary users: British Airways Air France; See Concorde operational history for others
- Number built: 20 (including 6 non-airline aircraft)

History
- Introduction date: 21 January 1976
- First flight: 2 March 1969
- Retired: 26 November 2003

Twenty Concorde aircraft were built by the British Aircraft Corporation (BAC) and Sud Aviation during its lifetime; six development aircraft flew between 1969 and 1985, and fourteen commercial aircraft between 1975 and 2003. Of the six development aircraft, two were prototypes, two were pre-production, and two were production aircraft; each type of aircraft was split equally in ownership between British Airways and Air France.

All development aircraft are preserved, and only two commercial aircraft are no longer intact; F-BVFD was scrapped in 1994 due to corrosion and financial factors, and F-BTSC was destroyed in the 2000 crash of Air France Flight 4590. Sixteen of these aircraft are on display to the public in museums spanning five countries; G-BOAB is stored at Heathrow Airport in the United Kingdom, and G-BOAE is stored at Grantley Adams International Airport in Barbados.

== Development aircraft ==
=== Prototypes ===
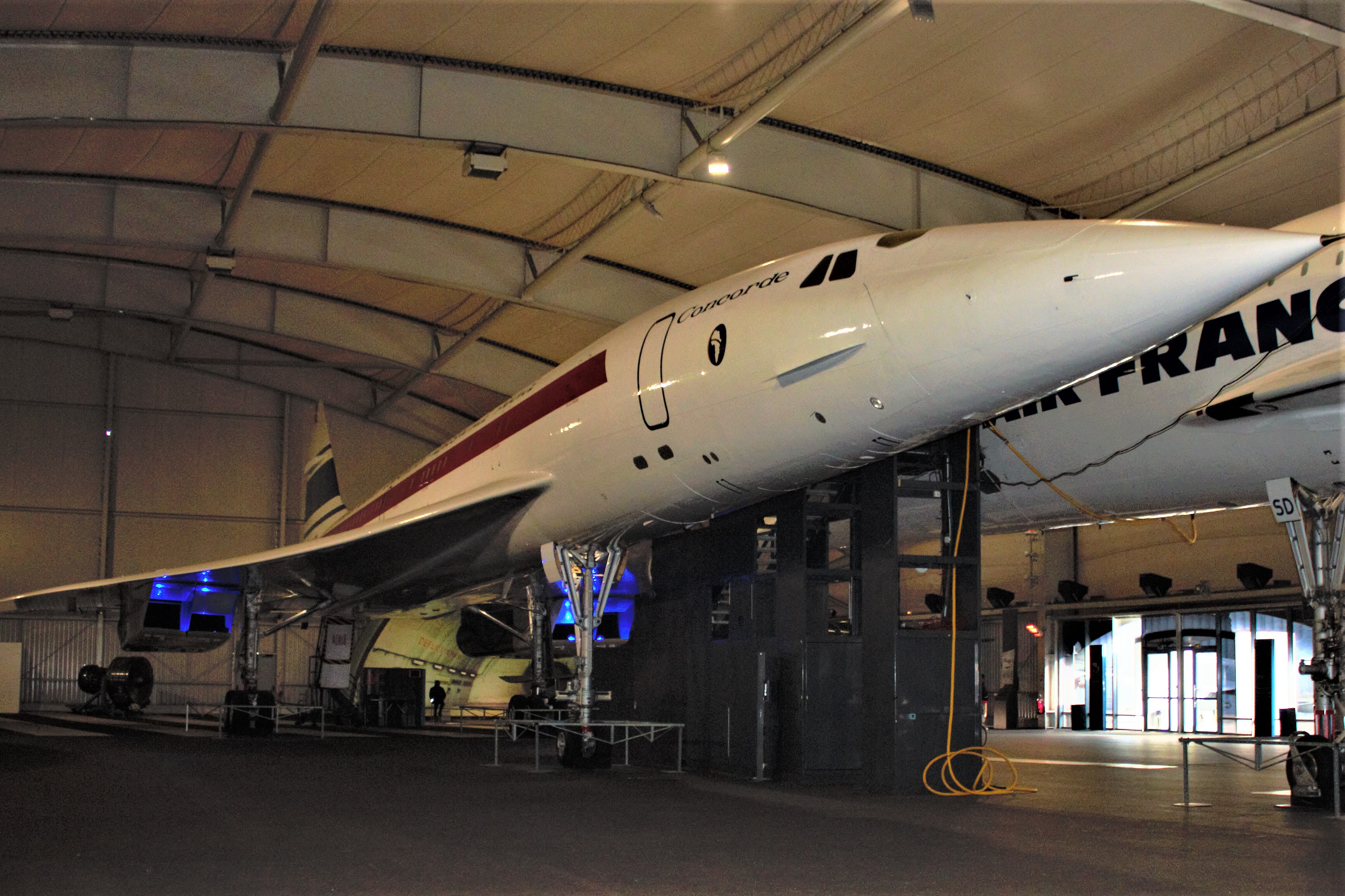
F-WTSS on display at the French air museum in Le Bourget Airport.

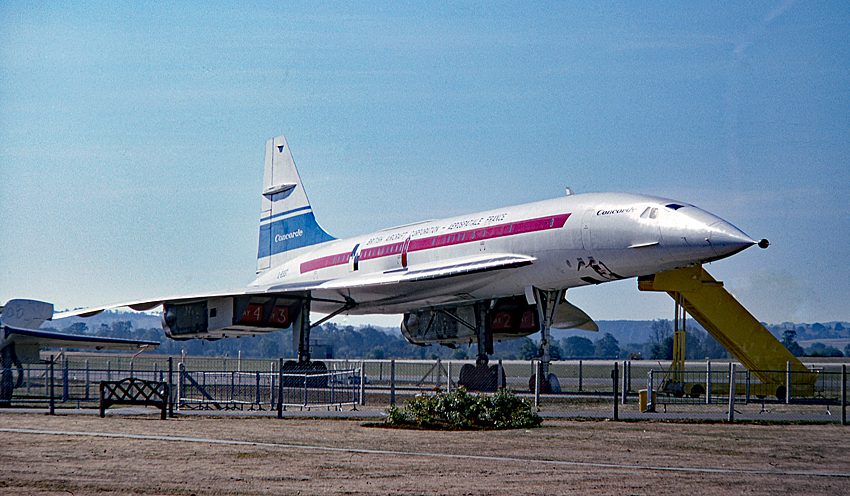
G-BSST at Yeovilton, 1976

Six development aircraft were constructed: two prototypes (001/002), two pre-production (101/102) and two production aircraft (201/202). The two prototype aircraft were used to expand the flight envelope of the aircraft and prove that the design calculations for supersonic flight were correct.

- F-WTSS (production designation 001) was the first Concorde to fly, on 2 March 1969, and was retired on arrival at the Musée de l'air et de l'espace at Le Bourget Airport on 19 October 1973, having made 397 flights covering 812 hours, of which 255 hours were at supersonic speeds. Concorde 001 was modified for the 1973 solar eclipse mission with rooftop portholes and observation equipment. Its flight over Africa became the longest observation of a solar eclipse, lasting some 74 minutes. It remains in its Solar Eclipse mission livery complete with rooftop portholes.
- G-BSST (002) first flew on 9 April 1969 from Filton to RAF Fairford. Its last flight was on 4 March 1976 when it flew to the Fleet Air Arm Museum at the Royal Naval Air Station Yeovilton, England. It had made 438 flights (836 hours), of which 196 flights were supersonic.

=== Pre-production aircraft ===
Both pre-production aircraft were used to further develop the design of the aircraft. Changes to design include different wing planform, more fuel, different engine standard and different air intake systems.

- G-AXDN (101) first flew on 17 December 1971 from Filton and was retired to the Imperial War Museum Duxford, England, where it landed on 20 August 1977, having made 269 flights (632 hours), of which 168 flights were supersonic. It set the record for the fastest speed of any Concorde at Mach 2.23 during a test flight on 26th March 1974
- F-WTSA (102) first flew on 10 January 1973 from Toulouse. It was the fourth aircraft and the first to have the features and the shape of the future production aircraft. It was the first to fly to the United States (on 20 September 1973 to Dallas, Texas). For several years the aircraft was painted in British Airways colours on one side and Air France colours on the other. It made 314 flights (656 hours), of which 189 were supersonic, and was then retired to Orly Airport in Paris on 20 May 1976, where it is on display to the public at Musée Delta.

=== Production aircraft ===
The production aircraft were different in many ways from the original prototypes, necessitating re-examining certain areas to obtain certification.

- F-WTSB (201) first flew on 6 December 1973 from Toulouse. Its last flight was on 19 April 1985 from Chateauroux to Toulouse; a total of 909 flying hours. It is currently inside the Aeroscopia museum near the Airbus factory at Toulouse.
- G-BBDG (202) first flew on 13 December 1974 from Filton to RAF Fairford. It last flew on 24 December 1981 after a total of 1,282 hours. Subsequently, it was stored in a hangar on the Filton Airfield and was used as a spare parts source by British Airways for their Concorde fleet. It was sectioned and moved by road in May/June 2004 to the Brooklands Museum in Weybridge, Surrey, where after restoration it was opened to the public in the summer of 2006.

== Commercial service aircraft ==
=== British commercial service aircraft ===
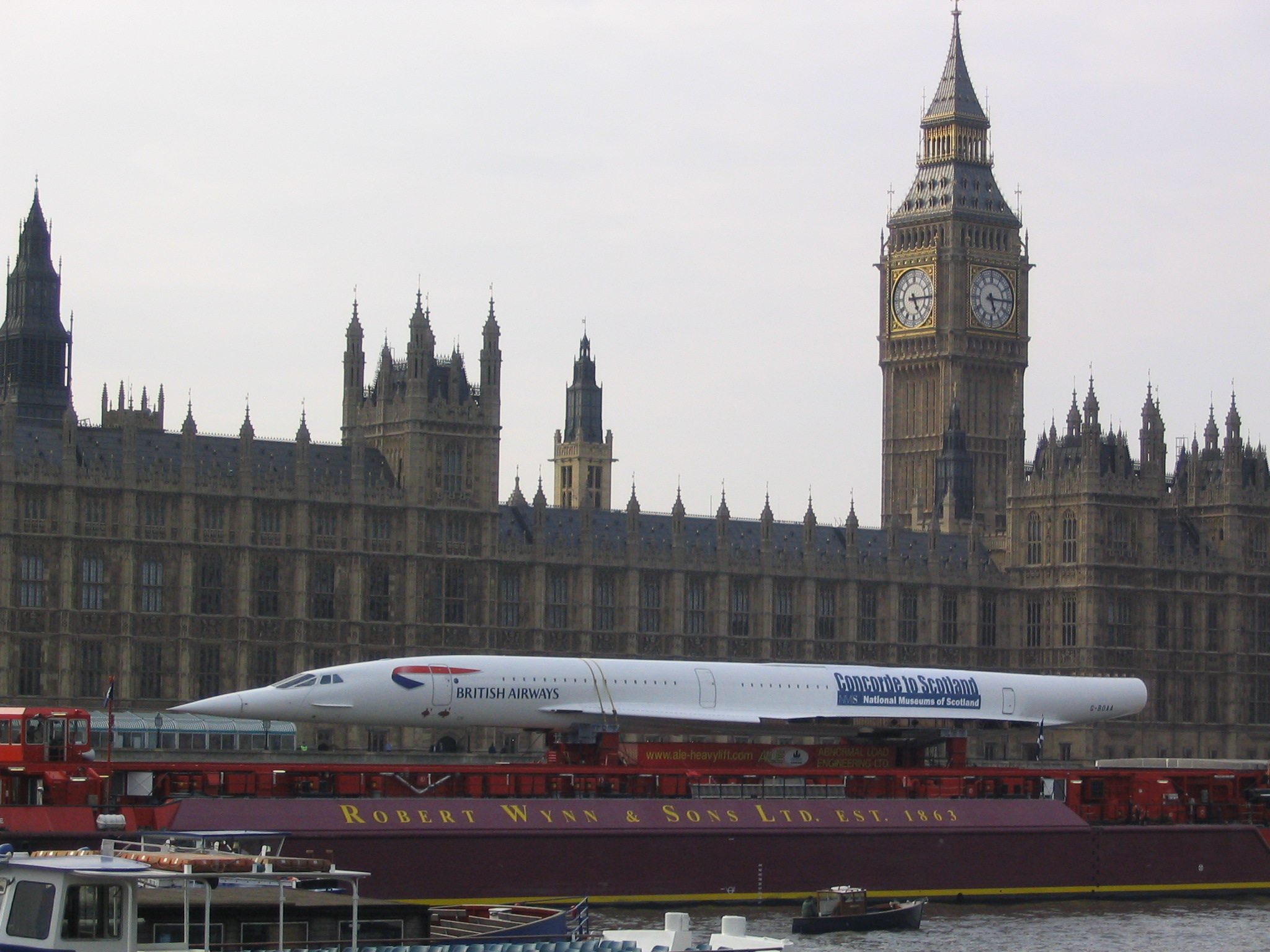
G-BOAA being transported on the River Thames

British Airways had seven production aircraft in commercial service:

- G-BOAC (204) The flagship of the fleet (because of its BOAC registration) first flew on 27 February 1975 from Filton. It made its final revenue flight on 18 October 2003. It made its final flight altogether on 31 October 2003 to Manchester Airport – where a "glass hangar" was later built at the Runway Visitor Park for its display – after flying 22,260 hours.

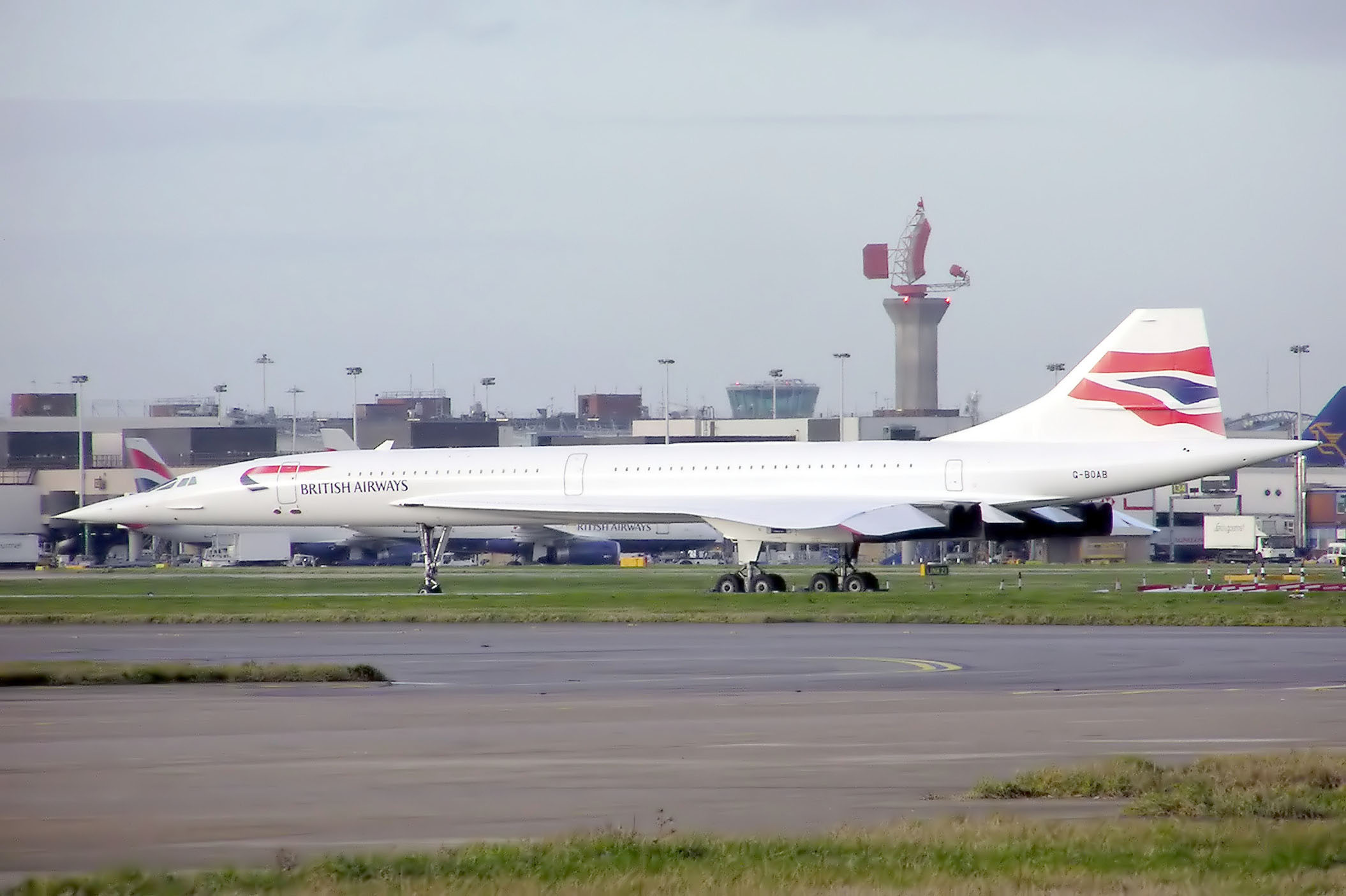
Concorde G-BOAB in storage at London (Heathrow) Airport, following the end of all Concorde flights

- G-BOAA (206) first flew on 5 November 1975 from Filton. This aircraft flew with the Red Arrows on 2 June 1996 to celebrate 50 years of Heathrow Airport. It last flew on 12 August 2000 as BA002 from New York JFK to London Heathrow after flying 22,768 hours, and did not receive modifications after the Paris crash. For its final journey it was transported to the National Museum of Flight (run by National Museums Scotland), East Fortune, near Edinburgh, over land to the Thames, then by sea to Torness, then over land again to the museum from 8 to 19 April 2004.
- G-BOAB (208) first flew on 18 May 1976 from Filton. Its last flight was a positioning flight on 15 August 2000 as BA002P from New York JFK to London Heathrow after flying 22,296 hours. It remains at Heathrow Airport. It was never modified, and so never flew again after returning home following the Paris crash. G-BOAB was used by British Airways to carry out a test installation of the 'Project Rocket' interior that was later installed on the rest of the fleet, before remaining stationary for several years with its interior stripped, with boxes of magazines being used as ballast, and being periodically towed to various locations around the airport. Following minor restoration works in 2015 and 2017, the aircraft is used for apprentice training by BA.

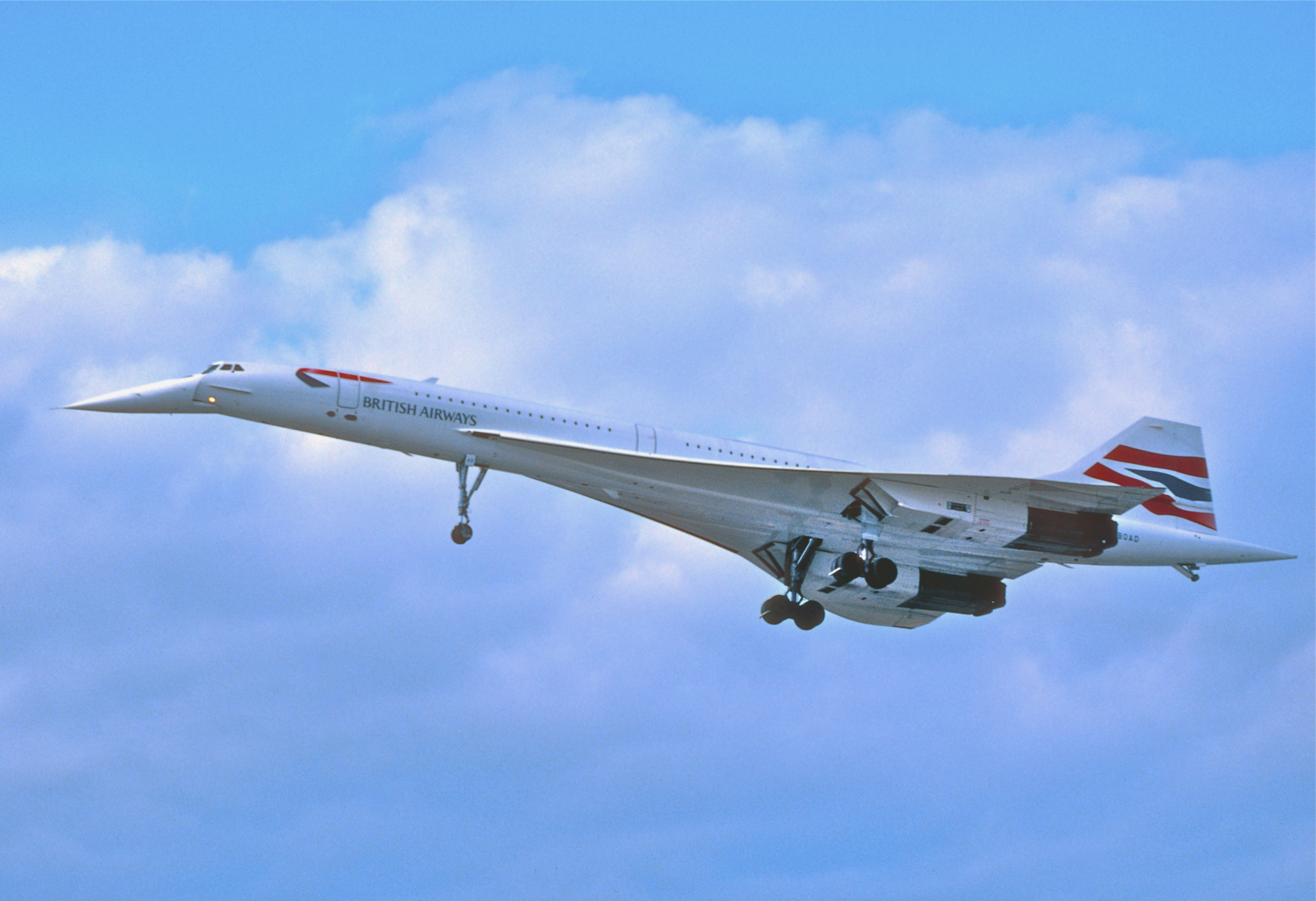
Concorde G-BOAD on 15 May 2003.

- G-BOAD (210) first flew on 25 August 1976 from Filton. It was repainted with Singapore Airlines livery on the left side and British Airways livery on the right for a joint service by the two airlines between Bahrain and Singapore International Airport at Paya Lebar for three months in 1977, and from 1979 to 1981. This aircraft made the fastest Atlantic crossing by any Concorde on 7 February 1996, taking off from New York JFK and landing in London Heathrow 2 hours, 52 minutes, and 59 seconds later. G-BOAD made its last revenue flight on 22 October 2003 from New York to London Heathrow as BA002. It departed from Heathrow for the final time on 10 November 2003 and flew to JFK, from where it was then transferred (on a barge originally used to move Space Shuttle external fuel tanks), to the Intrepid Sea-Air-Space Museum, New York, past the Statue of Liberty and up the Hudson River. Its engines were removed to reduce weight. Its temporary home was on a barge alongside the aircraft carrier Intrepid, pending the proposed creation of a quayside display hall; however, in December 2006, this Concorde was moved to Floyd Bennett Field in Brooklyn, where it was kept in poor conditions.

G-BOAD's nose cone was struck by a truck at the end of June 2008. The damage was repaired and subsequently the aircraft was moved back to Pier 86 in Manhattan (and placed on the pier, rather than on a barge) on 20 October 2008 as part of the Intrepid Sea, Air & Space Museum. On 9 August 2023, G-BOAD was removed from the Intrepid Museum again via boat so that it could be given maintenance and a new paint job. G-BOAD spent more time in the air than any other Concorde, at 23,397 hours.

- G-BOAE (212, nickname Alpha Echo) first flew on 17 March 1977 from Filton. On 1 July 1999 it flew in formation with the Red Arrows to mark the opening of the Scottish Parliament. Its last revenue flight was on 19 October 2003 from New York to London Heathrow as BA002. Its last flight ever was from Heathrow Airport to Grantley Adams International Airport in Bridgetown (Barbados) on 17 November 2003, with 70 members of BA staff on board. The flight, lasting 3 hours and 51 minutes, reached the maximum certified height of 60,000 ft (18,300 m). It flew a total of 23,376 hours. A new exhibition was constructed to house the aircraft, east of the airport at the old Spencers Plantation. The exhibition closed in 2018, as of 2024 the hangar is used as a departure terminal for cruise passengers during the winter season.

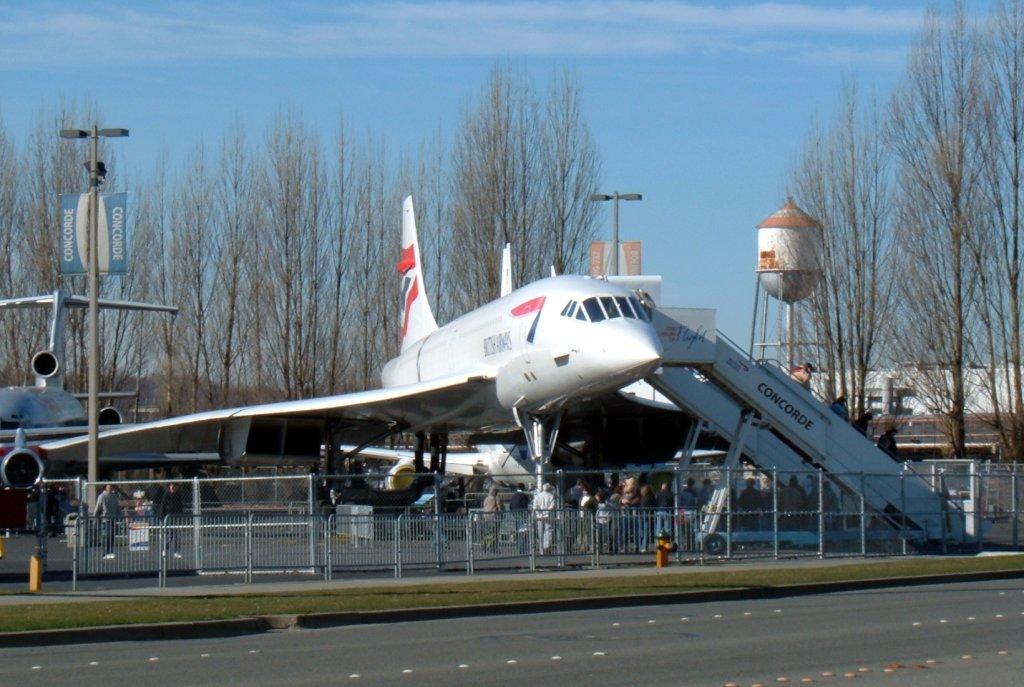
Concorde G-BOAG at the Museum of Flight.

- G-BOAG (214) first flew on 21 April 1978 from Filton. The aircraft flew the final Speedbird 2 service from New York on 24 October 2003, and left Heathrow for the final time on 3 November. It spent a day "resting" and refuelling in New York before making its final flight on 5 November from New York JFK to Boeing Field, Seattle in an unusual supersonic flight, which required special permission, over the sparsely populated part of northern Canada. It is currently displayed at Seattle's Museum of Flight. This Concorde was once used as a source of spares, before being restored using parts from Air France's F-BVFD, and has flown 16,239 hours.
- G-BOAF (216) first flew on 20 April 1979 from Filton and was the final Concorde to be built. G-BOAF was the last Concorde to be retired, its last revenue flight was on 1 October 2003 from New York to London Heathrow as British Airways flight 2. It made a trip looping around London on 24 October 2003 designated as BA9022c, departing from Heathrow Terminal 4 at 14.20 hours for a trip around the Bay of Biscay and arriving back at Heathrow around 16.00 hours along with 2 other Concordes (one from Edinburgh G-BOAE, and the final transatlantic supersonic scheduled service from New York G-BOAG). BA9022c that day carried a number of VIP's such as Tony Benn (who became aviation minister in 1968 and played a major part in keeping the Concorde going when the Treasury wanted to cancel it), Nigel Havers (actor and presenter) and David Gray (singer-songwriter) as well as select group of senior UK Travel Management Industry leaders. G-BOAF's final ever flight was on Wednesday 26 November 2003, departing from Heathrow at 11:30 GMT. It flew a "lap of honour" above Bristol, passing over Portishead, Clevedon, Weston-super-Mare, Bristol Airport and Clifton Suspension Bridge, before landing at Filton, soon after 13:00 GMT to be met by Andrew Mountbatten-Windsor, who formally accepted its handover. It had flown a total of 18,257 hours. Until 2010, the aircraft was open for public viewing at the Airbus facility; since 2017 it has been the main exhibit at Filton's Aerospace Bristol museum. In addition, a nose cone formerly attached to G-BOAF is currently on display in the Concorde Room as of 2021, which is part of the BA first class airport lounge at Heathrow Terminal 5.

As part of tenth-anniversary celebrations on 24 December 1985, British Airways photographed G-BOAA, G-BOAC, G-BOAF and G-BOAG formation flying for their publicity material.

=== French commercial service aircraft ===
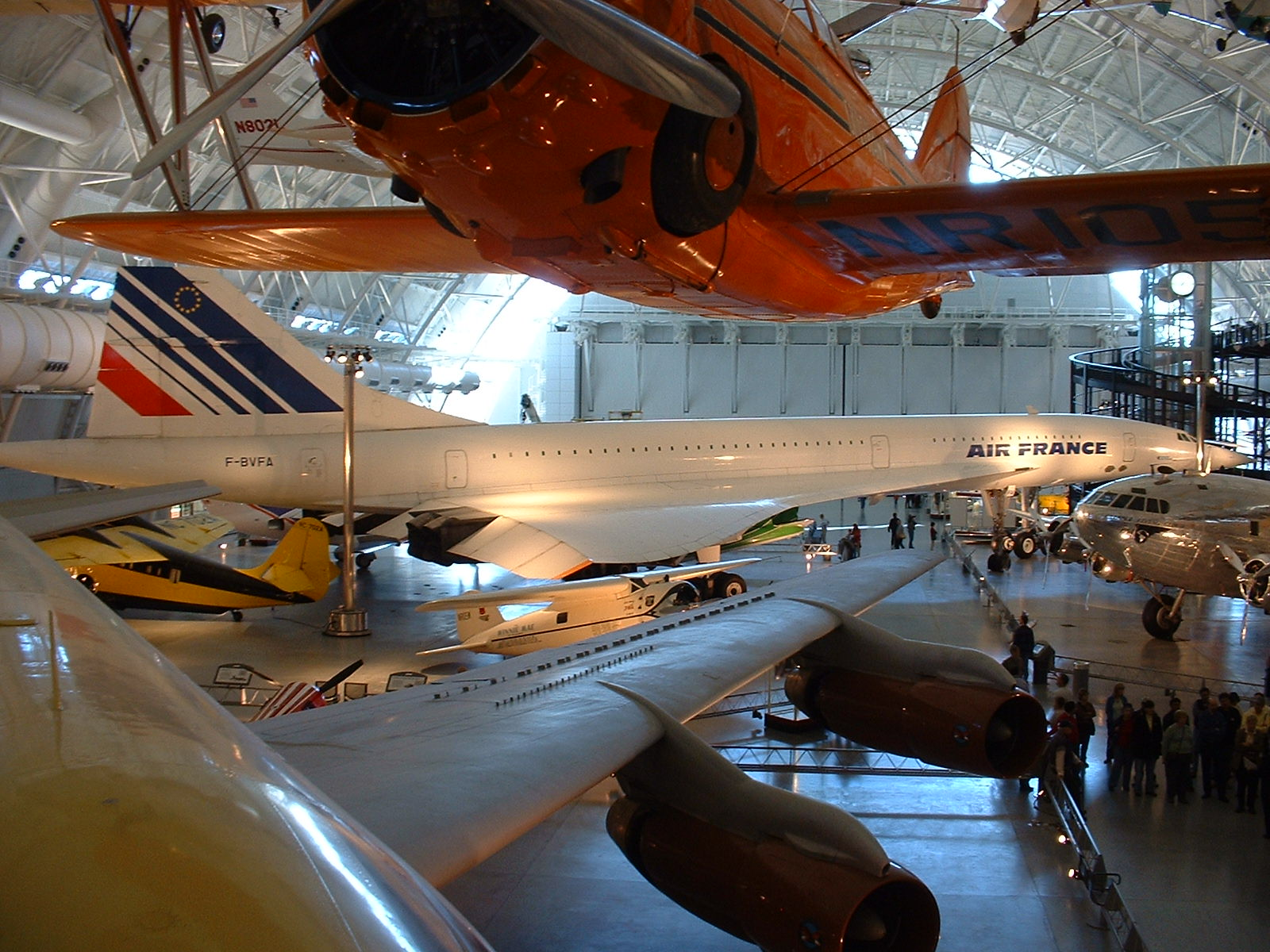
Concorde F-BVFA at Steven F. Udvar-Hazy Center in Virginia, USA

Air France also had seven production aircraft in commercial service:

- F-BTSC (203) was the Concorde lost in the crash of Air France Flight 4590 on 25 July 2000 in the small town of Gonesse, France near Le Bourget, located just outside Paris, killing 113 people. The remains of this aircraft are stored at a hangar at Le Bourget Airport. It is the only Concorde in the history of the design to be destroyed in a crash. It was also featured in the American air disaster film The Concorde... Airport '79, the fourth film of the Airport franchise. It first flew on 31 January 1975 from Toulouse and flew for 11,989 hours.
- F-BVFA (205) first flew on 27 October 1975 from Toulouse. In 1988 it flew around the world in a record-breaking 41 hours 27 minutes. It made its final revenue flight on 31 May 2003, the last day of revenue service for Air France's Concorde fleet. It made its final flight altogether to the Smithsonian Institution National Air and Space Museum's new Steven F. Udvar-Hazy Center at Washington Dulles International Airport (USA) on 12 June 2003 after flying 17,824 hours.

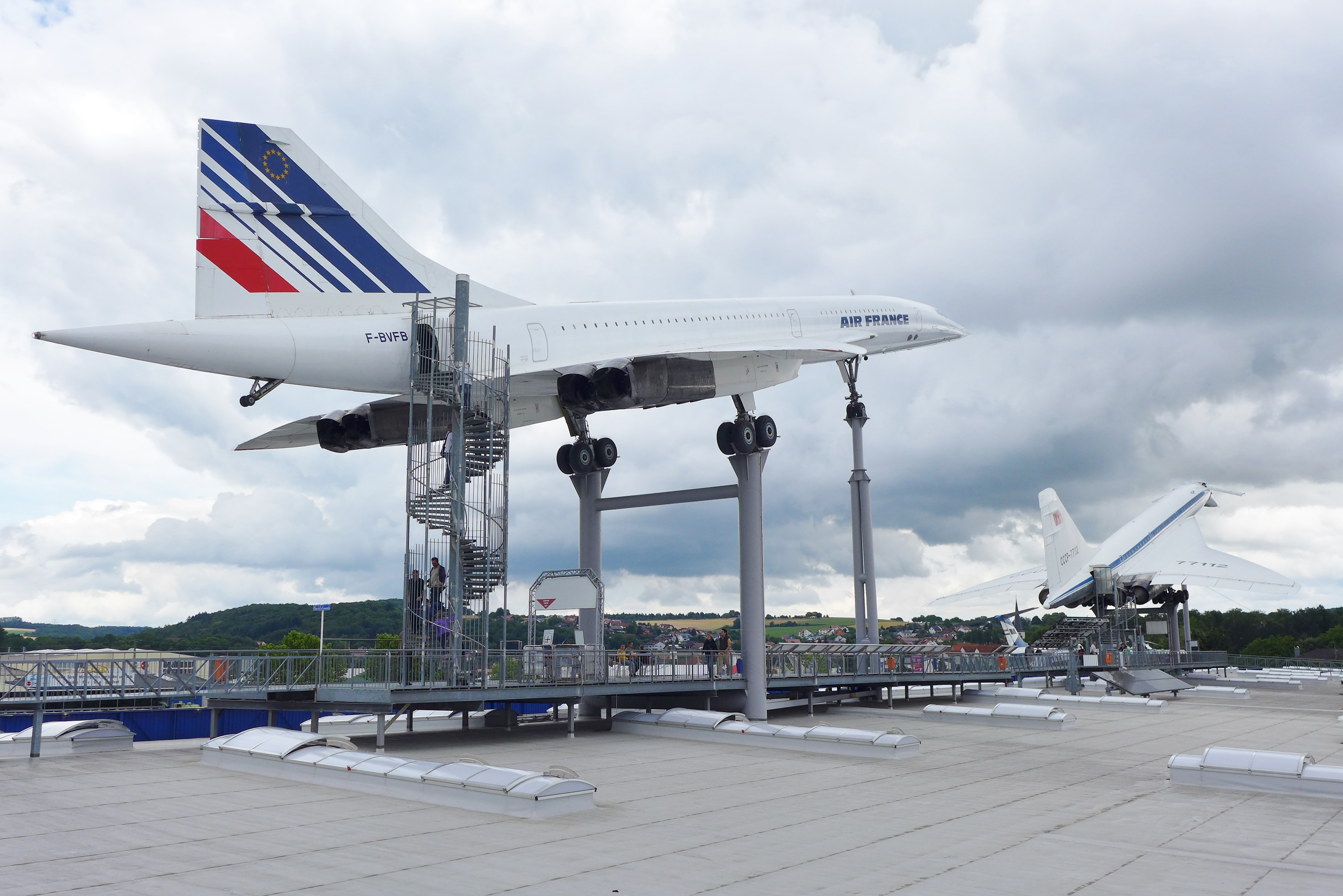
Concorde F-BVFB and Tupolev Tu-144 at Sinsheim Technik Museum, Germany

- F-BVFB (207) first flew on 6 March 1976 from Toulouse. It made its final revenue flight on 31 May 2003, the last day of revenue service for Air France's Concorde fleet. It was sold for €1 to the Sinsheim Auto & Technik Museum in Germany. It flew to Karlsruhe–Baden-Baden Airpark, in south west Germany on 24 June 2003 for its final flight altogether. After removal of its wings and tail fin, it traveled by barge and road, to join a Tupolev Tu-144 already exhibited at Sinsheim. It had flown 14,771 hours. This is the only instance of both supersonic passenger aircraft on display together.
- F-BVFC (209) first flew on 9 July 1976 from Toulouse. It made its final flight on 27 June 2003 as Air France flight 6903 and was retired to the Airbus plant at Toulouse, where the French aircraft were constructed, joining 201. It was the final Air France Concorde to be retired but its last revenue flight was on 30 May 2003 from New York to Paris as Air France flight 1, 1 day before the last day of revenue service of Air France's Concordes. The final flight was supersonic, and included a go around at Toulouse. It had flown 14,332 hours. It has been on display outside the Aeroscopia museum since January 2015.
- F-BVFD (211) first flew on 10 February 1977 from Toulouse. It was retired early, on 27 May 1982, having flown only 5,814 hours. Air France had a surplus of aircraft after discontinuing its Concorde flights to Washington, D.C., Mexico City, Rio de Janeiro and Caracas, and the company decided to retire one aircraft from its fleet to be used as a source of spare parts. F-BVFD was selected because its airframe had been damaged after experiencing a hard landing in Dakar in November 1977. Badly corroded after being stored outdoors, it was broken up in 1994 at Charles de Gaulle Airport in Paris. It was the only Concorde scrapped. A small section of the fuselage remains at Le Bourget, France and the nose cone was sold to an American collector.
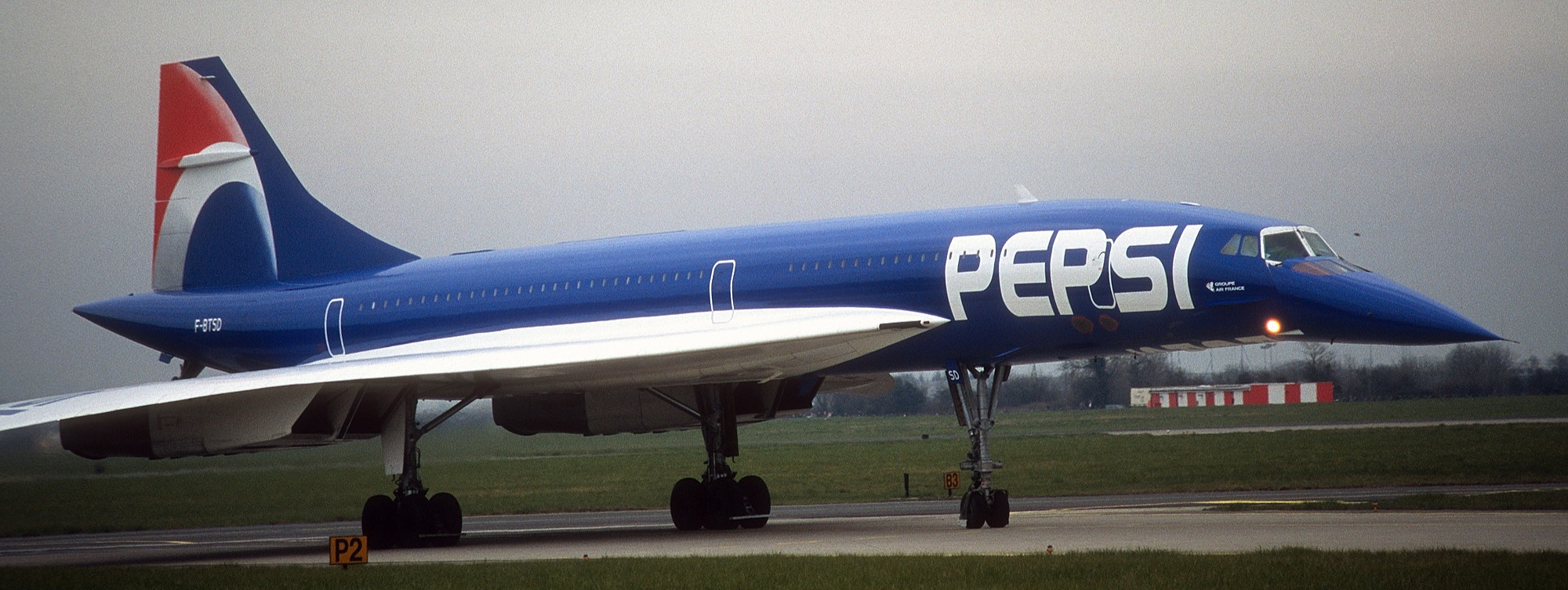
  F-BTSD in its Pepsi livery at Dublin Airport in 1996
- F-BTSD (213) first flew on 26 June 1978 from Toulouse. It made its final revenue flight on 31 May 2003, the last day of revenue service for Air France's Concorde fleet. It was retired to the Musée de l'Air et de l'Espace (Air and Space Museum) at Le Bourget, France, on 14 June 2003, joining 001 after flying 12,974 hours. In 1996, this aircraft carried a promotional paint scheme (blue with logo) for Pepsi. The wings were kept white, and while in the Pepsi livery, it was restricted to flying at most 20 minutes at Mach 2.02 and otherwise Mach 1.7 (the plane normally requires a white livery to fly supersonic because of the heat); the branding was estimated to have cost Pepsi $20 million. It flew 16 flights around the Middle East in this livery. The plane also holds the world record for flying around the world in both directions: westbound in 32 hours 49 minutes and 3 seconds on 12/13 October 1992, and eastbound in 31 hours 27 minutes and 49 seconds on 15/16 August 1995. It also was the only Concorde to land in Central America, setting a new time record between Juan Santamaría International Airport and John F. Kennedy International Airport.

In February 2010, it was announced that the museum and a group of volunteer AF technicians intended to restore F-BTSD so it could taxi under its own power. In May 2010, it was reported that the British Save Concorde Group and French Olympus 593 groups had begun inspecting the engines of a Concorde at the French museum; their intent was to restore the airliner to a condition where it could fly in demonstrations.

- F-BVFF (215) first flew on 26 December 1978 from Toulouse. It was undergoing D-check maintenance at the Air France maintenance hangar at Charles de Gaulle at the time of the 25 July 2000 crash which temporarily grounded all Concordes. After the withdrawal of the type was announced midway through refurbishment, it was cosmetically reassembled on the outside (outer shell only, no interior) and used as a display piece following the retirement of all Concordes. It last flew on a charter flight to Paris Charles de Gaulle on 11 June 2000 after flying 12,421 hours.

== List of aircraft ==
Of the 20 aircraft built, 18 remain, with 16 on display to the public. (Note: G-BOAB is at London Heathrow Airport and sits adjacent to a taxiway. It is visible from numerous areas inside and outside the airport, but is inaccessible to the public. G-BOAE is in the Concorde Terminal at the Grantley Adams Airport in Barbados, originally a museum but repurposed into a back up departures terminal.)

Identity		Photograph	Tenure				Fate		
Number	Registration	Photograph	First flight	Last revenue flight	Last flight	Flying hours	Status	Location	Displayed livery
001	F-WTSS		2 March 1969	— (Note: Aircraft did not fly in revenue service)	19 October 1973	812	On display	Musée de l'air et de l'espace (Le Bourget, France)	Air France
002	G-BSST		9 April 1969	—	4 March 1976	836	On display	Fleet Air Arm Museum (Yeovilton, United Kingdom)	British Aircraft Corporation
101	G-AXDN		17 December 1971	—	20 August 1977	632	On display	Imperial War Museum (Duxford, United Kingdom)	British Aircraft Corporation
102	F-WTSA		10 January 1973	—	20 May 1976	656	On display	Musée Delta (Paris, France)	Air France
201	F-WTSB		6 December 1973	—	19 April 1985	909	On display	Aeroscopia (Toulouse, France)	Air France
202	G-BBDG		13 February 1974	—	24 December 1981	1282	On display	Brooklands Museum (Weybridge, United Kingdom)	British Airways
203	F-BTSC (Note: Test flown as F-WTSC)		31 January 1975	25 July 2000	25 July 2000	11989	Destroyed in an air crash on 25 July 2000.	Wreckage stored in a hangar at Le Bourget Airport (France)	
204	G-BOAC (Note: Used G-N81AC and N81AC during Braniff lease period)		27 February 1975	18 October 2003	31 October 2003	22260	On display	Manchester Airport, (Manchester, United Kingdom)	British Airways
205	F-BVFA (Note: Used N94FA during Braniff lease period)		27 October 1975	31 May 2003	12 June 2003	17824	On display	Steven F. Udvar-Hazy Center (Chantilly, United States)	Air France
206	G-BOAA (Note: Used G-N94AA and N94AA during Braniff lease period)		5 November 1975	12 August 2000	12 August 2000	22768	On display	National Museum of Flight (East Lothian, United Kingdom)	British Airways
207	F-BVFB (Note: Used N94FB during Braniff lease period)		6 March 1976	31 May 2003	24 June 2003	14771	On display	Technik Museum Sinsheim (Sinsheim, Germany)	Air France
208	G-BOAB (Note: Used G-N94AB and N94AB during Braniff lease period)		18 May 1976	15 August 2000	15 August 2000	22296	In storage (can be seen from afar)	Heathrow Airport (London, United Kingdom)	British Airways
209	F-BVFC (Note: Used N94FC during Braniff lease period)		9 July 1976	30 May 2003	27 June 2003	14332	On display	Aeroscopia Museum (Toulouse, France)	Air France
210	G-BOAD (Note: Used G-N94AD and N94AD during Braniff lease period)		25 August 1976	22 October 2003	10 November 2003	23397	On display	Intrepid Museum (New York City, United States)	British Airways
211	F-BVFD (Note: Used N94FD during Braniff lease period)		10 February 1977	27 May 1982	27 May 1982	5814	Scrapped in 1994	A small section of the fuselage remains at Le Bourget, France and the nose cone was sold to an American collector.	
212	G-BOAE (Note: Used G-N94AE and N94AE during Braniff lease period)		17 March 1977	19 October 2003	17 November 2003	23376	On display	Grantley Adams International Airport (Christ Church, Barbados)	British Airways
213	F-BTSD (Note: Test flown as F-WJAM; used N94SD during Braniff lease period)		26 June 1978	31 May 2003	14 June 2003	12974	On display	Musée de l'air et de l'espace (Le Bourget, France)	Air France
214	G-BOAG (Note: Originally registered G-BFKW)		21 April 1978	24 October 2003	5 November 2003	16239	On display	Museum of Flight, (Seattle, United States)	British Airways
215	F-BVFF (Note: Test flown as F-WJAN)		26 December 1978	?	11 June 2000	12421	On display	Charles de Gaulle Airport (Paris, France)	Air France
216	G-BOAF (Note: Originally registered G-BFKX; used G-N94AF and N94AF during Braniff lease period)		20 April 1979	1 October 2003	26 November 2003	18257	On display	Aerospace Bristol (Bristol, United Kingdom)	British Airways

=== Map of current Concorde displays ===
Map
