= Oil boom =

Large inflow of income from high production or prices of oil

An oil boom is a period of large inflow of income as a result of high global oil prices or large oil production in an economy. Generally, this short period initially brings economic benefits, in terms of increased GDP growth, but might later lead to a resource curse.

== History ==
Some important oil booms around the world include:

- Pennsylvanian oil rush (United States, 1859)
- Texas oil boom (United States, early 1900s–1940s)
- Calgary oil boom (Canada, 1947)
- Mexican oil boom (Mexico, 1977–1981)
- Nigerian oil boom (Nigeria, 1970s)
- North Dakota oil boom (United States, 2008–2015)

== Consequences ==
According to the Dutch disease theory, the sudden discovery of oil may cause a decline in the manufacturing sector. The consequences will vary from country to country, depending on the country's economic structure and stage of development. For example, after the oil boom in Gabon, the country showed symptoms of the Dutch disease, while oil-producing Equatorial Guinea did not.

== See also ==
- Energy crisis
- 1970s energy crisis
  - 1973 energy crisis
  - 1979 energy crisis
  - 1980s oil glut
