= Aeroscopia =

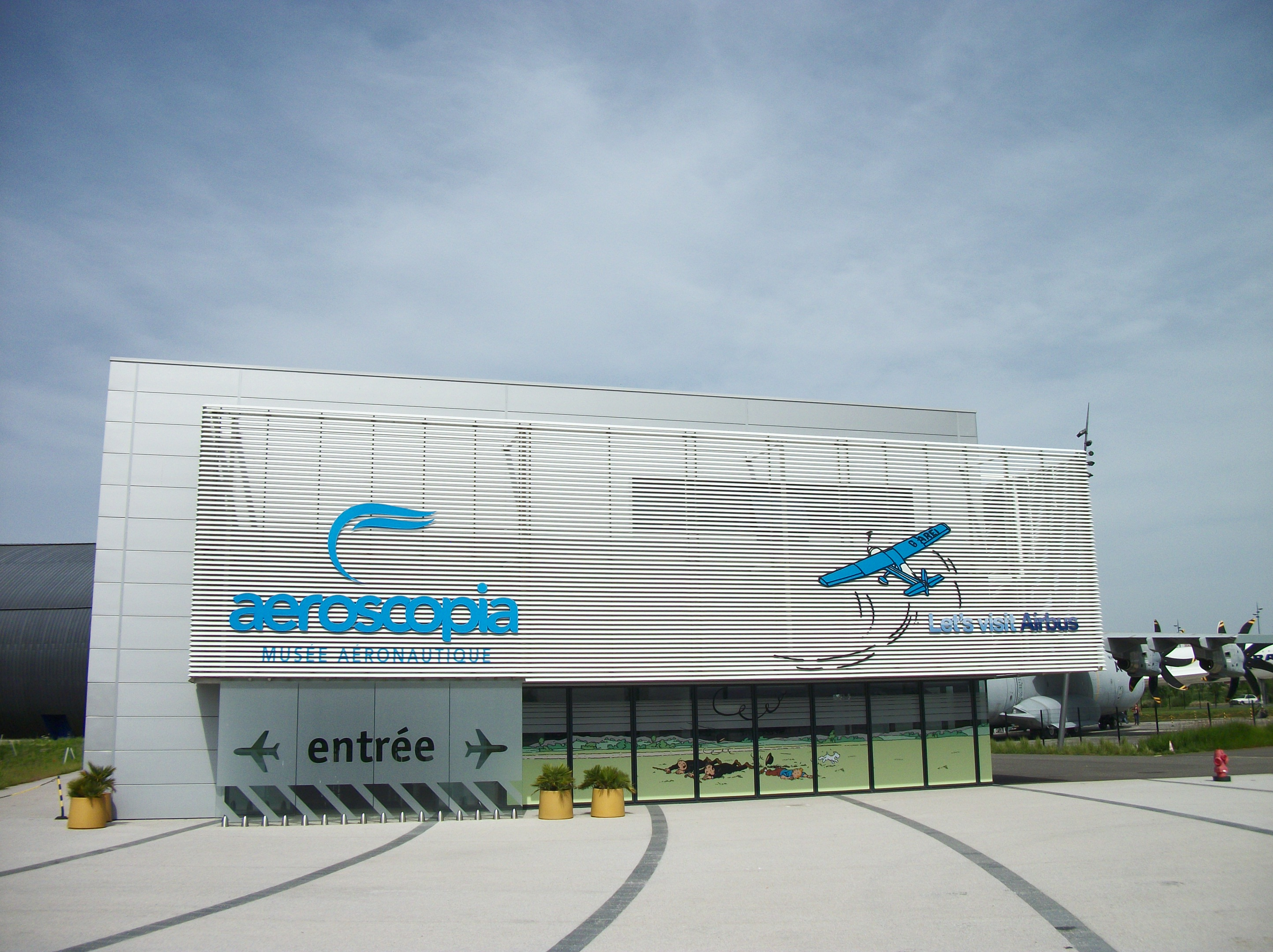
- Established: 2015
- Location: Blagnac, France
- Coordinates: 43°39′36.814″N 1°21′38.005″E
- Type: Aviation museum
- Visitors: 218,000 (2015)
- Director: Guillaume Manet
- Website: musee-aeroscopia.fr

Aeroscopia is a French aerospace museum, located at the north-western edge of Toulouse, in the commune of Blagnac. It was opened on 14 January 2015.

This museum notably hosts two Concorde airliners.

== Building ==
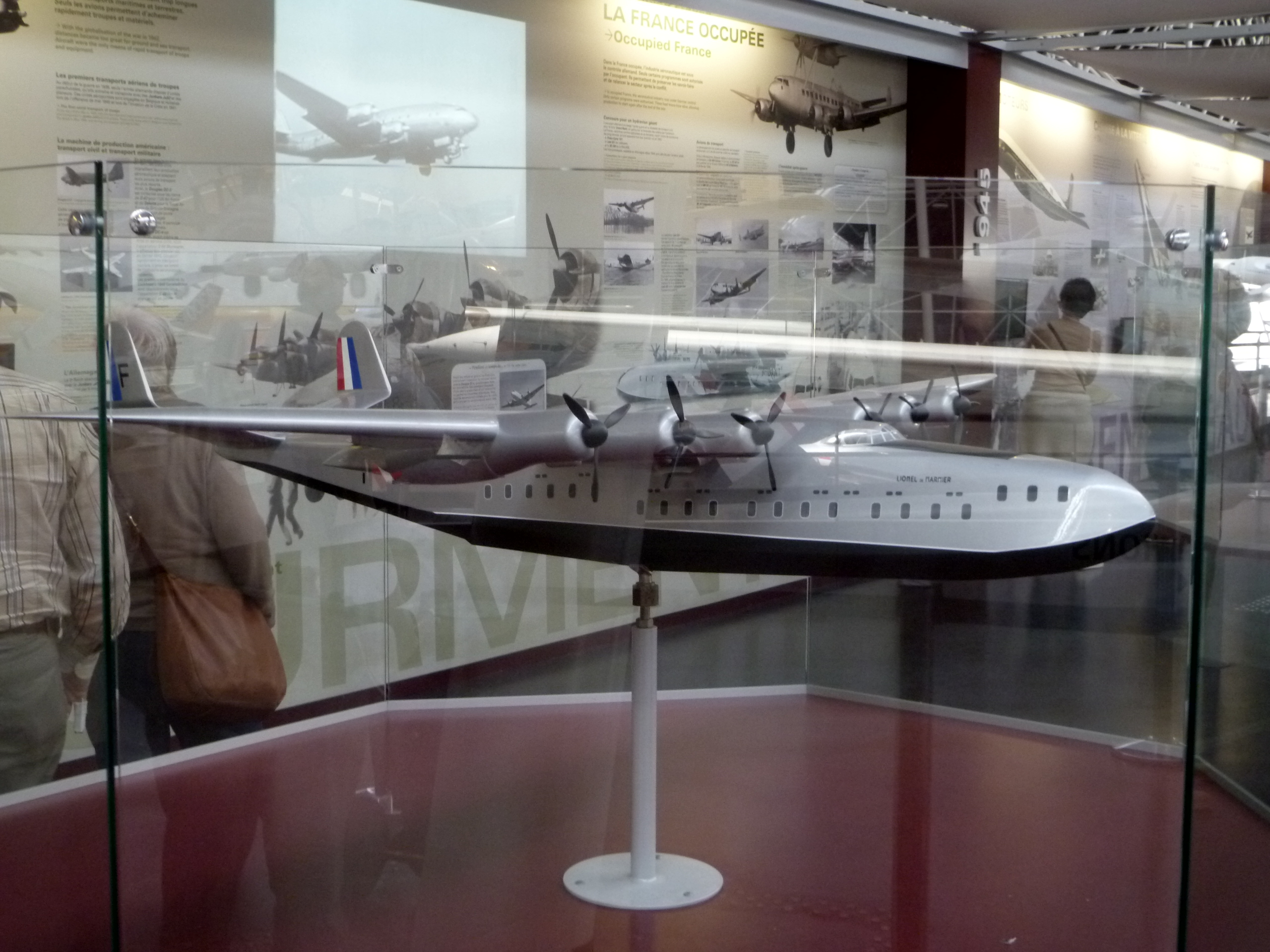
Model of Latécoère 631 at Aeroscopia, Toulouse

Designed by the firm Cardete and Huet Architectes, the hall housing the planes has an ovoid section and forms an arc of a circle around a body of water, and is extended by an uncovered surface of 5,000 m^{2} allowing the exhibition of other devices. It is connected by a corridor to the Showroom, a 1,000 m^{2} rectangular building. This houses the reception, the shop as well as the "Telemetry room" which introduces the visit of the Airbus factories. The hall was designed as a response to the A380 assembly lines it faces, so its rounded lines and black color contrast with the rectilinear shape and mirror effect of the factory doors.

The exhibition hall is 100 m long, 72 m wide and 23 m high, for an area of 8,000 m^{2}. The metal frame consists of a three-dimensional steel tube trellis weighing 300 t manufactured by the Spanish group Lanik. The cover is provided by zinc sheets crimped together. Its structure has been planned to receive a possible extension when funding allows it.

At the end of 2018, the construction site for an extension was launched by the Town Hall of Blagnac: a new tarmac was created on the site representing an area of approximately 2 hectares and a new building making it possible to visit one of the aircraft hosted on this tarmac, the A380-800. The Tarmac Nord project was designed and built by the Détours de Routes design office for the roads and tarmac section and by the Pierrard Architecte agency for the architecture of the new building.

This building, of modest dimensions (20 m long, 12 m wide, 12 m high) was created in such a way as to contrast sharply with the A380: the rectilinear walls in prefabricated concrete panels and stained in black color contrast with the curves and the white color of the aircraft, both of which naturally stand out. Glazed walkways allow access to the two decks of the A380, while offering a view from above on the North tarmac and in particular the aircraft of the Airbus family, A320, A340 and A380.

The North tarmac, the new building and the visit of the A380 have been open to the public since March 14, 2020, i.e. 3 days before the first confinement linked to the COVID-19 pandemic.

== See also ==
- List of aerospace museums
