= BAC Concorde G-BBDG =

First British production test supersonic airliner

Coordinates: 51°21′19″N 0°27′51″W

G-BBDG
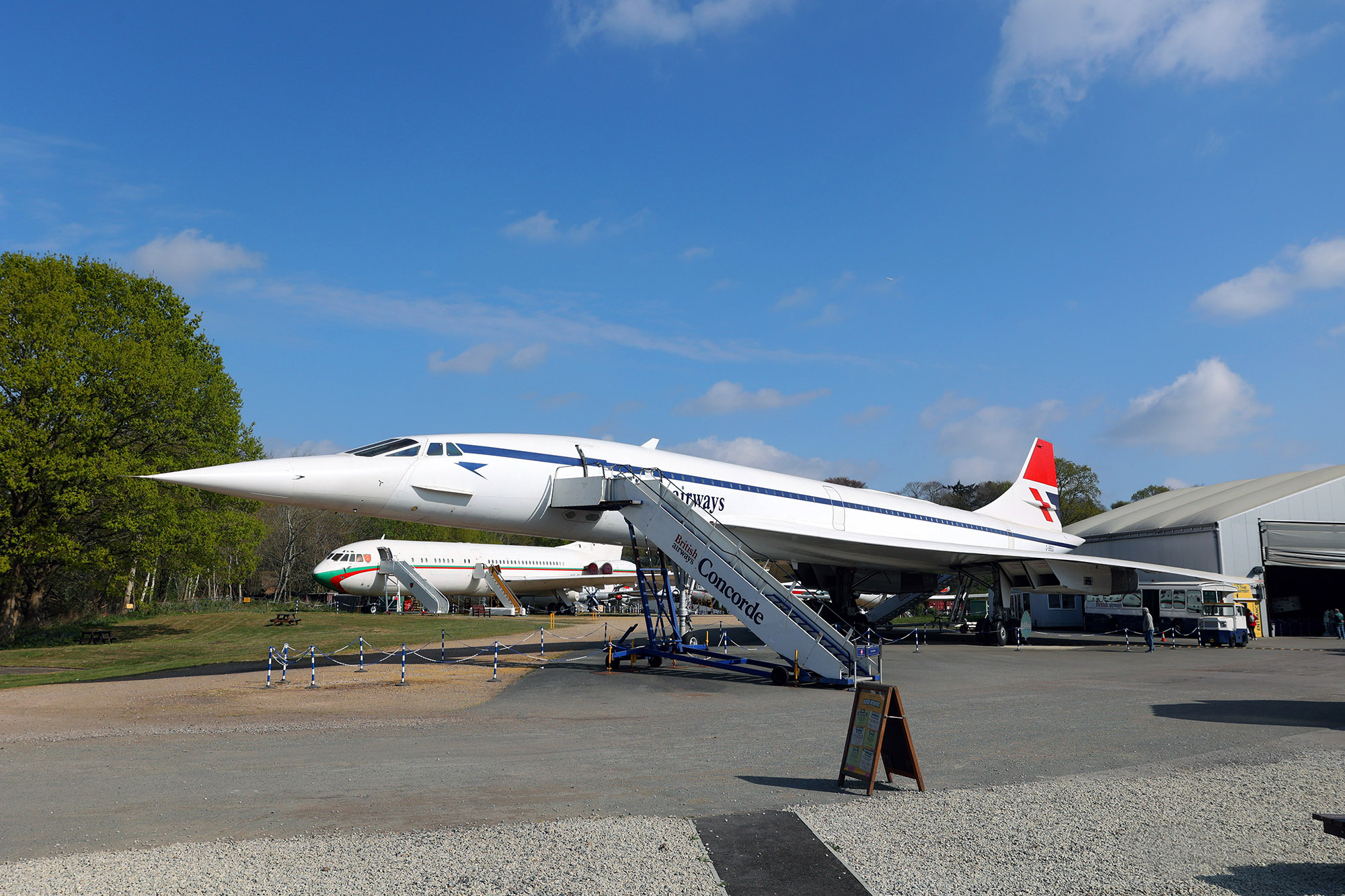
- Concorde G-BBDG on display at Brooklands Museum in April 2025

General information
- Other name: Delta Golf
- Type: Concorde
- Manufacturer: British Aircraft Corporation
- Owners: BAC and British Airways
- Construction number: 202
- Registration: G-BBDG
- Total hours: 1282 hrs 9 mins

History
- First flight: 13 February 1974
- Last flight: 24 December 1981
- Preserved at: Brooklands Museum

G-BBDG, known as "Delta Golf", is the British development Concorde built for evaluation testing. Along with the French Concorde F-WTSB, the aircraft was used to enable sufficient testing to allow for the Concorde fleet to receive certification. On retirement the aircraft was stored at Filton airfield from the mid-1980s until 2003, when she was transported by road to the Brooklands Museum in Weybridge, Surrey.

== History ==
G-BBDG first flew on 13 February 1974, having been registered on 7 August 1973. Delta Golf's main uses were finalising the Concorde design and certification prior to Concorde entering passenger service.

There were some differences between this aircraft and the final production aircraft, such as a thinner fuselage skin. The aircraft was painted in British Airways livery throughout the testing period.

The final flight of Delta Golf was on 24 December 1981, the aircraft had flown a total of 1282 hrs 9 mins.

After the final flight, Delta Golf was stored at Filton in a state of semi-airworthiness throughout 1982 where it could be returned to flight in two weeks if required. However this was never required, and the aircraft was eventually bought by British Airways as part of a Concorde support buy-out in 1984.

The aircraft never entered commercial service with British Airways; instead, it was used as a major source of spare parts, allowing the airline to operate a fleet of seven aircraft. A hangar was constructed for her at Filton airfield in the late 1980s; the tail was removed prior to the aircraft being placed in storage.

In 1995, Concorde G-BOAF had its nose damaged in a handling accident at Heathrow Airport. British Airways swapped this nose with that of G-BBDG. As well as the nose and tail, other parts were removed, including the engines, landing gear and most of the hydraulics system. The original nose was later repaired at Brooklands and returned to G-BBDG.

The aircraft was considered for scrapping many times, but was always found to be useful, and was used for a number of additional tests on the ground during her stay at Filton. In 2001, Delta Golf was used to test reinforced cockpit doors required for all aircraft after the September 11 attacks.

When British Airways and Air France retired their fleets in 2003, Brooklands Museum at Weybridge in Surrey accepted the aircraft as a museum exhibit. It was dismantled into five major sections and transported by road to Brooklands Museum. The task of structurally disassembling and reassembling the aircraft was carried out by Air Salvage International (ASI). Delta Golf was then restored by a team of over 100 museum volunteers who included staff and students from the University of Surrey.

The Concorde Experience was opened at the museum in July 2006 by Prince Michael of Kent; it allows visitors to enter the aircraft and experience a virtual flight at speeds up to Mach 2.

== See also ==
- Concorde aircraft histories
