= Mexican oil boom =

Oil boom in Mexico from 1977 to 1981

The Mexican Oil Boom was an oil boom from 1977 to 1981 which eventually led to a disastrous crash that lasted for most of the 1980s, driving the economy to a payment default and a significant deficit correction as oil prices fell.

== Pre-Boom period ==
Since 1954 and until 1971 the Mexican economy performed very consistently, averanging 6% GDP growth each year and 3% inflation rate, allowing the country to sustain an exchange rate of 12.50 pesos per US dollar for 22 years (1954-1976). This period, called the "Mexican Economic Miracle" and "Stabilizing Development", consisted in an ISI model. By the late 1970s the economy faced certain limitations in the economic model, at the same time the United States were troubled with a rising trade deficit, sparking an international financial period of uncertainty. Mexico opted out to put more public money and investment to sustain fast growth. This was fuelling inflation as government spending was fully financed with new printed money. A devaluation in 1976 caused some panic until Petróleos Mexicanos (PEMEX) discovered the Cantarell Field that year, boosting perspectives to exploit the soaring oil prices and the government decided to invest and change the economic model.

== Oil Boom era ==
Between 1977 and 1981 PEMEX oil production grew almost twofold from 1.086 million bbd to 2.313 million bbd*, and net exports 5-fold from 0.197 million bbd to 1.154 million bbd*, this led to a 4-year 9.1% average growth in the GDP, and even as inflation crept up higher from a high base above 20% yearly, the massive job creation and rapid wage pace kept the workers mood calm.

The expansion was mostly financed by loans and foreign money, as cheap credits from private banks and a blind faith from financiers allowed big sums of money to be invested easily, at the same time a free spending public sector began to invest in nearly anything within the nation. This money was trickling down to the broader economy and the private sector, the most benefited sectors were Construction, Mining and Transport, whose companies depending on private consumer also where in the free spending party, as result consumer goods imports soared 4.4 times* in 1981 from their 1977 level.

== Oil price drop and consequences ==
When the world economy was hard hit by the interest rates hike from Paul Volcker in 1982 to stop inflation in the United States, those highly indebted nations like Mexico, which invested heavily to develop its field, were in crisis. Interest rates went up dramatically at the same time oil demand and prices eased. The result was a gap of nearly 9% of the GDP in the national budget of 1982, turning Mexico in to default on their interest payments and finally signing up the commitments of the IMF, those financial commitments the government rejected back in 1976 when the fields were discovered.

The effects of the budget cuts impacted the economy across the board, as the sale and privatization of the assets in the economy and job cuts pushed thousands of people out of work, government payroll shrank, and the ongoing restructuring of the private and public economy to face the new realities derived a series of reforms, aiming a growth dependent on trade, private investment and a bulk of sectors, this was called to cut the importance of the oil for the macroeconomy, and its dominance on the export earnings. Economic growth during the 1980s was nil, and the period is often called a "lost decade" for Mexico.
