= Musée Delta =

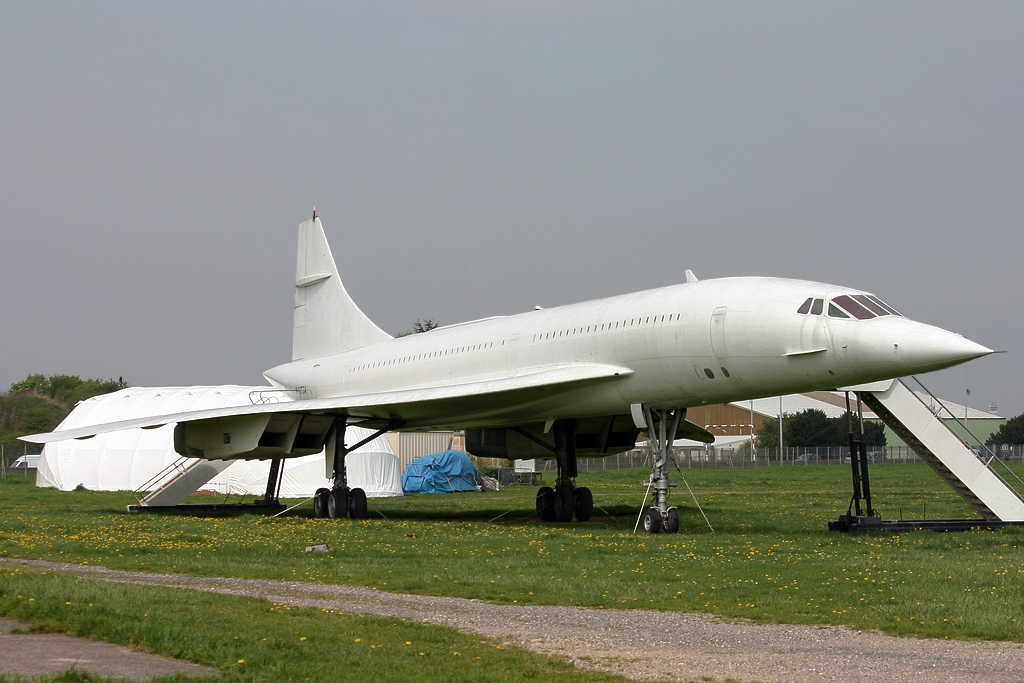
- Concorde at the Musée Delta
- Established: 1988
- Location: 1 avenue Bernard Lathière 91200 Athis-Mons, France
- Coordinates: 48.7162379°N 2.3714161°E
- Type: Aviation museum
- Visitors: 4200
- Website: http://museedelta.wixsite.com/musee-delta

The Musée Delta (lit. 'Delta Museum') is an aviation museum situated at the edge of Paris-Orly airport in Athis-Mons in the département of Essonne in France. Its primary focus is the history of delta wing aircraft. It forms a counterpart to the Musée de l'air et de l'espace at Le Bourget.

The museum opened on 12 April 1988 with the arrival of Concorde 102 (F-WTSA), veteran of 314 flights between 1973 and 1976. In 2014, the museum was temporarily closed during the extension of the local tram service.

The museum is open between 15 January and 15 December on Wednesdays and Saturdays from 2pm and 6pm, and Sundays between April and July.
