= List of saros series for solar eclipses =

Solar eclipses are grouped by their saros number; each series lasts between 1200 and 1600 years and contains from 69 to 87 solar eclipses (most often 70 to 73). Solar eclipses in odd series exist at the ascending node of the Moon's orbit, and even series occur at the descending nodes.

Each series begins with partial eclipses, transitions into umbral eclipses (which includes annular, hybrid, and total eclipses), and then reverses back to partial before ending. The counts for each type and their order are listed below. Ongoing saros series are highlighted according to the type of eclipses currently being produced.

Series have been indexed as -14 to 190 (active between roughly 2000 BCE and 3000 CE), with events summarized:

No.	Count	First eclipse	Last eclipse	Len. (y)	Counts by type							
No.	Count	First eclipse	Last eclipse	Len. (y)	Par.	Umb.	Par.	Order	Ann.	Hyb.	Tot.	Notes
-14	72	15 Apr 3289 BC	22 May 2009 BC	1280.1	6	59	7	AHT	23	3	33	
-13	73	15 Mar 3278 BC	2 May 1980 BC	1298.1	7	58	8	THA	17	2	39	
-12	73	6 Mar 3231 BC	22 Apr 1933 BC	1298.1	8	45	8	THA	42	2	1	
-11	72	17 Mar 3148 BC	24 Apr 1868 BC	1280.1	6	56	10	AHT	24	3	29	
-10	75	24 Jan 3173 BC	4 Apr 1839 BC	1334.2	9	46	20	THA	4	2	40	
-9	75	15 Jan 3126 BC	25 Mar 1792 BC	1334.2	10	41	24	THA	38	2	1	
-8	74	27 Jan 3043 BC	27 Mar 1727 BC	1316.2	8	43	23	AHT	25	3	15	
-7	86	18 Aug 3249 BC	24 Feb 1716 BC	1532.5	21	43	22	THA	1	1	41	
-6	87	19 Jul 3238 BC	3 Feb 1687 BC	1550.5	25	40	22	HA	37	3	0	Longest series in this set
-5	86	10 Aug 3137 BC	16 Feb 1604 BC	1532.5	21	43	22	AHT	26	3	14	
-4	80	29 Jun 3144 BC	1 Nov 1720 BC	1424.3	23	43	14	THA	1	1	41	
-3	73	20 Jun 3097 BC	7 Aug 1799 BC	1298.1	24	41	8	A	41	0	0	
-2	75	3 Jul 3014 BC	10 Sep 1680 BC	1334.2	21	43	10	AHT	27	4	13	
-1	74	1 Jun 3003 BC	31 Jul 1687 BC	1316.2	18	48	8	THA	1	3	44	
0	72	23 May 2956 BC	29 Jun 1676 BC	1280.1	14	51	7	THA	49	1	1	Peculiar order (Note: Three partial eclipses happen after the first six umbral ones (counted as "partial eclipses before the umbral eclipses"))
1	72	4 Jun 2873 BC	11 Jul 1593 BC	1280.1	9	56	7	AHT	39	5	12	
2	73	4 May 2862 BC	21 Jun 1564 BC	1298.1	8	58	7	THA	3	12	43	
3	72	24 Apr 2815 BC	1 Jun 1535 BC	1280.1	8	57	7	THA	50	2	5	
4	72	6 May 2732 BC	13 Jun 1452 BC	1280.1	7	57	8	AHT	29	17	11	
5	73	4 Apr 2721 BC	24 May 1423 BC	1298.1	7	59	7	THA	11	4	44	
6	72	27 Mar 2674 BC	3 May 1394 BC	1280.1	7	56	9	THA	47	2	7	
7	72	8 Apr 2591 BC	16 May 1311 BC	1280.1	6	57	9	AHT	30	6	21	
8	73	7 Mar 2580 BC	26 Apr 1282 BC	1298.1	7	56	10	THA	10	1	45	
9	74	6 Feb 2569 BC	4 Apr 1253 BC	1316.2	9	43	22	THA	32	3	8	
10	73	28 Feb 2468 BC	18 Apr 1170 BC	1298.1	8	42	23	AHT	30	3	9	
11	76	6 Jan 2493 BC	28 Mar 1141 BC	1352.2	10	44	22	T	0	0	44	
12	86	20 Aug 2663 BC	25 Feb 1130 BC	1532.5	23	41	22	THA	30	3	8	
13	85	23 Sep 2544 BC	19 Mar 1029 BC	1514.5	20	41	24	AHT	30	3	8	
14	85	11 Aug 2551 BC	6 Feb 1036 BC	1514.5	21	43	21	T	0	0	43	
15	75	1 Jul 2558 BC	8 Sep 1224 BC	1334.2	24	42	9	THA	29	3	10	
16	85	23 Jul 2457 BC	18 Jan 942 BC	1514.5	22	42	21	AHT	33	2	7	
17	74	3 Jul 2428 BC	1 Sep 1112 BC	1316.2	21	44	9	T	0	0	44	
18	73	2 Jun 2417 BC	21 Jul 1119 BC	1298.1	22	44	7	THA	28	3	13	
19	73	15 Jun 2334 BC	1 Aug 1036 BC	1298.1	21	44	8	AHT	36	2	6	
20	72	5 Jun 2287 BC	13 Jul 1007 BC	1280.1	8	57	7	AHT	12	2	43	
21	72	5 May 2276 BC	11 Jun 996 BC	1280.1	8	58	6	THA	28	4	26	
22	71	28 May 2175 BC	23 Jun 913 BC	1262.1	8	56	7	AHT	49	2	5	
23	72	7 May 2146 BC	15 Jun 866 BC	1280.1	6	59	7	AHT	14	3	42	
24	72	6 Apr 2135 BC	14 May 855 BC	1280.1	8	57	7	THA	26	16	15	
25	71	30 Apr 2034 BC	26 May 772 BC	1262.1	7	56	8	AHT	52	1	3	
26	72	8 Apr 2005 BC	17 May 725 BC	1280.1	6	58	8	AHT	10	7	41	
27	72	9 Mar 1994 BC	16 Apr 714 BC	1280.1	8	49	15	THA	20	15	14	
28	72	22 Mar 1911 BC	28 Apr 631 BC	1280.1	7	42	23	A	42	0	0	
29	73	1 Mar 1882 BC	19 Apr 584 BC	1298.1	7	45	21	AHT	3	14	28	
30	83	12 Oct 2052 BC	18 Mar 573 BC	1478.4	19	43	21	THA	24	5	14	
31	74	31 Jan 1806 BC	31 Mar 490 BC	1316.2	10	40	24	A	40	0	0	
32	84	24 Sep 1958 BC	10 Mar 461 BC	1496.5	19	44	21	AHT	2	3	39	
33	84	2 Aug 1983 BC	17 Jan 486 BC	1496.5	23	42	19	THA	23	4	15	
34	86	4 Aug 1918 BC	9 Feb 385 BC	1532.5	23	40	23	A	40	0	0	
35	84	25 Jul 1871 BC	9 Jan 374 BC	1496.5	22	43	19	AHT	3	2	38	
36	73	23 Jun 1860 BC	11 Aug 562 BC	1298.1	22	44	7	THA	23	3	18	
37	73	25 Jun 1795 BC	12 Aug 497 BC	1298.1	24	40	9	A	40	0	0	
38	73	26 Jun 1730 BC	14 Aug 432 BC	1298.1	17	48	8	AHT	8	2	38	
39	72	26 May 1719 BC	3 Jul 439 BC	1280.1	9	57	6	THA	22	3	32	
40	72	28 May 1654 BC	4 Jul 374 BC	1280.1	11	53	8	A	53	0	0	
41	72	28 May 1589 BC	5 Jul 309 BC	1280.1	7	58	7	AHT	19	2	37	
42	72	28 Apr 1578 BC	5 Jun 298 BC	1280.1	8	58	6	THA	21	3	34	
43	72	29 Apr 1513 BC	5 Jun 233 BC	1280.1	8	55	9	A	55	0	0	
44	72	30 Apr 1448 BC	7 Jun 168 BC	1280.1	6	58	8	AHT	21	2	35	
45	72	30 Mar 1437 BC	7 May 157 BC	1280.1	7	57	8	THA	18	3	36	
46	72	1 Apr 1372 BC	8 May 92 BC	1280.1	8	43	21	A	43	0	0	
47	72	2 Apr 1307 BC	10 May 27 BC	1280.1	6	54	12	AHT	21	3	30	
48	74	8 Feb 1332 BC	9 Apr 16 BC	1316.2	9	45	20	THA	6	2	37	
49	72	22 Feb 1249 BC	29 Mar 32	1280.1	9	40	23	A	40	0	0	
50	73	11 Feb 1202 BC	1 Apr 97	1298.1	8	43	22	AHT	22	3	18	
51	85	2 Sep 1408 BC	29 Feb 108	1514.5	21	43	21	THA	3	4	36	
52	86	14 Aug 1379 BC	19 Feb 155	1532.5	24	40	22	A	40	0	0	
53	84	6 Sep 1278 BC	21 Feb 220	1496.5	20	43	21	AHT	22	4	17	
54	74	25 Jul 1285 BC	23 Sep 32	1316.2	21	44	9	THA	3	15	26	
55	73	6 Jul 1256 BC	23 Aug 43	1298.1	24	41	8	A	41	0	0	
56	74	17 Jul 1173 BC	15 Sep 144	1316.2	21	43	10	AHT	13	15	15	
57	73	17 Jun 1162 BC	4 Aug 137	1298.1	14	52	7	THA	6	13	33	
58	72	7 Jun 1115 BC	14 Jul 166	1280.1	21	44	7	A	44	0	0	
59	72	19 Jun 1032 BC	27 Jul 249	1280.1	9	55	8	AHT	23	16	16	
60	72	18 May 1021 BC	26 Jun 260	1280.1	8	58	6	THA	14	4	40	
61	71	10 May 974 BC	5 Jun 289	1262.1	8	56	7	THA	52	1	3	
62	71	22 May 891 BC	17 Jun 372	1262.1	7	57	7	AHT	25	5	27	
63	72	20 Apr 880 BC	29 May 401	1280.1	7	58	7	THA	14	2	42	
64	71	11 Apr 833 BC	8 May 430	1262.1	8	52	11	THA	46	2	4	
65	71	24 Apr 750 BC	20 May 513	1262.1	6	56	9	AHT	27	4	25	
66	73	12 Mar 757 BC	1 May 542	1298.1	8	48	17	THA	4	1	43	
67	72	4 Mar 710 BC	10 Apr 571	1280.1	9	41	22	THA	34	2	5	
68	72	16 Mar 627 BC	22 Apr 654	1280.1	7	42	23	AHT	28	3	11	
69	78	9 Dec 725 BC	22 Mar 665	1388.3	14	43	21	T	0	0	43	
70	84	5 Sep 822 BC	19 Feb 676	1496.5	23	40	21	THA	32	3	5	
71	82	19 Oct 685 BC	14 Mar 777	1460.4	18	41	23	AHT	29	3	9	
72	83	16 Aug 728 BC	21 Jan 752	1478.4	22	43	18	T	0	0	43	
73	72	27 Jul 699 BC	3 Sep 582	1280.1	23	41	8	THA	31	3	7	
74	75	8 Aug 616 BC	18 Oct 719	1334.2	22	41	12	AHT	30	3	8	
75	73	7 Jul 605 BC	26 Aug 694	1298.1	21	44	8	T	0	0	44	
76	72	18 Jun 576 BC	25 Jul 705	1280.1	22	43	7	THA	30	5	8	
77	71	11 Jul 475 BC	6 Aug 788	1262.1	18	45	8	AHT	36	2	7	
78	72	9 Jun 464 BC	18 Jul 817	1280.1	9	56	7	AHT	9	2	45	
79	71	21 May 435 BC	16 Jun 828	1262.1	8	57	6	THA	30	16	11	
80	71	13 Jun 334 BC	9 Jul 929	1262.1	7	56	8	AHT	48	2	6	
81	72	12 May 323 BC	19 Jun 958	1280.1	7	58	7	AHT	5	9	44	
82	71	22 Apr 294 BC	19 May 969	1262.1	8	55	8	THA	39	5	11	
83	71	5 May 211 BC	30 May 1052	1262.1	7	55	9	AHT	51	1	3	
84	72	14 Apr 182 BC	22 May 1099	1280.1	7	55	10	AHT	1	11	43	
85	72	14 Mar 171 BC	20 Apr 1110	1280.1	8	45	19	THA	29	4	12	
86	71	6 Apr 70 BC	2 May 1193	1262.1	7	41	23	A	41	0	0	
87	73	23 Feb 77 BC	13 Apr 1222	1298.1	9	44	20	HT	0	2	42	
88	83	6 Oct 247 BC	12 Mar 1233	1478.4	20	43	20	THA	26	4	13	
89	73	4 Feb 18	24 Mar 1316	1298.1	10	40	23	A	40	0	0	
90	83	28 Sep 135 BC	4 Mar 1345	1478.4	20	42	21	HT	0	2	40	
91	75	6 Aug 160 BC	16 Oct 1175	1334.2	23	42	10	THA	25	3	14	
92	74	19 Aug 77 BC	16 Oct 1240	1316.2	23	40	11	A	40	0	0	
93	74	9 Aug 30 BC	8 Oct 1287	1316.2	20	44	10	AHT	3	1	40	
94	72	9 Jul 19 BC	16 Aug 1262	1280.1	21	44	7	THA	24	2	18	
95	71	11 Jul 47	6 Aug 1309	1262.1	22	41	8	A	41	0	0	
96	72	1 Jul 94	8 Aug 1374	1280.1	10	55	7	AHT	14	2	39	
97	71	11 Jun 123	8 Jul 1385	1262.1	8	57	6	THA	23	2	32	
98	71	12 Jun 188	9 Jul 1450	1262.1	9	54	8	A	54	0	0	
99	72	3 Jun 235	11 Jul 1515	1280.1	7	57	8	AHT	18	2	37	
100	71	13 May 264	10 Jun 1526	1262.1	7	57	7	THA	21	2	34	
101	71	15 May 329	21 Jun 1591	1262.1	8	53	10	A	53	0	0	
102	71	5 May 376	12 Jun 1638	1262.1	7	56	8	AHT	19	3	34	
103	72	4 Apr 387	22 May 1667	1280.1	8	50	14	THA	13	3	34	
104	70	17 Apr 470	13 May 1714	1244.0	7	41	22	A	41	0	0	
105	72	27 Mar 499	16 May 1779	1280.1	7	45	20	AHT	20	4	21	
106	75	23 Jan 456	14 Apr 1790	1334.2	12	43	20	THA	5	4	34	
107	72	15 Feb 557	5 Apr 1837	1280.1	10	40	22	A	40	0	0	
108	76	4 Jan 550	8 Apr 1902	1352.2	12	43	21	AHT	20	5	18	
109	81	7 Sep 416	3 Feb 1859	1442.4	21	43	17	THA	4	15	24	
110	72	30 Aug 463	17 Oct 1743	1280.1	23	39	10	A	39	0	0	
111	79	30 Aug 528	5 Jan 1935	1406.3	21	42	16	AHT	11	14	17	
112	72	31 Jul 539	19 Sep 1819	1280.1	21	43	8	THA	5	14	24	
113	71	22 Jul 586	28 Aug 1848	1262.1	23	40	8	A	40	0	0	
114	72	23 Jul 651	12 Sep 1931	1280.1	18	46	8	AHT	13	16	17	
115	72	21 Jun 662	12 Aug 1942	1280.1	10	55	7	THA	14	4	37	
116	70	23 Jun 727	22 Jul 1971	1244.0	10	53	7	A	53	0	0	
117	71	24 Jun 792	3 Aug 2054	1262.1	8	56	7	AHT	23	5	28	Latest was 2018 Jul 13 (partial), next is 2036 Jul 23 (partial)
118	72	24 May 803	15 Jul 2083	1280.1	8	57	7	THA	15	2	40	Latest was 2011 Jun 1 (partial), next is 2029 Jun 12 (partial)
119	71	15 May 850	24 Jun 2112	1262.1	8	54	9	THA	51	1	2	Latest was 2022 Apr 30 (partial), next is 2040 May 11 (partial)
120	71	27 May 933	7 Jul 2195	1262.1	7	55	9	AHT	25	4	26	Latest was 2015 Mar 20 (total), next is 2033 Mar 30 (total)
121	71	25 Apr 944	7 Jun 2206	1262.1	7	55	9	THA	11	2	42	Latest was 2026 Feb 17 (annular), next is February 28, 2044 (annular)
122	70	17 Apr 991	17 May 2235	1244.0	8	42	20	THA	37	2	3	Latest was 2019 Jan 6 (partial), next is 2037 Jan 16 (partial)
123	70	29 Apr 1074	31 May 2318	1244.0	6	44	20	AHT	27	3	14	Latest was 2011 Nov 25 (partial), next is 2029 Dec 5 (partial)
124	73	6 Mar 1049	11 May 2347	1298.1	9	44	20	TH	0	1	43	Latest was 2022 Oct 25 (partial), next is 2040 Nov 4 (partial)
125	73	4 Feb 1060	9 Apr 2358	1298.1	12	40	21	THA	34	2	4	Latest was 2015 Sep 13 (partial), next is 2033 Sep 23 (partial)
126	72	10 Mar 1179	3 May 2459	1280.1	8	41	23	AHT	28	3	10	Latest was 2026 Aug 12 (total), next is 2044 Aug 23 (total)
127	82	10 Oct 991	21 Mar 2452	1460.4	20	42	20	T	0	0	42	Latest was 2019 Jul 2 (total), next is 2037 Jul 13 (total)
128	73	29 Aug 984	1 Nov 2282	1298.1	24	40	9	THA	32	4	4	Latest was 2012 May 20 (annular), next is 2030 Jun 1 (annular)
129	80	3 Oct 1103	21 Feb 2528	1424.3	20	41	19	AHT	29	3	9	Latest was 2023 Apr 20 (hybrid), next is 2041 Apr 30 (total)
130	73	20 Aug 1096	25 Oct 2394	1298.1	21	43	9	T	0	0	43	Latest was 2016 Mar 9 (total), next is 2034 Mar 20 (total)
131	70	1 Aug 1125	2 Sep 2369	1244.0	22	41	7	THA	30	5	6	Latest was 2009 Jan 26 (annular), next is 2027 Feb 6 (annular)
132	71	13 Aug 1208	25 Sep 2470	1262.1	20	42	9	AHT	33	2	7	Latest was 2019 Dec 26 (annular), next is 2038 Jan 5 (annular)
133	72	13 Jul 1219	5 Sep 2499	1280.1	12	53	7	AHT	6	1	46	Latest was 2012 Nov 13 (total), next is 2030 Nov 25 (total)
134	71	22 Jun 1248	6 Aug 2510	1262.1	10	54	7	THA	30	16	8	Latest was 2023 Oct 14 (annular), next is 2041 Oct 25 (annular)
135	71	5 Jul 1331	17 Aug 2593	1262.1	10	53	8	AHT	45	2	6	Latest was 2016 Sep 1 (annular), next is 2034 Sep 12 (annular)
136	71	14 Jun 1360	30 Jul 2622	1262.1	8	56	7	AHT	6	6	44	Latest was 2009 July 22 (total), next is 2027 Aug 2 (total)
137	70	25 May 1389	28 Jun 2633	1244.0	8	55	7	THAHA	36	9	10	Latest was 2020 Jun 21 (annular), next is 2038 Jul 2 (annular); Peculiar order (Note: In order: 10 total, 6 hybrid, 4 annular, 3 hybrid, 32 annular)
138	70	6 Jun 1472	11 Jul 2716	1244.0	7	54	9	AHT	50	1	3	Latest was 2013 May 10 (annular), next is 2031 May 21 (annular)
139	71	17 May 1501	3 Jul 2763	1262.1	7	55	9	HT	0	12	43	Latest was 2024 Apr 8 (total), next is 2042 Apr 20 (total)
140	71	16 Apr 1512	1 Jun 2774	1262.1	8	47	16	THA	32	4	11	Latest was 2017 Feb 26 (annular), next is 2035 Mar 9 (annular)
141	70	19 May 1613	13 Jun 2857	1244.0	7	41	22	A	41	0	0	Latest was 2010 Jan 15 (annular), next is 2028 Jan 26 (annular)
142	72	17 Apr 1624	5 Jun 2904	1280.1	8	44	20	HT	0	1	43	Latest was 2020 Dec 14 (total), next is 2038 Dec 26 (total)
143	72	7 Mar 1617	23 Apr 2897	1280.1	10	42	20	THA	26	4	12	Latest was 2013 Nov 3 (hybrid), next is 2031 Nov 14 (hybrid)
144	70	11 Apr 1736	5 May 2980	1244.0	8	39	23	A	39	0	0	Latest was 2024 Oct 2 (annular), next is 2042 Oct 14 (annular)
145	77	4 Jan 1639	17 Apr 3009	1370.3	14	43	20	AHT	1	1	41	Latest was 2017 Aug 21 (total), next is 2035 Sep 2 (total)
146	76	19 Sep 1541	29 Dec 2893	1352.2	22	41	13	THA	24	4	13	Latest was 2010 Jul 11 (total), next is 2028 Jul 22 (total)
147	80	12 Oct 1624	24 Feb 3049	1424.3	21	40	19	A	40	0	0	Latest was 2021 Jun 10 (annular), next is 2039 Jun 21 (annular)
148	75	21 Sep 1653	12 Dec 2987	1334.2	20	43	12	AHT	2	1	40	Latest was 2014 Apr 29 (annular), next is 2032 May 9 (annular)
149	71	21 Aug 1664	28 Sep 2926	1262.1	21	43	7	THA	23	3	17	Latest was 2025 Mar 29 (partial), next is 2043 Apr 9 (total)
150	71	24 Aug 1729	29 Sep 2991	1262.1	22	40	9	A	40	0	0	Latest was 2018 Feb 15 (partial), next is 2036 Feb 27 (partial)
151	72	14 Aug 1776	1 Oct 3056	1280.1	18	46	8	AHT	6	1	39	Latest was 2011 Jan 4 (partial), next is 2029 Jan 14 (partial)
152	70	26 Jul 1805	20 Aug 3049	1244.0	9	55	6	THA	22	3	30	Latest was 2021 Dec 4 (total), next is 2039 Dec 15 (total)
153	70	28 Jul 1870	22 Aug 3114	1244.0	13	49	8	A	49	0	0	Latest was 2014 Oct 23 (partial), next is 2032 Nov 3 (partial)
154	71	19 Jul 1917	25 Aug 3179	1262.1	7	56	8	AHT	17	3	36	Latest was 2025 Sep 21 (partial), next is 2043 Oct 3 (annular)
155	71	17 Jun 1928	24 Jul 3190	1262.1	8	56	7	THA	20	3	33	Latest was 2018 Aug 11 (partial), next is 2036 Aug 21 (partial)
156	69	1 Jul 2011	14 Jul 3237	1226.0	8	52	9	A	52	0	0	Latest was 2011 Jul 1 (partial), next is 2029 Jul 11 (partial)
157	70	21 Jun 2058	17 Jul 3302	1244.0	6	56	8	AHT	19	3	34	
158	70	20 May 2069	16 Jun 3313	1244.0	7	53	10	THA	16	2	35	
159	70	23 May 2134	17 Jun 3378	1244.0	8	41	21	A	41	0	0	
160	71	13 May 2181	20 Jun 3443	1262.1	7	45	19	AHT	20	3	22	
161	72	1 Apr 2174	20 May 3454	1280.1	9	43	20	THA	5	3	35	
162	70	15 Apr 2257	10 May 3501	1244.0	9	39	22	A	39	0	0	
163	72	25 Mar 2286	13 May 3566	1280.1	9	42	21	AHT	20	4	18	
164	80	24 Oct 2098	10 Mar 3523	1424.3	20	43	17	THA	3	4	36	
165	72	16 Oct 2145	2 Dec 3425	1280.1	22	39	11	A	39	0	0	
166	77	29 Oct 2228	8 Feb 3599	1370.3	19	42	16	AHT	21	5	16	
167	72	6 Sep 2203	24 Oct 3483	1280.1	21	43	8	THA	3	14	26	
168	70	28 Aug 2250	22 Sep 3494	1244.0	23	40	7	A	40	0	0	
169	71	10 Sep 2333	16 Oct 3595	1262.1	19	44	8	AHT	13	16	15	
170	71	9 Aug 2344	15 Sep 3606	1262.1	11	53	7	THA	6	11	36	
171	69	1 Aug 2391	14 Aug 3617	1226.0	14	48	7	A	48	0	0	
172	70	13 Aug 2474	8 Sep 3718	1244.0	8	54	8	AHT	23	16	15	
173	70	12 Jul 2485	8 Aug 3729	1244.0	7	56	7	THA	12	3	41	
174	69	4 Jul 2532	18 Jul 3758	1226.0	8	53	8	THA	50	2	1	
175	70	5 Jul 2597	31 Jul 3841	1244.0	7	55	8	AHT	26	5	24	
176	71	4 Jun 2608	12 Jul 3870	1262.1	7	55	9	THA	10	2	43	
177	69	27 May 2655	10 Jun 3881	1226.0	8	43	18	THA	37	3	3	
178	70	9 Jun 2738	4 Jul 3982	1244.0	6	43	21	AHT	28	4	11	
179	71	28 Apr 2731	3 Jun 3993	1262.1	8	44	19	T	0	0	44	
180	70	8 Apr 2760	2 May 4004	1244.0	10	40	20	THA	33	2	5	
181	71	20 Apr 2843	27 May 4105	1262.1	8	41	22	AHT	29	3	9	
182	79	11 Dec 2691	15 Apr 4098	1406.3	18	42	19	T	0	0	42	
183	72	20 Oct 2666	6 Dec 3946	1280.1	22	40	10	THA	30	4	6	
184	77	24 Nov 2785	5 Mar 4156	1370.3	19	40	18	AHT	30	3	7	
185	73	1 Oct 2760	29 Nov 4058	1298.2	21	42	10	T	0	0	42	
186	70	11 Sep 2789	6 Oct 4033	1244.0	22	41	7	THA	29	4	8	
187	70	23 Sep 2872	19 Oct 4116	1244.0	20	41	9	AHT	34	2	5	
188	71	23 Aug 2883	30 Sep 4145	1262.1	16	48	7	AHT	3	1	44	
189	70	4 Aug 2912	29 Aug 4156	1244.0	11	52	7	THA	27	6	19	
190	70	17 Aug 2995	12 Sep 4239	1244.0	11	51	8	AHT	46	2	3	

== See also ==
- List of saros series for lunar eclipses
- Lists of solar eclipses
