= Solar Saros 159 =

Saros cycle series 159 for solar eclipses

Saros cycle series 159 for solar eclipses will occur at the Moon's ascending node, repeating every 18 years, 11 days, containing 70 eclipses, 41 of which will be umbral (all annular). The first eclipse of the series will be on 23 May 2134 and the last will be on 17 June 3378.

The longest eclipse will be 10 minutes 25 seconds on 8 January 2513. This solar saros is linked to Lunar Saros 152.

== Umbral eclipses ==
Umbral eclipses (annular, total and hybrid) can be further classified as either: 1) Central (two limits), 2) Central (one limit) or 3) Non-Central (one limit). The statistical distribution of these classes in Saros series 159 appears in the following table.

Classification	Number	Percent
All Umbral eclipses	41	100.00%
Central (two limits)	40	97.56%
Central (one limit)	0	0.00%
Non-central (one limit)	1	2.44%

== All eclipses ==
Saros	Member	Date	Time (Greatest) UTC	Type	Location Lat, Long	Gamma	Mag.	Width (km)	Duration (min:sec)	Ref
159	1	May 23, 2134	23:01:18	Partial	63.7N 55.3E	1.5285	0.0308			
159	2	June 3, 2152	6:11:19	Partial	64.5N 61.5W	1.4645	0.1478			
159	3	June 14, 2170	13:15:11	Partial	65.4N 177.1W	1.3963	0.2719			
159	4	June 24, 2188	20:14:39	Partial	66.4N 68E	1.3252	0.4008			
159	5	July 7, 2206	3:10:26	Partial	67.4N 46.3W	1.2516	0.5335			
159	6	July 17, 2224	10:03:58	Partial	68.4N 160.6W	1.1767	0.6677			
159	7	July 28, 2242	16:57:12	Partial	69.3N 84.8E	1.102	0.8004			
159	8	August 7, 2260	23:51:13	Partial	70.2N 30.7W	1.0287	0.9293			
159	9	August 19, 2278	6:46:23	Annular	75.8N 155.8E	0.9569	0.9712	367	1m 53s	
159	10	August 29, 2296	13:45:40	Annular	66.6N 15E	0.8888	0.9689	245	2m 20s	
159	11	September 10, 2314	20:49:11	Annular	56.8N 103.3W	0.8247	0.9654	220	2m 54s	
159	12	September 21, 2332	3:59:10	Annular	47.9N 142.3E	0.7666	0.9613	217	3m 34s	
159	13	October 2, 2350	11:14:07	Annular	39.8N 28.7E	0.7131	0.9568	222	4m 22s	
159	14	October 12, 2368	18:37:20	Annular	32.5N 85.8W	0.6672	0.9522	233	5m 13s	
159	15	October 24, 2386	2:06:43	Annular	26.1N 158.8E	0.6268	0.9475	246	6m 9s	
159	16	November 3, 2404	9:44:07	Annular	20.5N 42E	0.5935	0.943	260	7m 5s	
159	17	November 14, 2422	17:27:40	Annular	15.9N 75.8W	0.5657	0.9386	275	8m 1s	
159	18	November 25, 2440	1:18:39	Annular	12.2N 164.9E	0.5445	0.9347	290	8m 52s	
159	19	December 6, 2458	9:14:46	Annular	9.5N 44.7E	0.528	0.9311	303	9m 34s	
159	20	December 16, 2476	17:15:18	Annular	7.7N 76.3W	0.5154	0.9282	314	10m 4s	
159	21	December 28, 2494	1:19:29	Annular	6.9N 161.8E	0.5061	0.9257	323	10m 22s	
159	22	January 8, 2513	9:25:23	Annular	7N 39.7E	0.4982	0.924	329	10m 25s	
159	23	January 19, 2531	17:31:19	Annular	7.9N 82.4W	0.4908	0.9228	332	10m 17s	
159	24	January 30, 2549	1:34:51	Annular	9.4N 156.1E	0.4815	0.9223	331	10m 0s	
159	25	February 10, 2567	9:35:51	Annular	11.4N 35.2E	0.4703	0.9223	328	9m 37s	
159	26	February 20, 2585	17:31:56	Annular	13.8N 84.3W	0.455	0.923	321	9m 11s	
159	27	March 5, 2603	1:21:16	Annular	16.3N 158.1E	0.4345	0.9243	312	8m 45s	
159	28	March 15, 2621	9:03:08	Annular	18.9N 42.7E	0.408	0.926	301	8m 20s	
159	29	March 26, 2639	16:36:39	Annular	21.4N 70.2W	0.3749	0.9281	288	7m 58s	
159	30	April 6, 2657	0:01:46	Annular	23.6N 179.4E	0.335	0.9305	274	7m 38s	
159	31	April 17, 2675	7:16:48	Annular	25.3N 72.2E	0.2868	0.9331	259	7m 23s	
159	32	April 27, 2693	14:23:45	Annular	26.4N 32.5W	0.232	0.9359	245	7m 12s	
159	33	May 9, 2711	21:21:41	Annular	26.5N 134.7W	0.1701	0.9385	231	7m 5s	
159	34	May 20, 2729	4:11:51	Annular	25.6N 125.3E	0.1017	0.9412	219	7m 1s	
159	35	May 31, 2747	10:54:36	Annular	23.5N 27E	0.0271	0.9436	208	7m 1s	
159	36	June 10, 2765	17:31:59	Annular	20.2N 70.4W	-0.052	0.9459	200	7m 2s	
159	37	June 22, 2783	0:05:19	Annular	15.7N 167.4W	-0.1347	0.9477	194	7m 4s	
159	38	July 2, 2801	6:34:26	Annular	10.2N 95.8E	-0.221	0.9492	191	7m 3s	
159	39	July 13, 2819	13:03:16	Annular	3.8N 1.7W	-0.3075	0.9502	192	6m 58s	
159	40	July 23, 2837	19:31:12	Annular	3.5S 99.8W	-0.3949	0.9508	196	6m 47s	
159	41	August 4, 2855	2:02:02	Annular	11.3S 160.5E	-0.4802	0.951	204	6m 32s	
159	42	August 14, 2873	8:34:15	Annular	19.8S 59.8E	-0.5646	0.9506	218	6m 12s	
159	43	August 25, 2891	15:12:39	Annular	28.6S 43.3W	-0.6441	0.9498	238	5m 52s	
159	44	September 5, 2909	21:55:40	Annular	37.7S 148.5W	-0.7198	0.9486	269	5m 31s	
159	45	September 17, 2927	4:46:05	Annular	47.1S 103.2E	-0.7897	0.947	314	5m 10s	
159	46	September 27, 2945	11:43:51	Annular	56.6S 9.2W	-0.8539	0.9451	387	4m 50s	
159	47	October 8, 2963	18:51:34	Annular	66S 129W	-0.9105	0.9428	514	4m 32s	
159	48	October 19, 2981	2:08:17	Annular	74.1S 93.7E	-0.96	0.94	820	4m 14s	
159	49	October 30, 2999	9:34:33	Annular	70.9S 84.7W	-1.0023	0.9586	-	-	
159	50	November 10, 3017	17:20:26	Partial	70.0S 149.2E	-1.0372	0.8987	-	-	
159	51	November 22, 3035	00:56:10	Partial	69.1S 21.3E	-1.0649	0.8511	-	-	
159	52	December 2, 3053	08:50:05	Partial	68.0S 108.0W	-1.0866	0.8142	-	-	
159	53	December 13, 3071	16:52:15	Partial	66.9S 121.2E	-1.1023	0.7874	-	-	
159	54	December 24, 3089	01:00:48	Partial	65.9S 10.7W	-1.1136	0.7683	-	-	
159	55	January 5, 3108	09:15:32	Partial	64.9S 143.7W	-1.1207	0.7566	-	-	
159	56	January 15, 3126	17:32:44	Partial	63.9S 83.0E	-1.1266	0.7472	-	-	
159	57	January 27, 3144	01:53:56	Partial	63.1S 50.9W	-1.1302	0.7416	-	-	
159	58	February 6, 3162	10:13:36	Partial	62.4S 175.7E	-1.1352	0.7337	-	-	
159	59	February 17, 3180	18:33:35	Partial	61.9S 72.5E	-1.1408	0.7250	-	-	
159	60	February 28, 3198	02:49:03	Partial	61.5S 89.4W	-1.1507	0.7087	-	-	
159	61	March 10, 3216	11:02:26	Partial	61.2S 139.3E	-1.1629	0.6883	-	-	
159	62	March 21, 3216	19:09:35	Partial	61.2S 9.5E	-1.1811	0.6574	-	-	
159	63	April 1, 3252	03:11:27	Partial	61.3S 118.9W	-1.2039	0.6178	-	-	
159	64	April 12, 3270	11:05:55	Partial	61.6S 114.5E	-1.2333	0.5662	-	-	
159	65	April 22, 3288	18:54:48	Partial	62.0S 10.8W	-1.2678	0.5048	-	-	
159	66	May 5, 3306	02:36:34	Partial	62.6S 134.5W	-1.3088	0.4309	-	-	
159	67	May 15, 3324	10:12:08	Partial	63.3S 103.1W	-1.3555	0.3458	-	-	
159	68	May 26, 3342	17:41:58	Partial	64.1S 18.0W	-1.4075	0.2501	-	-	
159	69	June 6, 3360	01:07:24	Partial	65.0S 138.3W	-1.4633	0.1464	-	-	
159	70	June 17, 3378	08:27:56	Partial	65.9S 102.2E	-1.5236	0.0332	-	-	
