= Lunar Saros 154 =

Series of lunar eclipses

Saros cycle series 154 for lunar eclipses occurs at the moon's ascending node, 18 years 11 and 1/3 days. It contains 71 events.

This lunar saros is linked to Solar Saros 161.

Cat.	Saros	Mem	Date	Time UT (hr:mn)	Type	Gamma	Magnitude	Duration (min)			Contacts UT (hr:mn)						Chart
Cat.	Saros	Mem	Date	Greatest	Type	Gamma	Magnitude	Pen.	Par.	Tot.	P1	P4	U1	U2	U3	U4	Chart
10206	154	1	2237 May 10	23:45:33	Penumbral	1.5296	-0.9832	90.2			23:00:27	0:30:39					
10251	154	2	2255 May 22	6:33:13	Penumbral	1.4629	-0.8604	138.7			5:23:52	7:42:34					
10297	154	3	2273 Jun 01	13:13:38	Penumbral	1.3902	-0.7267	175.7			11:45:47	14:41:29					
10344	154	4	2291 Jun 12	19:47:41	Penumbral	1.3123	-0.5835	206.7			18:04:20	21:31:02					
10390	154	5	2309 Jun 24	2:17:42	Penumbral	1.2308	-0.4340	233.4			0:21:00	4:14:24					
10436	154	6	2327 Jul 05	8:44:32	Penumbral	1.1463	-0.2792	256.7			6:36:11	10:52:53					
10482	154	7	2345 Jul 15	15:10:59	Penumbral	1.0613	-0.1235	276.8			12:52:35	17:29:23					
10527	154	8	2363 Jul 26	21:36:02	Partial	0.9748	0.0346	294.5	45.8		19:08:47	0:03:17	21:13:08			21:58:56	
10572	154	9	2381 Aug 06	4:04:39	Partial	0.8908	0.1881	309.5	104.5		1:29:54	6:39:24	3:12:24			4:56:54	
10616	154	10	2399 Aug 17	10:35:26	Partial	0.8080	0.3391	322.3	137.2		7:54:17	13:16:35	9:26:50			11:44:02	
10661	154	11	2417 Aug 27	17:11:33	Partial	0.7295	0.4822	333.0	160.1		14:25:03	19:58:03	15:51:30			18:31:36	
10705	154	12	2435 Sep 07	23:52:36	Partial	0.6545	0.6186	341.9	177.3		21:01:39	2:43:33	22:23:57			1:21:15	
10749	154	13	2453 Sep 18	6:42:17	Partial	0.5863	0.7426	349.0	190.2		3:47:47	9:36:47	5:07:11			8:17:23	
10791	154	14	2471 Sep 29	13:39:37	Partial	0.5238	0.8561	354.7	200.0		10:42:16	16:36:58	11:59:37			15:19:37	
10833	154	15	2489 Oct 09	20:45:34	Partial	0.4679	0.9575	359.2	207.5		17:45:58	23:45:10	19:01:49			22:29:19	
10874	154	16	2507 Oct 22	4:00:56	Total	0.4193	1.0454	362.6	213.0	34.7	0:59:38	7:02:14	2:14:26	3:43:35	4:18:17	5:47:26	
10915	154	17	2525 Nov 01	11:26:31	Total	0.3790	1.1183	365.0	216.9	54.7	8:24:01	14:29:01	9:38:04	10:59:10	11:53:52	13:14:58	
10956	154	18	2543 Nov 12	19:00:51	Total	0.3451	1.1796	366.7	219.8	65.9	15:57:30	22:04:12	17:10:57	18:27:54	19:33:48	20:50:45	
10998	154	19	2561 Nov 23	2:43:40	Total	0.3178	1.2289	367.8	221.8	73.1	23:39:46	5:47:34	0:52:46	2:07:07	3:20:13	4:34:34	
11039	154	20	2579 Dec 04	10:34:13	Total	0.2963	1.2678	368.5	223.1	77.8	7:29:58	13:38:28	8:42:40	9:55:19	11:13:07	12:25:46	
11079	154	21	2597 Dec 14	18:32:07	Total	0.2805	1.2965	368.7	223.9	80.9	15:27:46	21:36:28	16:40:10	17:51:40	19:12:34	20:24:04	
11119	154	22	2615 Dec 27	2:33:58	Total	0.2678	1.3201	368.6	224.5	83.1	23:29:40	5:38:16	0:41:43	1:52:25	3:15:31	4:26:13	
11158	154	23	2634 Jan 06	10:40:40	Total	0.2586	1.3374	368.3	224.7	84.7	7:36:31	13:44:49	8:48:19	9:58:19	11:23:01	12:33:01	
11199	154	24	2652 Jan 17	18:48:27	Total	0.2501	1.3539	367.7	224.9	86.0	15:44:36	21:52:18	16:56:00	18:05:27	19:31:27	20:40:54	
11241	154	25	2670 Jan 28	2:57:43	Total	0.2422	1.3696	367.1	225.1	87.3	23:54:10	6:01:16	1:05:10	2:14:04	3:41:22	4:50:16	
11284	154	26	2688 Feb 08	11:03:30	Total	0.2311	1.3915	366.4	225.4	88.9	8:00:18	14:06:42	9:10:48	10:19:03	11:47:57	12:56:12	
11327	154	27	2706 Feb 19	19:08:31	Total	0.2189	1.4159	365.6	225.7	90.7	16:05:43	22:11:19	17:15:40	18:23:10	19:53:52	21:01:22	
11370	154	28	2724 Mar 02	3:07:53	Total	0.2019	1.4492	364.8	226.2	92.8	0:05:29	6:10:17	1:14:47	2:21:29	3:54:17	5:00:59	
11412	154	29	2742 Mar 13	11:02:37	Total	0.1801	1.4916	364.0	226.8	95.3	8:00:37	14:04:37	9:09:13	10:14:58	11:50:16	12:56:01	
11456	154	30	2760 Mar 23	18:49:54	Total	0.1517	1.5465	363.2	227.6	98.0	15:48:18	21:51:30	16:56:06	18:00:54	19:38:54	20:43:42	
11500	154	31	2778 Apr 04	2:31:48	Total	0.1179	1.6113	362.3	228.2	100.5	23:30:39	5:32:57	0:37:42	1:41:33	3:22:03	4:25:54	
11546	154	32	2796 Apr 14	10:05:56	Total	0.0771	1.6891	361.2	228.7	102.6	7:05:20	13:06:32	8:11:35	9:14:38	10:57:14	12:00:17	
11592	154	33	2814 Apr 25	17:33:04	Total	0.0297	1.7790	359.9	228.9	103.9	14:33:07	20:33:01	15:38:37	16:41:07	18:25:01	19:27:31	
11640	154	34	2832 May 6	0:53:25	Total	-0.0242	1.7921	358.2	228.4	103.9	21:54:19	3:52:31	22:59:13	0:01:28	1:45:22	2:47:37	
11686	154	35	2850 May 17	8:08:10	Total	-0.0838	1.6857	356.0	227.2	102.3	5:10:10	11:06:10	6:14:34	7:17:01	8:59:19	10:01:46	
11732	154	36	2868 May 27	15:16:52	Total	-0.1491	1.5686	353.1	224.9	98.4	12:20:19	18:13:25	13:24:25	14:27:40	16:06:04	17:09:19	
11778	154	37	2886 Jun 07	22:21:31	Total	-0.2186	1.4438	349.6	221.5	91.5	19:26:43	1:16:19	20:30:46	21:35:46	23:07:16	0:12:16	
11824	154	38	2904 Jun 19	5:22:46	Total	-0.2919	1.3119	345.2	216.6	80.5	2:30:10	8:15:22	3:34:28	4:42:31	6:03:01	7:11:04	
11869	154	39	2922 Jun 30	12:22:26	Total	-0.3673	1.1757	339.9	210.2	63.1	9:32:29	15:12:23	10:37:20	11:50:53	12:53:59	14:07:32	
11914	154	40	2940 Jul 10	19:20:01	Total	-0.4453	1.0346	333.6	202.0	29.2	16:33:13	22:06:49	17:39:01	19:05:25	19:34:37	21:01:01	
11960	154	41	2958 Jul 22	2:19:20	Partial	-0.5226	0.8946	326.5	192.0		23:36:05	5:02:35	0:43:20			3:55:20	
12006	154	42	2976 Aug 01	9:19:40	Partial	-0.6000	0.7543	318.4	180.1		6:40:28	11:58:52	7:49:37			10:49:43	
12050	154	43	2994 Aug 12	16:24:46	Partial	-0.6741	0.6196	309.7	166.3		13:49:55	18:59:37	15:01:37			17:47:55	

== See also ==
- List of lunar eclipses
  - List of Saros series for lunar eclipses
