= May 2107 lunar eclipse =

Astronomical event

- Penumbral eclipse
- Date: May 7, 2107
- Gamma: 1.5589
- Magnitude: −1.0103
- Saros cycle: 152 (1 of 72)
- Penumbral: 22 minutes, 12 seconds
Contacts (UTC)
- P1: 4:19:07
- Greatest: 4:30:26
- P4: 4:41:23

A penumbral lunar eclipse will occur at the Moon’s ascending node of orbit on Saturday, May 7, 2107, with an umbral magnitude of −0.9356. A lunar eclipse occurs when the Moon moves into the Earth's shadow, causing the Moon to be darkened. A penumbral lunar eclipse occurs when part or all of the Moon's near side passes into the Earth's penumbra. Unlike a solar eclipse, which can only be viewed from a relatively small area of the world, a lunar eclipse may be viewed from anywhere on the night side of Earth. The Moon's apparent diameter will be near the average diameter because it will occur 6.8 days after perigee (on April 30, 2107, at 10:00 UTC) and 6.9 days before apogee (on May 14, 2107, at 1:50 UTC).

This eclipse will be too small to be visually perceptible.

== Visibility ==
The eclipse will be completely visible over much of North and South America, western Europe, west and southern Africa, and Antarctica.

== Eclipse details ==
Shown below is a table displaying details about this particular lunar eclipse. It describes various parameters pertaining to this eclipse.

May 7, 2107 Lunar Eclipse Parameters
Parameter	Value
Penumbral Magnitude	0.00590
Umbral Magnitude	−1.01026
Gamma	1.55886
Sun Right Ascension	02h54m26.2s
Sun Declination	+16°38'11.0"
Sun Semi-Diameter	15'51.6"
Sun Equatorial Horizontal Parallax	08.7"
Moon Right Ascension	14h55m38.7s
Moon Declination	-15°10'36.1"
Moon Semi-Diameter	15'36.5"
Moon Equatorial Horizontal Parallax	0°57'17.0"
ΔT	134.8 s

== Eclipse season ==
This eclipse is part of an eclipse season, a period, roughly every six months, when eclipses occur. Only two (or occasionally three) eclipse seasons occur each year, and each season lasts about 35 days and repeats just short of six months (173 days) later; thus two full eclipse seasons always occur each year. Either two or three eclipses happen each eclipse season. In the sequence below, each eclipse is separated by a fortnight. The first and last eclipse in this sequence is separated by one synodic month.

Eclipse season of April–May 2107
April 7 Ascending node (full moon)	April 23 Descending node (new moon)	May 7 Ascending node (full moon)
Penumbral lunar eclipse Lunar Saros 114	Annular solar eclipse Solar Saros 140	Penumbral lunar eclipse Lunar Saros 152

== Related eclipses ==
=== Eclipses in 2107 ===
- A penumbral lunar eclipse on April 7.
- An annular solar eclipse on April 23.
- A penumbral lunar eclipse on May 7.
- A penumbral lunar eclipse on October 2.
- A total solar eclipse on October 16.

=== Metonic ===
- Preceded by: Lunar eclipse of July 19, 2103

=== Tzolkinex ===
- Followed by: Lunar eclipse of June 18, 2114

=== Lunar Saros 152 ===
- Followed by: Lunar eclipse of May 17, 2125

=== Inex ===
- Followed by: Lunar eclipse of April 16, 2136

=== Triad ===
- Preceded by: Lunar eclipse of July 5, 2020
- Followed by: Lunar eclipse of March 7, 2194

=== Lunar eclipses of 2103–2107 ===
This eclipse is a member of a semester series. An eclipse in a semester series of lunar eclipses repeats approximately every 177 days and 4 hours (a semester) at alternating nodes of the Moon's orbit.

The penumbral lunar eclipses on January 23, 2103 and July 19, 2103 occur in the previous lunar year eclipse set, and the penumbral lunar eclipses on April 7, 2107 and October 2, 2107 occur in the next lunar year eclipse set.

Lunar eclipse series sets from 2103 to 2107
Ascending node				Descending node			
Saros	Date Viewing	Type Chart	Gamma	Saros	Date Viewing	Type Chart	Gamma
112	2103 Jun 20	Penumbral	−1.3492	117	2103 Dec 13	Penumbral	1.2239
122	2104 Jun 08	Partial	−0.6362	127	2104 Dec 02	Partial	0.4910
132	2105 May 28	Total	0.1227	137	2105 Nov 21	Total	−0.1874
142	2106 May 17	Partial	0.8677	147	2106 Nov 11	Partial	−0.8947
152	2107 May 02	Penumbral	1.5588				

=== Metonic series ===
The Metonic cycle repeats nearly exactly every 19 years and represents a Saros cycle plus one lunar year. Because it occurs on the same calendar date, the Earth's shadow will in nearly the same location relative to the background stars.

This series has 9 events centered on May 6th and October 30th: (saros number)

Ascending node	Descending node
1. 2031 May 07.160 - penumbral (112); 2. 2050 May 06.937 - total (122); 3. 2069 May 06.380 - total (132); 4. 2088 May 05.677 - partial (142); 5. 2107 May 07.186 - penumbral (152)	1. 2031 Oct 30.323 - penumbral (117); 2. 2050 Oct 30.139 - total (127); 3. 2069 Oct 30.148 - total (137); 4. 2088 Oct 30.125 - partial (147)

=== Tritos series ===
This eclipse is a part of a tritos cycle, repeating at alternating nodes every 135 synodic months (≈ 3986.63 days, or 11 years minus 1 month). Their appearance and longitude are irregular due to a lack of synchronization with the anomalistic month (period of perigee), but groupings of 3 tritos cycles (≈ 33 years minus 3 months) come close (≈ 434.044 anomalistic months), so eclipses are similar in these groupings.

Series members between 1801 and 2183
1801 Sep 22 (Saros 124)	1812 Aug 22 (Saros 125)	1823 Jul 23 (Saros 126)	1834 Jun 21 (Saros 127)	1845 May 21 (Saros 128)
1856 Apr 20 (Saros 129)	1867 Mar 20 (Saros 130)	1878 Feb 17 (Saros 131)	1889 Jan 17 (Saros 132)	1899 Dec 17 (Saros 133)
1910 Nov 17 (Saros 134)	1921 Oct 16 (Saros 135)	1932 Sep 14 (Saros 136)	1943 Aug 15 (Saros 137)	1954 Jul 16 (Saros 138)
1965 Jun 14 (Saros 139)	1976 May 13 (Saros 140)	1987 Apr 14 (Saros 141)	1998 Mar 13 (Saros 142)	2009 Feb 09 (Saros 143)
2020 Jan 10 (Saros 144)	2030 Dec 09 (Saros 145)	2041 Nov 08 (Saros 146)	2052 Oct 08 (Saros 147)	2063 Sep 07 (Saros 148)
2074 Aug 07 (Saros 149)	2085 Jul 07 (Saros 150)	2096 Jun 06 (Saros 151)	2107 May 07 (Saros 152)	
		2151 Jan 02 (Saros 156)		2172 Oct 31 (Saros 158)
2183 Oct 01 (Saros 159)

=== Inex series ===
This eclipse is a part of the long period inex cycle, repeating at alternating nodes, every 358 synodic months (≈ 10,571.95 days, or 29 years minus 20 days). Their appearance and longitude are irregular due to a lack of synchronization with the anomalistic month (period of perigee). However, groupings of 3 inex cycles (≈ 87 years minus 2 months) comes close (≈ 1,151.02 anomalistic months), so eclipses are similar in these groupings.

Series members between 1801 and 2200
1817 Nov 23 (Saros 142)	1846 Nov 03 (Saros 143)	1875 Oct 14 (Saros 144)
1904 Sep 24 (Saros 145)	1933 Sep 04 (Saros 146)	1962 Aug 15 (Saros 147)
1991 Jul 26 (Saros 148)	2020 Jul 05 (Saros 149)	2049 Jun 15 (Saros 150)
	2107 May 07 (Saros 152)	2136 Apr 16 (Saros 153)
	2194 Mar 07 (Saros 155)	

== See also ==
- List of lunar eclipses
- List of 22nd-century lunar eclipses
