= Solar Saros 109 =

Saros cycle series 109 for solar eclipses

Historic saros cycle animation

Saros cycle series 109 for solar eclipses occurred at the Moon's ascending node, repeating every 18 years and 11 days. It contained 81 eclipses, 43 of which were umbral (24 total, 15 hybrid, 4 annular). The first eclipse occurred on 7 September 416 and the last eclipse occurred on 3 February 1859. The longest totality was 5 minutes 46 seconds on 29 July 957 and the longest annular was 2 minutes 5 seconds on 21 July 1552.

This solar saros is linked to Lunar Saros 102.

== Umbral eclipses ==
Umbral eclipses (annular, total and hybrid) can be further classified as either: 1) Central (two limits), 2) Central (one limit) or 3) Non-Central (one limit). The statistical distribution of these classes in Saros series 109 appears in the following table.

Classification	Number	Percent
All Umbral eclipses	43	100.00%
Central (two limits)	41	95.35%
Central (one limit)	2	4.65%
Non-central (one limit)	0	0.00%

== All eclipses ==
Note: Dates are given in the Julian calendar prior to 15 October 1582, and in the Gregorian calendar after that.

Saros	Member	Date	Time (Greatest) UTC	Type	Location Lat, Long	Gamma	Mag.	Width (km)	Duration (min:sec)	Ref
109	1	September 7, 416	13:26:34	Partial	71.6N 112.1E	1.5077	0.0637	-	-	
109	2	September 18, 434	21:26:54	Partial	71.9N 22.7W	1.4688	0.1352	-	-	
109	3	September 29, 452	05:36:43	Partial	71.8N 106.1W	1.4369	0.1938	-	-	
109	4	October 10, 470	13:54:40	Partial	71.5N 60.6E	1.4111	0.2412	-	-	
109	5	October 20, 488	22:21:52	Partial	71.0N 80.5W	1.3921	0.2761	-	-	
109	6	November 1, 506	06:55:05	Partial	70.3N 137.2E	1.3780	0.3019	-	-	
109	7	November 11, 524	15:34:10	Partial	69.4N 5.9W	1.3680	0.3201	-	-	
109	8	November 23, 542	00:17:37	Partial	68.4N 149.3W	1.3612	0.3325	-	-	
109	9	December 3, 560	09:04:10	Partial	67.3N 67.0E	1.3564	0.3411	-	-	
109	10	December 14, 578	17:51:31	Partial	66.2N 76.2W	1.3521	0.3488	-	-	
109	11	December 25, 596	02:38:01	Partial	65.2N 141.2E	1.3467	0.3584	-	-	
109	12	January 5, 615	11:22:56	Partial	64.2N 0.6W	1.3397	0.3712	-	-	
109	13	January 15, 633	20:04:43	Partial	63.3N 141.2W	1.3295	0.3897	-	-	
109	14	January 27, 651	04:40:40	Partial	62.5N 79.9E	1.3144	0.4175	-	-	
109	15	February 6, 669	13:11:22	Partial	61.9N 57.5W	1.2949	0.4541	-	-	
109	16	February 17, 687	21:34:47	Partial	61.4N 167.1E	1.2691	0.5026	-	-	
109	17	February 28, 705	05:52:06	Partial	61.1N 33.3E	1.2380	0.5617	-	-	
109	18	March 11, 723	14:00:20	Partial	60.9N 98.1W	1.1992	0.6358	-	-	
109	19	March 21, 741	22:02:37	Partial	60.9N 132.0E	1.1553	0.7203	-	-	
109	20	April 2, 759	05:56:17	Partial	61.0N 4.2E	1.1044	0.8190	-	-	
109	21	April 12, 777	13:44:14	Partial	61.3N 122.2W	1.0485	0.9279	-	-	
109	22	April 23, 795	21:24:56	Total (Note: One limit)	65.2N 130.7E	0.9863	1.0587	-	2m 58s	
109	23	May 4, 813	05:01:53	Total	68.6N 43.5E	0.9209	1.0659	256	3m 34s	
109	24	May 15, 831	12:34:04	Total	69.6N 50.4W	0.8514	1.0705	439	4m 0s	
109	25	May 25, 849	20:03:24	Total	69.0N 145.3W	0.7794	1.0738	383	4m 22s	
109	26	June 6, 867	03:30:59	Total	66.6N 117.5E	0.7058	1.0760	349	4m 43s	
109	27	June 16, 885	10:58:05	Total	62.6N 16.4E	0.6320	1.0772	323	5m 2s	
109	28	June 27, 903	18:26:02	Total	57.4N 88.8W	0.5585	1.0773	302	5m 18s	
109	29	July 8, 921	01:55:03	Total	51.4N 162.7E	0.4862	1.0763	284	5m 32s	
109	30	July 19, 939	09:27:56	Total	44.9N 51.1E	0.4172	1.0748	267	5m 42s	
109	31	July 29, 957	17:04:35	Total	38.0N 63.0W	0.3518	1.0723	251	5m 46s	
109	32	August 10, 975	00:46:07	Total	31.0N 179.2W	0.2907	1.0692	236	5m 45s	
109	33	August 20, 993	08:33:40	Total	24.0N 62.4E	0.2350	1.0654	220	5m 37s	
109	34	August 31, 1011	16:27:51	Total	17.1N 58.0W	0.1851	1.0612	204	5m 25s	
109	35	September 11, 1029	00:29:28	Total	10.4N 179.6E	0.1422	1.0519	189	5m 7s	
109	36	September 22, 1047	08:36:53	Total	4.0N 55.8E	0.1046	1.0519	173	4m 47 s	
109	37	October 2, 1065	16:52:55	Total	2.0S 69.9W	0.0747	1.0471	157	4m 24 s	
109	38	October 14, 1083	01:15:15	Total	7.4S 163.1E	0.0503	1.0424	142	4m 0 s	
109	39	October 24, 1101	09:45:16	Total	12.3S 34.7E	.0328	1.0378	127	3m 37s	
109	40	November 4, 1119	18:19:38	Total	16.4S 94.2W	.0194	1.0336	113	3m 14s	
109	41	November 15, 1137	03:00:21	Total	19.6S 135.7E	.0116	1.0297	101	2m 53s	
109	42	November 26, 1155	11:43:38	Total	21.9S 5.5E	.0063	1.0262	89	2m 34s	
109	43	December 6, 1173	20:29:30	Total	23.2S 125.0W	.0034	1.0234	80	2m 17s	
109	44	December 18, 1191	05:15:22	Total	23.6S 104.7E	.0008	1.0209	71	2m 2s	
109	45	December 28, 1209	14:00:54	Total	23.0S 25.5W	-0.0018	1.0190	65	1m 50s	
109	46	January 8, 1228	22:42:54	Hybrid (Note: Began annular and ended total)	21.6S 155.1W	-.0068	1.0176	60	1m 40s	
109	47	January 19, 1246	07:20:33	Hybrid	19.6S 76.3E	-0.0150	1.0166	57	1m 34 s	
109	48	January 30, 1264	15:52:26	Hybrid	17.1S 51.2W	-.0276	1.0159	55	1m 29s	
109	49	February 10, 1282	00:17:59	Hybrid	14.3S 177.3W	-0.0451	1.0156	54	1m 26s	
109	50	February 21, 1300	08:34:00	Hybrid	11.5S 58.8E	-0.0698	1.0154	53	1m 24 s	
109	51	March 3, 1318	16:42:11	Hybrid	8.8S 63.2W	-0.1003	1.0153	53	1m 24 s	
109	52	March 14, 1336	00:40:15	Hybrid	6.4S 177.4E	-0.1386	1.0152	52	1m 23s	
109	53	March 25, 1354	08:30:21	Hybrid	4.4S 60.0E	-0.1829	1.0149	52	1m 23 s	
109	54	April 4, 1372	16:09:02	Hybrid	3.1S 54.4W	-0.2359	1.0143	50	1m 22s	
109	55	April 15, 1390	23:40:36	Hybrid	2.7S 167.0W	-0.2940	1.0133	48	1m 19 s	
109	56	April 26, 1408	07:02:10	Hybrid	3.3S 82.8E	-0.3595	1.0119	44	1m 13s	
109	57	May 7, 1426	14:17:32	Hybrid	5.0S 26.0W	-0.4294	1.0100	38	1m 3s	
109	58	May 17, 1444	21:24:41	Hybrid	8.1S 133.0W	-0.5052	1.0074	29	0m 48s	
109	59	May 29, 1462	04:28:02	Hybrid	12.4S 120.4E	-0.5833	1.0042	18	0m 28s	
109	60	June 8, 1480	11:26:08	Hybrid	18.0S 14.4E	-0.6644	1.0002	1	0m 2s	
109	61	June 19, 1498	18:21:38	Annular	25.1S 91.8W	-0.7466	0.9956	23	0m 29s	
109	62	June 30, 1516	01:15:15	Annular	33.8W 161.3E	-0.8291	0.9899	64	1m 3s	
109	63	July 11, 1534	08:08:46	Annular	44.9S 52.5E	-0.9104	0.9833	144	1m 35s	
109	64	July 21, 1552	15:03:48	Annular	62.9S 64.6W	-0.9893	0.9742	-	2m 5s	
109	65	August 1, 1570	22:00:22	Partial	70.4S 171.9E	-1.0655	0.8623	-	-	
109	66	August 22, 1588	05:01:47	Partial	71.1S 53.5E	-1.1364	0.7355	-	-	
109	67	September 2, 1606	12:07:23	Partial	71.7S 66.5W	-1.2026	0.6182	-	-	
109	68	September 12, 1624	19:19:26	Partial	72.0S 171.5E	-1.2625	0.5133	-	-	
109	69	September 24, 1642	02:37:37	Partial	72.1S 47.6E	-1.3163	0.4199	-	-	
109	70	October 4, 1660	10:03:43	Partial	72.0S 78.2W	-1.3629	0.3401	-	-	
109	71	October 15, 1678	17:36:58	Partial	71.6S 154.5E	-1.4027	0.2730	-	-	
109	72	October 26, 1696	01:17:07	Partial	70.9S 25.9E	-1.4361	0.2172	-	-	
109	73	November 7, 1714	09:04:34	Partial	70.1S 103.9W	-1.4630	0.1730	-	-	
109	74	November 17, 1732	16:58:51	Partial	69.2S 125.3E	-1.4841	0.13.89	-	-	
109	75	November 29, 1750	00:58:14	Partial	68.2S 6.2W	-1.5004	0.1129	-	-	
109	76	December 9, 1768	09:01:39	Partial	67.1S 138.1W	-1.5129	0.0932	-	-	
109	77	December 20, 1786	17:07:24	Partial	66.0S 89.9E	-1.5232	0.0772	-	-	
109	78	January 1, 1805	01:14:57	Partial	65.0S 42.1W	-1.5315	.0642	-	-	
109	79	January 12, 1823	09:20:12	Partial	64.0S 173.0W	-1.5413	0.0484	-	-	
109	80	January 22, 1841	17:24:15	Partial	63.1S 56.6E	-1.5516	0.0316	-	-	
109	81	February 3, 1859	01:22:42	Partial	62.4S 72.1W	-1.5659	0.0077	-	-	
