= Lunar Saros 155 =

Eclipse cycle of the moon

Saros cycle series 155 for lunar eclipses occurs at the moon's descending node, repeats every 18 years 11 and 1/3 days. It contains 73 events.

This lunar saros is linked to Solar Saros 162.

| Cat. | Saros | Mem | Date | Time UT (hr:mn) | Type | Gamma | Magnitude | Duration (min) | | | Contacts UT (hr:mn) | | | | | | Chart |
| Cat. | Saros | Mem | Date | Greatest | Type | Gamma | Magnitude | Pen. | Par. | Tot. | P1 | P4 | U1 | U2 | U3 | U4 | Chart |
|---|---|---|---|---|---|---|---|---|---|---|---|---|---|---|---|---|---|
| 10145 | 155 | 1 | 2212 Mar 18 | 9:06:46 | Penumbral | -1.5477 | -0.9998 | 55.5 | | | 8:39:01 | 9:34:31 | | | | | |
| 10189 | 155 | 2 | 2230 Mar 29 | 16:58:24 | Penumbral | -1.5105 | -0.9285 | 91.9 | | | 16:12:27 | 17:44:21 | | | | | |
| 10234 | 155 | 3 | 2248 Apr 09 | 0:42:30 | Penumbral | -1.4664 | -0.8443 | 120.9 | | | 23:42:03 | 1:42:57 | | | | | |
| 10280 | 155 | 4 | 2266 Apr 20 | 8:20:18 | Penumbral | -1.4163 | -0.7494 | 145.9 | | | 7:07:21 | 9:33:15 | | | | | |
| 10326 | 155 | 5 | 2284 Apr 30 | 15:51:43 | Penumbral | -1.3601 | -0.6431 | 168.7 | | | 14:27:22 | 17:16:04 | | | | | |
| 10372 | 155 | 6 | 2302 May 12 | 23:17:54 | Penumbral | -1.2986 | -0.5273 | 189.4 | | | 21:43:12 | 0:52:36 | | | | | |
| 10418 | 155 | 7 | 2320 May 23 | 6:38:12 | Penumbral | -1.2312 | -0.4008 | 208.6 | | | 4:53:54 | 8:22:30 | | | | | |
| 10464 | 155 | 8 | 2338 Jun 03 | 13:55:27 | Penumbral | -1.1602 | -0.2680 | 225.8 | | | 12:02:33 | 15:48:21 | | | | | |
| 10510 | 155 | 9 | 2356 Jun 13 | 21:09:23 | Penumbral | -1.0858 | -0.1291 | 241.4 | | | 19:08:41 | 23:10:05 | | | | | |
| 10555 | 155 | 10 | 2374 Jun 25 | 4:21:36 | Partial | -1.0090 | 0.0140 | 255.3 | 26.9 | | 2:13:57 | 6:29:15 | 4:08:09 | | | 4:35:03 | |
| 10599 | 155 | 11 | 2392 Jul 05 | 11:33:11 | Partial | -0.9306 | 0.1598 | 267.6 | 88.7 | | 9:19:23 | 13:46:59 | 10:48:50 | | | 12:17:32 | |
| 10644 | 155 | 12 | 2410 Jul 16 | 18:45:58 | Partial | -0.8523 | 0.3050 | 278.2 | 119.7 | | 16:26:52 | 21:05:04 | 17:46:07 | | | 19:45:49 | |
| 10688 | 155 | 13 | 2428 Jul 27 | 2:01:20 | Partial | -0.7754 | 0.4474 | 287.2 | 141.5 | | 23:37:44 | 4:24:56 | 0:50:35 | | | 3:12:05 | |
| 10732 | 155 | 14 | 2446 Aug 07 | 9:19:05 | Partial | -0.6995 | 0.5875 | 294.9 | 158.2 | | 6:51:38 | 11:46:32 | 7:59:59 | | | 10:38:11 | |
| 10775 | 155 | 15 | 2464 Aug 17 | 16:42:26 | Partial | -0.6277 | 0.7201 | 301.2 | 170.9 | | 14:11:50 | 19:13:02 | 15:16:59 | | | 18:07:53 | |
| 10817 | 155 | 16 | 2482 Aug 29 | 0:10:16 | Partial | -0.5588 | 0.8468 | 306.3 | 180.9 | | 21:37:07 | 2:43:25 | 22:39:49 | | | 1:40:43 | |
| 10858 | 155 | 17 | 2500 Sep 09 | 7:45:59 | Partial | -0.4957 | 0.9628 | 310.3 | 188.5 | | 5:10:50 | 10:21:08 | 6:11:44 | | | 9:20:14 | |
| 10899 | 155 | 18 | 2518 Sep 20 | 15:27:28 | Total | -0.4370 | 1.0707 | 313.4 | 194.4 | 39.5 | 12:50:46 | 18:04:10 | 13:50:16 | 15:07:43 | 15:47:13 | 17:04:40 | |
| 10939 | 155 | 19 | 2536 Sep 30 | 23:18:44 | Total | -0.3856 | 1.1647 | 315.6 | 198.7 | 58.5 | 20:40:56 | 1:56:32 | 21:39:23 | 22:49:29 | 23:47:59 | 0:58:05 | |
| 10981 | 155 | 20 | 2554 Oct 12 | 7:17:08 | Total | -0.3398 | 1.2485 | 317.3 | 201.9 | 69.7 | 4:38:29 | 9:55:47 | 5:36:11 | 6:42:17 | 7:51:59 | 8:58:05 | |
| 11023 | 155 | 21 | 2572 Oct 22 | 15:24:53 | Total | -0.3012 | 1.3190 | 318.4 | 204.1 | 76.9 | 12:45:41 | 18:04:05 | 13:42:50 | 14:46:26 | 16:03:20 | 17:06:56 | |
| 11063 | 155 | 22 | 2590 Nov 02 | 23:40:12 | Total | -0.2685 | 1.3786 | 319.1 | 205.7 | 81.9 | 21:00:39 | 2:19:45 | 21:57:21 | 22:59:15 | 0:21:09 | 1:23:03 | |
| 11103 | 155 | 23 | 2608 Nov 14 | 8:04:33 | Total | -0.2426 | 1.4256 | 319.5 | 206.7 | 85.1 | 5:24:48 | 10:44:18 | 6:21:12 | 7:22:00 | 8:47:06 | 9:47:54 | |
| 11143 | 155 | 24 | 2626 Nov 25 | 16:35:27 | Total | -0.2223 | 1.4626 | 319.7 | 207.3 | 87.3 | 13:55:36 | 19:15:18 | 14:51:48 | 15:51:48 | 17:19:06 | 18:19:06 | |
| 11184 | 155 | 25 | 2644 Dec 06 | 1:12:54 | Total | -0.2069 | 1.4906 | 319.7 | 207.6 | 88.8 | 22:33:03 | 3:52:45 | 23:29:06 | 0:28:30 | 1:57:18 | 2:56:42 | |
| 11225 | 155 | 26 | 2662 Dec 17 | 9:55:29 | Total | -0.1956 | 1.5111 | 319.6 | 207.8 | 89.8 | 7:15:41 | 12:35:17 | 8:11:35 | 9:10:35 | 10:40:23 | 11:39:23 | |
| 11268 | 155 | 27 | 2680 Dec 27 | 18:43:05 | Total | -0.1879 | 1.5253 | 319.4 | 207.9 | 90.4 | 16:03:23 | 21:22:47 | 16:59:08 | 17:57:53 | 19:28:17 | 20:27:02 | |
| 11310 | 155 | 28 | 2699 Jan 08 | 3:32:27 | Total | -0.1816 | 1.5371 | 319.2 | 207.9 | 90.8 | 0:52:51 | 6:12:03 | 1:48:30 | 2:47:03 | 4:17:51 | 5:16:24 | |
| 11353 | 155 | 29 | 2717 Jan 19 | 12:23:43 | Total | -0.1768 | 1.5464 | 318.9 | 207.9 | 91.2 | 9:44:16 | 15:03:10 | 10:39:46 | 11:38:07 | 13:09:19 | 14:07:40 | |
| 11395 | 155 | 30 | 2735 Jan 30 | 21:13:45 | Total | -0.1706 | 1.5584 | 318.6 | 208.0 | 91.7 | 18:34:27 | 23:53:03 | 19:29:45 | 20:27:54 | 21:59:36 | 22:57:45 | |
| 11438 | 155 | 31 | 2753 Feb 10 | 6:03:22 | Total | -0.1639 | 1.5715 | 318.4 | 208.1 | 92.2 | 3:24:10 | 8:42:34 | 4:19:19 | 5:17:16 | 6:49:28 | 7:47:25 | |
| 11483 | 155 | 32 | 2771 Feb 21 | 14:47:55 | Total | -0.1527 | 1.5931 | 318.2 | 208.4 | 93.1 | 12:08:49 | 17:27:01 | 13:03:43 | 14:01:22 | 15:34:28 | 16:32:07 | |
| 11528 | 155 | 33 | 2789 Mar 03 | 23:29:51 | Total | -0.1391 | 1.6193 | 318.1 | 208.8 | 94.1 | 20:50:48 | 2:08:54 | 21:45:27 | 22:42:48 | 0:16:54 | 1:14:15 | |
| 11574 | 155 | 34 | 2807 Mar 15 | 8:04:45 | Total | -0.1195 | 1.6566 | 318.1 | 209.3 | 95.3 | 5:25:42 | 10:43:48 | 6:20:06 | 7:17:06 | 8:52:24 | 9:49:24 | |
| 11621 | 155 | 35 | 2825 Mar 25 | 16:34:39 | Total | -0.0956 | 1.7017 | 318.1 | 209.9 | 96.5 | 13:55:36 | 19:13:42 | 14:49:42 | 15:46:24 | 17:22:54 | 18:19:36 | |
| 11668 | 155 | 36 | 2843 Apr 06 | 0:55:44 | Total | -0.0642 | 1.7608 | 318.2 | 210.5 | 97.7 | 22:16:38 | 3:34:50 | 23:10:29 | 0:06:53 | 1:44:35 | 2:40:59 | |
| 11714 | 155 | 37 | 2861 Apr 16 | 9:11:05 | Total | -0.0280 | 1.8286 | 318.2 | 210.9 | 98.6 | 6:31:59 | 11:50:11 | 7:25:38 | 8:21:47 | 10:00:23 | 10:56:32 | |
| 11760 | 155 | 38 | 2879 Apr 27 | 17:18:01 | Total | 0.0154 | 1.8529 | 318.0 | 211.1 | 98.8 | 14:39:01 | 19:57:01 | 15:32:28 | 16:28:37 | 18:07:25 | 19:03:34 | |
| 11806 | 155 | 39 | 2897 May 8 | 1:17:49 | Total | 0.0647 | 1.7636 | 317.6 | 210.8 | 98.1 | 22:39:01 | 3:56:37 | 23:32:25 | 0:28:46 | 2:06:52 | 3:03:13 | |
| 11851 | 155 | 40 | 2915 May 20 | 9:10:06 | Total | 0.1200 | 1.6631 | 317.0 | 210.0 | 96.0 | 6:31:36 | 11:48:36 | 7:25:06 | 8:22:06 | 9:58:06 | 10:55:06 | |
| 11896 | 155 | 41 | 2933 May 30 | 16:56:40 | Total | 0.1800 | 1.5539 | 315.8 | 208.4 | 92.1 | 14:18:46 | 19:34:34 | 15:12:28 | 16:10:37 | 17:42:43 | 18:40:52 | |
| 11941 | 155 | 42 | 2951 Jun 11 | 0:37:15 | Total | 0.2448 | 1.4354 | 314.1 | 205.7 | 85.7 | 22:00:12 | 3:14:18 | 22:54:24 | 23:54:24 | 1:20:06 | 2:20:06 | |
| 11988 | 155 | 43 | 2969 Jun 21 | 8:12:26 | Total | 0.3140 | 1.3088 | 311.8 | 201.9 | 75.6 | 5:36:32 | 10:48:20 | 6:31:29 | 7:34:38 | 8:50:14 | 9:53:23 | |
| 12032 | 155 | 44 | 2987 Jul 02 | 15:44:11 | Total | 0.3856 | 1.1772 | 308.7 | 196.8 | 59.8 | 13:09:50 | 18:18:32 | 14:05:47 | 15:14:17 | 16:14:05 | 17:22:35 | |
| | 155 | 45 | 3005 Jul 13 | 23:13:22 | Total | 0.4589 | 1.0424 | 304.8 | 190.2 | 30.5 | | | | | | | |
| | 155 | 46 | 3023 Jul 25 | 06:40:39 | Partial | 0.5335 | 0.9049 | 300.1 | 181.9 | | | | | | | | |
| | 155 | 47 | 3041 Aug 04 | 14:07:39 | Partial | 0.6081 | 0.7672 | 294.7 | 171.7 | | | | | | | | |
| | 155 | 48 | 3059 Aug 15 | 21:35:48 | Partial | 0.6812 | 0.6318 | 288.4 | 159.5 | | | | | | | | |
| | 155 | 49 | 3077 Aug 26 | 05:06:33 | Partial | 0.7515 | 0.5012 | 281.6 | 145.3 | | | | | | | | |
| | 155 | 50 | 3095 Sep 06 | 12:39:07 | Partial | 0.8199 | 0.3739 | 274.1 | 128.2 | | | | | | | | |
| | 155 | 51 | 3113 Sep 17 | 20:16:45 | Partial | 0.8834 | 0.2553 | 266.3 | 108.0 | | | | | | | | |
| | 155 | 52 | 3131 Sep 29 | 03:58:39 | Partial | 0.9430 | 0.1438 | 258.2 | 82.5 | | | | | | | | |
| | 155 | 53 | 3149 Oct 09 | 11:47:09 | Partial | 0.9965 | 0.0432 | 250.2 | 45.9 | | | | | | | | |
| | 155 | 54 | 3167 Oct 20 | 19:40:44 | Penumbral | 1.0452 | -0.0488 | 242.4 | | | | | | | | | |
| | 155 | 55 | 3185 Oct 31 | 03:42:04 | Penumbral | 1.0870 | -0.1280 | 235.1 | | | | | | | | | |
| | 155 | 56 | 3203 Nov 11 | 11:49:47 | Penumbral | 1.1230 | -0.1968 | 228.5 | | | | | | | | | |

== See also ==
- List of lunar eclipses
  - List of Saros series for lunar eclipses
