= Solar Saros 113 =

Saros cycle series 113 for solar eclipses

Historic saros cycle animation

Saros cycle series 113 for solar eclipses occurred at the Moon's ascending node, repeating every 18 years, 11 days, contained 71 eclipses, 40 of which were umbral, all annular. The first eclipse was on 22 July 586 and the last was on 28 August 1848. The eclipse with the longest duration was 9 minutes 32 seconds on 20 November 1397.

This solar saros is linked to Lunar Saros 106.

== Umbral eclipses ==
Umbral eclipses (annular, total and hybrid) can be further classified as either: 1) Central (two limits), 2) Central (one limit) or 3) Non-Central (one limit). The statistical distribution of these classes in Saros series 113 appears in the following table.

Classification	Number	Percent
All Umbral eclipses	40	100.00%
Central (two limits)	40	100.00%
Central (one limit)	0	0.00%
Non-central (one limit)	0	0.00%

== All eclipses ==
Note: Dates are given in the Julian calendar prior to 15 October 1582, and in the Gregorian calendar after that.

Saros	Member	Date	Time (Greatest) UTC	Type	Location Lat, Long	Gamma	Mag.	Width (km)	Duration (min:sec)	Ref
113	1	July 22, 586	1:07:19	Partial	68.6N 15.5W	1.488	0.0869			
113	2	August 1, 604	8:37:51	Partial	69.5N 140.7W	1.4301	0.1981			
113	3	August 12, 622	16:12:43	Partial	70.3N 92.4E	1.3763	0.3006			
113	4	August 22, 640	23:54:28	Partial	71N 36.8W	1.3287	0.3906			
113	5	September 3, 658	7:42:11	Partial	71.5N 167.9W	1.2866	0.4693			
113	6	September 13, 676	15:37:12	Partial	71.8N 58.7E	1.2509	0.5352			
113	7	September 24, 694	23:39:10	Partial	71.8N 76.6W	1.2216	0.5889			
113	8	October 5, 712	7:48:54	Partial	71.6N 146.2E	1.1989	0.6297			
113	9	October 16, 730	16:04:50	Partial	71.2N 7.8E	1.1824	0.659			
113	10	October 27, 748	0:26:16	Partial	70.5N 131.5W	1.1709	0.6789			
113	11	November 7, 766	8:52:52	Partial	69.6N 88.5E	1.1644	0.6897			
113	12	November 17, 784	17:23:51	Partial	68.7N 52W	1.1619	0.6934			
113	13	November 29, 802	1:56:35	Partial	67.6N 167.8E	1.1616	0.6933			
113	14	December 9, 820	10:30:28	Partial	66.5N 27.9E	1.1629	0.6904			
113	15	December 20, 838	19:02:58	Partial	65.5N 111.2W	1.1638	0.6885			
113	16	December 31, 856	3:34:01	Partial	64.5N 110.5E	1.1642	0.6875			
113	17	January 11, 875	11:59:11	Partial	63.6N 25.9W	1.1603	0.6941			
113	18	January 21, 893	20:20:19	Partial	62.8N 161W	1.1538	0.7054			
113	19	February 2, 911	4:32:54	Partial	62.1N 66.3E	1.141	0.7279			
113	20	February 12, 929	12:38:40	Partial	61.5N 64.5W	1.1233	0.759			
113	21	February 23, 947	20:33:12	Partial	61.2N 167.6E	1.0972	0.8049			
113	22	March 6, 965	4:19:59	Partial	60.9N 41.8E	1.0655	0.8607			
113	23	March 17, 983	11:55:18	Partial	60.9N 81.1W	1.0251	0.9317			
113	24	March 27, 1001	19:20:56	Annular	61.1N 178W	0.9775	0.9637	642	2m 26s	
113	25	April 8, 1019	2:36:00	Annular	60.6N 87.3E	0.9222	0.9663	311	2m 23s	
113	26	April 18, 1037	9:42:40	Annular	60.7N 9.9W	0.8607	0.9679	225	2m 21s	
113	27	April 29, 1055	16:40:32	Annular	60.8N 105.2W	0.7927	0.9687	183	2m 22s	
113	28	May 9, 1073	23:30:35	Annular	60.3N 161.7E	0.7189	0.969	160	2m 27s	
113	29	May 21, 1091	6:14:32	Annular	58.7N 69.9E	0.6408	0.9687	146	2m 37s	
113	30	May 31, 1109	12:53:47	Annular	55.9N 21.8W	0.5596	0.9678	140	2m 51s	
113	31	June 11, 1127	19:28:58	Annular	51.8N 114.2W	0.4756	0.9664	138	3m 10s	
113	32	June 22, 1145	2:02:44	Annular	46.6N 151.7E	0.3909	0.9645	140	3m 35s	
113	33	July 3, 1163	8:36:04	Annular	40.5N 55.9E	0.3064	0.962	145	4m 6s	
113	34	July 13, 1181	15:11:38	Annular	33.9N 42W	0.2244	0.959	153	4m 42s	
113	35	July 24, 1199	21:48:31	Annular	26.8N 141.4W	0.1439	0.9557	163	5m 21s	
113	36	August 4, 1217	4:30:50	Annular	19.4N 117E	0.0686	0.952	176	6m 1s	
113	37	August 15, 1235	11:17:23	Annular	11.9N 13.7E	-0.0027	0.9481	191	6m 40s	
113	38	August 25, 1253	18:11:53	Annular	4.4N 91.8W	-0.0671	0.944	207	7m 16s	
113	39	September 6, 1271	1:12:00	Annular	3S 161E	-0.1263	0.9398	225	7m 48s	
113	40	September 16, 1289	8:22:02	Annular	10.1S 51.5E	-0.1768	0.9357	243	8m 15s	
113	41	September 27, 1307	15:39:04	Annular	16.9S 59.6W	-0.2211	0.9317	261	8m 39s	
113	42	October 7, 1325	23:05:32	Annular	23.2S 172.5W	-0.2574	0.9281	279	8m 57s	
113	43	October 19, 1343	6:39:25	Annular	29S 73.3E	-0.2873	0.9247	296	9m 12s	
113	44	October 29, 1361	14:21:52	Annular	34.1S 42.1W	-0.3101	0.9219	310	9m 22s	
113	45	November 9, 1379	22:10:29	Annular	38.3S 158W	-0.3275	0.9195	323	9m 29s	
113	46	November 20, 1397	6:04:18	Annular	41.6S 85.7E	-0.3407	0.9178	333	9m 32s	
113	47	December 1, 1415	14:02:32	Annular	43.7S 30.7W	-0.3503	0.9166	339	9m 31s	
113	48	December 11, 1433	22:03:44	Annular	44.6S 147.3W	-0.3579	0.9162	342	9m 25s	
113	49	December 23, 1451	6:05:20	Annular	44.3S 96E	-0.3651	0.9164	342	9m 16s	
113	50	January 2, 1470	14:05:56	Annular	43.1S 20.7W	-0.3733	0.9173	339	9m 2s	
113	51	January 13, 1488	22:03:45	Annular	41S 137.4W	-0.384	0.9188	333	8m 45s	
113	52	January 24, 1506	5:58:07	Annular	38.3S 106.1E	-0.3979	0.9209	325	8m 26s	
113	53	February 4, 1524	13:45:35	Annular	35.4S 9.3W	-0.4176	0.9235	315	8m 5s	
113	54	February 14, 1542	21:27:23	Annular	32.5S 123.8W	-0.4424	0.9265	305	7m 44s	
113	55	February 26, 1560	5:00:44	Annular	29.9S 123.5E	-0.4741	0.9299	294	7m 22s	
113	56	March 8, 1578	12:26:52	Annular	27.7S 12.3E	-0.512	0.9336	284	7m 1s	
113	57	March 28, 1596	19:43:19	Annular	26.3S 96.5W	-0.5583	0.9373	275	6m 42s	
113	58	April 9, 1614	2:52:58	Annular	25.7S 156.2E	-0.6103	0.9411	268	6m 22s	
113	59	April 19, 1632	9:54:30	Annular	26.4S 50.8E	-0.6694	0.9447	267	6m 3s	
113	60	April 30, 1650	16:48:49	Annular	28.5S 52.9W	-0.7347	0.9481	274	5m 43s	
113	61	May 10, 1668	23:37:24	Annular	32.3S 155.4W	-0.8049	0.951	296	5m 21s	
113	62	May 22, 1686	6:21:20	Annular	38.6S 103.3E	-0.8791	0.9533	353	4m 56s	
113	63	June 2, 1704	13:02:36	Annular	49.1S 3.4E	-0.9561	0.9542	578	4m 26s	
113	64	June 13, 1722	19:40:19	Partial	65.2S 93.5W	-1.0364	0.9083			
113	65	June 24, 1740	2:18:54	Partial	66.2S 156.7E	-1.1163	0.7697			
113	66	July 5, 1758	8:57:44	Partial	67.2S 46.4E	-1.1961	0.6302			
113	67	July 15, 1776	15:39:29	Partial	68.2S 65.1W	-1.2739	0.4935			
113	68	July 26, 1794	22:24:27	Partial	69.1S 178W	-1.3496	0.3599			
113	69	August 7, 1812	5:15:50	Partial	70S 67E	-1.4205	0.2343			
113	70	August 18, 1830	12:13:35	Partial	70.7S 50.2W	-1.4866	0.1171			
113	71	August 28, 1848	19:18:22	Partial	71.3S 169.6W	-1.5475	0.009			
