= Solar Saros 160 =

Saros cycle series 160 for solar eclipses

Saros cycle series 160 for solar eclipses will occur at the Moon's descending node, repeating every 18 years, 11 days, containing 71 eclipses, 45 of which will be umbral (20 annular, 3 hybrid, 22 total). The first eclipse in the series will be on 13 May 2181 and the last eclipse will be on 20 June 3443.

The longest totality will be 4 minutes 59 seconds on 3 July 2866 and the longest annular will be 3 minutes 37 seconds on 30 July 2307.

This solar saros is linked to Lunar Saros 153.

== Umbral eclipses ==
Umbral eclipses (annular, total and hybrid) can be further classified as either: 1) Central (two limits), 2) Central (one limit) or 3) Non-Central (one limit). The statistical distribution of these classes in Saros series 160 appears in the following table.

| Classification | Number | Percent |
|---|---|---|
| All Umbral eclipses | 45 | 100.00% |
| Central (two limits) | 44 | 97.78% |
| Central (one limit) | 0 | 0.00% |
| Non-central (one limit) | 1 | 2.22% |

== All eclipses ==
| Saros | Member | Date | Time (Greatest) UTC | Type | Location Lat, Long | Gamma | Mag. | Width (km) | Duration (min:sec) | Ref |
|---|---|---|---|---|---|---|---|---|---|---|
| 160 | 1 | May 13, 2181 | 14:55:43 | Partial | 69.4S 16.9W | -1.5323 | 0.051 | | | |
| 160 | 2 | May 24, 2199 | 21:42:07 | Partial | 68.5S 130.1W | -1.4596 | 0.1742 | | | |
| 160 | 3 | June 5, 2217 | 4:22:21 | Partial | 67.5S 118.9E | -1.3807 | 0.3094 | | | |
| 160 | 4 | June 16, 2235 | 11:00:36 | Partial | 66.5S 8.8E | -1.299 | 0.4502 | | | |
| 160 | 5 | June 26, 2253 | 17:36:11 | Partial | 65.5S 100.1W | -1.2139 | 0.5981 | | | |
| 160 | 6 | July 8, 2271 | 0:13:02 | Partial | 64.5S 151.1E | -1.1284 | 0.7474 | | | |
| 160 | 7 | July 18, 2289 | 6:50:58 | Partial | 63.6S 42.3E | -1.0426 | 0.898 | | | |
| 160 | 8 | July 30, 2307 | 13:31:16 | Annular | 50S 48.7W | -0.9574 | 0.9602 | 501 | 3m 37s | |
| 160 | 9 | August 9, 2325 | 20:16:24 | Annular | 40.3S 146.1W | -0.8749 | 0.9648 | 256 | 3m 24s | |
| 160 | 10 | August 21, 2343 | 3:07:05 | Annular | 35.1S 112.8E | -0.7957 | 0.9679 | 186 | 3m 9s | |
| 160 | 11 | August 31, 2361 | 10:04:30 | Annular | 32.2S 9.7E | -0.7211 | 0.9701 | 151 | 2m 54s | |
| 160 | 12 | September 11, 2379 | 17:09:32 | Annular | 30.9S 95.4W | -0.6518 | 0.9717 | 130 | 2m 42s | |
| 160 | 13 | September 22, 2397 | 0:23:55 | Annular | 30.9S 157.2E | -0.5892 | 0.9728 | 118 | 2m 34s | |
| 160 | 14 | October 3, 2415 | 7:47:48 | Annular | 31.8S 47.4E | -0.5335 | 0.9736 | 110 | 2m 27s | |
| 160 | 15 | October 13, 2433 | 15:20:16 | Annular | 33.4S 64.2W | -0.484 | 0.9742 | 104 | 2m 23s | |
| 160 | 16 | October 24, 2451 | 23:03:09 | Annular | 35.3S 178.3W | -0.4424 | 0.9746 | 101 | 2m 21s | |
| 160 | 17 | November 4, 2469 | 6:55:37 | Annular | 37.5S 65.7E | -0.4081 | 0.975 | 97 | 2m 19s | |
| 160 | 18 | November 15, 2487 | 14:57:35 | Annular | 39.5S 52.3W | -0.3807 | 0.9756 | 94 | 2m 16s | |
| 160 | 19 | November 26, 2505 | 23:07:04 | Annular | 41.2S 171.6W | -0.3588 | 0.9763 | 91 | 2m 13s | |
| 160 | 20 | December 8, 2523 | 7:24:54 | Annular | 42.4S 67.5E | -0.3431 | 0.9774 | 86 | 2m 8s | |
| 160 | 21 | December 18, 2541 | 15:48:55 | Annular | 42.8S 54.7W | -0.3319 | 0.9788 | 80 | 2m 1s | |
| 160 | 22 | December 30, 2559 | 0:17:19 | Annular | 42.2S 177.9W | -0.3237 | 0.9808 | 72 | 1m 50s | |
| 160 | 23 | January 9, 2578 | 8:49:00 | Annular | 40.7S 57.7E | -0.3176 | 0.9831 | 63 | 1m 37s | |
| 160 | 24 | January 20, 2596 | 17:22:01 | Annular | 38.3S 67.6W | -0.3119 | 0.9862 | 51 | 1m 20s | |
| 160 | 25 | February 1, 2614 | 1:55:16 | Annular | 35S 166.3E | -0.3058 | 0.9897 | 38 | 1m 0s | |
| 160 | 26 | February 12, 2632 | 10:25:37 | Annular | 30.9S 40.1E | -0.2969 | 0.9938 | 23 | 0m 36s | |
| 160 | 27 | February 22, 2650 | 18:53:59 | Annular | 26.2S 86.4W | -0.2856 | 0.9984 | 6 | 0m 9s | |
| 160 | 28 | March 5, 2668 | 3:17:08 | Hybrid | 21S 147.7E | -0.2697 | 1.0035 | 13 | 0m 21s | |
| 160 | 29 | March 16, 2686 | 11:34:58 | Hybrid | 15.4S 22.6E | -0.2486 | 1.009 | 32 | 0m 54s | |
| 160 | 30 | March 27, 2704 | 19:45:56 | Hybrid | 9.5S 101.1W | -0.2211 | 1.0148 | 52 | 1m 29s | |
| 160 | 31 | April 8, 2722 | 3:51:03 | Total | 3.5S 136.6E | -0.1881 | 1.0208 | 72 | 2m 6s | |
| 160 | 32 | April 18, 2740 | 11:49:23 | Total | 2.7N 15.9E | -0.1487 | 1.0268 | 92 | 2m 43s | |
| 160 | 33 | April 29, 2758 | 19:40:31 | Total | 8.9N 102.7W | -0.1026 | 1.0328 | 111 | 3m 18s | |
| 160 | 34 | May 10, 2776 | 3:25:50 | Total | 14.9N 140.5E | -0.0507 | 1.0386 | 130 | 3m 50s | |
| 160 | 35 | May 21, 2794 | 11:05:18 | Total | 20.7N 25.6E | 0.007 | 1.0441 | 147 | 4m 16s | |
| 160 | 36 | May 31, 2812 | 18:39:58 | Total | 26.2N 87.3W | 0.0694 | 1.0493 | 164 | 4m 36s | |
| 160 | 37 | June 12, 2830 | 2:09:55 | Total | 31.1N 161.8E | 0.1365 | 1.0538 | 180 | 4m 50s | |
| 160 | 38 | June 22, 2848 | 9:37:37 | Total | 35.3N 52.3E | 0.2062 | 1.0578 | 195 | 4m 57s | |
| 160 | 39 | July 3, 2866 | 17:03:16 | Total | 38.7N 55.8W | 0.2785 | 1.061 | 209 | 4m 59s | |
| 160 | 40 | July 14, 2884 | 0:27:39 | Total | 41.3N 162.8W | 0.3523 | 1.0635 | 222 | 4m 58s | |
| 160 | 41 | July 26, 2902 | 7:52:48 | Total | 42.9N 90.4E | 0.426 | 1.0651 | 235 | 4m 54s | |
| 160 | 42 | August 5, 2920 | 15:19:10 | Total | 43.8N 16.6W | 0.4991 | 1.066 | 248 | 4m 48s | |
| 160 | 43 | August 16, 2938 | 22:49:03 | Total | 43.9N 124.7W | 0.5697 | 1.066 | 261 | 4m 42s | |
| 160 | 44 | August 27, 2956 | 6:20:57 | Total | 43.8N 126.2E | 0.6387 | 1.0653 | 274 | 4m 34s | |
| 160 | 45 | September 7, 2974 | 13:59:21 | Total | 43.5N 14.9E | 0.7028 | 1.0638 | 289 | 4m 25s | |
| 160 | 46 | September 17, 2992 | 21:42:08 | Total | 43.5N 98.1W | 0.7636 | 1.0617 | 307 | 4m 16s | |
| 160 | 47 | September 30, 3010 | 05:32:38 | Total | 43.8N 146.3E | 0.8180 | 1.0589 | 330 | 4m 5s | |
| 160 | 48 | October 10, 3028 | 13:28:55 | Total | 44.9N 28.8E | 0.8679 | 1.0556 | 362 | 3m 53s | |
| 160 | 49 | October 21, 3046 | 21:34:28 | Total | 46.7N 91.6W | 0.9104 | 1.0520 | 409 | 3m 38s | |
| 160 | 50 | November 1, 3064 | 05:46:35 | Total | 49.8N 146.2E | 0.9478 | 1.0479 | 497 | 3m 20s | |
| 160 | 51 | November 12, 3082 | 14:06:37 | Total | 54.7N 22.5E | 0.9789 | 1.0433 | 734 | 2m 57s | |
| 160 | 52 | November 23, 3100 | 22:33:38 | Total | 63.6N 98.5W | 1.0045 | 1.0050 | - | - | |
| 160 | 53 | December 5, 3118 | 07:08:23 | Partial | 64.5N 123.9E | 1.0236 | 0.9677 | - | - | |
| 160 | 54 | December 15, 3136 | 15:48:20 | Partial | 65.5N 15.2W | 1.0390 | 0.9376 | - | - | |
| 160 | 55 | December 27, 3154 | 00:33:10 | Partial | 66.5N 156.0W | 1.0503 | 0.9153 | - | - | |
| 160 | 56 | January 6, 3173 | 09:21:40 | Partial | 67.6N 61.8E | 1.0588 | 0.8987 | - | - | |
| 160 | 57 | January 17, 3191 | 18:13:12 | Partial | 68.7N 81.7W | 1.0647 | 0.8871 | - | - | |
| 160 | 58 | January 28, 3209 | 03:04:14 | Partial | 69.7N 134.3E | 1.0711 | 0.8749 | - | - | |
| 160 | 59 | February 8, 3227 | 11:55:28 | Partial | 70.6N 10.4W | 1.0772 | 0.8632 | - | - | |
| 160 | 60 | February 18, 3245 | 20:43:30 | Partial | 71.4N 154.9W | 1.0861 | 0.8465 | - | - | |
| 160 | 61 | March 2, 3263 | 05:29:09 | Partial | 71.9N 60.6E | 1.0969 | 0.8265 | - | - | |
| 160 | 62 | March 12, 3281 | 14:08:09 | Partial | 72.2N 82.6W | 1.1129 | 0.7964 | - | - | |
| 160 | 63 | March 23, 3299 | 22:43:04 | Partial | 72.3N 5.2W | 1.1324 | 0.7600 | - | - | |
| 160 | 64 | April 4, 3317 | 07:09:55 | Partial | 72.0N 5.2W | 1.1584 | 0.7111 | - | - | |
| 160 | 65 | April 15, 3335 | 15:30:11 | Partial | 71.6N 143.4W | 1.1899 | 0.6518 | - | - | |
| 160 | 66 | April 25, 3353 | 23:41:33 | Partial | 70.9N 81.1E | 1.2286 | 0.5786 | - | - | |
| 160 | 67 | May 7, 3371 | 07:46:17 | Partial | 70.1N 52.0W | 1.2726 | 0.4952 | - | - | |
| 160 | 68 | May 17, 3389 | 15:42:38 | Partial | 69.2N 177.6E | 1.3232 | 0.3991 | - | - | |
| 160 | 69 | May 29, 3407 | 23:31:28 | Partial | 68.2N 49.7E | 1.3796 | 0.2919 | - | - | |
| 160 | 70 | June 9, 3425 | 07:13:18 | Partial | 67.2N 76.0W | 1.4414 | 0.1744 | - | - | |
| 160 | 71 | June 20, 3443 | 14:48:56 | Partial | 66.2N 160.5E | 1.5079 | 0.0482 | - | - | |
