= Solar Saros 162 =

Saros cycle series 162 for solar eclipses

Saros cycle series 162 for solar eclipses will occur at the Moon's descending node, repeating every 18 years, 11 days, containing 70 eclipses, 39 of which will be umbral (all annular). The first eclipse will be on 15 April 2257 and the last will be on 10 May 3501.

The longest eclipse will be 10 minutes 4 seconds on 16 February 2762. This solar saros is linked to Lunar Saros 155.

== Umbral eclipses ==
Umbral eclipses (annular, total and hybrid) can be further classified as either: 1) Central (two limits), 2) Central (one limit) or 3) Non-Central (one limit). The statistical distribution of these classes in Saros series 162 appears in the following table.

Classification	Number	Percent
All Umbral eclipses	39	100.00%
Central (two limits)	38	97.44%
Central (one limit)	1	2.56%
Non-central (one limit)	0	0.00%

== All eclipses ==
Saros	Member	Date	Time (Greatest) UTC	Type	Location Lat, Long	Gamma	Mag.	Width (km)	Duration (min:sec)	Ref
162	1	April 15, 2257	12:05:15	Partial	71.3S 60.1E	-1.5121	0.0633			
162	2	April 26, 2275	19:41:41	Partial	70.7S 67W	-1.4684	0.1423			
162	3	May 7, 2293	3:09:47	Partial	69.9S 168.5E	-1.4186	0.2323			
162	4	May 19, 2311	10:28:46	Partial	69S 46.9E	-1.362	0.3345			
162	5	May 29, 2329	17:41:09	Partial	68.1S 72.5W	-1.3009	0.4449			
162	6	June 10, 2347	0:44:42	Partial	67.1S 170.8E	-1.2329	0.567			
162	7	June 20, 2365	7:44:13	Partial	66.1S 55.7E	-1.1623	0.6935			
162	8	July 1, 2383	14:37:42	Partial	65.1S 57.5W	-1.087	0.8276			
162	9	July 11, 2401	21:29:20	Partial	64.2S 169.9W	-1.0111	0.962			
162	10	July 23, 2419	4:16:45	Annular	45.6S 98.2E	-0.9322	0.9753	242	2m 17s	
162	11	August 2, 2437	11:06:01	Annular	37.4S 2.8W	-0.8553	0.9741	175	2m 33s	
162	12	August 13, 2455	17:54:37	Annular	32.3S 104.2W	-0.7781	0.9716	158	2m 52s	
162	13	August 24, 2473	0:46:32	Annular	29.3S 153.6E	-0.7043	0.9684	156	3m 12s	
162	14	September 4, 2491	7:41:15	Annular	27.7S 50.9E	-0.6332	0.9646	161	3m 34s	
162	15	September 15, 2509	14:42:15	Annular	27.3S 53.4W	-0.5679	0.9604	171	3m 58s	
162	16	September 26, 2527	21:48:45	Annular	27.9S 158.9W	-0.5074	0.9559	183	4m 25s	
162	17	October 7, 2545	5:01:15	Annular	29.1S 94.4E	-0.4523	0.9514	197	4m 54s	
162	18	October 18, 2563	12:21:39	Annular	30.7S 14.2W	-0.4042	0.9467	213	5m 26s	
162	19	October 28, 2581	19:49:23	Annular	32.6S 124.3W	-0.3627	0.9422	228	6m 0s	
162	20	November 9, 2599	3:25:06	Annular	34.5S 123.9E	-0.3282	0.9379	244	6m 35s	
162	21	November 20, 2617	11:07:13	Annular	36.2S 11E	-0.2995	0.9339	258	7m 11s	
162	22	December 1, 2635	18:56:55	Annular	37.4S 103.5W	-0.2774	0.9302	272	7m 47s	
162	23	December 12, 2653	2:51:33	Annular	38S 141.1E	-0.2599	0.9271	284	8m 21s	
162	24	December 23, 2671	10:50:32	Annular	37.8S 24.7E	-0.2466	0.9246	294	8m 52s	
162	25	January 2, 2690	18:52:25	Annular	36.6S 92.6W	-0.236	0.9226	301	9m 17s	
162	26	January 15, 2708	2:56:17	Annular	34.6S 149.2E	-0.2277	0.9212	306	9m 38s	
162	27	January 25, 2726	10:59:24	Annular	31.7S 30.7E	-0.2189	0.9206	308	9m 52s	
162	28	February 5, 2744	19:00:30	Annular	28S 88.1W	-0.2086	0.9205	308	10m 1s	
162	29	February 16, 2762	2:58:17	Annular	23.6S 153.3E	-0.1959	0.9211	304	10m 4s	
162	30	February 27, 2780	10:51:54	Annular	18.6S 35.1E	-0.1801	0.9221	299	10m 3s	
162	31	March 9, 2798	18:37:54	Annular	13.1S 81.7W	-0.158	0.9238	291	9m 57s	
162	32	March 20, 2816	2:17:34	Annular	7.2S 162.7E	-0.1307	0.9259	281	9m 48s	
162	33	March 31, 2834	9:48:16	Annular	1S 49.1E	-0.0959	0.9284	270	9m 33s	
162	34	April 10, 2852	17:12:01	Annular	5.4N 62.8W	-0.0555	0.931	258	9m 13s	
162	35	April 22, 2870	0:24:56	Annular	12N 171.8W	-0.0061	0.934	246	8m 47s	
162	36	May 2, 2888	7:31:10	Annular	18.6N 81.1E	0.0488	0.9369	235	8m 17s	
162	37	May 14, 2906	14:27:44	Annular	25.2N 23W	0.1121	0.9398	225	7m 41s	
162	38	May 24, 2924	21:17:54	Annular	31.5N 124.7W	0.1805	0.9426	216	7m 2s	
162	39	June 5, 2942	4:00:12	Annular	37.5N 136.5E	0.2556	0.9452	209	6m 22s	
162	40	June 15, 2960	10:38:45	Annular	42.9N 40E	0.334	0.9474	205	5m 45s	
162	41	June 26, 2978	17:12:36	Annular	47.7N 53.9W	0.4165	0.9493	205	5m 12s	
162	42	July 6, 2996	23:44:03	Annular	51.6N 145.6W	0.5013	0.9508	208	4m 44s	
162	43	July 19, 3014	06:14:29	Annular	54.5N 124.3E	0.5872	0.9517	218	4m 23s	
162	44	July 29, 3032	12:45:47	Annular	56.5N 35.2 E	0.6728	0.9522	235	4m 7s	
162	45	August 9, 3050	19:19:09	Annular	57.8N 53.6W	0.7568	0.9520	266	3m 57S	
162	46	August 20, 3068	01:55:43	Annular	58.7N 142.5W	0.8386	0.9512	324	3m 50s	
162	47	August 31, 3086	08:38:06	Annular	59.8N 129.3E	0.9162	0.9495	457	3m 47s	
162	48	September 11, 3104	15:26:43	Annular	61.6N 52.2E	0.9893	0.9456	-	3m 44s	
162	49	September 22, 3122	22:22:21	Partial	61.1N 44.6W	1.0569	0.8692	-	-	
162	50	October 3, 3140	05:26:49	Partial	61.2N 158.7W	1.1177	0.7639	-	-	
162	51	October 14, 3158	12:40:14	Partial	61.4N 84.9E	1.1716	0.6708	-	-	
162	52	October 24, 3176	20:03:48	Partial	61.9N 34.1W	1.2180	0.5907	-	-	
162	53	November 5, 3194	03:35:16	Partial	62.4N 155.2W	1.2585	0.5206	-	-	
162	54	November 15, 3212	11:17:54	Partial	63.1N 80.7E	1.2904	0.4655	-	-	
162	55	November 26, 3230	19:08:34	Partial	63.9N 45.5W	1.3162	0.4210	-	-	
162	56	December 7, 3248	03:08:54	Partial	64.8N 174.5W	1.3349	0.3887	-	-	
162	57	December 18, 3266	11:15:18	Partial	65.8N 54.7E	1.3492	0.3639	-	-	
162	58	December 28, 3284	19:29:42	Partial	66.9N 78.6W	1.3578	0.3487	-	-	
162	59	January 10, 3303	03:47:54	Partial	67.9N 146.7E	1.3640	0.3377	-	-	
162	60	January 20, 3321	12:10:10	Partial	69.0N 10.4E	1.3674	0.3314	-	-	
162	61	January 31, 3339	20:33:45	Partial	69.9N 126.8W	1.3705	0.3255	-	-	
162	62	February 11, 3357	04:58:24	Partial	70.8N 95.0E	1.3732	0.3201	-	-	
162	63	February 22, 3375	13:20:49	Partial	71.5N 43.2W	1.3785	0.3101	-	-	
162	64	March 4, 3393	21:40:44	Partial	72.0N 178.8E	1.3865	0.2951	-	-	
162	65	March 17, 3411	05:56:23	Partial	72.2N 41.4E	1.3984	0.2729	-	-	
162	66	March 27, 3429	14:07:42	Partial	72.1N 94.9W	1.4144	0.2433	-	-	
162	67	April 7, 3447	22:11:35	Partial	71.8N 130.9E	1.4369	0.2015	-	-	
162	68	April 18, 3465	06:10:09	Partial	71.3N 1.6W	1.4644	0.1504	-	-	
162	69	April 29, 3483	14:01:00	Partial	70.6N 131.6W	1.4987	0.0863	-	-	
162	70	May 10, 3501	21:46:54	Partial	69.8N 100.3E	1.5374	0.0133	-	-	
