= Solar Saros 161 =

Saros cycle series 161 for solar eclipses

Saros cycle series 161 for solar eclipses will occur at the Moon's ascending node, repeating every 18 years, 11 days, containing 72 eclipses, 43 of which will be umbral (35 total, 3 hybrid, 5 annular). The first eclipse will occur on 1 April 2174 and the last eclipse will occur on 20 May 3454.

The longest totality will be 5 minutes 28 seconds on 24 September 2462 and the longest annular will be 2 minutes 6 seconds on 12 October 3093. This solar saros is linked to Lunar Saros 154.

== Umbral eclipses ==
Umbral eclipses (annular, total and hybrid) can be further classified as either: 1) Central (two limits), 2) Central (one limit) or 3) Non-Central (one limit). The statistical distribution of these classes in Saros series 161 appears in the following table.

Classification	Number	Percent
All Umbral eclipses	43	100.00%
Central (two limits)	43	100.00%
Central (one limit)	0	0.00%
Non-central (one limit)	0	0.00%

== All Eclipses ==
Saros	Member	Date	Time (Greatest) UTC	Type	Location Lat, Long	Gamma	Mag.	Width (km)	Duration (min:sec)	Ref
161	1	April 1, 2174	22:39:09	Partial	61.2N 103.8E	1.5107	0.047			
161	2	April 12, 2192	6:41:56	Partial	61.5N 25.4W	1.4678	0.126			
161	3	April 24, 2210	14:39:19	Partial	61.9N 153.4W	1.4202	0.2148			
161	4	May 4, 2228	22:28:44	Partial	62.4N 80.4E	1.3659	0.3173			
161	5	May 16, 2246	6:14:10	Partial	63.1N 44.9W	1.3077	0.4284			
161	6	May 26, 2264	13:52:07	Partial	63.9N 168.5W	1.243	0.5526			
161	7	June 6, 2282	21:28:19	Partial	64.8N 68E	1.1764	0.6815			
161	8	June 18, 2300	4:59:29	Partial	65.7N 54.5W	1.1056	0.8189			
161	9	June 29, 2318	12:30:22	Partial	66.7N 177.3W	1.034	0.9583			
161	10	July 9, 2336	19:58:22	Total	83.2N 49.4E	0.9598	1.0657	800	3m 17s	
161	11	July 21, 2354	3:28:22	Total	81.4N 171.7E	0.887	1.0697	499	3m 51s	
161	12	July 31, 2372	10:58:30	Total	71N 45.5E	0.8144	1.0717	404	4m 18s	
161	13	August 11, 2390	18:31:27	Total	61.3N 72.5W	0.7441	1.0724	353	4m 41s	
161	14	August 22, 2408	2:07:39	Total	52.3N 170E	0.6766	1.072	317	5m 0s	
161	15	September 2, 2426	9:48:47	Total	43.8N 51.6E	0.6133	1.0709	291	5m 14s	
161	16	September 12, 2444	17:35:35	Total	35.7N 67.9W	0.5548	1.0688	268	5m 24s	
161	17	September 24, 2462	1:28:08	Total	28.1N 171.4E	0.5014	1.0662	249	5m 28s	
161	18	October 4, 2480	9:27:58	Total	21.1N 49.2E	0.4543	1.0631	231	5m 26s	
161	19	October 15, 2498	17:34:44	Total	14.6N 74.5W	0.4131	1.0597	215	5m 21s	
161	20	October 27, 2516	1:48:46	Total	8.8N 160.5E	0.3782	1.056	199	5m 11s	
161	21	November 7, 2534	10:10:07	Total	3.9N 34E	0.3495	1.0522	184	4m 58s	
161	22	November 17, 2552	18:38:45	Total	0.3S 93.9W	0.3269	1.0485	170	4m 42s	
161	23	November 29, 2570	3:13:44	Total	3.4S 137.1E	0.31	1.0449	158	4m 25s	
161	24	December 9, 2588	11:53:28	Total	5.6S 7.2E	0.2973	1.0416	146	4m 7s	
161	25	December 21, 2606	20:37:56	Total	6.7S 123.7W	0.2888	1.0387	135	3m 50s	
161	26	January 1, 2625	5:25:27	Total	6.8S 104.8E	0.2829	1.0361	126	3m 32s	
161	27	January 12, 2643	14:14:06	Total	6S 27W	0.2784	1.0341	119	3m 18s	
161	28	January 22, 2661	23:02:23	Total	4.4S 158.8W	0.274	1.0324	113	3m 4s	
161	29	February 3, 2679	7:49:00	Total	2.1S 69.7E	0.2685	1.0312	109	2m 54s	
161	30	February 13, 2697	16:33:04	Total	0.7N 61.3W	0.2612	1.0305	106	2m 46s	
161	31	February 26, 2715	1:11:19	Total	3.7N 169.2E	0.2495	1.0302	105	2m 42s	
161	32	March 8, 2733	9:44:50	Total	7N 40.8E	0.2343	1.0301	104	2m 39s	
161	33	March 19, 2751	18:10:35	Total	10.2N 85.4W	0.2131	1.0303	105	2m 38s	
161	34	March 30, 2769	2:29:32	Total	13.2N 150.3E	0.1866	1.0307	105	2m 40s	
161	35	April 10, 2787	10:38:57	Total	15.7N 28.7E	0.1525	1.031	106	2m 43s	
161	36	April 20, 2805	18:41:09	Total	17.7N 90.7W	0.1129	1.0313	106	2m 46s	
161	37	May 2, 2823	2:34:05	Total	18.9N 152.6E	0.0662	1.0314	106	2m 51s	
161	38	May 12, 2841	10:18:35	Total	19.1N 38.2E	0.0129	1.0312	105	2m 55s	
161	39	May 23, 2859	17:54:35	Total	18.2N 74W	-0.0467	1.0305	103	2m 58s	
161	40	June 3, 2877	1:23:34	Total	16.2N 175.3E	-0.1114	1.0294	100	2m 58s	
161	41	June 14, 2895	8:45:51	Total	12.9N 65.9E	-0.1811	1.0278	96	2m 55s	
161	42	June 25, 2913	16:01:38	Total	8.5N 42.4W	-0.2551	1.0255	90	2m 45s	
161	43	July 6, 2931	23:13:24	Total	3.1N 150.5W	-0.3316	1.0226	81	2m 30s	
161	44	July 17, 2949	6:21:27	Total	3.2S 101.6E	-0.4099	1.0189	71	2m 6s	
161	45	July 28, 2967	13:27:22	Hybrid	10.4S 6.5W	-0.4892	1.0147	58	1m 37s	
161	46	August 7, 2985	20:31:50	Hybrid	18.3S 115W	-0.5686	1.0097	41	1m 2s	
161	47	August 20, 3003	03:37:08	Hybrid	26.8S 135.4E	-0.6463	1.0042	19	0m 26s	
161	48	August 30, 3021	10:44:28	Annular	35.7S 24.4E	-0.7210	0.9980	10	0m 11s	
161	49	September 10, 3039	17:53:36	Annular	45.2S 88.5W	-0.7932	0.9914	49	0m 46s	
161	50	September 21, 3057	01:07:57	Annular	55.0S 155.0E	-0.8600	0.9842	109	1m 17s	
161	51	October 2, 3075	08:26:38	Annular	65.0S 31.2E	-0.9225	0.9765	219	1m 44s	
161	52	October 12, 3093	15:52:48	Annular	73.6S 116.7W	-0.9778	0.9678	592	2m 6s	
161	53	October 24, 3111	23:23:27	Partial	71.4S 79.6E	-1.0286	0.9241	-	-	
161	54	November 4, 3129	07:02:38	Partial	70.6S 47.7W	-1.0714	0.8469	-	-	
161	55	November 15, 3147	14:47:14	Partial	69.7S 175.6W	-1.1090	0.7797	-	-	
161	56	November 25, 3165	22:39:30	Partial	68.7S 55.1E	-1.1396	0.7254	-	-	
161	57	December 7, 3183	06:36:48	Partial	67.6S 74.8W	-1.1654	0.6801	-	-	
161	58	December 17, 3201	14:40:49	Partial	66.5S 154.2E	-1.1852	0.6456	-	-	
161	59	December 28, 3219	22:48:15	Partial	65.4S 22.8E	-1.2013	0.6176	-	-	
161	60	January 8, 3238	06:58:53	Partial	64.4S 109.0W	-1.2143	0.5952	-	-	
161	61	January 19, 3256	15:10:37	Partial	63.5S 119.3E	-1.2257	0.5757	-	-	
161	62	January 29, 3274	23:23:20	Partial	62.8S 12.3W	-1.2361	0.5580	-	-	
161	63	February 10, 3292	07:33:12	Partial	62.1S 143.0W	-1.2482	0.5377	-	-	
161	64	February 21, 3310	15:40:24	Partial	61.6S 87.2E	-1.2618	0.5147	-	-	
161	65	March 3, 3328	23:42:09	Partial	61.3S 41.2W	-1.2795	0.4849	-	-	
161	66	March 15, 3346	07:39:13	Partial	61.1S 168.3W	-1.3006	0.4495	-	-	
161	67	March 25, 3364	15:26:47	Partial	61.1S 66.9E	-1.3287	0.4019	-	-	
161	68	April 5, 3382	23:07:52	Partial	61.3S 56.2W	-1.3616	0.3464	-	-	
161	69	April 17, 3400	06:38:31	Partial	61.7S 176.8W	-1.4020	0.2777	-	-	
161	70	April 28, 3418	14:01:32	Partial	62.2S 64.4E	-1.4481	0.1994	-	-	
161	71	May 8, 3436	21:13:13	Partial	62.8S 51.7W	-1.5026	0.1065	-	-	
161	72	May 20, 3454	04:17:52	Partial	63.5S 166.3W	-1.5619	0.0051	-	-	
