= Lunar Saros 152 =

Eclipse cycle of the moon

Saros cycle series 152 for lunar eclipses occurs at the moon's ascending node, 18 years 11 and 1/3 days. It contains 72 events.

The total lunar eclipse of June 5, 2756 is notable for having an exceptionally large umbral magnitude of 1.8822; this is due to a few factors such as the moon's distance to earth being very close to perigee, the earth's distance from the sun being close to aphelion and an eclipse gamma very close to zero with a gamma of 0.00175. This is also a notable eclipse because it is the second largest total lunar eclipse and one of three total lunar eclipses with an umbral magnitude of greater than 1.88 in a 6000-year period between 3000 BCE to 3000 CE. This eclipse is the largest total lunar eclipse of the third millennium and the largest total lunar eclipse since April 4, 2573, BCE.

Cat.	Saros	Mem	Date	Time UT (hr:mn)	Type	Gamma	Magnitude	Duration (min)			Contacts UT (hr:mn)						Chart	QSE
Cat.	Saros	Mem	Date	Greatest	Type	Gamma	Magnitude	Pen.	Par.	Tot.	P1	P4	U1	U2	U3	U4	Chart	QSE
09894	152	1	2107 May 07	4:30:24	Penumbral	1.5588	-1.0103	22.2			4:19:18	4:41:30						
09936	152	2	2125 May 17	11:46:31	Penumbral	1.4923	-0.8854	100.9			10:56:04	12:36:58						
09979	152	3	2143 May 28	18:59:24	Penumbral	1.4219	-0.7536	140.9			17:48:57	20:09:51						
10023	152	4	2161 Jun 08	2:08:54	Penumbral	1.3475	-0.6146	171.5			0:43:09	3:34:39						
10066	152	5	2179 Jun 19	9:16:11	Penumbral	1.2701	-0.4703	196.7			7:37:50	10:54:32						
10109	152	6	2197 Jun 29	16:22:52	Penumbral	1.1911	-0.3233	217.8			14:33:58	18:11:46						
10153	152	7	2215 Jul 11	23:30:24	Penumbral	1.1114	-0.1753	235.8			21:32:30	1:28:18						
10197	152	8	2233 Jul 22	6:40:42	Penumbral	1.0328	-0.0297	250.9			4:35:15	8:46:09						
10242	152	9	2251 Aug 02	13:53:15	Partial	0.9548	0.1145	263.8	75.6		11:41:21	16:05:09	13:15:27			14:31:03		
10288	152	10	2269 Aug 12	21:11:37	Partial	0.8806	0.2517	274.5	109.6		18:54:22	23:28:52	20:16:49			22:06:25		
10334	152	11	2287 Aug 24	4:35:07	Partial	0.8094	0.3829	283.4	132.2		2:13:25	6:56:49	3:29:01			5:41:13		
10380	152	12	2305 Sep 04	12:05:50	Partial	0.7436	0.5042	290.6	148.5		9:40:32	14:31:08	10:51:35			13:20:05		
10426	152	13	2323 Sep 15	19:43:08	Partial	0.6823	0.6167	296.5	160.9		17:14:53	22:11:23	18:22:41			21:03:35		
10472	152	14	2341 Sep 26	3:29:16	Partial	0.6276	0.7172	301.1	170.2		0:58:43	5:59:49	2:04:10			4:54:22		
10517	152	15	2359 Oct 07	11:23:43	Partial	0.5791	0.8059	304.7	177.3		8:51:22	13:56:04	9:55:04			12:52:22		
10562	152	16	2377 Oct 17	19:26:08	Partial	0.5368	0.8833	307.4	182.7		16:52:26	21:59:50	17:54:47			20:57:29		
10606	152	17	2395 Oct 29	3:37:44	Partial	0.5017	0.9474	309.4	186.6		1:03:02	6:12:26	2:04:26			5:11:02		
10652	152	18	2413 Nov 08	11:57:24	Partial	0.4733	0.9993	310.7	189.5		9:22:03	14:32:45	10:22:39			13:32:09		
10696	152	19	2431 Nov 19	20:25:36	Total	0.4513	1.0394	311.6	191.4	29.6	17:49:48	23:01:24	18:49:54	20:10:48	20:40:24	22:01:18		
10740	152	20	2449 Nov 30	4:59:05	Total	0.4334	1.0721	312.1	192.8	39.5	2:23:02	7:35:08	3:22:41	4:39:20	5:18:50	6:35:29		
10783	152	21	2467 Dec 11	13:39:54	Total	0.4214	1.0943	312.3	193.7	44.8	11:03:45	16:16:03	12:03:03	13:17:30	14:02:18	15:16:45		
10825	152	22	2485 Dec 21	22:24:27	Total	0.4123	1.1110	312.2	194.2	48.3	19:48:21	1:00:33	20:47:21	22:00:18	22:48:36	0:01:33		
10866	152	23	2504 Jan 03	7:13:07	Total	0.4063	1.1225	312.0	194.5	50.5	4:37:07	9:49:07	5:35:52	6:47:52	7:38:22	8:50:22		
10907	152	24	2522 Jan 13	16:02:19	Total	0.4007	1.1333	311.8	194.7	52.4	13:26:25	18:38:13	14:24:58	15:36:07	16:28:31	17:39:40		
10947	152	25	2540 Jan 25	0:52:56	Total	0.3958	1.1432	311.5	195.0	54.1	22:17:11	3:28:41	23:15:26	0:25:53	1:19:59	2:30:26		
10989	152	26	2558 Feb 04	9:41:29	Total	0.3892	1.1564	311.3	195.4	56.3	7:05:50	12:17:08	8:03:47	9:13:20	10:09:38	11:19:11		
11030	152	27	2576 Feb 15	18:27:33	Total	0.3803	1.1739	311.2	196.1	59.0	15:51:57	21:03:09	16:49:30	17:58:03	18:57:03	20:05:36		
11070	152	28	2594 Feb 26	3:08:54	Total	0.3674	1.1989	311.3	197.0	62.5	0:33:15	5:44:33	1:30:24	2:37:39	3:40:09	4:47:24		
11110	152	29	2612 Mar 09	11:45:52	Total	0.3508	1.2308	311.6	198.3	66.7	9:10:04	14:21:40	10:06:43	11:12:31	12:19:13	13:25:01		
11150	152	30	2630 Mar 20	20:15:16	Total	0.3279	1.2746	312.1	199.9	71.7	17:39:13	22:51:19	18:35:19	19:39:25	20:51:07	21:55:13		
11191	152	31	2648 Mar 31	4:38:32	Total	0.2996	1.3281	312.9	201.8	76.9	2:02:05	7:14:59	2:57:38	4:00:05	5:16:59	6:19:26		
11233	152	32	2666 Apr 11	12:53:42	Total	0.2646	1.3938	313.8	203.9	82.3	10:16:48	15:30:36	11:11:45	12:12:33	13:34:51	14:35:39		
11276	152	33	2684 Apr 21	21:02:50	Total	0.2245	1.4689	314.7	206.0	87.4	18:25:29	23:40:11	19:19:50	20:19:08	21:46:32	22:45:50		
11318	152	34	2702 May 4	5:02:21	Total	0.1763	1.5588	315.7	208.0	92.1	2:24:30	7:40:12	3:18:21	4:16:18	5:48:24	6:46:21		
11361	152	35	2720 May 14	12:56:50	Total	0.1238	1.6564	316.5	209.7	95.8	10:18:35	15:35:05	11:11:59	12:08:56	13:44:44	14:41:41		
11403	152	36	2738 May 25	20:43:19	Total	0.0643	1.7667	317.1	210.9	98.3	18:04:46	23:21:52	18:57:52	19:54:10	21:32:28	22:28:46		
11446	152	37	2756 Jun 05	4:26:06	Total	0.0018	1.8821	317.4	211.5	99.3	1:47:24	7:04:48	2:40:21	3:36:27	5:15:45	6:11:51		
11490	152	38	2774 Jun 16	12:01:40	Total	-0.0668	1.7634	317.1	211.2	98.5	9:23:07	14:40:13	10:16:04	11:12:25	12:50:55	13:47:16		
11536	152	39	2792 Jun 26	19:36:07	Total	-0.1364	1.6360	316.3	209.9	95.5	16:57:58	22:14:16	17:51:10	18:48:22	20:23:52	21:21:04		
11582	152	40	2810 Jul 08	3:06:03	Total	-0.2100	1.5009	314.9	207.5	89.7	0:28:36	5:43:30	1:22:18	2:21:12	3:50:54	4:49:48		
11630	152	41	2828 Jul 18	10:35:28	Total	-0.2838	1.3651	312.8	203.9	80.6	7:59:04	13:11:52	8:53:31	9:55:10	11:15:46	12:17:25		
11677	152	42	2846 Jul 29	18:03:14	Total	-0.3588	1.2268	310.0	199.0	66.6	15:28:14	20:38:14	16:23:44	17:29:56	18:36:32	19:42:44		
11723	152	43	2864 Aug 09	1:33:03	Total	-0.4318	1.0918	306.6	192.8	44.3	22:59:45	4:06:21	23:56:39	1:10:54	1:55:12	3:09:27		
11769	152	44	2882 Aug 20	9:04:14	Partial	-0.5034	0.9591	302.5	185.4		6:32:59	11:35:29	7:31:32			10:36:56		
11815	152	45	2900 Aug 31	16:38:06	Partial	-0.5725	0.8309	298.0	176.7		14:09:06	19:07:06	15:09:45			18:06:27		
11860	152	46	2918 Sep 12	0:16:22	Partial	-0.6373	0.7101	293.1	166.9		21:49:49	2:42:55	22:52:55			1:39:49		
11905	152	47	2936 Sep 22	7:59:30	Partial	-0.6977	0.5973	288.0	156.2		5:35:30	10:23:30	6:41:24			9:17:36		
11950	152	48	2954 Oct 03	15:48:15	Partial	-0.7528	0.4940	282.9	144.6		13:26:48	18:09:42	14:35:57			17:00:33		
11996	152	49	2972 Oct 13	23:42:46	Partial	-0.8027	0.4002	277.8	132.2		21:23:52	2:01:40	22:36:40			0:48:52		
12040	152	50	2990 Oct 25	7:44:40	Partial	-0.8460	0.3182	273.2	119.6		5:28:04	10:01:16	6:44:52			8:44:28		

== See also ==
- List of lunar eclipses
  - List of Saros series for lunar eclipses
