= Solar Saros 110 =

Saros cycle series 110 for solar eclipses

Historic saros cycle animation

Saros cycle series 110 for solar eclipses occurred at the Moon's descending node, repeating every 18 years, 11 days, containing 72 eclipses, 39 of which were umbral, all annular. This series began on 30 August 463 and ended on 17 October 1743. The annular eclipse with the longest duration was 29 December 1274 lasting 11 minutes and 44 seconds.

This solar saros is linked to Lunar Saros 103.

== Umbral eclipses ==
Umbral eclipses (annular, total and hybrid) can be further classified as either: 1) Central (two limits), 2) Central (one limit) or 3) Non-Central (one limit). The statistical distribution of these classes in Saros series 110 appears in the following table.

Classification	Number	Percent
All Umbral eclipses	39	100.00%
Central (two limits)	39	100.00%
Central (one limit)	0	0.00%
Non-central (one limit)	0	0.00%

== All eclipses ==
Note: Dates are given in the Julian calendar prior to 15 October 1582, and in the Gregorian calendar after that.

Saros	Member	Date	Time (Greatest) UTC	Type	Location Lat, Long	Gamma	Mag.	Width (km)	Duration (min:sec)	Ref
110	1	August 30, 463	12:11:41	Partial	61.4S 51.2W	-1.4959	0.0774			
110	2	September 9, 481	20:08:13	Partial	61.1S 179.9W	-1.4589	0.1488			
110	3	September 21, 499	4:11:45	Partial	61S 49.8E	-1.4281	0.2079			
110	4	October 1, 517	12:22:50	Partial	61S 82.5W	-1.4042	0.2535			
110	5	October 12, 535	20:41:01	Partial	61.3S 143.5E	-1.3865	0.2873			
110	6	October 23, 553	5:04:28	Partial	61.6S 8.1E	-1.3737	0.3117			
110	7	November 3, 571	13:34:02	Partial	62.2S 128.9W	-1.3665	0.3256			
110	8	November 13, 589	22:07:32	Partial	62.9S 92.9E	-1.3634	0.332			
110	9	November 25, 607	6:44:16	Partial	63.7S 46.4W	-1.3633	0.3327			
110	10	December 5, 625	15:21:37	Partial	64.6S 173.9E	-1.3647	0.3308			
110	11	December 16, 643	23:59:22	Partial	65.6S 33.8E	-1.3669	0.3272			
110	12	December 27, 661	8:34:50	Partial	66.7S 106.2W	-1.3681	0.3254			
110	13	January 7, 680	17:06:18	Partial	67.7S 114.3E	-1.3669	0.3276			
110	14	January 18, 698	1:32:29	Partial	68.7S 24.4W	-1.3624	0.3359			
110	15	January 29, 716	9:52:15	Partial	69.7S 162.2W	-1.3537	0.3514			
110	16	February 8, 734	18:03:13	Partial	70.5S 61.7E	-1.3386	0.3781			
110	17	February 20, 752	2:05:24	Partial	71.2S 72.7W	-1.3174	0.4159			
110	18	March 2, 770	9:57:41	Partial	71.7S 154.8E	-1.2892	0.4661			
110	19	March 12, 788	17:41:00	Partial	71.9S 24.3E	-1.2547	0.5273			
110	20	March 24, 806	1:12:11	Partial	71.9S 103.2W	-1.2111	0.6048			
110	21	April 3, 824	8:35:03	Partial	71.6S 131.6E	-1.1616	0.6928			
110	22	April 14, 842	15:47:20	Partial	71.1S 9.3E	-1.1039	0.795			
110	23	April 24, 860	22:52:40	Partial	70.5S 110.7W	-1.0414	0.9057			
110	24	May 6, 878	5:48:12	Annular	57.7S 120.3E	-0.9715	0.9711	455	2m 28s	
110	25	May 16, 896	12:39:28	Annular	43.7S 6.4E	-0.8986	0.9727	224	2m 43s	
110	26	May 27, 914	19:24:02	Annular	33.2S 100.7W	-0.8205	0.9728	171	3m 0s	
110	27	June 7, 932	2:05:46	Annular	24.7S 154.8E	-0.7406	0.9719	150	3m 19s	
110	28	June 18, 950	8:43:41	Annular	17.5S 52.5E	-0.658	0.9703	142	3m 40s	
110	29	June 28, 968	15:22:11	Annular	11.7S 49W	-0.5764	0.968	140	4m 1s	
110	30	July 9, 986	22:00:35	Annular	7S 149.8W	-0.4952	0.9651	144	4m 22s	
110	31	July 20, 1004	4:41:00	Annular	3.7S 109.6E	-0.4161	0.9618	151	4m 42s	
110	32	July 31, 1022	11:25:00	Annular	1.5S 8.4E	-0.3406	0.958	161	5m 3s	
110	33	August 10, 1040	18:14:08	Annular	0.4S 93.7W	-0.2696	0.9539	174	5m 24s	
110	34	August 22, 1058	1:09:14	Annular	0.4S 162.7E	-0.2043	0.9496	188	5m 47s	
110	35	September 1, 1076	8:10:51	Annular	1.2S 57.6E	-0.1448	0.9452	204	6m 13s	
110	36	September 12, 1094	15:20:29	Annular	2.8S 49.7W	-0.0922	0.9408	220	6m 41s	
110	37	September 22, 1112	22:38:26	Annular	4.8S 159.1W	-0.0469	0.9365	237	7m 13s	
110	38	October 4, 1130	6:03:42	Annular	7.2S 89.7E	-0.008	0.9324	253	7m 48s	
110	39	October 14, 1148	13:38:06	Annular	9.7S 23.9W	0.0231	0.9286	268	8m 26s	
110	40	October 25, 1166	21:19:40	Annular	12.2S 139.2W	0.0477	0.9253	282	9m 5s	
110	41	November 5, 1184	5:09:12	Annular	14.4S 103.7E	0.0659	0.9224	294	9m 45s	
110	42	November 16, 1202	13:02:26	Annular	16.2S 14.2W	0.0809	0.9201	303	10m 23s	
110	43	November 26, 1220	21:01:31	Annular	17.4S 133.4W	0.0907	0.9185	311	10m 57s	
110	44	December 8, 1238	5:02:16	Annular	17.9S 107.1E	0.0988	0.9175	315	11m 23s	
110	45	December 18, 1256	13:04:38	Annular	17.5S 12.7W	0.1055	0.9172	317	11m 39s	
110	46	December 29, 1274	21:04:54	Annular	16.2S 132.2W	0.1138	0.9175	316	11m 44s	
110	47	January 9, 1293	5:03:32	Annular	13.9S 108.4E	0.1233	0.9185	312	11m 36s	
110	48	January 20, 1311	12:57:37	Annular	10.6S 10.1W	0.1365	0.92	306	11m 18s	
110	49	January 30, 1329	20:45:47	Annular	6.5S 127.7W	0.1543	0.9222	297	10m 51s	
110	50	February 11, 1347	4:27:03	Annular	1.5S 116E	0.1778	0.9248	287	10m 17s	
110	51	February 21, 1365	12:00:58	Annular	4.1N 1.2E	0.2074	0.9279	276	9m 38s	
110	52	March 4, 1383	19:25:59	Annular	10.4N 111.8W	0.2444	0.9312	265	8m 56s	
110	53	March 15, 1401	2:42:43	Annular	17.2N 137.1E	0.2885	0.9347	253	8m 12s	
110	54	March 26, 1419	9:50:57	Annular	24.5N 28E	0.3399	0.9383	243	7m 25s	
110	55	April 5, 1437	16:52:06	Annular	32.1N 79.3W	0.3974	0.9419	233	6m 39s	
110	56	April 16, 1455	23:44:01	Annular	40N 176.1E	0.4628	0.9454	227	5m 53s	
110	57	April 27, 1473	6:30:57	Annular	48.1N 73.3E	0.5328	0.9486	223	5m 10s	
110	58	May 8, 1491	13:11:33	Annular	56.5N 26.9W	0.6085	0.9514	225	4m 30s	
110	59	May 18, 1509	19:49:36	Annular	64.9N 124.3W	0.6865	0.9539	233	3m 56s	
110	60	May 30, 1527	2:23:01	Annular	73.4N 144.6E	0.7688	0.9556	255	3m 28s	
110	61	June 9, 1545	8:57:28	Annular	81.2N 72E	0.8506	0.9567	303	3m 6s	
110	62	June 20, 1563	15:30:55	Annular	81.3N 55.3E	0.9338	0.9564	454	2m 49s	
110	63	June 30, 1581	22:06:53	Partial	64.2N 2.2W	1.0152	0.9454			
110	64	July 22, 1599	4:45:15	Partial	63.4N 111.2W	1.0949	0.8068			
110	65	August 1, 1617	11:29:44	Partial	62.7N 138.3E	1.1702	0.6756			
110	66	August 12, 1635	18:20:10	Partial	62.1N 26.6E	1.2412	0.5514			
110	67	August 23, 1653	1:17:26	Partial	61.6N 86.7W	1.3072	0.4356			
110	68	September 3, 1671	8:23:57	Partial	61.3N 157.8E	1.3664	0.3318			
110	69	September 13, 1689	15:39:22	Partial	61.1N 40.2E	1.4191	0.2394			
110	70	September 25, 1707	23:05:05	Partial	61.1N 80W	1.4641	0.1603			
110	71	October 6, 1725	6:39:42	Partial	61.2N 157.7E	1.5029	0.0923			
110	72	October 17, 1743	14:25:42	Partial	61.5N 32.5E	1.5334	0.0387			
