= Saros (astronomy) =

Length of time after which an eclipse repeats

In astronomy, the saros (/ˈsɛərɒs/) is a length of time covering exactly 223 synodic months (Note: 6585.3223 days (.3223 representing 7 hours and 43 minutes)) (18 years 11 days and 8 hours), nearly 242 draconic months, and nearly 239 anomalistic months. Arising naturally due to synchronization between lunar phase, nodal precession, and apsidal precession, it can be used to predict eclipses of the Sun and Moon. One saros period after an eclipse, the Sun, Earth, and Moon return to approximately the same relative geometry, a near straight line, and a nearly identical eclipse will occur, in what is referred to as an eclipse cycle. Every eclipse has an associated saros series and all succeeding or preceding eclipses have a different saros series associated with them - as the eclipse of the same series occurs or occurred with a gap of one saros only. Solar and lunar eclipses have different saros series.

A series of eclipses that are separated by one saros is called a saros series. It corresponds to:

- 6,585.321347 solar days
- 18.029 years
- 223 synodic months
- 241.999 draconic months
- 18.999 eclipse years (38 eclipse seasons of 173.31 days)
- 238.992 anomalistic months
- 241.029 sidereal months

The 19 eclipse years means that if there is a solar eclipse (or lunar eclipse), then after one saros a new moon will take place at the same node of the orbit of the Moon, and under these circumstances another eclipse can occur.

== History ==
The earliest discovered historical record of what is known as the saros is by Chaldean (neo-Babylonian) astronomers in the last several centuries BCE. It was later known to Hipparchus, Pliny and Ptolemy.

The name saros (Ancient Greek: σάρος) was applied to the eclipse cycle by Edmond Halley in 1686, who took it from the Suda, a Byzantine lexicon of the 11th century. The Suda says, "[The saros is] a measure and a number among Chaldeans. For 120 saroi make 2220 years (years of 12 lunar months) according to the Chaldeans' reckoning, if indeed the saros makes 222 lunar months, which are 18 years and 6 months (i.e. years of 12 lunar months)." The information in the Suda in turn was derived directly or otherwise from the Chronicle of Eusebius of Caesarea, which quoted Berossus. (Guillaume Le Gentil claimed that Halley's usage was incorrect in 1756, but the name continues to be used.) The Greek word apparently either comes from the Babylonian word sāru (𒊹) meaning the number 3600 or the Greek verb saro (σαρῶ) that means 'sweep (the sky with the series of eclipses)'.

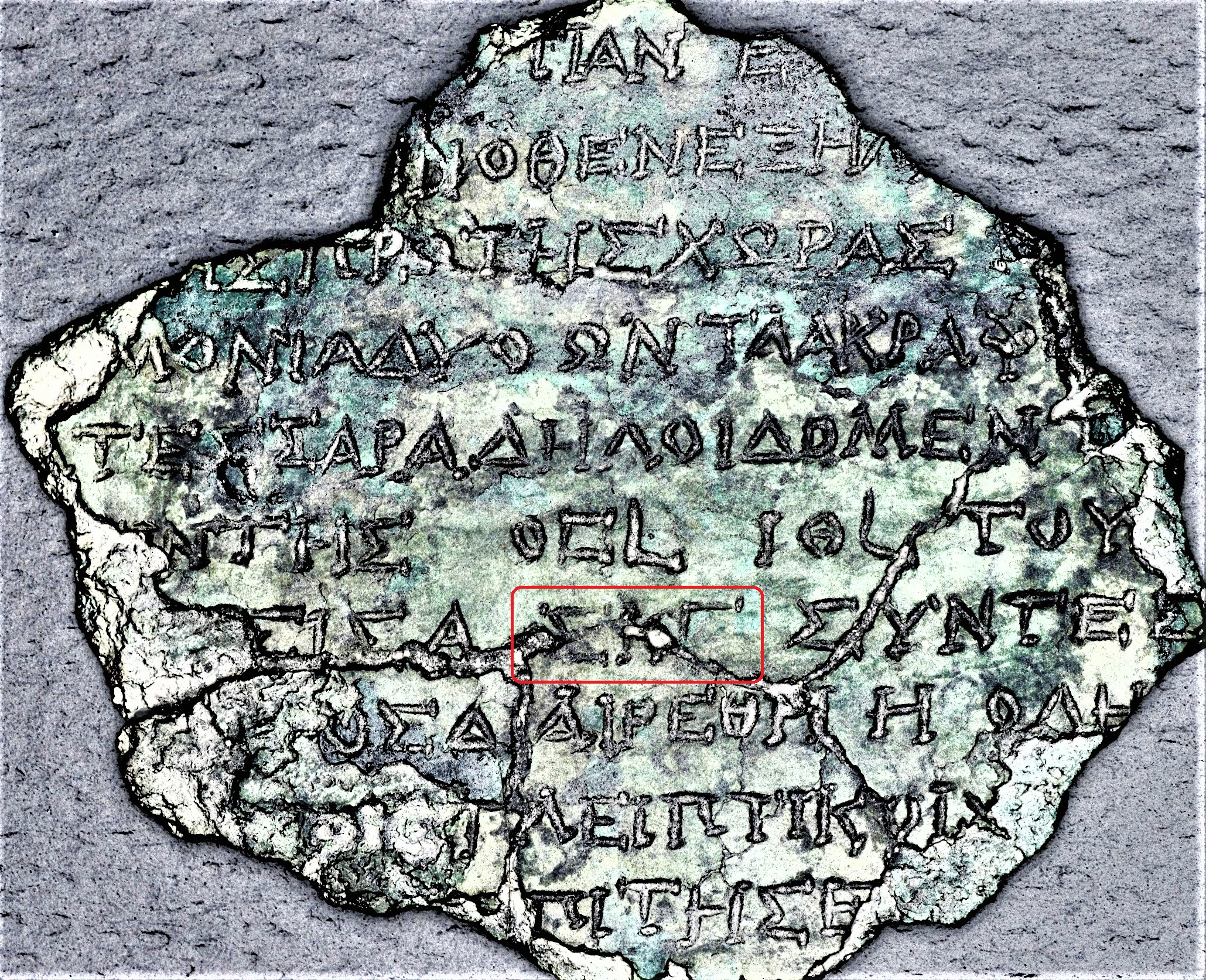
Antikythera Mechanism Saros cycle for the prediction of eclipses ΣΚΓ′, in the red rectangle, and means 223 months. Written between 150 and 100 BCE

The Saros period of 223 lunar months (in Greek numerals, ΣΚΓ′) is in the Antikythera Mechanism user manual on this instrument, made around 150–100 BCE in Greece, as seen in the picture. This number is one of a few inscriptions of the mechanism that are visible with the unaided eye. Above it, the period of the Metonic cycle and the Callippic cycle are also visible.

== Description ==
Lunar eclipses occurring near the Moon's descending node are given odd saros series numbers. The first eclipse in such series passes through the southern edge of the Earth's shadow, and the Moon's path is shifted northward each successive saros, while lunar eclipses occurring near the Moon's ascending node are given even saros series numbers. The first eclipse in such series passes through the northern edge of the Earth's shadow, and the Moon's path is shifted southward each successive saros.

$$\begin{align}
1 \text{ saros} &= 6585.3211 \text{ days} \\
&= 15 \text{ common years} + 3 \text{ leap years} + 12.321 \text{ days} \\
&= 14 \text{ common years} + 4 \text{ leap years} + 11.321 \text{ days} \\
&= 13 \text{ common years} + 5 \text{ leap years} + 10.321 \text{ days}
\end{align}$$

The saros, a period of 6585.3211 days, is useful for predicting the times at which nearly identical eclipses will occur. Three periodicities related to lunar orbit, the synodic month, the draconic month, and the anomalistic month coincide almost perfectly each saros cycle. For an eclipse to occur, either the Moon must be located between the Earth and Sun (for a solar eclipse) or the Earth must be located between the Sun and Moon (for a lunar eclipse). This can happen only when the Moon is new or full, respectively, and repeat occurrences of these lunar phases result from solar and lunar orbits producing the Moon's synodic period of 29.53059 days. During most full and new moons, however, the shadow of the Earth or Moon falls to the north or south of the other body. Eclipses occur when the three bodies form a nearly straight line. Because the plane of the lunar orbit is inclined to that of the Earth, this condition occurs only when a full or new Moon is near or in the ecliptic plane, that is when the Moon is at one of the two nodes (the ascending or descending node). The period of time for two successive lunar passes through the ecliptic plane (returning to the same node) is termed the draconic month, a 27.21222 day period. The three-dimensional geometry of an eclipse, when the new or full moon is near one of the nodes, occurs every five or six months when the Sun is in conjunction or opposition to the Moon and coincidentally also near a node of the Moon's orbit at that time, or twice per eclipse year. Two eclipses separated by one saros have very similar appearance and duration due to the distance between the Earth and Moon being nearly the same for each event: this is because the saros is also an integer multiple of the anomalistic month of 27.5545 days, the period of the moon with respect to the lines of apsides in its orbit.

Visualization of a period of one saros cycle in 3D.

After one saros, the Moon will have completed roughly an integer number of synodic, draconic, and anomalistic periods (223, 242, and 239) and the Earth-Sun-Moon geometry will be nearly identical: the Moon will have the same phase and be at the same node and the same distance from the Earth. In addition, because the saros is close to 18 years in length (about 11 days longer), the Earth will be nearly the same distance from the Sun, and tilted to it in nearly the same orientation (same season). Given the date of an eclipse, one saros later a nearly identical eclipse can be predicted. During this 18-year period, about 40 other solar and lunar eclipses take place, but with a somewhat different geometry. One saros equaling 18.03 years is not equal to a perfect integer number of lunar orbits (Earth revolutions with respect to the fixed stars of 27.32166 days sidereal month), therefore, even though the relative geometry of the Earth–Sun–Moon system will be nearly identical after a saros, the Moon will be in a slightly different position with respect to the stars for each eclipse in a saros series. The axis of rotation of the Earth–Moon system exhibits a precession period of 18.59992 years.

The saros is not an integer number of days, but contains the fraction of 1/3 of a day. Thus each successive eclipse in a saros series occurs about eight hours later in the day. In the case of an eclipse of the Sun, this means that the region of visibility will shift westward about 120°, or about one third of the way around the globe, and the two eclipses will thus not be visible from the same place on Earth. In the case of an eclipse of the Moon, the next eclipse might still be visible from the same location as long as the Moon is above the horizon. Given three saros eclipse intervals, the local time of day of an eclipse will be nearly the same. This three saros interval (19,755.96 days) is known as a triple saros or exeligmos (Greek: "turn of the wheel") cycle.

== Saros series ==
Solar eclipses occurring near the Moon's descending node are given even saros series numbers. The first eclipse of each series starts at the southern limb of the Earth and the eclipse's path is shifted northward with each successive saros, while solar eclipses occurring near the Moon's ascending node are given odd saros series numbers. The first eclipse of each series starts at the northern limb of the Earth and the eclipse's path is shifted southward with each successive saros.

Each solar saros series starts with a partial eclipse (Sun first enters the end of the node, when new Moon occurs east of a node) - which means the first eclipse of the saros series occurs within about 15° to 18° of the node before Earth reaches the node and the moon's elongation is also within the gamma range for an eclipse to occur. In each successive saros, the path of the Moon is shifted either northward (when near the descending node) or southward (when near the ascending node) due to the fact that the saros is not an exact integer of draconic months (223 synodic months of a saros is about one hour short of 242 draconic months - hence, the Moon's node shifts eastward by about 0.5º with each cycle). At some point, eclipses are no longer possible and the series terminates (Sun leaves the beginning of the node). An arbitrary solar saros series was designated as solar saros series 1 by compilers of eclipse statistics. This series has finished, but the eclipse of November 16, 1990 BC (Julian calendar) for example is in solar saros series 1. There are different saros series for solar and lunar eclipses. For lunar saros series, the lunar eclipse occurring 58.5 synodic months earlier (February 23, 1994 BC) was assigned the number 1. If there is an eclipse one inex (29 years minus about 20 days) after an eclipse of a particular saros series then it is a member of the next series. For example, the eclipse of October 26, 1961 BC is in solar saros series 2. Saros series, of course, went on before these dates, and it is necessary to extend the saros series numbers backwards to negative numbers even just to accommodate eclipses occurring in the years following 2000 BC (up till the last eclipse with a negative saros number in 1367 BC). It takes between 1226 and 1550 years for the members of a saros series to traverse the Earth's surface from north to south (or vice versa). These extremes allow from 69 to 87 eclipses in each series (most series have 71 or 72 eclipses). From 39 to 59 (mostly about 43) eclipses in a given series will be central (that is, total, annular, or hybrid). At any given time, approximately 40 different saros series will be in progress.

Saros series, as mentioned, are numbered according to the type of eclipse (lunar or solar). In odd numbered series (for solar eclipses) the Sun is near the ascending node, whereas in even numbered series it is near the descending node (this is reversed for lunar eclipse saros series). Generally, the ordering of these series determines the time at which each series peaks, which corresponds to when an eclipse is closest to one of the lunar nodes. For solar eclipses, the 40 series numbered between 117 and 156 are active (series 117 will end in 2054), whereas for lunar eclipses, there are now 41 active saros series numbered between 110 and 150 (series 110 will end in 2027). These numbers can be derived by counting the number of eclipses listed over an 18-year (saros) period from the eclipse catalog sites.

=== Example ===
Saros 131 lunar eclipse dates
May 10, 1427 (Julian calendar)	First penumbral (southern edge of shadow)
...6 intervening penumbral eclipses omitted...
July 25, 1553 (Julian calendar)	First partial
...19 intervening partial eclipses omitted...
March 22, 1932; Final partial	12:32 UT
April 2, 1950; First total	20:44 UT
April 13, 1968	04:47 UT
April 24, 1986	12:43 UT
May 4, 2004	20:30 UT
May 16, 2022; First central	04:11 UT
May 26, 2040	11:45 UT
June 6, 2058	19:14 UT
June 17, 2076; Central	02:37 UT
...6 intervening total eclipses omitted...
September 3, 2202; Last total	05:59 UT
September 13, 2220	First partial
...18 intervening partial eclipses omitted...
April 9, 2563	Last partial umbral
...7 intervening penumbral eclipses omitted...
July 7, 2707	Last penumbral (northern edge of shadow)

As an example of a single saros series, this table gives the dates of some of the 72 lunar eclipses for saros series 131. This eclipse series began in AD 1427 with a partial eclipse at the southern edge of the Earth's shadow when the Moon was close to its descending node. In each successive saros, the Moon's orbital path is shifted northward with respect to the Earth's shadow, with the first total eclipse occurring in 1950. For the following 252 years, total eclipses occur, with the central eclipse in 2078. The first partial eclipse after this will occur in the year 2220, and the final partial eclipse of the series will occur in 2707. The total lifetime of lunar saros series 131 is 1280 years. Solar saros 138 interleaves with this lunar saros with an event occurring every 9 years 5 days alternating between each saros series.

Because of the 1/3 fraction of days in a saros, the visibility of each eclipse will differ for an observer at a given locale. For the lunar saros series 131, the first total eclipse of 1950 had its best visibility for viewers in Eastern Europe and the Middle East because mid-eclipse was at 20:44 UT. The following eclipse in the series occurred about 8 hours later in the day with mid-eclipse at 4:47 UT, and was best seen from North America and South America. The third total eclipse occurred about 8 hours later in the day than the second eclipse with mid-eclipse at 12:43 UT, and had its best visibility for viewers in the Western Pacific, East Asia, Australia and New Zealand. This cycle of visibility repeats from the start to the end of the series, with minor variations. Solar saros 138 interleaves with this lunar saros with an event occurring every 9 years 5 days alternating between each saros series.

For a similar example for solar saros see solar saros 136.

== Relationship between lunar and solar saros (sar) ==
After a given lunar or solar eclipse, after 9 years and 5 1/2 days (a half saros, or sar) an eclipse will occur that is lunar instead of solar, or vice versa, with similar properties.

For example, if the Moon's penumbra partially covers the southern limb of the Earth during a solar eclipse, 9 years and 5 1/2 days later a lunar eclipse will occur in which the Moon is partially covered by the southern limb of the Earth's penumbra. Likewise, 9 years and 5 1/2 days after a total solar eclipse or an annular solar eclipse occurs, a total lunar eclipse will also occur. This 9-year period is referred to as a sar. It includes 111 1/2 synodic months, or 111 synodic months plus one fortnight. The fortnight accounts for the alternation between solar and lunar eclipse. For a visual example see this chart (each row is one sar apart).

== See also ==
- List of saros series for solar eclipses
- List of saros series for lunar eclipses
- Eclipse cycle
- Exeligmos
- Inex
- Solar eclipse
- Lunar eclipse
- Metonic cycle

== Bibliography ==
- Jean Meeus and Hermann Mucke (1983) Canon of Lunar Eclipses. Astronomisches Büro, Vienna
- Theodor von Oppolzer (1887). Canon der Finsternisse. Vienna
- Jean Meeus, Mathematical Astronomy Morsels, Willmann-Bell, Inc., 1997 (Chapter 9, p. 51, Table 9. A Some eclipse Periodicities)
