= List of solar eclipses in the 20th century =

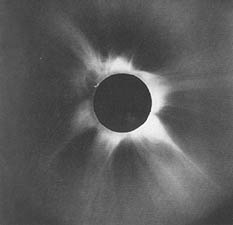
Total solar eclipse of June 8, 1937, from Kanton Island.

During the 20th century, there were 228 solar eclipses of which 78 were partial, 73 were annular, 71 were total and 6 were hybrids between total and annular eclipses. Of these, two annular and three total eclipses were non-central, in the sense that the very center (axis) of the Moon's shadow will miss the Earth (for more information see gamma). In the 20th century, the greatest number of eclipses in one year is five, in 1935, though the years 1917, 1946, 1964, 1982 and 2000 had four eclipses each. One month, July 2000, featured two solar eclipses, on July 1 and July 31. The predictions given here are by Fred Espenak of NASA's Goddard Space Flight Center.

The longest measured duration in which the Moon completely covered the Sun, known as totality, was during the solar eclipse of June 20, 1955. This total solar eclipse had a maximum duration of 7 minutes and 7.74 seconds. The longest possible duration of a total solar eclipse is 7 minutes and 32 seconds. The longest annular solar eclipse of the 20th century took place on December 14, 1955, with a duration of 12 minutes and 9.17 seconds. The maximum possible duration is 12 minutes and 29 seconds. Two instances of back-to-back hybrid solar eclipses within a period of less than six months occurred in the 20th century. The eclipse of June 17, 1909, was the second hybrid eclipse in the span of less than one year, the first one being on December 23, 1908, and the eclipse of March 29, 1987, was the second hybrid eclipse in the span of less than one year, the first one being on October 3, 1986.^{[a]}

The table contains the date and time of the greatest eclipse (in dynamical time), which in this case is the time when the axis of the Moon's shadow cone passes closest to the centre of Earth; this is in (Ephemeris Time). The number of the saros series that the eclipse belongs to is given, followed by the type of the eclipse (either total, annular, partial or hybrid), the gamma of the eclipse (how centrally the shadow of the Moon strikes the Earth), and the magnitude of the eclipse (the fraction of the Sun's diameter obscured by the Moon). For total and annular eclipses, the duration of the eclipse is given, as well as the location of the greatest eclipse (the point of maximum eclipse) and the path width of the total or annular eclipse. The geographical areas from which the eclipse can be seen are listed along with a chart illustrating each eclipse's respective path.

== Notable eclipses of the 20th century ==
- May 29, 1919: this total eclipse was photographed by Arthur Eddington to verify general relativity (see Eddington experiment)
- June 20, 1955: longest total eclipse between 1901 and 2000, lasting a maximum of 7 minutes and 8 seconds^{[a]}
- June 30, 1973: a Concorde jet flew along the path, thereby extending the length of totality to 74 min.
- March 29, 1987: second hybrid eclipse in less than one year, the first being on October 3, 1986.
- July 11, 1991: solar eclipse with the shortest gamma, of only −0.00412.
- July 31, 2000: the second solar eclipse within one calendar month, the first being on July 1, 2000.

== Eclipses ==
Date	Time of greatest eclipse (Terrestrial Time)	Saros	Type	Gamma	Magnitude	Central duration (min:s)	Location	Path width		Geographical area	Chart	Ref(s)
Date	Time of greatest eclipse (Terrestrial Time)	Saros	Type	Gamma	Magnitude	Central duration (min:s)	Location	km	mi	Geographical area	Chart	Ref(s)
May 18, 1901	5:33:48	136	Total	−0.3626	1.068	6:29	1.7°S 98.4°E	238	148	Total: French Madagascar, Réunion, British Mauritius, Dutch East Indies and British New Guinea Partial: East Africa, South Asia, Southeast Asia, Australia, Western Oceania		^{[a]}
November 11, 1901	7:28:21	141	Annular	0.4758	0.9216	11:01	10.8°N 68.9°E	336	209	Annular: Sicily, British Malta, Ottoman Tripolitania, Egypt, Ottoman Empire, Emirate of Jabal Shammar, Aden Protectorate, Muscat and Oman, British Raj, British Ceylon, Siam, French Indochina, Bombay Reef in the Paracel Islands and Philippines Partial: North Africa, East Africa, Asia, Northern Australia		^{[a]}
April 8, 1902	14:05:06	108	Partial	1.5024	0.0643	—	71.7°N 142.4°W	—		Partial: Northern Canada		^{[a]}
May 7, 1902	22:34:16	146	Partial	−1.0831	0.8593	—	70.0°S 125.1°W	—		Partial: Eastern Oceania		^{[a]}
October 31, 1902	8:00:18	151	Partial	1.1556	0.696	—	70.8°N 100.8°E	—		Partial: Northern Europe, Eastern Europe, Northern Middle East, South Asia, East Asia, North Asia		^{[a]}
March 29, 1903	1:35:23	118	Annular	0.8413	0.9767	1:53	56.2°N 130.3°E	153	95	Annular: China, Russia and Northern Canada Partial: Southeast Asia, East Asia, North Asia, Alaska, Northwestern North America		^{[a]}
September 21, 1903	4:39:52	123	Total	−0.8967	1.0316	2:12	58.0°S 77.2°E	241	150	Total: Antarctica Partial: Southeast Africa, Southern Australia, New Zealand, Antarctica		^{[a]}
March 17, 1904	5:40:44	128	Annular	0.1299	0.9367	8:07	5.6°N 94.7°E	237	147	Annular: German East Africa, Portuguese East Africa, Grande Comore Island, British Seychelles, Sumatra, Siam, French Indochina, the Paracel Islands and the American Philippines Partial: East Africa, South Asia, Southeast Asia, East Asia		^{[a]}
September 9, 1904	20:44:21	133	Total	−0.1625	1.0709	6:20	3.7°S 134.5°W	234	145	Total: German New Guinea and Chile Partial: Oceania, Western South America		^{[a]}
March 6, 1905	5:12:26	138	Annular	−0.5768	0.9269	7:58	39.5°S 117.4°E	334	208	Annular: Australia, New Caledonia and New Hebrides Partial: Madagascar, Antarctica, Australia, Oceania		^{[a]}
August 30, 1905	13:07:26	143	Total	0.5708	1.0477	3:46	42.5°N 4.3°W	192	119	Total: Canada, Spain, French Algeria, French Tunisia, Ottoman Tripolitania, Egypt, Ottoman Empire, Aden Protectorate and Muscat and Oman Partial: Eastern North America, Europe, North Africa, Central Africa, West Asia		^{[a]}
February 23, 1906	7:43:20	148	Partial	−1.2479	0.5386	—	71.4°S 170.3°W	—		Partial: Antarctica, Southern Australia		^{[a]}
July 21, 1906	13:14:19	115	Partial	−1.3637	0.3355	—	68.6°S 33.3°W	—		Partial: Argentina and Chile		^{[a]}
August 20, 1906	1:12:50	153	Partial	1.3731	0.3147	—	70.8°N 66.4°W	—		Partial: Northern Russia, Alaska, Western Canada, Pacific Northwest		^{[a]}
January 14, 1907	6:05:43	120	Total	0.8628	1.0281	2:25	38.3°N 86.4°E	189	117	Total: Russian Empire and China Partial: Asia		^{[a]}
July 10, 1907	15:24:32	125	Annular	−0.6313	0.9456	7:23	16.9°S 50.9°W	258	160	Annular: Chile, Bolivia and Brazil Partial: South America, Southern Central America		^{[a]}
January 3, 1908	21:45:22	130	Total	0.1934	1.0437	4:14	11.8°S 145.1°W	149	93	Total: Line and Phoenix Islands and Costa Rica Partial: Northern Oceania, Hawaii, Southern North America, Central America, Western Caribbean, Western South America		^{[a]}
June 28, 1908	16:29:51	135	Annular	0.1389	0.9655	4:00	31.4°N 67.2°W	126	78	Annular: Mexico, Florida, Mauritania, Senegal, French Sudan, Upper Volta and British Gold Coast Partial: Northern South America, North America, Caribbean, West Africa, North Africa, Western Europe		^{[a]}
December 23, 1908	11:44:28	140	Hybrid	−0.4985	1.0024	0:12	54.3°S 0.5°W	10	6.2	Annular: Chile, Argentina, Uruguay and Brazil Partial: South America, Antarctica, Southern Africa		^{[a]}
June 17, 1909	23:18:38	145	Hybrid	0.8957	1.0065	0:24	89.2°N 123.6°E	51	32	Total: Russia, Ellesmere Island and Greenland Partial: East Asia, Northern North America		^{[a]}
December 12, 1909	19:44:48	150	Partial	−1.2456	0.5424	—	65.0°S 86.0°E	—		Partial: Antarctica, New Zealand		^{[a]}
May 9, 1910	5:42:13	117	Total	−0.9437	1.06	4:15	48.2°S 125.2°E	594	369	Total: Wilkes Land and Tasmania Partial: Antarctica, Australia, Southeast Asia		^{[a]}
November 2, 1910	2:08:32	122	Partial	1.0603	0.8515	—	61.9°N 155.1°W	—		Partial: Northeast Asia, Alaska, Hawaii		^{[a]}
April 28, 1911	22:27:22	127	Total	−0.2294	1.0562	4:57	1.9°N 151.9°W	190	120	Total: Australia, Tonga, American Samoa and Cook Islands Partial: Oceania, Southern North America, Central America, Western Caribbean		^{[a]}
October 22, 1911	4:13:02	132	Annular	0.3224	0.965	3:47	6.3°N 121.4°E	133	83	Annular: Russian Empire, China, French Indochina, Papua, Solomon and Ellice Islands Partial: South Asia, Southeast Asia, East Asia, Australia, Oceania		^{[a]}
April 17, 1912	11:34:22	137	Hybrid	0.528	1.0003	0:02	38.4°N 11.3°W	1	0.62	Total: Portugal and Spain Annular: Venezuela, Brazil, British Guyana, Dutch Guiana, France, Belgium, Netherlands, Germany and Russian Empire; Partial: Eastern South America, Eastern North America, West Africa, Europe, West Asia		^{[a]}
October 10, 1912	13:36:14	142	Total	−0.4149	1.0229	1:55	28.1°S 40.1°W	85	53	Total: Ecuador, Colombia, Peru and Brazil Partial: Central America, Caribbean, South America, Antarctica, Southern Africa		^{[a]}
April 6, 1913	17:33:07	147	Partial	1.3147	0.4244	—	61.2°N 175.7°E	—		Partial: Eastern Russia, Northwestern North America		^{[a]}
August 31, 1913	20:52:12	114	Partial	1.4512	0.1513	—	61.5°N 26.8°W	—		Partial: Eastern Canada, Greenland		^{[a]}
September 30, 1913	4:45:49	152	Partial	−1.1005	0.8252	—	61.0°S 11.6°E	—		Partial: Southern Africa, Antarctica		^{[a]}
February 25, 1914	0:13:01	119	Annular	−0.9416	0.9248	5:35	62.1°S 113.3°W	839	521	Annular: Antarctica Partial: Antarctica, New Zealand, Southern South America		^{[a]}
August 21, 1914	12:34:27	124	Total	0.7655	1.0328	2:14	54.5°N 27.1°E	170	110	Total: Canada, Greenland, Norway, Sweden, Russian Empire, Ottoman Empire, Persia and British Raj Partial: Northeast North America, Europe, North Africa, East Africa, Middle East		^{[a]}
February 14, 1915	4:33:20	129	Annular	−0.2024	0.9789	2:04	24.0°S 120.7°E	77	48	Annular: Australia, Papua and German New Guinea Partial: Antarctica, Australia, Oceania, Southeast Asia		^{[a]}
August 10, 1915	22:52:25	134	Annular	0.0124	0.9853	1:33	16.4°N 161.4°W	52	32	Annular: Pacific Ocean Partial: Northeast Asia, Northern Oceania, Hawaii		^{[a]}
February 3, 1916	16:00:21	139	Total	0.4987	1.028	2:36	11.1°N 67.7°W	108	67	Total: Colombia, Venezuela, Guadeloupe, Saint Martin and Saint Barthélemy Partial: North America, Central America, Northern South America, Northwest Africa, Western Europe		^{[a]}
July 30, 1916	2:06:10	144	Annular	−0.7709	0.9447	6:24	29.0°S 132.4°E	313	194	Annular: Australia Partial: Southeast Asia, Australia, Oceania, Antarctica		^{[a]}
December 24, 1916	20:46:22	111	Partial	−1.5321	0.0114	—	65.7°S 32.1°E	—		Partial: Antarctica		^{[a]}
January 23, 1917	7:28:31	149	Partial	1.1508	0.7254	—	62.3°N 25.6°E	—		Partial: Northeast Africa, Europe, West Asia, Central Asia		^{[a]}
June 19, 1917	13:16:21	116	Partial	1.2857	0.4729	—	66.2°N 150.1°E	—		Partial: Northern North America, Northern Europe, North Asia		^{[a]}
July 19, 1917	2:42:42	154	Partial	−1.5101	0.0863	—	63.7°S 101.8°E	—		Partial: Antarctica		^{[a]}
December 14, 1917	9:27:20	121	Annular	−0.9157	0.9791	1:17	88.0°S 124.8°E	189	117	Annular: Antarctica Partial: Antarctica, Southern South America, Australia		^{[a]}
June 8, 1918	22:07:43	126	Total	0.4658	1.0292	2:23	50.9°N 152.0°W	112	70	Total: Washington, Oregon, Idaho, Utah, Wyoming, Colorado, Kansas, Oklahoma, Arkansas, Louisiana, Mississippi, Alabama and Florida Partial: Northeast Asia, North America		^{[a]}
December 3, 1918	15:22:02	131	Annular	−0.2387	0.9383	7:06	36.1°S 53.7°W	236	147	Annular: Chile, Argentina, Uruguay, South West Africa and Portuguese Angola Partial: South America, Antarctica, Southern Africa, Central Africa		^{[a]}
May 29, 1919	13:08:55	136	Total	−0.2955	1.0719	6:51	4.4°N 16.7°W	244	152	Total: Peru, Chile, Bolivia, Brazil, Liberia, Ivory Coast, Principe, Río Muni, French Equatorial Africa, Belgian Congo, Rhodesia, German East Africa, Nyasaland and Mozambique Partial: South America, Africa		^{[a]}
November 22, 1919	15:14:12	141	Annular	0.4549	0.9198	11:37	6.9°N 48.9°W	341	212	Annular: Texas, Cuba, Haiti, Dominican Republic, Venezuela, Saint Vincent and the Grenadines, Barbados, the Gambia, Senegal, French Guinea, Mauritania, French Sudan Partial: North America, Caribbean, Northern South America, West Africa, Western Europe		^{[a]}
May 18, 1920	6:14:55	146	Partial	−1.0239	0.9734	—	69.1°S 107.7°E	—		Partial: Australia, Antarctica		^{[a]}
November 10, 1920	15:52:15	151	Partial	1.1287	0.742	—	69.9°N 29.8°W	—		Partial: Canada, United States, Northwest Africa, Western Europe		^{[a]}
April 8, 1921	9:15:01	118	Annular	0.8869	0.9753	1:50	64.5°N 5.6°E	192	119	Annular: Scotland, Norway Partial: North Africa, Europe, Central Asia, Russian SFSR		^{[a]}
October 1, 1921	12:35:58	123	Total	−0.9383	1.0293	1:52	66.1°S 56.1°W	291	181	Total: Antarctica Partial: South America, Antarctica		^{[a]}
March 28, 1922	13:05:26	128	Annular	0.1711	0.9381	7:50	12.3°N 18.0°W	233	145	Annular: Peru, Brazil, French West Africa, British Gambia, French Algeria, Italian Libya, Egypt, Kingdom of Hejaz and Sultanate of Nejd, and British Kuwait Partial: South America, Caribbean, North Africa, Central Africa, Europe, Middle East		^{[a]}
September 21, 1922	4:40:31	133	Total	−0.213	1.0678	5:59	10.7°S 104.5°E	226	140	Total: Ethiopia, Italian Somaliland and Australia Partial: East Africa, South Asia, Southeast Asia, Australia, Oceania		^{[a]}
March 17, 1923	12:44:58	138	Annular	−0.5438	0.931	7:51	33.0°S 2.4°E	305	190	Annular: Chile, Argentina, Falkland Islands, South West Africa, Bechuanaland Protectorate, Southern Rhodesia, Portuguese Mozambique, Nyasaland and French Madagascar Partial: Southern South America, Southern Africa, Central Africa, Antarctica		^{[a]}
September 10, 1923	20:47:29	143	Total	0.5149	1.043	3:37	34.7°N 121.8°W	167	104	Total: Shiashkotan, California, Mexico and British Honduras Partial: Far East Russia, North America, Central America, Caribbean, Northern South America		^{[a]}
March 5, 1924	15:44:20	148	Partial	−1.2232	0.5819	—	71.9°S 55.6°E	—		Partial: Antarctica, Southern Africa		^{[a]}
July 31, 1924	19:58:20	115	Partial	−1.4459	0.192	—	69.6°S 146.0°W	—		Partial: None		^{[a]}
August 30, 1924	8:23:00	153	Partial	1.3123	0.4245	—	71.5°N 172.9°E	—		Partial: Greenland, Russian SFSR, Northeast Asia		^{[a]}
January 24, 1925	14:54:03	120	Total	0.8661	1.0304	2:32	40.5°N 49.6°W	206	128	Total: Minnesota, Wisconsin, Michigan, Ontario, Pennsylvania, New York, New Jersey, Connecticut, Rhode Island and Massachusetts Partial: North America, Central America, Caribbean, Northern South America, West Africa, Western Europe		^{[a]}
July 20, 1925	21:48:42	125	Annular	−0.7193	0.9436	7:15	25.3°S 150.0°W	300	190	Annular: New Zealand and French Polynesia Partial: Eastern Australia, Oceania		^{[a]}
January 14, 1926	6:36:58	130	Total	0.1973	1.043	4:11	10.1°S 82.3°E	147	91	Total: French Equatorial Africa, Belgian Congo, Anglo-Egyptian Sudan, British Uganda, British Kenya, Italian Somaliland, British Seychelles, Dutch East Indies, North Borneo and Philippines Partial: East Africa, Middle East, South Asia, Southeast Asia, East Asia, Australia		^{[a]}
July 9, 1926	23:06:02	135	Annular	0.0538	0.968	3:51	25.6°N 165.1°W	115	71	Annular: Pulo Anna and Merir, Wake Island and Midway Atoll Partial: Northeast Asia, Northern Oceania, Hawaii, Southern North America, Central America		^{[a]}
January 3, 1927	20:22:53	140	Annular	−0.4956	0.9995	0:03	52.8°S 124.8°W	2	1.2	Annular: New Zealand, Chile, Argentina, Uruguay and Brazil Partial: Oceania, Antarctica, South America		^{[a]}
June 29, 1927	6:23:27	145	Total	0.8163	1.0128	0:50	78.1°N 73.8°E	77	48	Total: United Kingdom, Norway, Sweden, Finland, Soviet Union and Amukta Partial: Europe, North Africa, North Asia, Northern North America		^{[a]}
December 24, 1927	3:59:41	150	Partial	−1.2416	0.549	—	66.1°S 47.7°W	—		Partial: Antarctica		^{[a]}
May 19, 1928	13:24:20	117	Total (non-central)	1.0048	1.014	—	63.3°S 22.5°E	—		Total: None Partial: Extreme Southern South America, Southern Africa		^{[a]}
June 17, 1928	20:27:28	155	Partial	1.5107	0.0375	—	65.6°N 70.6°E	—		Partial: Northern Soviet Union		^{[a]}
November 12, 1928	9:48:24	122	Partial	1.0861	0.8078	—	62.6°N 81.1°E	—		Partial: Northeast Africa, Europe, West Asia, Central Asia, South Asia		^{[a]}
May 9, 1929	6:10:34	127	Total	−0.2887	1.0562	5:07	1.6°N 92.7°E	193	120	Total: Dutch East Indies, Federated Malay States, Siam, French Indochina and Philippines Partial: Southeast Africa, South Asia, Southeast Asia, East Asia, Australia		^{[a]}
November 1, 1929	12:05:10	132	Annular	0.3514	0.9649	3:54	4.5°N 3.1°E	134	83	Annular: Spanish Sahara, French West Africa, British Gold Coast, French Togoland, Portuguese São Tomé and Príncipe, French Equatorial Africa, Belgian Congo, Northern Rhodesia, British Tanganyika and British Seychelles Partial: Africa, Europe, Middle East		^{[a]}
April 28, 1930	19:03:34	137	Hybrid	0.473	1.0003	0:01	39.4°N 121.2°W	1	0.62	Total: California, Nevada, Oregon, Idaho and Montana Annular: Montana, Canada and Dominion of Newfoundland; Partial: Hawaii, North America, Northern Soviet Union		^{[a]}
October 21, 1930	21:43:53	142	Total	−0.3804	1.023	1:55	30.5°S 161.1°W	84	52	Total: Niuafoʻou, Chile and Santa Cruz Province, Argentina Partial: Australia, Oceania, Antarctica, Southern South America		^{[a]}
April 18, 1931	0:45:35	147	Partial	1.2643	0.5107	—	61.5°N 58.9°E	—		Partial: East Asia, North Asia		^{[a]}
September 12, 1931	4:41:25	114	Partial	1.506	0.0471	—	61.2°N 152.8°W	—		Partial: Alaska		^{[a]}
October 11, 1931	12:55:40	152	Partial	−1.0607	0.9005	—	61.2°S 119.5°W	—		Partial: Southern and Central South America, Antarctica		^{[a]}
March 7, 1932	7:55:50	119	Annular	−0.9673	0.9277	5:19	60.7°S 134.4°E	1,083	673	Annular: Antarctica and Tasmania Partial: Antarctica, Australia, Southeast Asia		^{[a]}
August 31, 1932	20:03:41	124	Total	0.8307	1.0257	1:45	54.5°N 79.5°W	155	96	Total: Northwest Territories, Quebec, Vermont, New Hampshire, Maine and Massachusetts Partial: Far East Soviet Union, North America, Central America, Caribbean, Northern South America		^{[a]}
February 24, 1933	12:46:39	129	Annular	−0.2191	0.9841	1:32	20.8°S 2.1°W	58	36	Annular: Chile, Argentina, Portuguese Angola, French Equatorial Africa, Belgian Congo, Anglo-Egyptian Sudan, Ethiopia, French Somaliland, Italian Eritrea and British Raj Partial: Southern and Central South America, Antarctica, Africa, Middle East		^{[a]}
August 21, 1933	5:49:11	134	Annular	0.0869	0.9801	2:04	16.9°N 95.9°E	71	44	Annular: Italian Libya, Egypt, Mandatory Palestine, French Mandate for Syria and the Lebanon, Iraq, Persia, Afghanistan, British Raj, Siam, Dutch East Indies, North Borneo and Australia Partial: Northeast Africa, Eastern Europe, Asia, Australia		^{[a]}
February 14, 1934	0:38:41	139	Total	0.4868	1.0321	2:53	13.2°N 161.7°E	123	76	Total: Dutch East Indies, North Borneo and the South Seas Mandate Partial: East Asia, Southeast Asia, Australia, Northern Oceania, Hawaii, Western North America		^{[a]}
August 10, 1934	8:37:48	144	Annular	−0.689	0.9436	6:33	24.5°S 34.6°E	280	170	Annular: Portuguese West Africa, South West Africa, Rhodesia, Bechuanaland Protectorate, Mozambique, Transvaal and Swaziland Partial: Southern Africa, Central Africa, East Africa, Antarctica		^{[a]}
January 5, 1935	5:35:46	111	Partial	−1.5381	0.0013	—	64.7°S 110.2°W	—		Partial: None		^{[a]}
February 3, 1935	16:16:20	149	Partial	1.1438	0.739	—	62.5°N 115.4°W	—		Partial: North America		^{[a]}
June 30, 1935	19:59:46	116	Partial	1.3623	0.3375	—	65.2°N 39.1°E	—		Partial: Northern Europe, Northern Soviet Union, Greenland		^{[a]}
July 30, 1935	9:16:28	154	Partial	−1.4259	0.2315	—	62.9°S 5.9°W	—		Partial: Antarctica		^{[a]}
December 25, 1935	17:59:52	121	Annular	−0.9228	0.9752	1:30	83.5°S 9.4°E	234	145	Annular: Antarctica Partial: Antarctica, Southern South America, New Zealand		^{[a]}
June 19, 1936	5:20:31	126	Total	0.5389	1.0329	2:31	56.1°N 104.7°E	132	82	Total: Greece, Turkey, Soviet Union, China and Hokkaido Partial: Europe, Northeast Africa, Asia, Northern North America		^{[a]}
December 13, 1936	23:28:12	131	Annular	−0.2493	0.9349	7:25	37.8°S 172.6°W	251	156	Annular: Australia, New Zealand and Oeno Island Partial: Australia, Oceania, Antarctica		^{[a]}
June 8, 1937	20:41:02	136	Total	−0.2253	1.0751	7:04	9.9°N 130.5°W	250	160	Total: Gilbert and Ellice Islands and Peru Partial: Oceania, Hawaii, Southern North America, Central America, Caribbean, Western South America		^{[a]}
December 2, 1937	23:05:45	141	Annular	0.4389	0.9184	12:00	6.9°N 48.9°W	344	214	Annular: Ogasawara, Tokyo, South Seas Mandate and Gilbert and Ellice Islands Partial: East Asia, Northern Oceania, Hawaii, Western North America		^{[a]}
May 29, 1938	13:50:19	146	Total	−0.9607	1.0552	4:05	52.7°S 22.0°W	675	419	Total: South Orkney Islands, South Georgia, Zavodovski Island and Visokoi Island Partial: Southern and Central South America, Southern Africa		^{[a]}
November 21, 1938	23:52:25	151	Partial	1.1077	0.7781	—	68.9°N 162.0°W	—		Partial: Northeast Asia, Hawaii, Western North America		^{[a]}
April 19, 1939	16:45:53	118	Annular	0.9388	0.9731	1:49	73.1°N 129.1°W	285	177	Annular: Alaska, Canada, Franz Josef Land, Ushakov Island and Vize Island Partial: North America, Western Europe		^{[a]}
October 12, 1939	20:40:23	123	Total	−0.9737	1.0266	1:32	72.8°S 155.1°E	418	260	Total: Antarctica Partial: Eastern Australia, Oceania, Extreme Southern South America, Antarctica		^{[a]}
April 7, 1940	20:21:21	128	Annular	0.219	0.9394	7:30	19.2°N 128.5°W	230	140	Annular: Gilbert and Ellice Islands, Mexico, Texas, Louisiana, Mississippi, Alabama, Georgia, Florida and South Carolina Partial: Eastern Oceania, Hawaii, North America, Central America, Caribbean, Northern South America		^{[a]}
October 1, 1940	12:44:06	133	Total	−0.2573	1.0645	5:35	17.5°S 18.2°W	218	135	Total: Colombia, Brazil, Venezuela and South Africa Partial: Caribbean, South America, Central Africa, Southern Africa		^{[a]}
March 27, 1941	20:08:08	138	Annular	−0.5025	0.9355	7:41	26.2°S 110.9°W	276	171	Annular: Peru, Bolivia and Brazil Partial: Oceania, Central America, Caribbean, Western South America, Antarctica		^{[a]}
September 21, 1941	4:34:03	143	Total	0.4649	1.0379	3:22	27.3°N 119.1°E	143	89	Total: Soviet Union, China, Taiwan, Okinawa Prefecture and South Seas Mandate Partial: Asia, Northern Australia, Northern Oceania		^{[a]}
March 16, 1942	23:37:07	148	Partial	−1.1908	0.6393	—	72.2°S 76.8°E	—		Partial: Antarctica, Southern Oceania		^{[a]}
August 12, 1942	2:45:12	115	Partial	−1.5244	0.0561	—	70.4°S 99.9°E	—		Partial: Antarctica		^{[a]}
September 10, 1942	15:39:32	153	Partial	1.2571	0.523	—	71.9°N 50.0°E	—		Partial: Northern North America, Europe, North Africa		^{[a]}
February 4, 1943	23:38:10	120	Total	0.8734	1.0331	2:39	43.6°N 175.1°E	229	142	Total: China, Primorsky Krai, Hokkaido, Kunashir Island, Alaska and Yukon Partial: East Asia, Hawaii, Western North America		^{[a]}
August 1, 1943	4:16:13	125	Annular	−0.8041	0.9409	6:59	34.8°S 108.6°E	367	228	Annular: Île Amsterdam Partial: Madagascar, Australia, Indonesia, Malaysia and Wilkes Land		^{[a]}
January 25, 1944	15:26:42	130	Total	0.2025	1.0428	4:09	7.6°S 50.2°W	146	91	Total: Peru, Brazil, British Sierra Leone and French West Africa Partial: Southern North America, Central America, Caribbean, South America, Western Europe, West Africa, Central Africa		^{[a]}
July 20, 1944	5:43:13	135	Annular	−0.0314	0.97	3:42	19.0°N 95.7°E	108	67	Annular: British Uganda, Anglo-Egyptian Sudan, British Kenya, Ethiopia, British Somaliland, British Raj, Burma, Thailand, French Indochina, Philippines and the Territory of New Guinea Partial: East Africa, West Asia, Central Asia, South Asia, Southeast Asia, East Asia, Australia		^{[a]}
January 14, 1945	5:01:43	140	Annular	−0.4937	0.997	0:15	51.1°S 110.3°E	12	7.5	Annular: Eastern Cape, Tasmania and Furneaux Group Partial: Southern Africa, Antarctica, Australia, Oceania		^{[a]}
July 9, 1945	13:27:46	145	Total	0.7356	1.018	1:15	70.0°N 17.2°W	92	57	Total: Oregon, Idaho, Montana, Canada, Greenland, Scandinavia, Soviet Union and Central Asia Partial: North America, Europe, North Africa, West Asia, Soviet Union		^{[a]}
January 3, 1946	12:16:11	150	Partial	−1.2392	0.5529	—	67.1°S 177.6°E	—		Partial: Antarctica, Extreme Southern South America		^{[a]}
May 30, 1946	21:00:24	117	Partial	−1.0711	0.8865	—	64.1°S 101.0°W	—		Partial: Eastern Oceania, Western South America		^{[a]}
June 29, 1946	3:51:58	155	Partial	1.4361	0.1802	—	66.6°N 50.8°W	—		Partial: Northern Europe, Greenland, Canada		^{[a]}
November 23, 1946	17:37:12	122	Partial	1.105	0.7758	—	63.4°N 45.3°W	—		Partial: Canada, United States, Caribbean, Northern South America		^{[a]}
May 20, 1947	13:47:47	127	Total	−0.3528	1.0557	5:13	0.2°N 21.4°W	196	122	Total: Chile, Argentina, Paraguay, Brazil, Liberia, French West Africa, British Gold Coast, French Togoland, British Nigeria, French Cameroons, French Equatorial Africa, Belgian Congo, British Uganda, British Tanganyika and British Kenya Partial: South America, Africa		^{[a]}
November 12, 1947	20:05:37	132	Annular	0.3743	0.965	3:59	3.0°N 117.4°W	135	84	Annular: Peru, Ecuador, Colombia and Brazil Partial: Hawaii, North America, Central America, Caribbean, Western South America		^{[a]}
May 9, 1948	2:26:04	137	Annular	0.4133	0.9999	0:00	39.8°N 131.2°E	0.2	0.12	Annular: Car Nicobar, Burma, Siam, French Indochina, North Vietnam, China, South Korea, Rebun Island, Kuril Islands and Alaska Partial: South Asia, Southeast Asia, East Asia, Northeast Asia, Alaska, Northwest Canada		^{[a]}
November 1, 1948	5:59:18	142	Total	−0.3517	1.0231	1:56	33.1°S 76.2°E	84	52	Total: Belgian Congo, Uganda Protectorate, British Kenya, British Seychelles and British Mauritius Partial: East Africa, Southern Africa, Antarctica, Australia		^{[a]}
April 28, 1949	7:48:53	147	Partial	1.2068	0.6092	—	61.9°N 55.7°W	—		Partial: North Africa, Europe, Soviet Union, Greenland, Northern Canada		^{[a]}
October 21, 1949	21:13:01	152	Partial	−1.027	0.9638	—	61.5°S 107.5°E	—		Partial: Australia, Oceania, Antarctica		^{[a]}
March 18, 1950	15:32:01	119	Annular (non-central)	0.9988	0.962	—	60.9°S 40.9°E	—		Annular: Antarctica Partial: Extreme Southern South America, Antarctica, Southern Africa		^{[a]}
September 12, 1950	3:38:47	124	Total	0.8903	1.0182	1:45	54.8°N 172.3°E	134	83	Total: Soviet Union and the Semichi Islands Partial: Northeast Asia, Alaska, Hawaii, Northwest Canada		^{[a]}
March 7, 1951	20:53:40	129	Annular	−0.242	0.9896	0:59	17.7°S 123.5°W	38	24	Annular: New Zealand, Costa Rica, Nicaragua and San Andrés Island Partial: Oceania, Western South America, Southern North America, Central America, Caribbean		^{[a]}
September 1, 1951	12:51:51	134	Annular	0.1557	0.9747	2:36	16.5°N 8.5°W	91	57	Annular: Tennessee, North Carolina, Virginia, Spanish Sahara, French West Africa, British Gold Coast, French Equatorial Africa, Belgian Congo, Northern Rhodesia, Portuguese Mozambique, Nyasaland and French Madagascar Partial: Eastern North America, Caribbean, Northern South America, Europe, Africa		^{[a]}
February 25, 1952	9:11:35	139	Total	0.4697	1.0366	3:09	15.6°N 32.7°E	138	86	Total: French Equatorial Africa, Belgian Congo, Anglo-Egyptian Sudan, Arabia, Persia and the Soviet Union Partial: Africa, Europe, West Asia, Central Asia, South Asia		^{[a]}
August 20, 1952	15:13:35	144	Annular	−0.6102	0.942	6:40	21.7°S 64.1°W	280	170	Annular: Peru, Chile, Bolivia, Argentina, Paraguay, Brazil and Uruguay Partial: Central America, Caribbean, South America		^{[a]}
February 14, 1953	0:59:30	149	Partial	1.1331	0.7596	—	61.9°N 104.9°E	—		Partial: East Asia, Northeast Asia, Alaska		^{[a]}
July 11, 1953	2:44:14	116	Partial	1.4388	0.2015	—	64.3°N 71.7°W	—		Partial: Canada, Greenland, Pacific Northwest		^{[a]}
August 9, 1953	15:55:03	154	Partial	−1.344	0.3729	—	62.2°S 114.7°W	—		Partial: Antarctica, Extreme Southern South America		^{[a]}
January 5, 1954	2:32:01	121	Annular	−0.9296	0.972	1:42	79.1°S 120.8°W	278	173	Annular: Antarctica Partial: Antarctica, Oceania		^{[a]}
June 30, 1954	12:32:38	126	Total	0.6135	1.0357	2:35	60.5°N 4.2°E	153	95	Total: Nebraska, South Dakota, Minnesota, Wisconsin, Canada, Greenland, Iceland, Norway, Sweden, eastern Europe, Iran, Afghanistan, Pakistan and India Partial: Eastern North America, Europe, North Africa, West Asia, Central Asia, South Asia		^{[a]}
December 25, 1954	7:36:42	131	Annular	−0.2576	0.9323	7:39	38.4°S 68.2°E	262	163	Annular: South West Africa, South Africa, Indonesia and Portuguese Timor Partial: Southern Africa, Antarctica, Southeast Asia, Australia		^{[a]}
June 20, 1955	4:10:42	136	Total	−0.1528	1.0776	7:08	14.8°N 117.0°E	254	158	Total: British Seychelles, crossing Ceylon, Burma, Thailand, Cambodia, Laos, South Vietnam, Paracel Islands, the Philippines, Nukumanu Islands, Ontong Java Atoll Partial: South Asia, Southeast Asia, East Asia, Australia, Oceania		^{[a]}
December 14, 1955	7:02:25	141	Annular	0.4266	0.9176	12:09	2.1°N 72.2°E	346	215	Annular: French Equatorial Africa, Libya, Anglo-Egyptian Sudan, French Somaliland, British Somaliland, the Trust Territory of Somaliland, the Maldives, Andaman and Nicobar Islands, Burma, Thailand, Cambodia, Laos, North Vietnam and South Vietnam, China, British Hong Kong, Taiwan, and Ryukyu Islands Partial: East Africa, Asia		^{[a]}
June 8, 1956	21:20:39	146	Total	−0.8934	1.0581	4:45	40.8°S 140.7°W	429	267	Total: None Partial: Oceania		^{[a]}
December 2, 1956	8:00:35	151	Partial	1.0923	0.8047	—	67.9°N 64.6°E	—		Partial: Europe, Northeast Africa, Asia		^{[a]}
April 30, 1957	0:05:28	118	Annular (non-central)	0.9992	0.9799	—	70.6°N 40.3°E	—		Annular: Soviet Union and Bear Island Partial: East Asia, Northeast Asia, Alaska, Canada, Northwestern United States		^{[a]}
October 23, 1957	4:54:02	123	Total (non-central)	1.0022	1.0013	—	71.2°S 23.1°W	—		Total: None Partial: Southern Africa, Antarctica, New Zealand		^{[a]}
April 19, 1958	3:27:17	128	Annular	0.275	0.9408	7:07	26.5°N 123.6°E	228	142	Annular: The Maldives, Nicobar Islands, Burma, Thailand, Cambodia, Laos, North Vietnam and South Vietnam, China, British Hong Kong, Taiwan, Ryukyu Islands and Japan Partial: Asia		^{[a]}
October 12, 1958	20:55:28	133	Total	−0.2951	1.0608	5:11	24.0°S 142.4°W	209	130	Total: Tokelau, Cook Islands, French Polynesia, Chile and Argentina Partial: Eastern Australia, Oceania, Western South America		^{[a]}
April 8, 1959	3:24:08	138	Annular	−0.4546	0.9401	7:26	19.1°S 137.6°E	247	153	Annular: Australia, Milne Bay Province, British Solomon Islands, Gilbert and Ellice Islands, Tokelau and Swains Island Partial: Australia, Antarctica, Southeast Asia, Oceania		^{[a]}
October 2, 1959	12:27:00	143	Total	0.4207	1.0325	3:02	20.4°N 1.4°W	120	75	Total: Massachusetts, New Hampshire, Canary Islands, Morocco, Spanish Sahara, French Mauritania, Mali Federation, French Niger, British Nigeria, British Cameroons and French Cameroons, French Chad, French Central Africa, Sudan, Ethiopia and the Trust Territory of Somaliland Partial: Eastern North America, Eastern Caribbean, Europe, Africa, West Asia, Central Asia		^{[a]}
March 27, 1960	7:25:07	148	Partial	−1.1537	0.7058	—	72.1°S 151.9°E	—		Partial: Antarctica, Australia		^{[a]}
September 20, 1960	22:59:56	153	Partial	1.2057	0.6139	—	72.1°N 74.1°W	—		Partial: Eastern Soviet Union, Alaska, Canada, United States, Northern Mexico		^{[a]}
February 15, 1961	8:19:48	120	Total	0.883	1.036	2:45	47.4°N 40.0°E	258	160	Total: France, Monaco, Italy, San Marino, SFR Yugoslavia, Albania, Bulgaria, Romania and the Soviet Union Partial: Europe, North Africa, Northeast Africa, West Asia, Central Asia, South Asia		^{[a]}
August 11, 1961	10:46:47	125	Annular	−0.8859	0.9375	6:35	45.8°S 4.0°E	499	310	Annular: Antarctica Partial: Eastern South America, Southern Africa, Antarctica		^{[a]}
February 5, 1962	0:12:38	130	Total	0.2107	1.043	4:08	4.2°S 178.1°E	147	91	Total: Indonesia, Netherlands New Guinea, the Territory of Papua New Guinea and the British Solomon Islands Partial: East Asia, Australia, Oceania, Hawaii, Western North America		^{[a]}
July 31, 1962	12:25:33	135	Annular	−0.113	0.9716	3:33	12.0°N 5.7°W	103	64	Annular: Venezuela, Roraima, Guyana, Dutch Guiana, Senegal, Gambia Colony and Protectorate, Mali, Upper Volta, Ghana, Togo, Dahomey, Nigeria, Cameroon, Congo-Brazzaville, Congo-Léopoldville, Tanganyika, Portuguese Mozambique, French Comoros, Mayotte and the Malagasy Republic Partial: Caribbean, Northern South America, Africa, Southern Europe, Middle East		^{[a]}
January 25, 1963	13:37:12	140	Annular	−0.4898	0.9951	0:25	48.2°S 15.0°W	20	12	Annular: Chile, Argentina, South Africa, Basutoland and Malagasy Republic Partial: Southern and Central South America, Antarctica, Southern Africa, Eastern Africa		^{[a]}
July 20, 1963	20:36:13	145	Total	0.6571	1.0224	1:40	61.7°N 119.6°W	101	63	Total: Hokkaido, Kuril Islands, Alaska, Maine and Canada Partial: Eastern Soviet Union, North America, Central America, Caribbean, Far Northern Europe, Northern South America		^{[a]}
January 14, 1964	20:30:08	150	Partial	−1.2354	0.5591	—	68.2°S 43.1°E	—		Partial: Antarctica, Extreme Southern South America		^{[a]}
June 10, 1964	4:34:07	117	Partial	−1.1393	0.7545	—	65.0°S 135.9°E	—		Partial: Australia, Western Oceania		^{[a]}
July 9, 1964	11:17:53	155	Partial	1.3623	0.3221	—	67.6°N 172.9°W	—		Partial: Canada, Greenland, Eastern Soviet Union		^{[a]}
December 4, 1964	1:31:54	122	Partial	1.1193	0.7518	—	64.3°N 173.3°W	—		Partial: Northeast Asia, Southwest Alaska, Hawaii		^{[a]}
May 30, 1965	21:17:31	127	Total	−0.4225	1.0544	5:15	2.5°S 133.8°W	198	123	Total: Northland Region, Manuae, Manuae, Motu One and Peru Partial: Oceania, Mexico, Central America, Caribbean, Western South America		^{[a]}
November 23, 1965	4:14:51	132	Annular	0.3906	0.9656	4:02	1.7°N 119.8°E	134	83	Annular: Soviet Union, Afghanistan, Pakistan, India, China, Nepal, Sikkim, Burma, Sainyabuli Province, Cambodia, South Vietnam, Spratly Islands, Brunei, Malaysia, Indonesia, the Territory of Papua New Guinea and Gilbert and Ellice Islands Partial: Asia, Australia, Oceania		^{[a]}
May 20, 1966	9:39:02	137	Annular	0.3467	0.9991	0:05	39.2°N 26.4°E	3	1.9	Annular: Guinea, Mali, Algeria, Libya, Greece, Turkey, the Soviet Union and China Partial: North Africa, Central Africa, Northeast Africa, Europe, West Asia, Central Asia, North Asia, South Asia		^{[a]}
November 12, 1966	14:23:28	142	Total	−0.33	1.0234	1:57	35.6°S 48.2°W	84	52	Total: Peru, Chile, Bolivia, Argentina and Brazil Partial: Central America, Caribbean, South America, Antarctica, Southern Africa		^{[a]}
May 9, 1967	14:42:48	147	Partial	1.1422	0.7201	—	62.5°N 168.1°W	—		Partial: North America, Northern Europe		^{[a]}
November 2, 1967	5:38:56	152	Total (non-central)	1.0007	1.0126	—	62.0°S 27.8°W	—		Total: None Partial: Southern Africa, Antarctica		^{[a]}
March 28, 1968	23:00:30	119	Partial	−1.037	0.899	—	61.0°S 79.8°W	—		Partial: Eastern Oceania, Antarctica		^{[a]}
September 22, 1968	11:18:46	124	Total	0.9451	1.0099	0:40	56.2°N 64.0°E	104	65	Total: Soviet Union and the Xinjiang Partial: Europe, Northeast Africa, West Asia, Central Asia, South Asia		^{[a]}
March 18, 1969	4:54:57	129	Annular	−0.2704	0.9954	0:26	14.8°S 116.3°E	16	9.9	Annular: Indonesia, Faraulep and Gaferut Partial: Madagascar, Antarctica, Australia, Southeast Asia, East Asia, Northern Oceania		^{[a]}
September 11, 1969	19:58:59	134	Annular	0.2201	0.969	3:11	15.6°N 114.1°W	114	71	Annular: Peru, Bolivia and Mato Grosso Partial: North America, Central America, Caribbean, Western South America		^{[a]}
March 7, 1970	17:38:30	139	Total	0.4473	1.0414	3:28	18.2°N 94.7°W	153	95	Total: Mexico, Florida, Georgia, South Carolina, North Carolina, Virginia, Maryland, Nantucket, the Canadian Maritimes and northern Miquelon-Langlade Partial: Hawaii, North America, Central America, Caribbean, Northern South America		^{[a]}
August 31, 1970	21:55:30	144	Annular	−0.5364	0.94	6:47	20.3°S 164.0°W	258	160	Annular: Territory of Papua and New Guinea, Gilbert and Ellice Islands, West Samoa and American Samoa Partial: Eastern Australia, Oceania, Antarctica		^{[a]}
February 25, 1971	9:38:07	149	Partial	1.1188	0.7872	—	61.4°N 33.5°W	—		Partial: North Africa, Europe		^{[a]}
July 22, 1971	9:31:55	116	Partial	1.513	0.0689	—	63.5°N 177.0°E	—		Partial: Eastern Soviet Union, Northern Alaska		^{[a]}
August 20, 1971	22:39:31	154	Partial	−1.2659	0.508	—	61.7°S 135.4°E	—		Partial: Australia, Oceania, Antarctica		^{[a]}
January 16, 1972	11:03:22	121	Annular	−0.9365	0.9692	1:53	74.9°S 107.7°E	321	199	Annular: Antarctica Partial: Antarctica, Extreme Southern South America		^{[a]}
July 10, 1972	19:46:38	126	Total	0.6872	1.0379	2:36	63.5°N 94.2°W	175	109	Total: Soviet Union, Alaska, Northern Canada, Quebec and the Canadian Maritimes Partial: Northern Soviet Union, North America, Caribbean, Northern South America, Northern Europe		^{[a]}
January 4, 1973	15:46:21	131	Annular	−0.2644	0.9303	7:49	37.9°S 51.2°W	271	168	Annular: Chile and Argentina Partial: Southern and Central South America, Antarctica, West Africa, Southern Africa		^{[a]}
June 30, 1973	11:38:41	136	Total	−0.0785	1.0792	7:04	18.8°N 5.6°E	256	159	Total: Guyana, Dutch Guiana, Santo Antão, Mauritania, Mali, Algeria, Niger, Chad, Sudan, Uganda, Kenya, Somalia, and the British Seychelles Partial: Eastern South America, Africa, Southern Europe, Middle East		^{[a]}
December 24, 1973	15:02:44	141	Annular	0.4171	0.9174	12:02	1.1°N 48.5°W	345	214	Annular: Mexico, Nicaragua, Costa Rica, Panama, Colombia, Venezuela, Brazil, Guyana, Dutch Guiana, French Guiana, Portuguese Cape Verde, Mauritania, Spanish Sahara, Mali and Algeria Partial: Eastern North America, Central America, Caribbean, Northern and Central South America, Western Europe, West Africa		^{[a]}
June 20, 1974	4:48:04	146	Total	−0.8239	1.0592	5:09	32.1°S 103.7°E	344	214	Total: Île Amsterdam and Western Australia Partial: Madagascar, Indonesia, Australia, South Island, New Zealand		^{[a]}
December 13, 1974	16:13:13	151	Partial	1.0797	0.8266	—	66.8°N 69.4°W	—		Partial: North America, Caribbean, Extreme Northern South America, Iberian Peninsula		^{[a]}
May 11, 1975	7:17:33	118	Partial	1.0647	0.8636	—	69.7°N 80.2°W	—		Partial: North Africa, Europe, North Asia, Greenland, Northern Canada		^{[a]}
November 3, 1975	13:15:54	123	Partial	−1.0248	0.9588	—	70.4°S 161.7°W	—		Partial: Southern South America, Antarctica		^{[a]}
April 29, 1976	10:24:18	128	Annular	0.3378	0.9421	6:41	34.0°N 18.3°E	227	141	Annular: North Africa, Greece, Turkey, Middle East, central Asia, India and China Partial: Canadian Maritimes, North Africa, Central Africa, Europe, Middle East, Central Asia, South Asia		^{[a]}
October 23, 1976	5:13:45	133	Total	−0.327	1.0572	4:46	30.0°S 92.3°E	199	124	Total: Tanzania, Seychelles and Australia Partial: East Africa, Indonesia, Australia, Antarctica, Western Oceania		^{[a]}
April 18, 1977	10:31:30	138	Annular	−0.399	0.9449	7:04	11.9°S 28.3°E	220	140	Annular: South West Africa, Angola, Zambia, southeastern Zaire, Malawi, Tanzania, and the Seychelles Partial: Eastern Brazil, Southern Africa, Central Africa, East Africa, Antarctica, Middle East, South Asia		^{[a]}
October 12, 1977	20:27:27	143	Total	0.3836	1.0269	2:37	14.1°N 123.6°W	99	62	Total: Colombia and Venezuela Partial: North America, Central America, Caribbean, Northern South America		^{[a]}
April 7, 1978	15:03:47	148	Partial	−1.1081	0.7883	—	71.9°S 23.3°E	—		Partial: Antarctica, Southern South America, Southern Africa		^{[a]}
October 2, 1978	6:28:43	153	Partial	1.1616	0.6905	—	72.0°N 159.6°E	—		Partial: North Asia, East Asia		^{[a]}
February 26, 1979	16:55:06	120	Total	0.8981	1.0391	2:49	52.1°N 94.5°W	298	185	Total: Washington, Oregon, Idaho, Montana, North Dakota, Saskatchewan, Manitoba, Ontario, Quebec, the Northwest Territories and Greenland Partial: North America, Central America, Caribbean, Western Europe		^{[a]}
August 22, 1979	17:22:38	125	Annular	−0.9632	0.9329	6:03	59.6°S 108.5°W	953	592	Annular: Antarctica Partial: Southern South America, Antarctica		^{[a]}
February 16, 1980	8:54:01	130	Total	0.2224	1.0434	4:08	0.1°S 47.1°E	149	93	Total: Angola, Zaire, Tanzania, Kenya, India, Bangladesh, Burma, China Partial: Africa, West Asia, Central Asia, South Asia, Southeast Asia		^{[a]}
August 10, 1980	19:12:21	135	Annular	−0.1915	0.9727	3:23	4.6°N 108.9°W	100	62	Annular: Tabuaeran, Peru, Bolivia, Paraguay and Brazil Partial: Eastern Oceania, Hawaii, Southern United States, Mexico, Central America, Caribbean, South America		^{[a]}
February 4, 1981	22:09:24	140	Annular	−0.4838	0.9937	0:33	44.4°S 140.8°W	25	16	Annular: Tasmania and Stewart Island Partial: Eastern Australia, Oceania, Antarctica, Western South America		^{[a]}
July 31, 1981	3:46:37	145	Total	0.5792	1.0258	2:02	53.3°N 134.1°E	108	67	Total: Soviet Union Partial: Northern Europe, Asia, Alaska, Western Canada, Greenland		^{[a]}
January 25, 1982	4:42:53	150	Partial	−1.2311	0.5663	—	69.3°S 91.7°W	—		Partial: Antarctica, New Zealand		^{[a]}
June 21, 1982	12:04:33	117	Partial	−1.2102	0.6168	—	65.9°S 13.2°E	—		Partial: Southern Africa		^{[a]}
July 20, 1982	18:44:44	155	Partial	1.2886	0.4643	—	68.6°N 64.2°E	—		Partial: Northern Soviet Union, Northern Alaska, Northern Canada, Greenland, Northern Europe		^{[a]}
December 15, 1982	9:32:09	122	Partial	1.1293	0.735	—	65.3°N 56.9°E	—		Partial: Northeast Africa, Europe, Middle East, South Asia, Central Asia		^{[a]}
June 11, 1983	4:43:33	127	Total	−0.4947	1.0524	5:11	6.2°S 114.2°E	199	124	Total: Christmas Islands, Indonesia, Papua New Guinea and Vanuatu Partial: Madagascar, Southeast Asia, Australia, Western Oceania		^{[a]}
December 4, 1983	12:31:15	132	Annular	0.4015	0.9666	4:01	0.9°N 4.7°W	131	81	Annular: Cape Verde, Annobón Island, Gabon, the People's Republic of Congo, Zaire, Uganda, Sudan, Kenya, Ethiopia and Somalia Partial: Northern South America, Southern Europe, Africa, Middle East		^{[a]}
May 30, 1984	16:45:41	137	Annular	0.2755	0.998	0:11	37.5°N 76.7°W	7	4.3	Annular: Mexico, Louisiana, Mississippi, Alabama, Georgia, South Carolina, North Carolina, Virginia, Azores, Morocco and Algeria Partial: Hawaii, North America, Central America, Caribbean, Northern South America, Western Europe, Northwest Africa		^{[a]}
November 22, 1984	22:54:17	142	Total	−0.3132	1.0237	2:00	37.8°S 173.6°W	85	53	Total: Indonesia and Papua New Guinea Partial: Indonesia, Australia, Oceania, Antarctica, Extreme Southern South America		^{[a]}
May 19, 1985	21:29:38	147	Partial	1.072	0.8406	—	63.2°N 81.1°E	—		Partial: Northeast Asia, Alaska, Canada, Greenland		^{[a]}
November 12, 1985	14:11:27	152	Total	−0.9795	1.0388	—	68.6°S 142.6°W	—		Total: Antarctica Partial: Southern South America, Antarctica		^{[a]}
April 9, 1986	6:21:22	119	Partial	−1.0822	0.8236	—	61.2°S 161.4°E	—		Partial: Antarctica, Australia, Indonesia, New Zealand		^{[a]}
October 3, 1986	19:06:15	124	Hybrid	0.9931	1.00002	0:00	59.9°N 37.1°W	1	0.62	Total: None Partial: North America, Central America, Caribbean, Northern South America, Iceland		^{[a]}
March 29, 1987	12:49:47	129	Hybrid	−0.3053	1.0013	0:08	12.3°S 2.3°W	5	3.1	Annular: Argentina, Gabon, Equatorial Guinea, Cameroon, Central African Republic, Sudan, Ethiopia, Djibouti and Somaliland Partial: Southern and Central South America, Antarctica, Africa, Middle East		^{[a]}
September 23, 1987	3:12:22	134	Annular	0.2787	0.9634	3:49	14.3°N 138.4°E	137	85	Annular: Soviet Union, China, Mongolia, Okinawa Islands, the Federal States of Micronesia, Papua New Guinea, Solomon Islands, Rotuma Islands of Fiji, Wallis Islands and West Samoa Partial: South Asia, Southeast Asia, East Asia, Australia, Oceania, Hawaii		^{[a]}
March 18, 1988	1:58:56	139	Total	0.4188	1.0464	3:46	20.7°N 140.0°E	169	105	Total: Indonesia and the Philippines Partial: South Asia, Southeast Asia, East Asia, Northeast Asia, Australia, Alaska		^{[a]}
September 11, 1988	4:44:29	144	Annular	−0.4681	0.9377	6:57	20.0°S 94.4°E	258	160	Annular: Somalia and Macquarie Island Partial: East Africa, Middle East, South Asia, Southeast Asia, Australia, New Zealand		^{[a]}
March 7, 1989	18:08:41	149	Partial	1.0981	0.8268	—	61.2°N 169.8°W	—		Partial: Hawaii, Alaska, Canada, Western and Central United States, Northwest Mexico, Greenland		^{[a]}
August 31, 1989	5:31:47	154	Partial	−1.1928	0.6344	—	61.3°S 23.6°E	—		Partial: Southern Africa, Antarctica		^{[a]}
January 26, 1990	19:31:24	121	Annular	−0.9457	0.967	2:03	71.0°S 22.2°W	373	232	Annular: Antarctica Partial: Antarctica, Southern and Eastern South America, New Zealand		^{[a]}
July 22, 1990	3:03:07	126	Total	0.7597	1.0391	2:33	65.2°N 168.9°E	201	125	Total: Finland, Soviet Union, Andreanof Islands and Amukta Partial: Eastern Europe, North Asia, Alaska, Western Canada, Western United States, Hawaii		^{[a]}
January 15, 1991	23:53:51	131	Annular	−0.2727	0.929	7:53	36.4°S 170.4°W	277	172	Annular: Western Australia, Tasmania, New Zealand and French Polynesia Partial: Indonesia, Australia, Oceania, Antarctica		^{[a]}
July 11, 1991	19:07:01	136	Total	−0.0041	1.08	6:53	22.0°N 105.2°W	258	160	Total: Hawaii, Mexico, Guatemala, El Salvador, Honduras, Nicaragua, Costa Rica, Panama, Colombia and Brazil Partial: Southern Canada, United States, Mexico, Central America, Caribbean, South America		^{[a]}
January 4, 1992	23:05:37	141	Annular	0.4091	0.9179	11:41	1.0°N 169.7°W	340	210	Annular: Federal States of Micronesia, Nauru, Kiribati, Baker Island, Palmyra Atoll, Kingman Reef and California Partial: Northeast Asia, Northern Australia, Oceania, Hawaii, Western North America		^{[a]}
June 30, 1992	12:11:22	146	Total	−0.7512	1.0592	5:21	25.2°S 9.5°W	294	183	Total: Uruguay and Rio Grande do Sul, Brazil Partial: Central South America, West Africa, Central Africa, Southern Africa		^{[a]}
December 24, 1992	0:31:41	151	Partial	1.0711	0.8422	—	65.7°N 155.7°E	—		Partial: East Asia, Northeast Asia, Alaska		^{[a]}
May 21, 1993	14:20:15	118	Partial	1.1372	0.7352	—	68.8°N 162.3°E	—		Partial: Alaska, Canada, Greenland, United States, Northern Europe		^{[a]}
November 13, 1993	21:45:51	123	Partial	−1.0411	0.928	—	69.6°S 58.3°E	—		Partial: Australia, New Zealand, Antarctica, Southern South America		^{[a]}
May 10, 1994	17:12:27	128	Annular	0.4077	0.9431	6:13	41.5°N 84.1°W	230	140	Annular: Mexico, Arizona, New Mexico, Texas, Oklahoma, Kansas, Missouri, Illinois, Wisconsin, Indiana, Michigan, Ohio, Pennsylvania, New York, Massachusetts, Vermont, New Hampshire, Maine, Ontario, Nova Scotia, Quebec, Azores and Morocco Partial: Eastern Russia, North America, Central America, Caribbean, Western Europe, West Africa		^{[a]}
November 3, 1994	13:40:06	133	Total	−0.3522	1.0535	4:23	35.4°S 34.2°W	189	117	Total: Peru, Chile, Bolivia, Argentina, Paraguay, Brazil and Gough Island Partial: Central America, South America, Antarctica, Southern Africa		^{[a]}
April 29, 1995	17:33:20	138	Annular	−0.3382	0.9497	6:37	4.8°S 79.4°W	196	122	Annular: Peru, Ecuador, Colombia and Brazil Partial: South America, Mexico, Central America, Florida, Caribbean, West Africa		^{[a]}
October 24, 1995	4:33:30	143	Total	0.3518	1.0213	2:10	8.4°N 113.2°E	78	48	Total: Iran, Afghanistan, Pakistan, India, Bangladesh, Burma, Thailand, Cambodia, Vietnam, Spratly Islands, Sabah, Philippines and Indonesia Partial: Northeast Africa, Asia, Australia, Northern Oceania		^{[a]}
April 17, 1996	22:38:12	148	Partial	−1.058	0.8799	—	71.3°S 104.0°W	—		Partial: Antarctica, New Zealand, Eastern Oceania		^{[a]}
October 12, 1996	14:03:04	153	Partial	1.1227	0.7575	—	71.7°N 32.1°E	—		Partial: Eastern Canada, Greenland, Europe, North Africa, Middle East		^{[a]}
March 9, 1997	1:24:51	120	Total	0.9183	1.042	2:50	57.8°N 130.7°E	356	221	Total: Kazakhstan, Russia, Mongolia, Xinjiang and Northeastern China Partial: Southeast Asia, East Asia, Alaska, Western Canada		^{[a]}
September 2, 1997	0:04:48	125	Partial	−1.0352	0.8988	−	71.8°S 114.3°E	—		Partial: Australia, Oceania, Antarctica		^{[a]}
February 26, 1998	17:29:27	130	Total	0.2391	1.0441	4:09	4.7°N 82.7°W	151	94	Total: Galápagos Islands, Panama, Colombia, the Paraguaná Peninsula, Aruba, Curaçao, Bonaire, Montserrat, Guadeloupe and Antigua and Barbuda Partial: Mexico, Southern and Eastern United States, Central America, Caribbean, Northern South America, West Africa, Iberian Peninsula		^{[a]}
August 22, 1998	2:07:11	135	Annular	−0.2644	0.9734	3:14	3.0°S 145.4°E	99	62	Annular: Indonesia, Malaysia, Papua New Guinea, Solomon Islands and Vanuatu Partial: Southeast Asia, East Asia, Australia, Oceania		^{[a]}
February 16, 1999	6:34:38	140	Annular	−0.4726	0.9928	0:40	39.8°S 93.9°E	29	18	Annular: Prince Edward Islands and Australia Partial: Southern Africa, Antarctica, Australia, Indonesia, the Philippines, Western Oceania		^{[a]}
August 11, 1999	11:04:09	145	Total	0.5062	1.0286	2:23	45.1°N 24.3°E	112	70	Total: United Kingdom, France, Belgium, Luxembourg, Germany, Austria, Slovenia, Croatia, Hungary, FR Yugoslavia, Romania, Bulgaria, Turkey, Syria, Iraq, Iran, Pakistan and India Partial: Eastern Canada, Greenland, Europe, North Africa, Middle East, Central Asia, South Asia, China		^{[a]}
February 5, 2000	12:50:27	150	Partial	−1.2233	0.5795	—	70.2°S 134.1°E	—		Partial: Antarctica		^{[a]}
July 1, 2000	19:33:34	117	Partial	−1.2821	0.4768	—	66.9°S 109.5°W	—		Partial: Extreme Southern South America		^{[a]}
July 31, 2000	2:14:08	155	Partial	1.2166	0.6034	—	69.5°N 59.9°W	—		Partial: Northern Russia, Northeastern Scandinavia, Alaska, Western Canada, Greenland, Western United States		^{[a]}
December 25, 2000	17:35:57	122	Partial	1.1367	0.7228	—	66.3°N 74.1°W	—		Partial: North America, Caribbean		^{[a]}

== See also ==
- List of solar eclipses in the 18th century
- List of solar eclipses in the 19th century
- List of solar eclipses in the 21st century
