= Solar Saros 111 =

Saros cycle series 111 for solar eclipses

Historic saros cycle animation

Saros cycle series 111 for solar eclipses occurred at the Moon's ascending node, repeating every 18 years and 11 days, containing 79 eclipses, 42 of which were umbral (11 annular, 14 hybrid, 17 total). The first eclipse was on 30 August 528 and the last was on 5 Jan 1935. The longest totality was 6 minutes 11 seconds on 9 June 1592 and the longest annular eclipse was 3 minutes 4 seconds on 15 April 907.

This solar saros is linked to Lunar Saros 104.

== Umbral eclipses ==
Umbral eclipses (annular, total and hybrid) can be further classified as either: 1) Central (two limits), 2) Central (one limit) or 3) Non-Central (one limit). The statistical distribution of these classes in Saros series 111 appears in the following table.

Classification	Number	Percent
All Umbral eclipses	42	100.00%
Central (two limits)	42	100.00%
Central (one limit)	0	0.00%
Non-central (one limit)	0	0.00%

== All eclipses ==
Note: Dates are given in the Julian calendar prior to 15 October 1582, and in the Gregorian calendar after that.

Saros	Member	Date	Time (Greatest) UTC	Type	Location Lat, Long	Gamma	Mag.	Width (km)	Duration (min:sec)	Ref
111	1	August 30, 528	20:01:34	Partial	71.4N 17.5E	1.5569	0.0164			
111	2	September 11, 546	3:08:22	Partial	71.8N 103.8W	1.5085	0.0994			
111	3	September 21, 564	10:24:56	Partial	72N 132.2E	1.4676	0.1693			
111	4	October 2, 582	17:50:20	Partial	71.8N 6E	1.4333	0.2276			
111	5	October 13, 600	1:25:21	Partial	71.5N 122.5W	1.4062	0.2734			
111	6	October 24, 618	9:08:27	Partial	70.8N 107.5E	1.3853	0.3086			
111	7	November 3, 636	16:57:50	Partial	70N 23.5W	1.369	0.336			
111	8	November 15, 654	0:54:10	Partial	69.1N 155.6W	1.3578	0.3547			
111	9	November 25, 672	8:54:26	Partial	68N 72E	1.349	0.3694			
111	10	December 6, 690	16:57:53	Partial	66.9N 60.6W	1.3426	0.3801			
111	11	December 17, 708	1:00:57	Partial	65.8N 167.5E	1.3352	0.3923			
111	12	December 28, 726	9:04:22	Partial	64.8N 35.9E	1.3278	0.4046			
111	13	January 7, 745	17:04:29	Partial	63.8N 94.4W	1.3168	0.4226			
111	14	January 19, 763	1:00:28	Partial	63N 136.6E	1.3022	0.447			
111	15	January 29, 781	8:50:22	Partial	62.2N 9.5E	1.282	0.4807			
111	16	February 9, 799	16:34:07	Partial	61.6N 116W	1.2562	0.5241			
111	17	February 20, 817	0:10:20	Partial	61.2N 120.6E	1.2237	0.5794			
111	18	March 3, 835	7:38:42	Partial	60.9N 0.7W	1.1839	0.6476			
111	19	March 13, 853	14:59:08	Partial	60.8N 120W	1.1368	0.729			
111	20	March 24, 871	22:12:34	Partial	60.8N 122.4E	1.0832	0.8227			
111	21	April 4, 889	5:17:45	Partial	61N 6.9E	1.0218	0.9306			
111	22	April 15, 907	12:17:35	Annular	63.9N 70.9W	0.9549	0.955	557	3m 4s	
111	23	April 25, 925	19:11:24	Annular	64.2N 156.5W	0.8822	0.9628	285	2m 40s	
111	24	May 7, 943	2:02:38	Annular	64N 114.2E	0.8059	0.9693	185	2m 17s	
111	25	May 17, 961	8:48:53	Annular	62.8N 25.1E	0.7245	0.9753	128	1m 54s	
111	26	May 28, 979	15:35:35	Annular	60.5N 65.9W	0.6424	0.9806	90	1m 34s	
111	27	June 7, 997	22:20:33	Annular	56.8N 158.6W	0.558	0.9853	63	1m 15s	
111	28	June 19, 1015	5:08:27	Annular	52N 105.3E	0.4748	0.9894	43	0m 57s	
111	29	June 29, 1033	11:57:10	Annular	46.2N 6.8E	0.3912	0.9928	27	0m 40s	
111	30	July 10, 1051	18:52:23	Annular	39.9N 95.1W	0.312	0.9957	16	0m 26s	
111	31	July 21, 1069	1:51:43	Annular	33.2N 160.5E	0.2355	0.9979	8	0m 13s	
111	32	August 1, 1087	8:58:39	Annular	26.2N 53.1E	0.1644	0.9996	1	0m 2s	
111	33	August 11, 1105	16:12:35	Hybrid	19N 56.6W	0.0982	1.0008	3	0m 5s	
111	34	August 22, 1123	23:36:13	Hybrid	11.9N 169.3W	0.0391	1.0016	6	0m 10s	
111	35	September 2, 1141	7:08:35	Hybrid	4.9N 75.7E	-0.0136	1.0021	7	0m 13s	
111	36	September 13, 1159	14:50:28	Hybrid	1.9S 41.8W	-0.0591	1.0023	8	0m 15s	
111	37	September 23, 1177	22:42:22	Hybrid	8.3S 161.5W	-0.0971	1.0025	9	0m 16s	
111	38	October 5, 1195	6:44:13	Hybrid	14.3S 76.6E	-0.1277	1.0026	9	0m 16s	
111	39	October 15, 1213	14:54:53	Hybrid	19.8S 47W	-0.1519	1.0029	10	0m 18s	
111	40	October 26, 1231	23:14:27	Hybrid	24.6S 172.2W	-0.1694	1.0033	12	0m 20s	
111	41	November 6, 1249	7:41:11	Hybrid	28.7S 61.6E	-0.1817	1.0041	14	0m 24s	
111	42	November 17, 1267	16:14:34	Hybrid	31.8S 65.6W	-0.1891	1.0052	18	0m 30s	
111	43	November 28, 1285	0:51:28	Hybrid	33.9S 167E	-0.1943	1.0068	24	0m 39s	
111	44	December 9, 1303	9:32:53	Hybrid	34.9S 39E	-0.1964	1.0089	31	0m 50s	
111	45	December 19, 1321	18:15:02	Hybrid	34.9S 89.2W	-0.1987	1.0115	40	1m 4s	
111	46	December 31, 1339	2:57:36	Hybrid	33.9S 142.5E	-0.2011	1.0147	52	1m 20s	
111	47	January 10, 1358	11:37:17	Total	32S 14.4E	-0.2065	1.0183	64	1m 38s	
111	48	January 21, 1376	20:15:01	Total	29.5S 113.5W	-0.2141	1.0225	78	1m 58s	
111	49	February 1, 1394	4:47:49	Total	26.6S 119.2E	-0.2268	1.027	94	2m 19s	
111	50	February 12, 1412	13:15:02	Total	23.5S 7W	-0.2446	1.0319	111	2m 42s	
111	51	February 22, 1430	21:35:50	Total	20.5S 131.9W	-0.2685	1.0369	128	3m 5s	
111	52	March 5, 1448	5:49:57	Total	17.7S 104.7E	-0.2984	1.0421	147	3m 30s	
111	53	March 16, 1466	13:57:13	Total	15.3S 17.1W	-0.3348	1.0471	165	3m 56s	
111	54	March 26, 1484	21:56:47	Total	13.5S 137W	-0.3782	1.0521	185	4m 22s	
111	55	April 7, 1502	5:49:59	Total	12.6S 104.7E	-0.4276	1.0567	205	4m 49s	
111	56	April 17, 1520	13:36:46	Total	12.6S 12.2W	-0.4825	1.0609	226	5m 15s	
111	57	April 28, 1538	21:17:31	Total	13.7S 127.7W	-0.5432	1.0645	249	5m 38s	
111	58	May 9, 1556	4:53:36	Total	16S 117.8E	-0.6079	1.0673	274	5m 58s	
111	59	May 20, 1574	12:25:42	Total	19.7S 3.7E	-0.6763	1.0694	305	6m 9s	
111	60	June 9, 1592	19:55:49	Total	24.7S 110.3W	-0.7465	1.0705	344	6m 11s	
111	61	June 21, 1610	3:23:00	Total	31.5S 135.5E	-0.8193	1.0705	400	5m 59s	
111	62	July 1, 1628	10:50:39	Total	40.3S 20E	-0.8917	1.0692	501	5m 32s	
111	63	July 12, 1646	18:18:19	Total	53.2S 98W	-0.9641	1.0658	834	4m 44s	
111	64	July 23, 1664	1:48:46	Partial	68.8S 134.7E	-1.0343	0.9581			
111	65	August 3, 1682	9:21:11	Partial	69.7S 9.5E	-1.1028	0.8246			
111	66	August 14, 1700	16:59:06	Partial	70.6S 117.5W	-1.1668	0.7			
111	67	August 26, 1718	0:41:45	Partial	71.2S 113.7E	-1.2267	0.5837			
111	68	September 5, 1736	8:30:26	Partial	71.7S 17.1W	-1.2817	0.4775			
111	69	September 16, 1754	16:25:41	Partial	71.9S 149.9W	-1.3314	0.3821			
111	70	September 27, 1772	0:28:19	Partial	72S 75.4E	-1.3751	0.2988			
111	71	October 8, 1790	8:38:52	Partial	71.7S 61.3W	-1.4122	0.2287			
111	72	October 19, 1808	16:55:30	Partial	71.3S 160.8E	-1.4443	0.1687			
111	73	October 31, 1826	1:20:39	Partial	70.6S 21.2E	-1.4696	0.1222			
111	74	November 10, 1844	9:51:45	Partial	69.8S 119.3W	-1.4902	0.0847			
111	75	November 21, 1862	18:29:48	Partial	68.8S 99.1E	-1.5052	0.058			
111	76	December 2, 1880	3:11:33	Partial	67.8S 42.9W	-1.5172	0.0369			
111	77	December 13, 1898	11:58:13	Partial	66.8S 174.5E	-1.5253	0.0231			
111	78	December 24, 1916	20:46:22	Partial	65.7S 32.1E	-1.5321	0.0114			
111	79	January 5, 1935	5:35:46	Partial	64.7S 110.2W	-1.5381	0.0013			
