= Solar Saros 114 =

Saros cycle series 114 for solar eclipses

Historic saros cycle animation

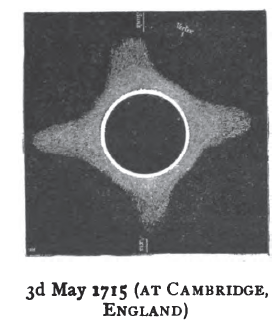
May 3, 1715 Saros member 60

Saros cycle series 114 for solar eclipses occurred at the Moon's descending node, repeating every 18 years, 11 days, containing 72 eclipses, 46 of which were umbral (13 annular, 16 hybrid, and 17 total). The first eclipse was on 23 July 651 and the last was on 12 September 1931. The longest totality was 4 minutes 18 seconds on 21 April 1697, the longest annular was 4 minutes 33 seconds on 13 February 994.

This solar saros is linked to Lunar Saros 107.

== Umbral eclipses ==
Umbral eclipses (annular, total and hybrid) can be further classified as either: 1) Central (two limits), 2) Central (one limit) or 3) Non-Central (one limit). The statistical distribution of these classes in Saros series 114 appears in the following table.

Classification	Number	Percent
All Umbral eclipses	46	100.00%
Central (two limits)	44	95.65%
Central (one limit)	1	2.17%
Non-central (one limit)	1	2.17%

== All eclipses ==
Note: Dates are given in the Julian calendar prior to 15 October 1582, and in the Gregorian calendar after that.

Saros	Member	Date	Time (Greatest) UTC	Type	Location Lat, Long	Gamma	Mag.	Width (km)	Duration (min:sec)	Ref
114	1	July 23, 651	9:28:50	Partial	63.1S 11.9E	-1.5588	0.0086			
114	2	August 2, 669	16:06:06	Partial	62.4S 97.3W	-1.4861	0.1336			
114	3	August 13, 687	22:50:13	Partial	61.7S 152E	-1.418	0.25			
114	4	August 24, 705	5:41:35	Partial	61.3S 39.7E	-1.3552	0.357			
114	5	September 4, 723	12:42:29	Partial	60.9S 74.9W	-1.2996	0.4512			
114	6	September 14, 741	19:52:17	Partial	60.8S 168.3E	-1.2506	0.5335			
114	7	September 26, 759	3:11:57	Partial	60.8S 49.1E	-1.2093	0.6027			
114	8	October 6, 777	10:39:54	Partial	60.9S 72.1W	-1.1742	0.6611			
114	9	October 17, 795	18:17:55	Partial	61.3S 164.1E	-1.1468	0.7065			
114	10	October 28, 813	2:03:14	Partial	61.8S 38.4E	-1.1249	0.7426			
114	11	November 8, 831	9:55:47	Partial	62.4S 89.2W	-1.1085	0.7696			
114	12	November 18, 849	17:53:57	Partial	63.2S 141.5E	-1.0962	0.7898			
114	13	November 30, 867	1:57:13	Partial	64.1S 10.7E	-1.088	0.8035			
114	14	December 10, 885	10:02:13	Partial	65.2S 120.9W	-1.0804	0.8164			
114	15	December 21, 903	18:08:11	Partial	66.2S 106.9E	-1.073	0.8293			
114	16	January 1, 922	2:12:56	Partial	67.3S 25.5W	-1.0642	0.8447			
114	17	January 12, 940	10:16:11	Partial	68.4S 158W	-1.0538	0.8631			
114	18	January 22, 958	18:13:32	Partial	69.5S 70.3E	-1.038	0.8911			
114	19	February 3, 976	2:06:44	Annular	70.4S 61W	1.0182	0.9262	-	-	
114	20	February 13, 994	9:51:58	Annular	74.3S 151.1E	-0.9912	0.9303	-	4m 33s	
114	21	February 24, 1012	17:31:58	Annular	71.7S 11.9W	-0.9593	0.9376	845	4m 32s	
114	22	March 7, 1030	1:01:54	Annular	64.1S 147.6W	-0.9185	0.9445	519	4m 25s	
114	23	March 17, 1048	8:26:35	Annular	55.6S 88.7E	-0.8726	0.9514	363	4m 13s	
114	24	March 28, 1066	15:41:57	Annular	46.7S 28.8W	-0.8181	0.9582	262	3m 57s	
114	25	April 7, 1084	22:52:04	Annular	38.1S 142.9W	-0.7585	0.9649	192	3m 35s	
114	26	April 19, 1102	5:54:33	Annular	29.5S 106.2E	-0.6913	0.9714	141	3m 7s	
114	27	April 29, 1120	12:53:54	Annular	21.3S 2.9W	-0.6205	0.9777	101	2m 34s	
114	28	May 10, 1138	19:48:33	Annular	13.5S 110W	-0.5447	0.9835	70	1m 58s	
114	29	May 21, 1156	2:40:45	Annular	6.3S 144.3E	-0.4656	0.9889	44	1m 21s	
114	30	June 1, 1174	9:31:50	Annular	0.3N 39.7E	-0.3843	0.9938	24	0m 45s	
114	31	June 11, 1192	16:23:44	Annular	6N 64.3W	-0.3023	0.9981	7	0m 14s	
114	32	June 22, 1210	23:17:17	Hybrid	10.8N 168W	-0.2207	1.0018	6	0m 12s	
114	33	July 3, 1228	6:13:46	Hybrid	14.6N 88.3E	-0.1404	1.0049	17	0m 32s	
114	34	July 14, 1246	13:15:19	Hybrid	17.2N 16.2W	-0.0631	1.0074	26	0m 46s	
114	35	July 24, 1264	20:22:44	Hybrid	18.8N 121.9W	0.0104	1.0093	32	0m 56s	
114	36	August 5, 1282	3:35:56	Hybrid	19.4N 131.1E	0.0799	1.0107	37	1m 1s	
114	37	August 15, 1300	10:57:25	Hybrid	19N 22E	0.1434	1.0115	40	1m 5s	
114	38	August 26, 1318	18:27:19	Hybrid	17.9N 89.6W	0.2005	1.012	42	1m 6s	
114	39	September 6, 1336	2:06:58	Hybrid	16.2N 156.1E	0.2506	1.0122	43	1m 7s	
114	40	September 17, 1354	9:54:40	Hybrid	14.2N 39.3E	0.2947	1.0122	44	1m 7s	
114	41	September 27, 1372	17:53:15	Hybrid	11.9N 80.4W	0.3305	1.0121	44	1m 7s	
114	42	October 9, 1390	2:00:26	Hybrid	9.6N 157.3E	0.3598	1.012	44	1m 7s	
114	43	October 19, 1408	10:16:59	Hybrid	7.3N 32.6E	0.382	1.0121	45	1m 10s	
114	44	October 30, 1426	18:40:38	Hybrid	5.2N 94.1W	0.3991	1.0123	46	1m 13s	
114	45	November 10, 1444	3:12:20	Hybrid	3.5N 137.2E	0.4102	1.013	49	1m 18s	
114	46	November 21, 1462	11:49:24	Hybrid	2.2N 7.2E	0.4176	1.0139	52	1m 26s	
114	47	December 1, 1480	20:30:38	Hybrid	1.5N 123.9W	0.4218	1.0155	58	1m 37s	
114	48	December 13, 1498	5:15:08	Total	1.5N 104.3E	0.4242	1.0174	66	1m 50s	
114	49	December 23, 1516	14:00:51	Total	2.2N 27.9W	0.4256	1.0199	75	2m 5s	
114	50	January 3, 1535	22:45:49	Total	3.8N 160.1W	0.4285	1.0228	86	2m 22s	
114	51	January 14, 1553	7:28:09	Total	6.3N 68.3E	0.434	1.0263	99	2m 41s	
114	52	January 25, 1571	16:07:36	Total	9.5N 62.8W	0.4422	1.0302	113	2m 59s	
114	53	February 15, 1589	0:42:20	Total	13.6N 167.1E	0.4545	1.0344	129	3m 17s	
114	54	February 26, 1607	9:10:38	Total	18.4N 38.2E	0.4727	1.0388	147	3m 34s	
114	55	March 8, 1625	17:32:39	Total	23.9N 89.4W	0.4965	1.0434	166	3m 50s	
114	56	March 20, 1643	1:47:19	Total	30N 144.6E	0.5271	1.0479	186	4m 2s	
114	57	March 30, 1661	9:55:24	Total	36.7N 20.2E	0.5634	1.0524	209	4m 12s	
114	58	April 10, 1679	17:55:13	Total	43.8N 102.2W	0.607	1.0565	233	4m 17s	
114	59	April 21, 1697	1:49:22	Total	51.4N 136.9E	0.6559	1.0602	262	4m 18s	
114	60	May 3, 1715	9:36:30	Total	59.4N 17.9E	0.7112	1.0632	295	4m 14s	
114	61	May 13, 1733	17:18:29	Total	67.9N 99.5W	0.7712	1.0656	339	4m 6s	
114	62	May 25, 1751	0:55:16	Total	77N 144.7E	0.8359	1.067	402	3m 53s	
114	63	June 4, 1769	8:28:34	Total	87.3N 26.2E	0.9037	1.0671	521	3m 36s	
114	64	June 15, 1787	15:59:25	Total	78.7N 104.8E	0.9739	1.0648	998	3m 9s	
114	65	June 26, 1805	23:27:40	Partial	65.5N 9.9W	1.0462	0.9357			
114	66	July 8, 1823	6:56:28	Partial	64.6N 132W	1.1182	0.7958			
114	67	July 18, 1841	14:25:14	Partial	63.7N 106.2E	1.1903	0.6556			
114	68	July 29, 1859	21:56:57	Partial	63N 16W	1.2598	0.5205			
114	69	August 9, 1877	5:30:24	Partial	62.3N 138.6W	1.3277	0.3889			
114	70	August 20, 1895	13:09:16	Partial	61.8N 97.7E	1.3911	0.2665			
114	71	August 31, 1913	20:52:12	Partial	61.5N 26.8W	1.4512	0.1513			
114	72	September 12, 1931	4:41:25	Partial	61.2N 152.8W	1.506	0.0471			
