= Solar eclipse of October 12, 1996 =

20th-century partial solar eclipse

- Partial eclipse
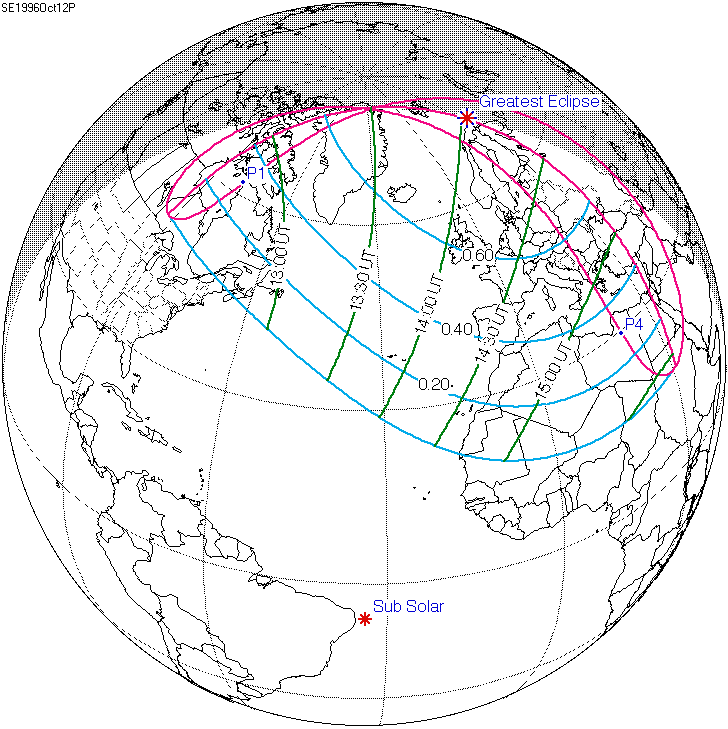
- Map
- Gamma: 1.1227
- Magnitude: 0.7575

Maximum eclipse
- Coordinates: 71.7°N 32.1°E

Times (UTC)
- Greatest eclipse: 14:03:04

References
- Saros: 153 (8 of 70)
- Catalog # (SE5000): 9500

A partial solar eclipse occurred at the Moon's ascending node of orbit on Saturday, October 12, 1996, with a magnitude of 0.7575. A solar eclipse occurs when the Moon passes between Earth and the Sun, thereby totally or partly obscuring the image of the Sun for a viewer on Earth. A partial solar eclipse occurs in the polar regions of the Earth when the center of the Moon's shadow misses the Earth.

A partial eclipse was visible for parts of eastern Canada, Greenland, Europe, North Africa, and the Middle East.

== Images ==
Animation path

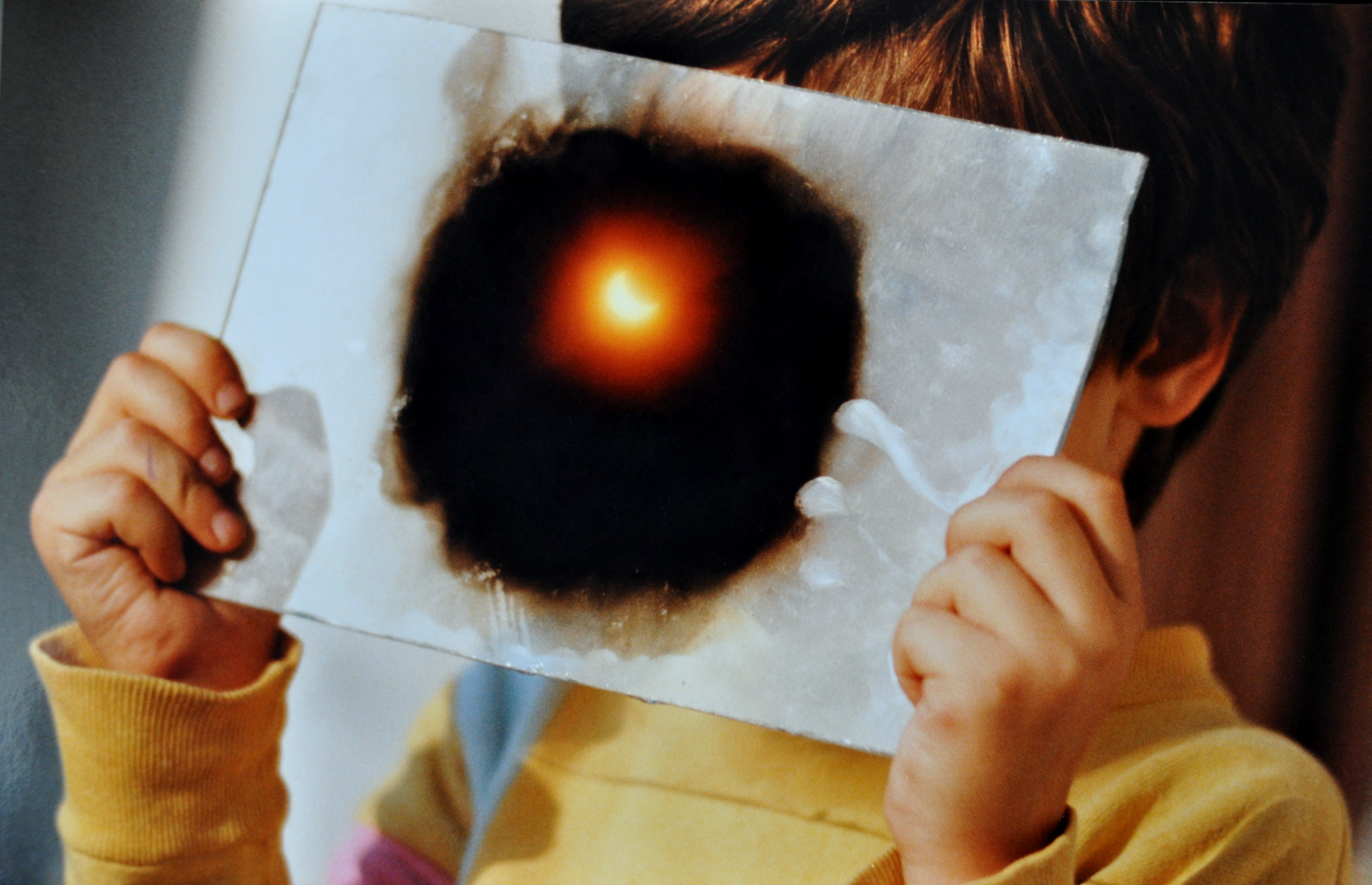
A child viewing solar eclipse with smoked glass in western Poland

== Eclipse timing ==
=== Places experiencing partial eclipse ===
Solar Eclipse of October 12, 1996 (Local Times)
Country or territory	City or place	Start of partial eclipse	Maximum eclipse	End of partial eclipse	Duration of eclipse (hr:min)	Maximum coverage
Greenland	Danmarkshavn	12:25:48	13:33:51	14:41:37	2:16	60.51%
Iceland	Reykjavík	12:23:48	13:37:45	14:51:16	2:27	52.30%
Faroe Islands	Tórshavn	13:38:35	14:54:51	16:08:35	2:30	58.04%
Ireland	Dublin	13:48:06	15:07:17	16:22:22	2:34	50.06%
Isle of Man	Douglas	13:49:19	15:08:15	16:22:59	2:34	51.88%
Norway	Oslo	14:58:31	16:13:32	17:24:07	2:26	62.36%
United Kingdom	London	13:58:43	15:17:37	16:31:15	2:33	50.89%
Sweden	Stockholm	15:06:24	16:19:42	17:28:13	2:22	63.12%
Netherlands	Amsterdam	15:03:49	16:21:38	17:33:52	2:30	53.80%
Finland	Helsinki	16:10:41	17:21:52	18:19:16 (sunset)	2:09	64.16%
Denmark	Copenhagen	15:07:14	16:22:38	17:32:41	2:25	59.21%
Estonia	Tallinn	16:11:54	17:23:12	18:21:29 (sunset)	2:10	63.61%
Belgium	Brussels	15:05:43	16:23:45	17:35:58	2:30	51.83%
France	Paris	15:06:34	16:25:04	17:37:32	2:31	48.61%
Latvia	Riga	15:16:07	16:27:43	17:28:29 (sunset)	2:12	61.51%
Germany	Berlin	15:13:50	16:29:09	17:38:33	2:25	56.06%
Spain	Madrid	15:15:03	16:32:01	17:43:38	2:28	33.48%
Russia	Moscow	17:28:22	18:32:35	18:36:28 (sunset)	1:08	58.99%
Lithuania	Vilnius	16:21:38	17:32:43	18:27:20 (sunset)	2:06	59.26%
Switzerland	Zurich	15:17:51	16:34:23	17:44:16	2:26	48.58%
Czech Republic	Prague	15:19:46	16:34:33	17:43:01	2:23	53.31%
Poland	Warsaw	15:22:36	16:35:05	17:41:39	2:19	56.49%
Belarus	Minsk	16:25:10	17:35:16	18:19:25 (sunset)	1:54	58.33%
Austria	Vienna	15:25:57	16:39:36	17:46:43	2:21	51.06%
Slovakia	Bratislava	15:26:55	16:40:14	17:47:03	2:20	51.05%
Hungary	Budapest	15:30:33	16:42:50	17:48:37	2:18	50.24%
Ukraine	Kyiv	16:35:00	17:43:04	18:12:09 (sunset)	1:37	53.78%
Italy	Rome	15:35:17	16:48:09	17:53:56	2:19	41.10%
Romania	Bucharest	16:44:50	17:52:26	18:36:23 (sunset)	1:52	45.35%
Bulgaria	Sofia	16:46:14	17:54:14	18:49:08 (sunset)	2:03	42.73%

== Eclipse details ==
Shown below are two tables displaying details about this particular solar eclipse. The first table outlines times at which the Moon's penumbra or umbra attains the specific parameter, and the second table describes various other parameters pertaining to this eclipse.

October 12, 1996 solar eclipse times
Event	Time (UTC)
First penumbral external contact	1996 October 12 at 12:00:31.3 UTC
Equatorial conjunction	1996 October 12 at 13:24:53.1 UTC
Greatest eclipse	1996 October 12 at 14:03:04.1 UTC
Ecliptic conjunction	1996 October 12 at 14:15:28.3 UTC
Last penumbral external contact	1996 October 12 at 16:05:49.4 UTC

October 12, 1996 solar eclipse parameters
Parameter	Value
Eclipse magnitude	0.75753
Eclipse obscuration	0.68285
Gamma	1.12265
Sun right ascension	13h12m04.5s
Sun declination	-07°38'15.5"
Sun semi-diameter	16'01.7"
Sun equatorial horizontal parallax	08.8"
Moon right ascension	13h13m17.1s
Moon declination	-06°38'00.7"
Moon semi-diameter	15'18.1"
Moon equatorial horizontal parallax	0°56'09.5"
ΔT	62.1 s

== Eclipse season ==
This eclipse is part of an eclipse season, a period, roughly every six months, when eclipses occur. Only two (or occasionally three) eclipse seasons occur each year, and each season lasts about 35 days and repeats just short of six months (173 days) later; thus two full eclipse seasons always occur each year. Either two or three eclipses happen each eclipse season. In the sequence below, each eclipse is separated by a fortnight.

Eclipse season of September–October 1996
September 27 Descending node (full moon)	October 12 Ascending node (new moon)
Total lunar eclipse Lunar Saros 127	Partial solar eclipse Solar Saros 153

== Related eclipses ==
=== Eclipses in 1996 ===
- A total lunar eclipse on April 4
- A partial solar eclipse on April 17
- A total lunar eclipse on September 27
- A partial solar eclipse on October 12

=== Metonic ===
- Preceded by: Solar eclipse of December 24, 1992
- Followed by: Solar eclipse of July 31, 2000

=== Tzolkinex ===
- Preceded by: Solar eclipse of August 31, 1989
- Followed by: Solar eclipse of November 23, 2003

=== Half-Saros ===
- Preceded by: Lunar eclipse of October 7, 1987
- Followed by: Lunar eclipse of October 17, 2005

=== Tritos ===
- Preceded by: Solar eclipse of November 12, 1985
- Followed by: Solar eclipse of September 11, 2007

=== Solar Saros 153 ===
- Preceded by: Solar eclipse of October 2, 1978
- Followed by: Solar eclipse of October 23, 2014

=== Inex ===
- Preceded by: Solar eclipse of November 2, 1967
- Followed by: Solar eclipse of September 21, 2025

=== Triad ===
- Preceded by: Solar eclipse of December 12, 1909
- Followed by: Solar eclipse of August 13, 2083

=== Solar eclipses of 1993–1996 ===
This eclipse is a member of a semester series. An eclipse in a semester series of solar eclipses repeats approximately every 177 days and 4 hours (a semester) at alternating nodes of the Moon's orbit.

Solar eclipse series sets from 1993 to 1996
Descending node			Ascending node		
Saros	Map	Gamma	Saros	Map	Gamma
118	May 21, 1993 Partial	1.1372	123	November 13, 1993 Partial	−1.0411
128 Partial in Bismarck, ND, USA	May 10, 1994 Annular	0.4077	133 Totality in Bolivia	November 3, 1994 Total	−0.3522
138	April 29, 1995 Annular	−0.3382	143 Totality in Dundlod, India	October 24, 1995 Total	0.3518
148	April 17, 1996 Partial	−1.058	153	October 12, 1996 Partial	1.1227

=== Saros 153 ===
This eclipse is a part of Saros series 153, repeating every 18 years, 11 days, and containing 70 events. The series started with a partial solar eclipse on July 28, 1870. It contains annular eclipses from December 17, 2104 through May 26, 2970. There are no hybrid or total eclipses in this set. The series ends at member 70 as a partial eclipse on August 22, 3114. Its eclipses are tabulated in three columns; every third eclipse in the same column is one exeligmos apart, so they all cast shadows over approximately the same parts of the Earth.

The longest duration of annularity will be produced by member 38 at 7 minutes, 1 seconds on September 5, 2537. All eclipses in this series occur at the Moon’s ascending node of orbit.

Series members 1–19 occur between 1870 and 2200:
1	2	3
July 28, 1870	August 7, 1888	August 20, 1906
4	5	6
August 30, 1924	September 10, 1942	September 20, 1960
7	8	9
October 2, 1978	October 12, 1996	October 23, 2014
10	11	12
November 3, 2032	November 14, 2050	November 24, 2068
13	14	15
December 6, 2086	December 17, 2104	December 28, 2122
16	17	18
January 8, 2141	January 19, 2159	January 29, 2177
19
February 10, 2195

=== Metonic series ===
The metonic series repeats eclipses every 19 years (6939.69 days), lasting about 5 cycles. Eclipses occur in nearly the same calendar date. In addition, the octon subseries repeats 1/5 of that or every 3.8 years (1387.94 days). All eclipses in this table occur at the Moon's ascending node.

22 eclipse events between December 24, 1916 and July 31, 2000
December 24–25	October 12	July 31–August 1	May 19–20	March 7
111	113	115	117	119
December 24, 1916		July 31, 1924	May 19, 1928	March 7, 1932
121	123	125	127	129
December 25, 1935	October 12, 1939	August 1, 1943	May 20, 1947	March 7, 1951
131	133	135	137	139
December 25, 1954	October 12, 1958	July 31, 1962	May 20, 1966	March 7, 1970
141	143	145	147	149
December 24, 1973	October 12, 1977	July 31, 1981	May 19, 1985	March 7, 1989
151	153	155		
December 24, 1992	October 12, 1996	July 31, 2000		

=== Tritos series ===
This eclipse is a part of a tritos cycle, repeating at alternating nodes every 135 synodic months (≈ 3986.63 days, or 11 years minus 1 month). Their appearance and longitude are irregular due to a lack of synchronization with the anomalistic month (period of perigee), but groupings of 3 tritos cycles (≈ 33 years minus 3 months) come close (≈ 434.044 anomalistic months), so eclipses are similar in these groupings.

The partial solar eclipse on November 4, 2116 (part of Saros 164) is also a part of this series but is not included in the table below.

Series members between 1801 and 2029
March 24, 1811 (Saros 136)	February 21, 1822 (Saros 137)	January 20, 1833 (Saros 138)	December 21, 1843 (Saros 139)	November 20, 1854 (Saros 140)
October 19, 1865 (Saros 141)	September 17, 1876 (Saros 142)	August 19, 1887 (Saros 143)	July 18, 1898 (Saros 144)	June 17, 1909 (Saros 145)
May 18, 1920 (Saros 146)	April 18, 1931 (Saros 147)	March 16, 1942 (Saros 148)	February 14, 1953 (Saros 149)	January 14, 1964 (Saros 150)
December 13, 1974 (Saros 151)	November 12, 1985 (Saros 152)	October 12, 1996 (Saros 153)	September 11, 2007 (Saros 154)	August 11, 2018 (Saros 155)
July 11, 2029 (Saros 156)

=== Inex series ===
This eclipse is a part of the long period inex cycle, repeating at alternating nodes, every 358 synodic months (≈ 10,571.95 days, or 29 years minus 20 days). Their appearance and longitude are irregular due to a lack of synchronization with the anomalistic month (period of perigee). However, groupings of 3 inex cycles (≈ 87 years minus 2 months) comes close (≈ 1,151.02 anomalistic months), so eclipses are similar in these groupings.

Series members between 1801 and 2200
February 11, 1823 (Saros 147)	January 21, 1852 (Saros 148)	December 31, 1880 (Saros 149)
December 12, 1909 (Saros 150)	November 21, 1938 (Saros 151)	November 2, 1967 (Saros 152)
October 12, 1996 (Saros 153)	September 21, 2025 (Saros 154)	September 2, 2054 (Saros 155)
August 13, 2083 (Saros 156)	July 23, 2112 (Saros 157)	July 3, 2141 (Saros 158)
June 14, 2170 (Saros 159)	May 24, 2199 (Saros 160)	
