= Solar eclipse of August 31, 1913 =

20th-century partial solar eclipse

- Partial eclipse
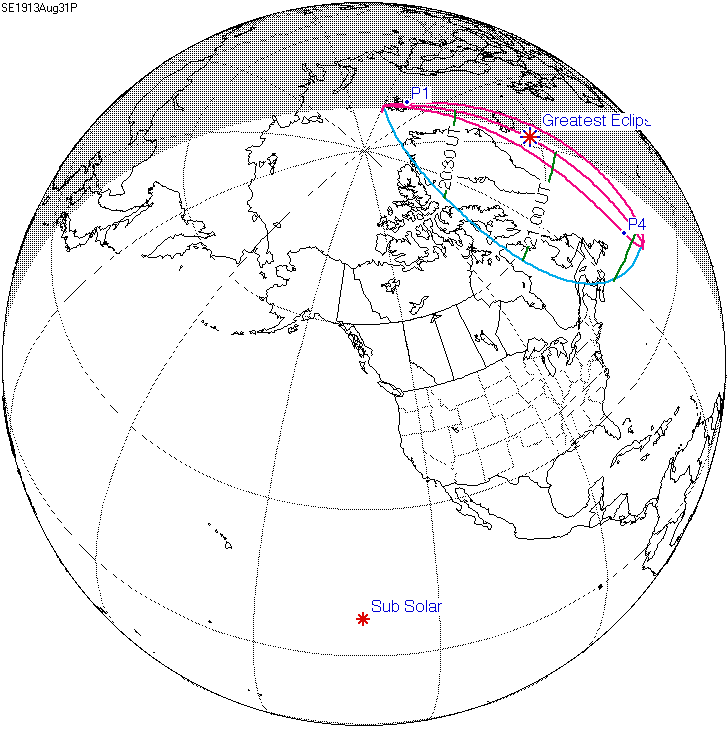
- Map
- Gamma: 1.4512
- Magnitude: 0.1513

Maximum eclipse
- Coordinates: 61.5°N 26.8°W

Times (UTC)
- Greatest eclipse: 20:52:12

References
- Saros: 114 (71 of 72)
- Catalog # (SE5000): 9312

A partial solar eclipse occurred at the Moon's descending node of orbit on Sunday, August 31, 1913, with a magnitude of 0.1513. A solar eclipse occurs when the Moon passes between Earth and the Sun, thereby totally or partly obscuring the image of the Sun for a viewer on Earth. A partial solar eclipse occurs in the polar regions of the Earth when the center of the Moon's shadow misses the Earth.

A partial eclipse was visible for parts of eastern Canada and Greenland.

== Eclipse details ==
Shown below are two tables displaying details about this particular solar eclipse. The first table outlines times at which the Moon's penumbra or umbra attains the specific parameter, and the second table describes various other parameters pertaining to this eclipse.

August 31, 1913 Solar Eclipse Times
Event	Time (UTC)
Equatorial Conjunction	1913 August 31 at 19:35:08.9 UTC
First Penumbral External Contact	1913 August 31 at 20:02:37.1 UTC
Ecliptic Conjunction	1913 August 31 at 20:38:01.7 UTC
Greatest Eclipse	1913 August 31 at 20:52:11.8 UTC
Last Penumbral External Contact	1913 August 31 at 21:42:17.1 UTC

August 31, 1913 Solar Eclipse Parameters
Parameter	Value
Eclipse Magnitude	0.15134
Eclipse Obscuration	0.06998
Gamma	1.45121
Sun Right Ascension	10h37m57.1s
Sun Declination	+08°38'38.2"
Sun Semi-Diameter	15'51.0"
Sun Equatorial Horizontal Parallax	08.7"
Moon Right Ascension	10h40m42.4s
Moon Declination	+09°57'27.7"
Moon Semi-Diameter	16'42.1"
Moon Equatorial Horizontal Parallax	1°01'17.9"
ΔT	15.5 s

== Eclipse season ==
This eclipse is part of an eclipse season, a period, roughly every six months, when eclipses occur. Only two (or occasionally three) eclipse seasons occur each year, and each season lasts about 35 days and repeats just short of six months (173 days) later; thus two full eclipse seasons always occur each year. Either two or three eclipses happen each eclipse season. In the sequence below, each eclipse is separated by a fortnight. The first and last eclipse in this sequence is separated by one synodic month.

Eclipse season of August–September 1913
August 31 Descending node (new moon)	September 15 Ascending node (full moon)	September 30 Descending node (new moon)
Partial solar eclipse Solar Saros 114	Total lunar eclipse Lunar Saros 126	Partial solar eclipse Solar Saros 152

== Related eclipses ==
=== Eclipses in 1913 ===
- A total lunar eclipse on March 22.
- A partial solar eclipse on April 6.
- A partial solar eclipse on August 31.
- A total lunar eclipse on September 15.
- A partial solar eclipse on September 30.

=== Metonic ===
- Followed by: Solar eclipse of June 19, 1917

=== Tzolkinex ===
- Preceded by: Solar eclipse of July 21, 1906

=== Tritos ===
- Followed by: Solar eclipse of July 31, 1924

=== Solar Saros 114 ===
- Preceded by: Solar eclipse of August 20, 1895
- Followed by: Solar eclipse of September 12, 1931

=== Inex ===
- Followed by: Solar eclipse of August 12, 1942

=== Triad ===
- Preceded by: Solar eclipse of October 31, 1826
- Followed by: Solar eclipse of July 1, 2000

=== Solar eclipses of 1913–1917 ===
This eclipse is a member of a semester series. An eclipse in a semester series of solar eclipses repeats approximately every 177 days and 4 hours (a semester) at alternating nodes of the Moon's orbit.

The partial solar eclipses on April 6, 1913 and September 30, 1913 occur in the previous lunar year eclipse set, and the solar eclipses on December 24, 1916 (partial), June 19, 1917 (partial), and December 14, 1917 (annular) occur in the next lunar year eclipse set.

Solar eclipse series sets from 1913 to 1917
Descending node			Ascending node		
Saros	Map	Gamma	Saros	Map	Gamma
114	August 31, 1913 Partial	1.4512	119	February 25, 1914 Annular	−0.9416
124	August 21, 1914 Total	0.7655	129	February 14, 1915 Annular	−0.2024
134	August 10, 1915 Annular	0.0124	139	February 3, 1916 Total	0.4987
144	July 30, 1916 Annular	−0.7709	149	January 23, 1917 Partial	1.1508
154	July 19, 1917 Partial	−1.5101			

=== Saros 114 ===
This eclipse is a part of Saros series 114, repeating every 18 years, 11 days, and containing 72 events. The series started with a partial solar eclipse on July 23, 651 AD. It contains annular eclipses from February 3, 976 AD through June 11, 1192; hybrid eclipses from June 22, 1210 through December 1, 1480; and total eclipses from December 13, 1498 through June 15, 1787. The series ends at member 72 as a partial eclipse on September 12, 1931. Its eclipses are tabulated in three columns; every third eclipse in the same column is one exeligmos apart, so they all cast shadows over approximately the same parts of the Earth.

The longest duration of annularity was produced by member 20 at 4 minutes, 33 seconds on February 13, 994 AD, and the longest duration of totality was produced by member 59 at 4 minutes, 18 seconds on April 21, 1697. All eclipses in this series occur at the Moon’s descending node of orbit.

Series members 65–72 occur between 1801 and 1931:
65	66	67
June 26, 1805	July 8, 1823	July 18, 1841
68	69	70
July 29, 1859	August 9, 1877	August 20, 1895
71	72	
August 31, 1913	September 12, 1931	

=== Metonic series ===
The metonic series repeats eclipses every 19 years (6939.69 days), lasting about 5 cycles. Eclipses occur in nearly the same calendar date. In addition, the octon subseries repeats 1/5 of that or every 3.8 years (1387.94 days). All eclipses in this table occur at the Moon's descending node.

22 eclipse events between April 8, 1902 and August 31, 1989
April 7–8	January 24–25	November 12	August 31–September 1	June 19–20
108	110	112	114	116
April 8, 1902			August 31, 1913	June 19, 1917
118	120	122	124	126
April 8, 1921	January 24, 1925	November 12, 1928	August 31, 1932	June 19, 1936
128	130	132	134	136
April 7, 1940	January 25, 1944	November 12, 1947	September 1, 1951	June 20, 1955
138	140	142	144	146
April 8, 1959	January 25, 1963	November 12, 1966	August 31, 1970	June 20, 1974
148	150	152	154	
April 7, 1978	January 25, 1982	November 12, 1985	August 31, 1989	

=== Tritos series ===
This eclipse is a part of a tritos cycle, repeating at alternating nodes every 135 synodic months (≈ 3986.63 days, or 11 years minus 1 month). Their appearance and longitude are irregular due to a lack of synchronization with the anomalistic month (period of perigee), but groupings of 3 tritos cycles (≈ 33 years minus 3 months) come close (≈ 434.044 anomalistic months), so eclipses are similar in these groupings.

Series members between 1837 and 2200
April 5, 1837 (Saros 107)	March 5, 1848 (Saros 108)	February 3, 1859 (Saros 109)		December 2, 1880 (Saros 111)
		August 31, 1913 (Saros 114)	July 31, 1924 (Saros 115)	June 30, 1935 (Saros 116)
May 30, 1946 (Saros 117)	April 30, 1957 (Saros 118)	March 28, 1968 (Saros 119)	February 26, 1979 (Saros 120)	January 26, 1990 (Saros 121)
December 25, 2000 (Saros 122)	November 25, 2011 (Saros 123)	October 25, 2022 (Saros 124)	September 23, 2033 (Saros 125)	August 23, 2044 (Saros 126)
July 24, 2055 (Saros 127)	June 22, 2066 (Saros 128)	May 22, 2077 (Saros 129)	April 21, 2088 (Saros 130)	March 21, 2099 (Saros 131)
February 18, 2110 (Saros 132)	January 19, 2121 (Saros 133)	December 19, 2131 (Saros 134)	November 17, 2142 (Saros 135)	October 17, 2153 (Saros 136)
September 16, 2164 (Saros 137)	August 16, 2175 (Saros 138)	July 16, 2186 (Saros 139)	June 15, 2197 (Saros 140)	

=== Inex series ===
This eclipse is a part of the long period inex cycle, repeating at alternating nodes, every 358 synodic months (≈ 10,571.95 days, or 29 years minus 20 days). Their appearance and longitude are irregular due to a lack of synchronization with the anomalistic month (period of perigee). However, groupings of 3 inex cycles (≈ 87 years minus 2 months) comes close (≈ 1,151.02 anomalistic months), so eclipses are similar in these groupings.

Series members between 1801 and 2200
October 31, 1826 (Saros 111)		
August 31, 1913 (Saros 114)	August 12, 1942 (Saros 115)	July 22, 1971 (Saros 116)
July 1, 2000 (Saros 117)	June 12, 2029 (Saros 118)	May 22, 2058 (Saros 119)
May 2, 2087 (Saros 120)	April 13, 2116 (Saros 121)	March 23, 2145 (Saros 122)
March 3, 2174 (Saros 123)		
