= Solar eclipse of May 3, 1715 =

Total eclipse

- Total eclipse
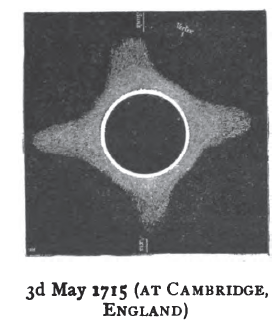
- Observations from Cambridge, England, drawing of the corona around the eclipsed Sun.

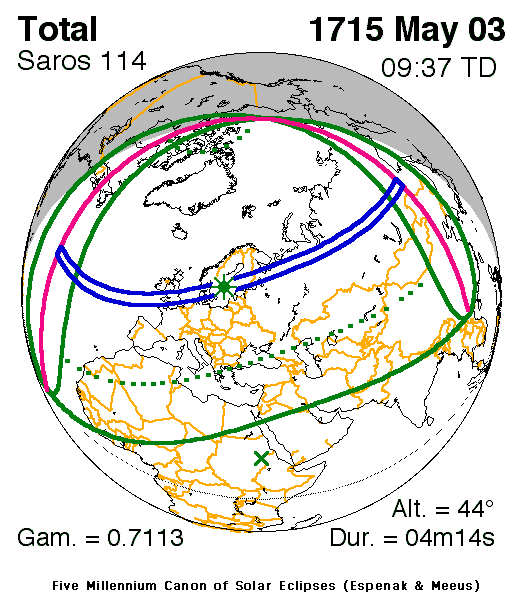
- Map
- Gamma: 0.7112
- Magnitude: 1.0632

Maximum eclipse
- Duration: 254 s (4 min 14 s)
- Coordinates: 59.4°N 17.9°E
- Max. width of band: 295 km (183 mi)

Times (UTC)
- Greatest eclipse: 9:36:30

References
- Saros: 114 (60 of 72)
- Catalog # (SE5000): 8826

This animation shows the eclipse path over the Kingdom of Great Britain and northern Europe. The wide (faint) shadow shows for the penumbra (partiality), and the smaller dark shadow shows for the umbra (totality).

A total solar eclipse occurred on 3 May 1715. It was known as Halley's Eclipse, after Edmond Halley (1656–1742), as he had predicted the eclipse.

== Observation ==
Edmond Halley predicted the time and location of the eclipse, and drew a map of the path of totality. His predictions were four minutes and 30 km off, mainly due to his use of inaccurate lunar ephemeris. After the eclipse, which he viewed from London, he corrected the eclipse path and added the path and description of the 1724 total solar eclipse.

Drawing upon lunar tables made by the first Astronomer Royal John Flamsteed, William Whiston produced a more technical predictive eclipse map around the same time as Halley. Both Halley's and Whiston's maps were published by John Senex in March 1715.

Totality was observed in the Kingdom of Great Britain from Cornwall in the south-west to Lincolnshire and Norfolk in the east. It was also observed in Ireland, where large crowds turned out in Dublin to watch it: the weather in Dublin was exceptionally cold and wet, and the eminent judge Joseph Deane caught a fatal chill as a result, although Elrington Ball more prosaically states that his death was probably due to gout. In London, there were 3 minutes and 33 seconds of totality.

Great Britain did not adopt the Gregorian calendar until 1752, so the date was at the time 22 April 1715.

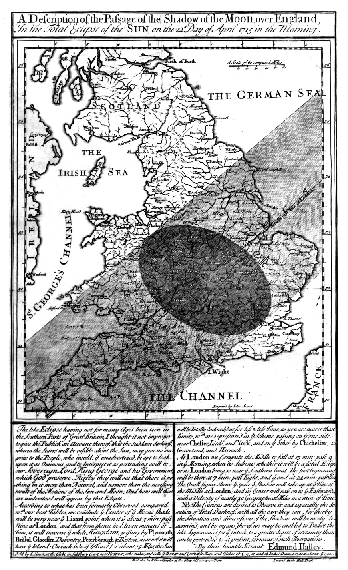
A predictive map made by Halley for the path of the Moon's umbral shadow

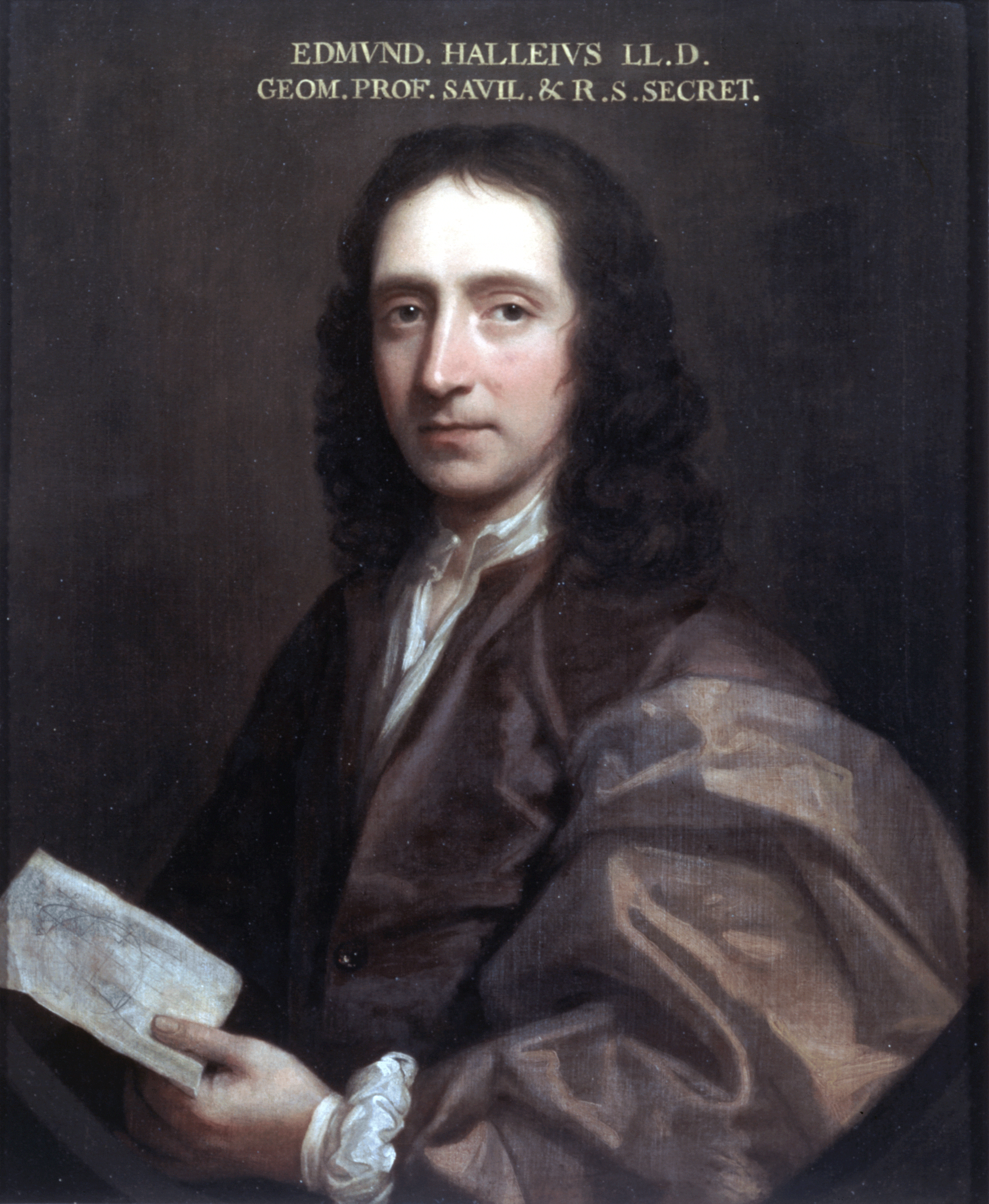
Edmond Halley

== Related eclipses ==
It is a part of Solar Saros 114.

== See also ==
- List of solar eclipses visible from the United Kingdom 1000–2090 AD
