= Solar eclipse of September 12, 1931 =

20th-century partial solar eclipse

- Partial eclipse
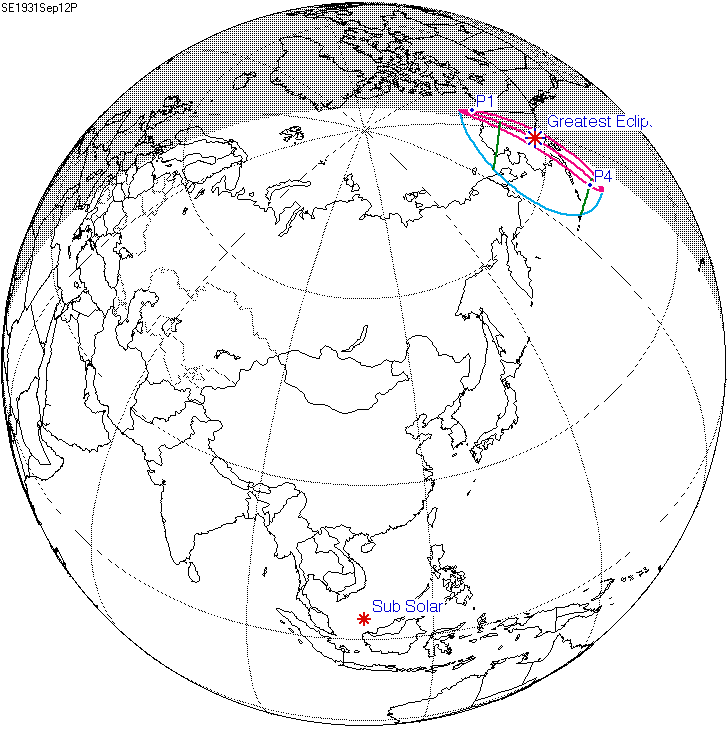
- Map
- Gamma: 1.506
- Magnitude: 0.0471

Maximum eclipse
- Coordinates: 61.2°N 152.8°W

Times (UTC)
- Greatest eclipse: 4:41:25

References
- Saros: 114 (72 of 72)
- Catalog # (SE5000): 9355

A partial solar eclipse occurred at the Moon's descending node of orbit on Saturday, September 12, 1931, with a magnitude of 0.0471. A solar eclipse occurs when the Moon passes between Earth and the Sun, thereby totally or partly obscuring the image of the Sun for a viewer on Earth. A partial solar eclipse occurs in the polar regions of the Earth when the center of the Moon's shadow misses the Earth.

A partial eclipse was visible for parts of Alaska. This was the 72nd and final event from Solar Saros 114.

== Eclipse details ==
Shown below are two tables displaying details about this particular solar eclipse. The first table outlines times at which the Moon's penumbra or umbra attains the specific parameter, and the second table describes various other parameters pertaining to this eclipse.

September 12, 1931 Solar Eclipse Times
Event	Time (UTC)
Equatorial Conjunction	1931 September 12 at 03:17:27.4 UTC
First Penumbral External Contact	1931 September 12 at 04:13:32.8 UTC
Ecliptic Conjunction	1931 September 12 at 04:26:43.8 UTC
Greatest Eclipse	1931 September 12 at 04:41:24.8 UTC
Last Penumbral External Contact	1931 September 12 at 05:09:49.8 UTC

September 12, 1931 Solar Eclipse Parameters
Parameter	Value
Eclipse Magnitude	0.04713
Eclipse Obscuration	0.01234
Gamma	1.50603
Sun Right Ascension	11h17m33.8s
Sun Declination	+04°33'58.3"
Sun Semi-Diameter	15'53.5"
Sun Equatorial Horizontal Parallax	08.7"
Moon Right Ascension	11h20m30.0s
Moon Declination	+05°54'53.5"
Moon Semi-Diameter	16'41.5"
Moon Equatorial Horizontal Parallax	1°01'15.6"
ΔT	23.9 s

== Eclipse season ==
This eclipse is part of an eclipse season, a period, roughly every six months, when eclipses occur. Only two (or occasionally three) eclipse seasons occur each year, and each season lasts about 35 days and repeats just short of six months (173 days) later; thus two full eclipse seasons always occur each year. Either two or three eclipses happen each eclipse season. In the sequence below, each eclipse is separated by a fortnight. The first and last eclipse in this sequence is separated by one synodic month.

Eclipse season of September–October 1931
September 12 Descending node (new moon)	September 26 Ascending node (full moon)	October 11 Descending node (new moon)
Partial solar eclipse Solar Saros 114	Total lunar eclipse Lunar Saros 126	Partial solar eclipse Solar Saros 152

== Related eclipses ==
=== Eclipses in 1931 ===
- A total lunar eclipse on April 2.
- A partial solar eclipse on April 18.
- A partial solar eclipse on September 12.
- A total lunar eclipse on September 26.
- A partial solar eclipse on October 11.

=== Metonic ===
- Followed by: Solar eclipse of June 30, 1935

=== Tzolkinex ===
- Preceded by: Solar eclipse of July 31, 1924

=== Tritos ===
- Followed by: Solar eclipse of August 12, 1942

=== Solar Saros 114 ===
- Preceded by: Solar eclipse of August 31, 1913

=== Triad ===
- Preceded by: Solar eclipse of November 10, 1844
- Followed by: Solar eclipse of July 13, 2018

=== Solar eclipses of 1931–1935 ===
This eclipse is a member of a semester series. An eclipse in a semester series of solar eclipses repeats approximately every 177 days and 4 hours (a semester) at alternating nodes of the Moon's orbit.

The partial solar eclipses on April 18, 1931 and October 11, 1931 occur in the previous lunar year eclipse set, and the solar eclipses on January 5, 1935 (partial), June 30, 1935 (partial), and December 25, 1935 (annular) occur in the next lunar year eclipse set.

Solar eclipse series sets from 1931 to 1935
Descending node			Ascending node		
Saros	Map	Gamma	Saros	Map	Gamma
114	September 12, 1931 Partial	1.506	119	March 7, 1932 Annular	−0.9673
124	August 31, 1932 Total	0.8307	129	February 24, 1933 Annular	−0.2191
134	August 21, 1933 Annular	0.0869	139	February 14, 1934 Total	0.4868
144	August 10, 1934 Annular	−0.689	149	February 3, 1935 Partial	1.1438
154	July 30, 1935 Partial	−1.4259			

=== Saros 114 ===
This eclipse is a part of Saros series 114, repeating every 18 years, 11 days, and containing 72 events. The series started with a partial solar eclipse on July 23, 651 AD. It contains annular eclipses from February 3, 976 AD through June 11, 1192; hybrid eclipses from June 22, 1210 through December 1, 1480; and total eclipses from December 13, 1498 through June 15, 1787. The series ends at member 72 as a partial eclipse on September 12, 1931. Its eclipses are tabulated in three columns; every third eclipse in the same column is one exeligmos apart, so they all cast shadows over approximately the same parts of the Earth.

The longest duration of annularity was produced by member 20 at 4 minutes, 33 seconds on February 13, 994 AD, and the longest duration of totality was produced by member 59 at 4 minutes, 18 seconds on April 21, 1697. All eclipses in this series occur at the Moon’s descending node of orbit.

Series members 65–72 occur between 1801 and 1931:
65	66	67
June 26, 1805	July 8, 1823	July 18, 1841
68	69	70
July 29, 1859	August 9, 1877	August 20, 1895
71	72	
August 31, 1913	September 12, 1931	

=== Metonic series ===
The metonic series repeats eclipses every 19 years (6939.69 days), lasting about 5 cycles. Eclipses occur in nearly the same calendar date. In addition, the octon subseries repeats 1/5 of that or every 3.8 years (1387.94 days). All eclipses in this table occur at the Moon's descending node.

22 eclipse events between September 12, 1931 and July 1, 2011
September 11–12	June 30–July 1	April 17–19	February 4–5	November 22–23
114	116	118	120	122
September 12, 1931	June 30, 1935	April 19, 1939	February 4, 1943	November 23, 1946
124	126	128	130	132
September 12, 1950	June 30, 1954	April 19, 1958	February 5, 1962	November 23, 1965
134	136	138	140	142
September 11, 1969	June 30, 1973	April 18, 1977	February 4, 1981	November 22, 1984
144	146	148	150	152
September 11, 1988	June 30, 1992	April 17, 1996	February 5, 2000	November 23, 2003
154	156			
September 11, 2007	July 1, 2011			

=== Tritos series ===
This eclipse is a part of a tritos cycle, repeating at alternating nodes every 135 synodic months (≈ 3986.63 days, or 11 years minus 1 month). Their appearance and longitude are irregular due to a lack of synchronization with the anomalistic month (period of perigee), but groupings of 3 tritos cycles (≈ 33 years minus 3 months) come close (≈ 434.044 anomalistic months), so eclipses are similar in these groupings.

Series members between 1866 and 2200
March 16, 1866 (Saros 108)			December 13, 1898 (Saros 111)	
	September 12, 1931 (Saros 114)	August 12, 1942 (Saros 115)	July 11, 1953 (Saros 116)	June 10, 1964 (Saros 117)
May 11, 1975 (Saros 118)	April 9, 1986 (Saros 119)	March 9, 1997 (Saros 120)	February 7, 2008 (Saros 121)	January 6, 2019 (Saros 122)
December 5, 2029 (Saros 123)	November 4, 2040 (Saros 124)	October 4, 2051 (Saros 125)	September 3, 2062 (Saros 126)	August 3, 2073 (Saros 127)
July 3, 2084 (Saros 128)	June 2, 2095 (Saros 129)	May 3, 2106 (Saros 130)	April 2, 2117 (Saros 131)	March 1, 2128 (Saros 132)
January 30, 2139 (Saros 133)	December 30, 2149 (Saros 134)	November 27, 2160 (Saros 135)	October 29, 2171 (Saros 136)	September 27, 2182 (Saros 137)
August 26, 2193 (Saros 138)

=== Inex series ===
This eclipse is a part of the long period inex cycle, repeating at alternating nodes, every 358 synodic months (≈ 10,571.95 days, or 29 years minus 20 days). Their appearance and longitude are irregular due to a lack of synchronization with the anomalistic month (period of perigee). However, groupings of 3 inex cycles (≈ 87 years minus 2 months) comes close (≈ 1,151.02 anomalistic months), so eclipses are similar in these groupings.

Series members between 1844 and 2200
November 10, 1844 (Saros 111)		
September 12, 1931 (Saros 114)		
July 13, 2018 (Saros 117)	June 23, 2047 (Saros 118)	June 1, 2076 (Saros 119)
May 14, 2105 (Saros 120)	April 24, 2134 (Saros 121)	April 3, 2163 (Saros 122)
March 13, 2192 (Saros 123)		
