= Lunar Saros 104 =

Series of lunar eclipses

Saros cycle series 104 for lunar eclipses occurred at the moon's ascending node, 18 years 11 and 1/3 days. It contained 72 events.

This lunar saros was linked to Solar Saros 111.

Cat.	Saros	Mem	Date	Time UT (hr:mn)	Type	Gamma	Magnitude	Duration (min)			Contacts UT (hr:mn)						Chart
Cat.	Saros	Mem	Date	Greatest	Type	Gamma	Magnitude	Pen.	Par.	Tot.	P1	P4	U1	U2	U3	U4	Chart
05969	104	1	483 Aug 4	10:31:02	Penumbral	1.492	-0.8541	81.3			9:50:23	11:11:41					
06015	104	2	501 Aug 14	18:18:54	Penumbral	1.4366	-0.7533	116.4			17:20:42	19:17:06					
06060	104	3	519 Aug 26	2:14:07	Penumbral	1.3870	-0.6634	139.9			1:04:10	3:24:04					
06105	104	4	537 Sep 05	10:16:09	Penumbral	1.3429	-0.5836	157.4			8:57:27	11:34:51					
06151	104	5	555 Sep 16	18:26:52	Penumbral	1.3058	-0.5171	170.4			17:01:40	19:52:04					
06197	104	6	573 Sep 27	2:44:59	Penumbral	1.2751	-0.4621	180.3			1:14:50	4:15:08					
06243	104	7	591 Oct 08	11:11:50	Penumbral	1.2514	-0.4200	187.6			9:38:02	12:45:38					
06291	104	8	609 Oct 18	19:44:15	Penumbral	1.2323	-0.3863	193.2			18:07:39	21:20:51					
06337	104	9	627 Oct 30	4:24:39	Penumbral	1.2200	-0.3649	196.9			2:46:12	6:03:06					
06383	104	10	645 Nov 09	13:09:24	Penumbral	1.2114	-0.3503	199.5			11:29:39	14:49:09					
06428	104	11	663 Nov 20	21:59:12	Penumbral	1.2073	-0.3437	200.9			20:18:45	23:39:39					
06473	104	12	681 Dec 01	6:50:31	Penumbral	1.2047	-0.3397	201.9			5:09:34	8:31:28					
06519	104	13	699 Dec 12	15:43:47	Penumbral	1.2041	-0.3391	202.3			14:02:38	17:24:56					
06563	104	14	717 Dec 23	0:35:34	Penumbral	1.2028	-0.3370	202.9			22:54:07	2:17:01					
06606	104	15	736 Jan 03	9:25:09	Penumbral	1.2004	-0.3326	203.8			7:43:15	11:07:03					
06651	104	16	754 Jan 13	18:10:39	Penumbral	1.1951	-0.3229	205.4			16:27:57	19:53:21					
06695	104	17	772 Jan 25	2:51:28	Penumbral	1.1870	-0.3076	207.6			1:07:40	4:35:16					
06737	104	18	790 Feb 04	11:24:47	Penumbral	1.1732	-0.2819	211.3			9:39:08	13:10:26					
06779	104	19	808 Feb 15	19:51:09	Penumbral	1.1543	-0.2468	216.0			18:03:09	21:39:09					
06820	104	20	826 Feb 26	4:08:47	Penumbral	1.1290	-0.1999	222.1			2:17:44	5:59:50					
06860	104	21	844 Mar 08	12:19:11	Penumbral	1.0985	-0.1435	229.0			10:24:41	14:13:41					
06901	104	22	862 Mar 19	20:18:53	Penumbral	1.0598	-0.0721	237.4			18:20:11	22:17:35					
06942	104	23	880 Mar 30	4:11:45	Partial	1.0161	0.0084	246.2	20.4		2:08:39	6:14:51	4:01:33			4:21:57	
06984	104	24	898 Apr 10	11:55:02	Partial	0.9647	0.1027	255.8	70.4		9:47:08	14:02:56	11:19:50			12:30:14	
07025	104	25	916 Apr 20	19:32:10	Partial	0.9090	0.2049	265.4	98.2		17:19:28	21:44:52	18:43:04			20:21:16	
07065	104	26	934 May 2	3:00:10	Partial	0.8463	0.3196	275.4	121.0		0:42:28	5:17:52	1:59:40			4:00:40	
07106	104	27	952 May 12	10:23:59	Partial	0.7807	0.4394	284.9	139.8		8:01:32	12:46:26	9:14:05			11:33:53	
07146	104	28	970 May 23	17:41:28	Partial	0.7102	0.5678	294.2	156.2		15:14:22	20:08:34	16:23:22			18:59:34	
07187	104	29	988 Jun 03	0:55:42	Partial	0.6377	0.6996	302.9	170.3		22:24:15	3:27:09	23:30:33			2:20:51	
07231	104	30	1006 Jun 14	8:06:25	Partial	0.5629	0.8354	310.9	182.4		5:30:58	10:41:52	6:35:13			9:37:37	
07276	104	31	1024 Jun 24	15:16:44	Partial	0.4885	0.9702	318.1	192.6		12:37:41	17:55:47	13:40:26			16:53:02	
07320	104	32	1042 Jul 05	22:26:38	Total	0.4145	1.1039	324.4	201.0	48.5	19:44:26	1:08:50	20:46:08	22:02:23	22:50:53	0:07:08	
07365	104	33	1060 Jul 16	5:37:00	Total	0.3417	1.2352	330.0	207.8	70.2	2:52:00	8:22:00	3:53:06	5:01:54	6:12:06	7:20:54	
07409	104	34	1078 Jul 27	12:50:23	Total	0.2721	1.3602	334.7	213.2	83.3	10:03:02	15:37:44	11:03:47	12:08:44	13:32:02	14:36:59	
07455	104	35	1096 Aug 06	20:07:07	Total	0.2060	1.4788	338.6	217.2	91.9	17:17:49	22:56:25	18:18:31	19:21:10	20:53:04	21:55:43	
07501	104	36	1114 Aug 18	3:29:04	Total	0.1451	1.5875	341.9	220.1	97.3	0:38:07	6:20:01	1:39:01	2:40:25	4:17:43	5:19:07	
07547	104	37	1132 Aug 28	10:55:54	Total	0.089	1.6873	344.6	222.1	100.6	8:03:36	13:48:12	9:04:51	10:05:36	11:46:12	12:46:57	
07593	104	38	1150 Sep 8	18:30:27	Total	0.0401	1.774	346.9	223.3	102.1	15:37:00	21:23:54	16:38:48	17:39:24	19:21:30	20:22:06	
07641	104	39	1168 Sep 19	2:11:28	Total	-0.0028	1.8393	348.8	224	102.6	23:17:04	5:05:52	0:19:28	1:20:10	3:02:46	4:03:28	
07687	104	40	1186 Sep 30	9:59:19	Total	-0.0392	1.7692	350.5	224.4	102.2	7:04:04	12:54:34	8:07:07	9:08:13	10:50:25	11:51:31	
07733	104	41	1204 Oct 10	17:54:16	Total	-0.0691	1.7113	352.0	224.5	101.4	14:58:16	20:50:16	16:02:01	17:03:34	18:44:58	19:46:31	
07779	104	42	1222 Oct 22	1:56:29	Total	-0.0919	1.6665	353.4	224.6	100.5	22:59:47	4:53:11	0:04:11	1:06:14	2:46:44	3:48:47	
07825	104	43	1240 Nov 01	10:04:27	Total	-0.1096	1.6314	354.8	224.7	99.6	7:07:03	13:01:51	8:12:06	9:14:39	10:54:15	11:56:48	
07870	104	44	1258 Nov 12	18:16:59	Total	-0.1227	1.6049	356.2	224.8	98.9	15:18:53	21:15:05	16:24:35	17:27:32	19:06:26	20:09:23	
07915	104	45	1276 Nov 23	2:33:30	Total	-0.1316	1.5863	357.5	225.0	98.3	23:34:45	5:32:15	0:41:00	1:44:21	3:22:39	4:26:00	
07960	104	46	1294 Dec 04	10:52:56	Total	-0.1372	1.5741	358.8	225.3	98.0	7:53:32	13:52:20	9:00:17	10:03:56	11:41:56	12:45:35	
08005	104	47	1312 Dec 14	19:11:58	Total	-0.1424	1.5630	360.0	225.7	97.7	16:11:58	22:11:58	17:19:07	18:23:07	20:00:49	21:04:49	
08048	104	48	1330 Dec 26	3:30:41	Total	-0.1471	1.5532	361.1	226.0	97.5	0:30:08	6:31:14	1:37:41	2:41:56	4:19:26	5:23:41	
08089	104	49	1349 Jan 05	11:45:40	Total	-0.1541	1.5395	362.1	226.3	97.1	8:44:37	14:46:43	9:52:31	10:57:07	12:34:13	13:38:49	
08130	104	50	1367 Jan 16	19:57:34	Total	-0.1629	1.5227	362.9	226.5	96.5	16:56:07	22:59:01	18:04:19	19:09:19	20:45:49	21:50:49	
08171	104	51	1385 Jan 27	4:01:25	Total	-0.1775	1.4957	363.5	226.5	95.3	0:59:40	7:03:10	2:08:10	3:13:46	4:49:04	5:54:40	
08212	104	52	1403 Feb 07	12:00:03	Total	-0.1958	1.4622	363.8	226.2	93.6	8:58:09	15:01:57	10:06:57	11:13:15	12:46:51	13:53:09	
08253	104	53	1421 Feb 17	19:48:27	Total	-0.2216	1.4150	363.8	225.4	90.6	16:46:33	22:50:21	17:55:45	19:03:09	20:33:45	21:41:09	
08295	104	54	1439 Mar 01	3:28:54	Total	-0.2536	1.3568	363.4	224.1	86.2	0:27:12	6:30:36	1:36:51	2:45:48	4:12:00	5:20:57	
08336	104	55	1457 Mar 11	10:57:52	Total	-0.2944	1.2823	362.4	221.9	79.1	7:56:40	13:59:04	9:06:55	10:18:19	11:37:25	12:48:49	
08377	104	56	1475 Mar 22	18:18:39	Total	-0.3413	1.1969	360.8	218.7	68.2	15:18:15	21:19:03	16:29:18	17:44:33	18:52:45	20:08:00	
08417	104	57	1493 Apr 02	1:28:34	Total	-0.3964	1.0963	358.3	214.0	49.5	22:29:25	4:27:43	23:41:34	1:03:49	1:53:19	3:15:34	
08457	104	58	1511 Apr 13	8:29:06	Partial	-0.4585	0.9828	354.7	207.5		5:31:45	11:26:27	6:45:21			10:12:51	
08498	104	59	1529 Apr 23	15:20:28	Partial	-0.5277	0.8563	349.9	198.6		12:25:31	18:15:25	13:41:10			16:59:46	
08539	104	60	1547 May 4	22:04:32	Partial	-0.6022	0.7198	343.7	186.8		19:12:41	0:56:23	20:31:08			23:37:56	
08583	104	61	1565 May 15	4:41:16	Partial	-0.6820	0.5736	335.7	171.1		1:53:25	7:29:07	3:15:43			6:06:49	
08626	104	62	1583 Jun 05	11:12:22	Partial	-0.7655	0.4203	325.9	150.3		8:29:25	13:55:19	9:57:13			12:27:31	
08669	104	63	1601 Jun 15	17:39:34	Partial	-0.8517	0.2621	314.1	121.7		15:02:31	20:16:37	16:38:43			18:40:25	
08714	104	64	1619 Jun 27	0:04:48	Partial	-0.9389	0.1017	300.2	77.7		21:34:42	2:34:54	23:25:57			0:43:39	
08758	104	65	1637 Jul 07	6:28:09	Penumbral	-1.0270	-0.0604	283.9			4:06:12	8:50:06					
08802	104	66	1655 Jul 18	12:53:09	Penumbral	-1.1131	-0.2192	265.4			10:40:27	15:05:51					
08847	104	67	1673 Jul 28	19:20:13	Penumbral	-1.1971	-0.3740	244.2			17:18:07	21:22:19					
08893	104	68	1691 Aug 09	1:52:19	Penumbral	-1.2766	-0.5210	220.6			0:02:01	3:42:37					
08939	104	69	1709 Aug 20	8:27:54	Penumbral	-1.3529	-0.6622	193.5			6:51:09	10:04:39					
08986	104	70	1727 Aug 31	15:12:00	Penumbral	-1.4223	-0.7907	163.4			13:50:18	16:33:42					
09032	104	71	1745 Sep 10	22:02:28	Penumbral	-1.4863	-0.9095	127.5			20:58:43	23:06:13					
09079	104	72	1763 Sep 22	5:02:59	Penumbral	-1.5421	-1.0131	82.5			4:21:44	5:44:14					

== See also ==
- List of lunar eclipses
  - List of Saros series for lunar eclipses
