= Gaferut =

Atoll in the Federated States of Micronesia

Coordinates: 9°14′N 145°23′E

Location of Gaferut in the Pacific Ocean

Gaferut Atoll is an outlying atoll in the State of Yap in the Federated States of Micronesia. The northernmost of the eastern group of islands of Yap, it is located 100 kilometers northeast of Faraulep and 790 kilometers east of Yap island.

Gaferut is called Fayo by the people of the neighboring atolls, which means stone or rock in the Woleaian language. It belongs to the Faraulep people.

The island is 500 meters (1500 feet) long and 150 meters (500 feet) wide, and less than 10 hectares in area. It lies in the southeast of a reef that is 1.5 km long and one kilometer wide.

The vegetation consists of Tournefortia argentea and Cocos nucifera.
