= Faraulep =

Coral atoll in the Pacific Ocean

Coordinates: 8°36′N 144°33′E

Faraulep Feshaiulap
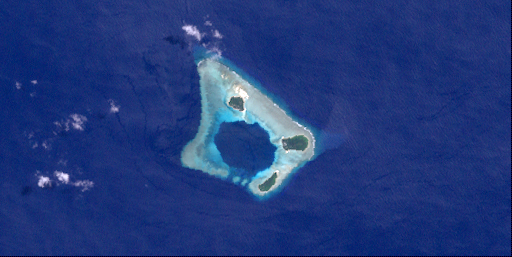
- NASA picture of Faraulep Atoll

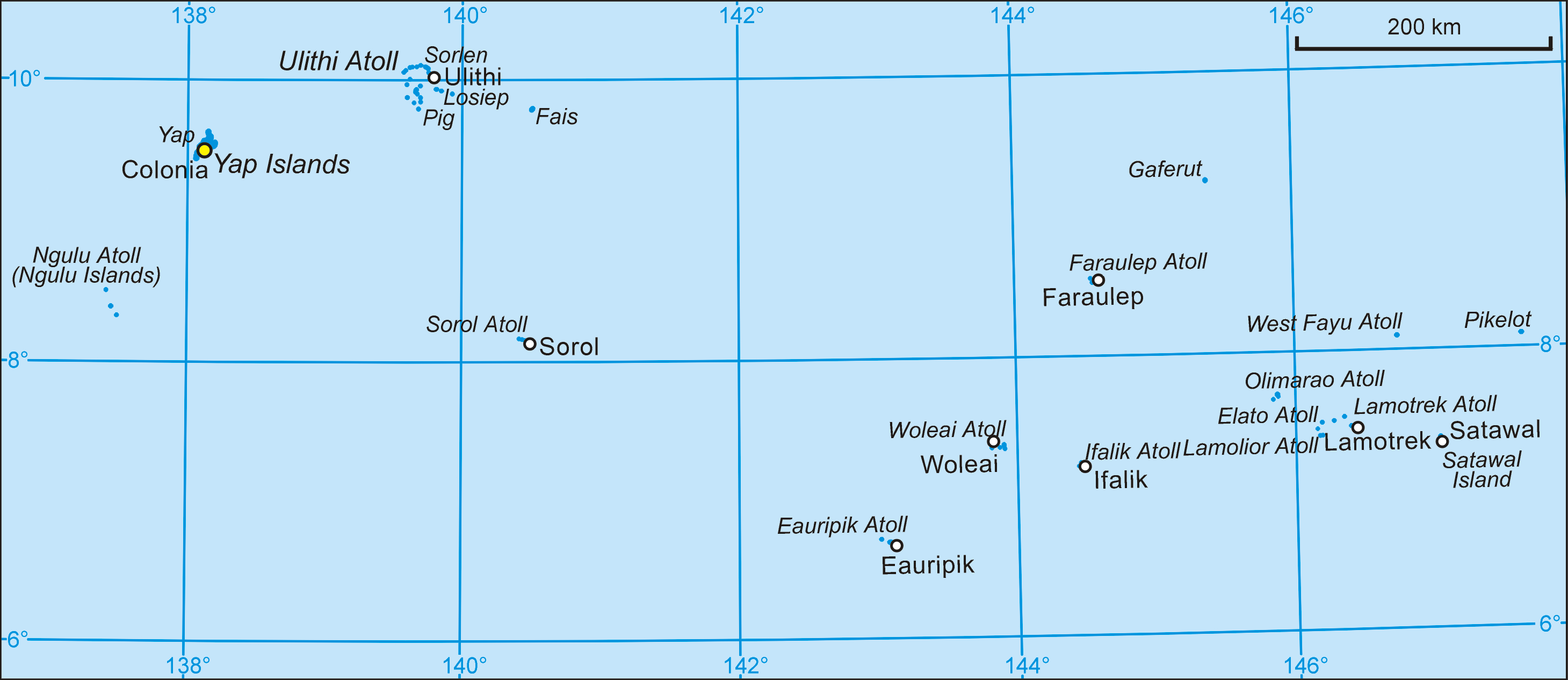

Geography
- Location: North Pacific
- Archipelago: Caroline
- Total islands: 3
- Area: 0.422 km^{2} (0.163 sq mi)
- Highest elevation: 2 m (7 ft)

Administration
- Federated States of Micronesia

Demographics
- Population: 221 (2000)
- Ethnic groups: Micronesian

Faraulep Atoll (Woleaian: Feshaiulap) is a coral atoll of three islands in the central Caroline Islands in the Pacific Ocean, and forms a legislative district in Yap State in the Federated States of Micronesia. Its total land area is only 0.422 square kilometers (0.163 sq mi), but it encloses a deep central lagoon of 7 square kilometers (2.7 sq mi) with a single opening on the southwest side. Faraulep is located approximately 100 kilometers (62 mi) southwest of Gaferut, 150 kilometers (93 mi) northeast of Woleai, and 700 kilometers (430 mi) east of Yap.

The population of Faraulep was 221 in 2000.

The first recorded sighting of Faraulep Atoll by Europeans was by a Spanish ship sailing from Manila piloted by Juan Rodríguez in 1696.

As with all of the Caroline Islands, they were sold by Spain to the Empire of Germany in 1899. The island came under the control of the Empire of Japan after World War I, and was subsequently administered under the South Seas Mandate. Following World War II, the island came under the control of the United States of America and was administered as part of the Trust Territory of the Pacific Islands from 1947, and became part of the Federated States of Micronesia from 1979.

Location of Faraulep in the Pacific Ocean
