= Lunar Saros 158 =

Eclipse cycle of the moon

Saros cycle series 158 for lunar eclipses occurs at the moon's ascending node, 18 years 11 and 1/3 days. It contains 81 events.

This lunar saros is linked to Solar Saros 165.

Cat.	Saros	Mem	Date	Time UT (hr:mn)	Type	Gamma	Magnitude	Duration (min)			Contacts UT (hr:mn)						Chart
Cat.	Saros	Mem	Date	Greatest	Type	Gamma	Magnitude	Pen.	Par.	Tot.	P1	P4	U1	U2	U3	U4	Chart
10008	158	1	2154 Oct 21	9:26:08	Penumbral	1.5560	-1.0286	56.4			8:57:56	9:54:20					
10051	158	2	2172 Oct 31	17:09:17	Penumbral	1.5197	-0.9623	95.5			16:21:32	17:57:02					
10094	158	3	2190 Nov 12	1:00:53	Penumbral	1.4894	-0.9067	117.9			0:01:56	1:59:50					
10137	158	4	2208 Nov 23	9:01:59	Penumbral	1.4659	-0.8635	132.2			7:55:53	10:08:05					
10181	158	5	2226 Dec 04	17:10:21	Penumbral	1.4479	-0.8300	141.8			15:59:27	18:21:15					
10226	158	6	2244 Dec 15	1:25:20	Penumbral	1.4340	-0.8040	148.4			0:11:08	2:39:32					
10272	158	7	2262 Dec 26	9:43:59	Penumbral	1.4226	-0.7821	153.3			8:27:20	11:00:38					
10318	158	8	2281 Jan 05	18:06:46	Penumbral	1.4136	-0.7644	156.7			16:48:25	19:25:07					
10364	158	9	2299 Jan 17	2:30:29	Penumbral	1.4048	-0.7467	159.8			1:10:35	3:50:23					
10410	158	10	2317 Jan 28	10:53:57	Penumbral	1.3953	-0.7273	163.0			9:32:27	12:15:27					
10456	158	11	2335 Feb 08	19:15:18	Penumbral	1.3834	-0.7034	166.9			17:51:51	20:38:45					
10502	158	12	2353 Feb 19	3:33:51	Penumbral	1.3686	-0.6738	171.7			2:08:00	4:59:42					
10547	158	13	2371 Mar 02	11:47:04	Penumbral	1.3489	-0.6350	178.0			10:18:04	13:16:04					
10591	158	14	2389 Mar 12	19:54:34	Penumbral	1.3239	-0.5863	185.8			18:21:40	21:27:28					
10636	158	15	2407 Mar 24	3:55:49	Penumbral	1.2931	-0.5268	194.8			2:18:25	5:33:13					
10680	158	16	2425 Apr 03	11:50:58	Penumbral	1.2568	-0.4572	204.7			10:08:37	13:33:19					
10724	158	17	2443 Apr 14	19:37:49	Penumbral	1.2128	-0.3734	215.7			17:49:58	21:25:40					
10768	158	18	2461 Apr 25	3:19:08	Penumbral	1.1634	-0.2797	227.0			1:25:38	5:12:38					
10810	158	19	2479 May 6	10:53:14	Penumbral	1.1070	-0.1732	238.7			8:53:53	12:52:35					
10851	158	20	2497 May 16	18:23:08	Penumbral	1.0463	-0.0590	249.9			16:18:11	20:28:05					
10892	158	21	2515 May 29	1:46:15	Partial	0.9791	0.0671	261.0	58.4		23:35:45	3:56:45	1:17:03			2:15:27	
10932	158	22	2533 Jun 08	9:07:46	Partial	0.9093	0.1975	271.2	98.1		6:52:10	11:23:22	8:18:43			9:56:49	
10973	158	23	2551 Jun 19	16:25:17	Partial	0.8350	0.3361	280.7	125.0		14:04:56	18:45:38	15:22:47			17:27:47	
11015	158	24	2569 Jun 29	23:42:27	Partial	0.7595	0.4767	289.1	145.4		21:17:54	2:07:00	22:29:45			0:55:09	
11055	158	25	2587 Jul 11	6:58:13	Partial	0.6818	0.6208	296.6	161.7		4:29:55	9:26:31	5:37:22			8:19:04	
11095	158	26	2605 Jul 22	14:16:22	Partial	0.6052	0.7628	302.9	174.7		11:44:55	16:47:49	12:49:01			15:43:43	
11135	158	27	2623 Aug 02	21:35:48	Partial	0.5288	0.9040	308.2	185.1		19:01:42	0:09:54	20:03:15			23:08:21	
11176	158	28	2641 Aug 13	4:58:42	Total	0.4545	1.0412	312.5	193.3	30.6	2:22:27	7:34:57	3:22:03	4:43:24	5:14:00	6:35:21	
11217	158	29	2659 Aug 24	12:25:53	Total	0.3831	1.1727	315.8	199.6	59.9	9:47:59	15:03:47	10:46:05	11:55:56	12:55:50	14:05:41	
11260	158	30	2677 Sep 03	19:58:59	Total	0.3160	1.2960	318.3	204.3	75.2	17:19:50	22:38:08	18:16:50	19:21:23	20:36:35	21:41:08	
11303	158	31	2695 Sep 15	3:38:20	Total	0.2537	1.4104	320.0	207.6	84.8	0:58:20	6:18:20	1:54:32	2:55:56	4:20:44	5:22:08	
11346	158	32	2713 Sep 26	11:24:41	Total	0.1969	1.5145	321.1	209.8	90.9	8:44:08	14:05:14	9:39:47	10:39:14	12:10:08	13:09:35	
11388	158	33	2731 Oct 07	19:19:13	Total	0.1462	1.6071	321.7	211.2	94.8	16:38:22	22:00:04	17:33:37	18:31:49	20:06:37	21:04:49	
11431	158	34	2749 Oct 18	3:21:40	Total	0.1018	1.6881	321.9	211.9	97.1	0:40:43	6:02:37	1:35:43	2:33:07	4:10:13	5:07:37	
11475	158	35	2767 Oct 29	11:31:52	Total	0.0636	1.7577	321.9	212.1	98.3	8:50:55	14:12:49	9:45:49	10:42:43	12:21:01	13:17:55	
11519	158	36	2785 Nov 08	19:50:41	Total	0.0321	1.8148	321.7	212.1	98.7	17:09:50	22:31:32	18:04:38	19:01:20	20:40:02	21:36:44	
11565	158	37	2803 Nov 20	4:17:09	Total	0.0068	1.8606	321.4	211.8	98.7	1:36:27	6:57:51	2:31:15	3:27:48	5:06:30	6:03:03	
11612	158	38	2821 Nov 30	12:51:18	Total	-0.0124	1.8499	321.1	211.5	98.5	10:10:45	15:31:51	11:05:33	12:02:03	13:40:33	14:37:03	
11659	158	39	2839 Dec 11	21:30:26	Total	-0.0278	1.8211	320.8	211.2	98.3	18:50:02	0:10:50	19:44:50	20:41:17	22:19:35	23:16:02	
11705	158	40	2857 Dec 22	6:16:07	Total	-0.0378	1.8025	320.5	210.9	98.0	3:35:52	8:56:22	4:30:40	5:27:07	7:05:07	8:01:34	
11751	158	41	2876 Jan 02	15:04:42	Total	-0.0454	1.7885	320.2	210.7	97.8	12:24:36	17:44:48	13:19:21	14:15:48	15:53:36	16:50:03	
11798	158	42	2894 Jan 12	23:56:21	Total	-0.0507	1.7789	319.9	210.5	97.6	21:16:24	2:36:18	22:11:06	23:07:33	0:45:09	1:41:36	
11843	158	43	2912 Jan 25	8:47:30	Total	-0.0564	1.7687	319.6	210.3	97.4	6:07:42	11:27:18	7:02:21	7:58:48	9:36:12	10:32:39	
11888	158	44	2930 Feb 04	17:39:03	Total	-0.0617	1.7594	319.4	210.2	97.3	14:59:21	20:18:45	15:53:57	16:50:24	18:27:42	19:24:09	
11933	158	45	2948 Feb 16	2:27:42	Total	-0.0695	1.7458	319.1	210.1	97.1	23:48:09	5:07:15	0:42:39	1:39:09	3:16:15	4:12:45	
11979	158	46	2966 Feb 26	11:12:54	Total	-0.0800	1.7275	318.8	209.9	96.8	8:33:30	13:52:18	9:27:57	10:24:30	12:01:18	12:57:51	
12024	158	47	2984 Mar 08	19:52:55	Total	-0.0948	1.7012	318.4	209.7	96.3	17:13:43	22:32:07	18:08:04	19:04:46	20:41:04	21:37:46	

== See also ==
- List of lunar eclipses
  - List of Saros series for lunar eclipses
