= Lunar Saros 159 =

Eclipse cycle of the moon

Saros cycle series 159 for lunar eclipses occurs at the moon's descending node, repeats every 18 years 11 and 1/3 days. It contains 73 events (48 listed before 3000).

Cat.	Saros	Mem	Date	Time UT (hr:mn)	Type	Gamma	Magnitude	Duration (min)			Contacts UT (hr:mn)						Chart
Cat.	Saros	Mem	Date	Greatest	Type	Gamma	Magnitude	Pen.	Par.	Tot.	P1	P4	U1	U2	U3	U4	Chart
09989	159	1	2147 Sep 09	23:11:33	Penumbral	-1.5372	-0.9380	29.6			22:56:45	23:26:21					
10033	159	2	2165 Sep 20	7:05:16	Penumbral	-1.4858	-0.8447	86.8			6:21:52	7:48:40					
10076	159	3	2183 Oct 01	15:05:25	Penumbral	-1.4396	-0.7610	115.5			14:07:40	16:03:10					
10119	159	4	2201 Oct 12	23:14:05	Penumbral	-1.4001	-0.6897	134.9			22:06:38	0:21:32					
10163	159	5	2219 Oct 24	7:29:32	Penumbral	-1.3663	-0.6288	149.2			6:14:56	8:44:08					
10208	159	6	2237 Nov 03	15:53:39	Penumbral	-1.3394	-0.5807	159.5			14:33:54	17:13:24					
10253	159	7	2255 Nov 15	0:24:34	Penumbral	-1.3181	-0.5429	167.2			23:00:58	1:48:10					
10299	159	8	2273 Nov 25	9:01:53	Penumbral	-1.3020	-0.5144	172.7			7:35:32	10:28:14					
10346	159	9	2291 Dec 06	17:45:10	Penumbral	-1.2908	-0.4951	176.6			16:16:52	19:13:28					
10392	159	10	2309 Dec 18	2:32:41	Penumbral	-1.2830	-0.4815	179.3			1:03:02	4:02:20					
10438	159	11	2327 Dec 29	11:23:32	Penumbral	-1.2784	-0.4739	180.9			9:53:05	12:53:59					
10484	159	12	2346 Jan 08	20:14:46	Penumbral	-1.2743	-0.4667	182.4			18:43:34	21:45:58					
10529	159	13	2364 Jan 20	5:07:05	Penumbral	-1.2715	-0.4618	183.4			3:35:23	6:38:47					
10574	159	14	2382 Jan 30	13:57:10	Penumbral	-1.2668	-0.4533	185.0			12:24:40	15:29:40					
10618	159	15	2400 Feb 10	22:44:27	Penumbral	-1.2606	-0.4417	187.0			21:10:57	0:17:57					
10663	159	16	2418 Feb 21	7:26:24	Penumbral	-1.2504	-0.4228	190.0			5:51:24	9:01:24					
10707	159	17	2436 Mar 03	16:03:14	Penumbral	-1.2367	-0.3972	194.0			14:26:14	17:40:14					
10751	159	18	2454 Mar 15	0:33:02	Penumbral	-1.2176	-0.3617	199.3			22:53:23	2:12:41					
10793	159	19	2472 Mar 25	8:55:10	Penumbral	-1.1927	-0.3155	205.9			7:12:13	10:38:07					
10835	159	20	2490 Apr 05	17:09:28	Penumbral	-1.1619	-0.2584	213.7			15:22:37	18:56:19					
10876	159	21	2508 Apr 17	1:15:51	Penumbral	-1.1252	-0.1907	222.4			23:24:39	3:07:03					
10916	159	22	2526 Apr 28	9:13:29	Penumbral	-1.0819	-0.1107	232.0			7:17:29	11:09:29					
10957	159	23	2544 May 8	17:03:20	Penumbral	-1.0325	-0.0198	242.2			15:02:14	19:04:26					
10999	159	24	2562 May 20	0:45:23	Partial	-0.9772	0.0816	252.6	62.7		22:39:05	2:51:41	0:14:02			1:16:44	
11040	159	25	2580 May 30	8:21:38	Partial	-0.9176	0.1908	263.0	94.7		6:10:08	10:33:08	7:34:17			9:08:59	
11080	159	26	2598 Jun 10	15:50:01	Partial	-0.8521	0.3105	273.5	119.1		13:33:16	18:06:46	14:50:28			16:49:34	
11120	159	27	2616 Jun 21	23:14:53	Partial	-0.7845	0.4340	283.3	138.6		20:53:14	1:36:32	22:05:35			0:24:11	
11159	159	28	2634 Jul 03	6:34:23	Partial	-0.7131	0.5640	292.7	155.3		4:08:02	9:00:44	5:16:44			7:52:02	
11200	159	29	2652 Jul 13	13:52:27	Partial	-0.6410	0.6951	301.3	169.3		11:21:48	16:23:06	12:27:48			15:17:06	
11242	159	30	2670 Jul 24	21:06:28	Partial	-0.5663	0.8306	309.3	181.4		18:31:49	23:41:07	19:35:46			22:37:10	
11285	159	31	2688 Aug 04	4:22:03	Partial	-0.4936	0.9620	316.3	191.4		1:43:54	7:00:12	2:46:21			5:57:45	
11328	159	32	2706 Aug 16	11:37:00	Total	-0.4214	1.0924	322.5	199.6	45.8	8:55:45	14:18:15	9:57:12	11:14:06	11:59:54	13:16:48	
11371	159	33	2724 Aug 26	18:54:49	Total	-0.3524	1.2168	327.9	206.3	67.5	16:10:52	21:38:46	17:11:40	18:21:04	19:28:34	20:37:58	
11413	159	34	2742 Sep 07	2:14:46	Total	-0.2857	1.3365	332.5	211.5	80.9	23:28:31	5:01:01	0:29:01	1:34:19	2:55:13	4:00:31	
11457	159	35	2760 Sep 17	9:40:35	Total	-0.2246	1.4459	336.3	215.5	89.5	6:52:26	12:28:44	7:52:50	8:55:50	10:25:20	11:28:20	
11501	159	36	2778 Sep 28	17:10:59	Total	-0.1682	1.5464	339.6	218.4	95.2	14:21:11	20:00:47	15:21:47	16:23:23	17:58:35	19:00:11	
11547	159	37	2796 Oct 09	0:47:09	Total	-0.1173	1.6368	342.3	220.5	98.8	21:56:00	3:38:18	22:56:54	23:57:45	1:36:33	2:37:24	
11593	159	38	2814 Oct 20	8:29:42	Total	-0.0725	1.7158	344.7	222.0	100.9	5:37:21	11:22:03	6:38:42	7:39:15	9:20:09	10:20:42	
11641	159	39	2832 Oct 30	16:19:38	Total	-0.0344	1.7828	346.7	222.9	101.9	13:26:17	19:12:59	14:28:11	15:28:41	17:10:35	18:11:05	
11687	159	40	2850 Nov 11	0:15:59	Total	-0.0023	1.8387	348.5	223.5	102.2	21:21:44	3:10:14	22:24:14	23:24:53	1:07:05	2:07:44	
11733	159	41	2868 Nov 21	8:18:53	Total	0.0238	1.7963	350.1	224.0	102.1	5:23:50	11:13:56	6:26:53	7:27:50	9:09:56	10:10:53	
11779	159	42	2886 Dec 02	16:27:49	Total	0.0441	1.7563	351.6	224.3	101.8	13:32:01	19:23:37	14:35:40	15:36:55	17:18:43	18:19:58	
11825	159	43	2904 Dec 14	0:42:23	Total	0.0592	1.7261	353.1	224.6	101.5	21:45:50	3:38:56	22:50:05	23:51:38	1:33:08	2:34:41	
11870	159	44	2922 Dec 25	8:59:41	Total	0.0713	1.7017	354.5	224.9	101.2	6:02:26	11:56:56	7:07:14	8:09:05	9:50:17	10:52:08	
11915	159	45	2941 Jan 04	17:20:48	Total	0.0797	1.6843	355.8	225.3	100.9	14:22:54	20:18:42	15:28:09	16:30:21	18:11:15	19:13:27	
11961	159	46	2959 Jan 16	1:42:19	Total	0.0872	1.6688	357.1	225.7	100.7	22:43:46	4:40:52	23:49:28	0:51:58	2:32:40	3:35:10	
12007	159	47	2977 Jan 26	10:04:13	Total	0.0936	1.6556	358.3	226.1	100.6	7:05:04	13:03:22	8:11:10	9:13:55	10:54:31	11:57:16	
12051	159	48	2995 Feb 06	18:22:27	Total	0.1025	1.6382	359.4	226.4	100.3	15:22:45	21:22:09	16:29:15	17:32:18	19:12:36	20:15:39	

== See also ==
- List of lunar eclipses
  - List of Saros series for lunar eclipses
