= Lunar Saros 148 =

Series of lunar eclipses

Member 3
August 6, 2009

Saros cycle series 148 for lunar eclipses occurs at the moon's ascending node, 18 years 11 and 1/3 days. It contains 70 events.

Cat.	Saros	Mem	Date	Time UT (hr:mn)	Type	Gamma	Magnitude	Duration (min)			Contacts UT (hr:mn)						Chart
Cat.	Saros	Mem	Date	Greatest	Type	Gamma	Magnitude	Pen.	Par.	Tot.	P1	P4	U1	U2	U3	U4	Chart
09589	148	1	1973 Jul 15	11:39:19	Penumbral	1.5177	-0.9581	99.1			10:49:46	12:28:52					
09630	148	2	1991 Jul 26	18:08:50	Penumbral	1.4369	-0.8110	152.7			16:52:29	19:25:11					
09671	148	3	2009 Aug 06	0:40:18	Penumbral	1.3572	-0.6661	189.8			23:05:24	2:15:12					
09712	148	4	2027 Aug 17	7:14:59	Penumbral	1.2797	-0.5254	218.6			5:25:41	9:04:17					
09752	148	5	2045 Aug 27	13:54:50	Penumbral	1.2060	-0.3919	241.7			11:53:59	15:55:41					
09793	148	6	2063 Sep 07	20:41:12	Penumbral	1.1374	-0.2678	260.4			18:31:00	22:51:24					
09834	148	7	2081 Sep 18	3:35:26	Penumbral	1.0747	-0.1545	275.7			1:17:35	5:53:17					
09876	148	8	2099 Sep 29	10:36:38	Penumbral	1.0174	-0.0512	288.3			8:12:29	13:00:47					
09918	148	9	2117 Oct 10	17:47:12	Partial	0.9675	0.0387	298.5	48.4		15:17:57	20:16:27	17:23:00			18:11:24	
09960	148	10	2135 Oct 22	1:06:05	Partial	0.9242	0.1164	306.6	83.1		22:32:47	3:39:23	0:24:32			1:47:38	
10004	148	11	2153 Nov 01	8:34:03	Partial	0.8881	0.1811	313.0	102.7		5:57:33	11:10:33	7:42:42			9:25:24	
10047	148	12	2171 Nov 12	16:10:02	Partial	0.8584	0.2343	318.0	115.9		13:31:02	18:49:02	15:12:05			17:07:59	
10090	148	13	2189 Nov 22	23:54:08	Partial	0.8349	0.2764	321.7	125.0		21:13:17	2:34:59	22:51:38			0:56:38	
10133	148	14	2207 Dec 05	7:45:24	Partial	0.8170	0.3084	324.3	131.4		5:03:15	10:27:33	6:39:42			8:51:06	
10177	148	15	2225 Dec 15	15:41:08	Partial	0.8026	0.3343	326.2	136.2		12:58:02	18:24:14	14:33:02			16:49:14	
10222	148	16	2243 Dec 26	23:42:17	Partial	0.7922	0.3533	327.5	139.5		20:58:32	2:26:02	22:32:32			0:52:02	
10268	148	17	2262 Jan 06	7:45:00	Partial	0.7832	0.3702	328.3	142.2		5:00:51	10:29:09	6:33:54			8:56:06	
10314	148	18	2280 Jan 17	15:49:31	Partial	0.7749	0.3860	329.0	144.8		13:05:01	18:34:01	14:37:07			17:01:55	
10361	148	19	2298 Jan 27	23:51:16	Partial	0.7640	0.4070	329.8	148.0		21:06:22	2:36:10	22:37:16			1:05:16	
10407	148	20	2316 Feb 09	7:52:24	Partial	0.7523	0.4299	330.5	151.4		5:07:09	10:37:39	6:36:42			9:08:06	
10453	148	21	2334 Feb 19	15:48:18	Partial	0.7362	0.4612	331.6	155.8		13:02:30	18:34:06	14:30:24			17:06:12	
10499	148	22	2352 Mar 01	23:39:18	Partial	0.7155	0.5013	333.1	161.1		20:52:45	2:25:51	22:18:45			0:59:51	
10544	148	23	2370 Mar 13	7:22:52	Partial	0.6883	0.5534	335.2	167.6		4:35:16	10:10:28	5:59:04			8:46:40	
10588	148	24	2388 Mar 23	15:00:16	Partial	0.6554	0.6163	337.6	174.8		12:11:28	17:49:04	13:32:52			16:27:40	
10633	148	25	2406 Apr 03	22:29:30	Partial	0.6153	0.6924	340.4	182.5		19:39:18	1:19:42	20:58:15			0:00:45	
10677	148	26	2424 Apr 14	5:51:07	Partial	0.5686	0.7810	343.5	190.6		2:59:22	8:42:52	4:15:49			7:26:25	
10721	148	27	2442 Apr 25	13:05:12	Partial	0.5147	0.8825	346.6	198.5		10:11:54	15:58:30	11:25:57			14:44:27	
10765	148	28	2460 May 5	20:13:03	Partial	0.4550	0.9949	349.6	206.0		17:18:15	23:07:51	18:30:03			21:56:03	
10807	148	29	2478 May 17	3:13:38	Total	0.3883	1.1200	352.4	212.9	54.3	0:17:26	6:09:50	1:27:11	2:46:29	3:40:47	5:00:05	
10849	148	30	2496 May 27	10:09:53	Total	0.3172	1.2530	354.6	218.7	75.2	7:12:35	13:07:11	8:20:32	9:32:17	10:47:29	11:59:14	
10890	148	31	2514 Jun 08	17:01:23	Total	0.2410	1.3951	356.2	223.3	89.1	14:03:17	19:59:29	15:09:44	16:16:50	17:45:56	18:53:02	
10930	148	32	2532 Jun 18	23:51:43	Total	0.1630	1.5405	356.9	226.5	97.9	20:53:16	2:50:10	21:58:28	23:02:46	0:40:40	1:44:58	
10971	148	33	2550 Jun 30	6:38:43	Total	0.0811	1.6929	356.8	228.2	103.0	3:40:19	9:37:07	4:44:37	5:47:13	7:30:13	8:32:49	
11013	148	34	2568 Jul 10	13:27:45	Total	-0.0002	1.8432	355.8	228.4	104.5	10:29:51	16:25:39	11:33:33	12:35:30	14:20:00	15:21:57	
11053	148	35	2586 Jul 21	20:16:47	Total	-0.0826	1.6935	353.8	226.9	102.6	17:19:53	23:13:41	18:23:20	19:25:29	21:08:05	22:10:14	
11093	148	36	2604 Aug 02	3:10:29	Total	-0.1619	1.5493	351.0	224.1	97.5	0:14:59	6:05:59	1:18:26	2:21:44	3:59:14	5:02:32	
11133	148	37	2622 Aug 13	10:06:08	Total	-0.2405	1.4063	347.3	219.8	88.7	7:12:29	12:59:47	8:16:14	9:21:47	10:50:29	11:56:02	
11174	148	38	2640 Aug 23	17:09:19	Total	-0.3138	1.2726	343.0	214.5	76.1	14:17:49	20:00:49	15:22:04	16:31:16	17:47:22	18:56:34	
11215	148	39	2658 Sep 04	0:17:32	Total	-0.3839	1.1447	338.1	208.0	57.7	21:28:29	3:06:35	22:33:32	23:48:41	0:46:23	2:01:32	
11258	148	40	2676 Sep 14	7:34:06	Total	-0.4478	1.0280	332.9	200.9	26.2	4:47:39	10:20:33	5:53:39	7:21:00	7:47:12	9:14:33	
11301	148	41	2694 Sep 25	14:58:03	Partial	-0.5063	0.9208	327.6	193.3		12:14:15	17:41:51	13:21:24			16:34:42	
11344	148	42	2712 Oct 06	22:32:13	Partial	-0.5570	0.8281	322.5	185.7		19:50:58	1:13:28	20:59:22			0:05:04	
11386	148	43	2730 Oct 18	6:15:28	Partial	-0.6012	0.7471	317.5	178.3		3:36:43	8:54:13	4:46:19			7:44:37	
11429	148	44	2748 Oct 28	14:07:40	Partial	-0.6389	0.6781	312.9	171.3		11:31:13	16:44:07	12:42:01			15:33:19	
11473	148	45	2766 Nov 08	22:09:29	Partial	-0.6694	0.6222	308.9	165.1		19:35:02	0:43:56	20:46:56			23:32:02	
11517	148	46	2784 Nov 19	6:20:13	Partial	-0.6931	0.5788	305.4	159.9		3:47:31	8:52:55	5:00:16			7:40:10	
11563	148	47	2802 Nov 30	14:39:15	Partial	-0.7109	0.5464	302.5	155.7		12:08:00	17:10:30	13:21:24			15:57:06	
11610	148	48	2820 Dec 10	23:05:01	Partial	-0.7238	0.5232	300.1	152.5		20:34:58	1:35:04	21:48:46			0:21:16	
11657	148	49	2838 Dec 22	7:37:16	Partial	-0.7322	0.5082	298.2	150.3		5:08:10	10:06:22	6:22:07			8:52:25	
11703	148	50	2857 Jan 01	16:14:14	Partial	-0.7373	0.4998	296.6	148.8		13:45:56	18:42:32	14:59:50			17:28:38	
11749	148	51	2875 Jan 13	0:53:41	Partial	-0.7410	0.4941	295.2	147.7		22:26:05	3:21:17	23:39:50			2:07:32	
11796	148	52	2893 Jan 23	9:34:59	Partial	-0.7436	0.4906	293.9	146.9		7:08:02	12:01:56	8:21:32			10:48:26	
11841	148	53	2911 Feb 04	18:15:58	Partial	-0.7469	0.4860	292.5	146.0		15:49:43	20:42:13	17:02:58			19:28:58	
11886	148	54	2929 Feb 15	2:55:11	Partial	-0.7522	0.4781	290.8	144.6		0:29:47	5:20:35	1:42:53			4:07:29	
11931	148	55	2947 Feb 26	11:30:31	Partial	-0.7613	0.4634	288.6	142.4		9:06:13	13:54:49	10:19:19			12:41:43	
11977	148	56	2965 Mar 08	20:02:09	Partial	-0.7738	0.4427	286.0	139.3		17:39:09	22:25:09	18:52:30			21:11:48	
12022	148	57	2983 Mar 20	4:28:31	Partial	-0.7910	0.4134	282.7	134.9		2:07:10	6:49:52	3:21:04			5:35:58	

== See also ==
- List of lunar eclipses
  - List of Saros series for lunar eclipses
