= Lunar Saros 107 =

Eclipse cycle of the moon

Saros cycle series 107 for lunar eclipses occurred at the moon's descending node, 18 years 11 and 1/3 days. It contained 72 events.

Cat.	Saros	Mem	Date	Time UT (hr:mn)	Type	Gamma	Magnitude	Duration (min)			Contacts UT (hr:mn)						Chart
Cat.	Saros	Mem	Date	Greatest	Type	Gamma	Magnitude	Pen.	Par.	Tot.	P1	P4	U1	U2	U3	U4	Chart
06282	107	1	606 Jun 26	0:11:01	Penumbral	-1.5278	-0.9169	42.6			23:49:43	0:32:19					
06329	107	2	624 Jul 06	7:40:28	Penumbral	-1.4581	-0.7893	103.2			6:48:52	8:32:04					
06375	107	3	642 Jul 17	15:12:29	Penumbral	-1.3904	-0.6653	137.3			14:03:50	16:21:08					
06420	107	4	660 Jul 27	22:50:41	Penumbral	-1.3273	-0.5504	161.7			21:29:50	0:11:32					
06465	107	5	678 Aug 08	6:33:10	Penumbral	-1.2677	-0.4419	181.0			5:02:40	8:03:40					
06511	107	6	696 Aug 18	14:23:54	Penumbral	-1.2148	-0.3461	196.0			12:45:54	16:01:54					
06555	107	7	714 Aug 29	22:20:25	Penumbral	-1.1668	-0.2594	208.3			20:36:16	0:04:34					
06598	107	8	732 Sep 09	6:25:00	Penumbral	-1.1257	-0.1855	218.1			4:35:57	8:14:03					
06643	107	9	750 Sep 20	14:36:38	Penumbral	-1.0904	-0.1224	226.0			12:43:38	16:29:38					
06687	107	10	768 Sep 30	22:57:01	Penumbral	-1.0625	-0.0728	232.0			21:01:01	0:53:01					
06729	107	11	786 Oct 12	7:24:09	Penumbral	-1.0406	-0.0343	236.7			5:25:48	9:22:30					
06771	107	12	804 Oct 22	15:58:05	Penumbral	-1.0245	-0.0063	240.1			13:58:02	17:58:08					
06812	107	13	822 Nov 03	0:38:02	Partial	-1.0137	0.0120	242.6	23.9		22:36:44	2:39:20	0:26:05			0:49:59	
06853	107	14	840 Nov 13	9:23:17	Partial	-1.0074	0.0224	244.2	32.6		7:21:11	11:25:23	9:06:59			9:39:35	
06893	107	15	858 Nov 24	18:11:30	Partial	-1.0038	0.0277	245.4	36.3		16:08:48	20:14:12	17:53:21			18:29:39	
06934	107	16	876 Dec 05	3:02:18	Partial	-1.0027	0.0290	246.1	37.1		0:59:15	5:05:21	2:43:45			3:20:51	
06976	107	17	894 Dec 16	11:53:12	Partial	-1.0018	0.0298	246.7	37.7		9:49:51	13:56:33	11:34:21			12:12:03	
07017	107	18	912 Dec 26	20:43:53	Partial	-1.0012	0.0305	247.3	38.2		18:40:14	22:47:32	20:24:47			21:02:59	
07057	107	19	931 Jan 07	5:30:34	Partial	-0.9976	0.0368	248.4	42.0		3:26:22	7:34:46	5:09:34			5:51:34	
07098	107	20	949 Jan 17	14:14:23	Partial	-0.9921	0.0470	249.8	47.5		12:09:29	16:19:17	13:50:38			14:38:08	
07139	107	21	967 Jan 28	22:51:32	Partial	-0.9814	0.0666	252.1	56.5		20:45:29	0:57:35	22:23:17			23:19:47	
07180	107	22	985 Feb 08	7:22:35	Partial	-0.9665	0.0943	255.1	67.1		5:15:02	9:30:08	6:49:02			7:56:08	
07224	107	23	1003 Feb 19	15:44:36	Partial	-0.9446	0.1347	259.2	79.9		13:35:00	17:54:12	15:04:39			16:24:33	
07268	107	24	1021 Mar 01	23:59:24	Partial	-0.9175	0.1848	264.0	93.1		21:47:24	2:11:24	23:12:51			0:45:57	
07312	107	25	1039 Mar 13	8:04:49	Partial	-0.8831	0.2482	269.8	107.2		5:49:55	10:19:43	7:11:13			8:58:25	
07357	107	26	1057 Mar 23	16:01:00	Partial	-0.8419	0.3240	276.2	121.5		13:42:54	18:19:06	15:00:15			17:01:45	
07401	107	27	1075 Apr 03	23:48:09	Partial	-0.7940	0.4119	283.3	135.6		21:26:30	2:09:48	22:40:21			0:55:57	
07446	107	28	1093 Apr 14	7:26:59	Partial	-0.7400	0.5109	290.7	149.2		5:01:38	9:52:20	6:12:23			8:41:35	
07492	107	29	1111 Apr 25	14:58:17	Partial	-0.6802	0.6202	298.2	162		12:29:11	17:27:23	13:37:17			16:19:17	
07538	107	30	1129 May 5	22:21:39	Partial	-0.6146	0.7401	305.7	174.1		19:48:48	0:54:30	20:54:36			23:48:42	
07584	107	31	1147 May 17	5:39:50	Partial	-0.5454	0.8664	312.8	184.9		3:03:26	8:16:14	4:07:23			7:12:17	
07632	107	32	1165 May 27	12:52:52	Partial	-0.4727	0.9986	319.5	194.5		10:13:07	15:32:37	11:15:37			14:30:07	
07679	107	33	1183 Jun 7	20:01:59	Total	-0.3976	1.1352	325.6	202.7	54.8	17:19:11	22:44:47	18:20:38	19:34:35	20:29:23	21:43:20	
07725	107	34	1201 Jun 18	3:08:28	Total	-0.3208	1.2744	331.0	209.6	74.8	0:22:58	5:53:58	1:23:40	2:31:04	3:45:52	4:53:16	
07771	107	35	1219 Jun 29	10:13:47	Total	-0.2440	1.4133	335.6	215.1	87.6	7:25:59	13:01:35	8:26:14	9:29:59	10:57:35	12:01:20	
07817	107	36	1237 Jul 09	17:19:45	Total	-0.1686	1.5495	339.4	219.1	95.8	14:30:03	20:09:27	15:30:12	16:31:51	18:07:39	19:09:18	
07862	107	37	1255 Jul 21	0:25:59	Total	-0.0945	1.6831	342.5	221.8	100.7	21:34:44	3:17:14	22:35:05	23:35:38	1:16:20	2:16:53	
07906	107	38	1273 Jul 31	7:35:52	Total	-0.0244	1.8090	344.8	223.3	102.8	4:43:28	10:28:16	5:44:13	6:44:28	8:27:16	9:27:31	
07951	107	39	1291 Aug 11	14:49:05	Total	0.0418	1.7741	346.5	223.8	102.6	11:55:50	17:42:20	12:57:11	13:57:47	15:40:23	16:40:59	
07996	107	40	1309 Aug 21	22:08:01	Total	0.1025	1.6598	347.7	223.4	100.5	19:14:10	1:01:52	20:16:19	21:17:46	22:58:16	23:59:43	
08039	107	41	1327 Sep 02	5:31:42	Total	0.1582	1.5545	348.5	222.3	96.8	2:37:27	8:25:57	3:40:33	4:43:18	6:20:06	7:22:51	
08080	107	42	1345 Sep 12	13:02:48	Total	0.2067	1.4623	349.0	220.8	92.0	10:08:18	15:57:18	11:12:24	12:16:48	13:48:48	14:53:12	
08122	107	43	1363 Sep 23	20:40:23	Total	0.2489	1.3816	349.4	219.0	86.5	17:45:41	23:35:05	18:50:53	19:57:08	21:23:38	22:29:53	
08163	107	44	1381 Oct 04	4:24:45	Total	0.2847	1.3129	349.8	217.2	80.5	1:29:51	7:19:39	2:36:09	3:44:30	5:05:00	6:13:21	
08204	107	45	1399 Oct 15	12:16:35	Total	0.3135	1.2570	350.3	215.6	74.5	9:21:26	15:11:44	10:28:47	11:39:20	12:53:50	14:04:23	
08246	107	46	1417 Oct 25	20:15:07	Total	0.3364	1.2122	350.8	214.2	68.9	17:19:43	23:10:31	18:28:01	19:40:40	20:49:34	22:02:13	
08288	107	47	1435 Nov 06	4:20:16	Total	0.3529	1.1792	351.5	213.2	64.2	1:24:31	7:16:01	2:33:40	3:48:10	4:52:22	6:06:52	
08329	107	48	1453 Nov 16	12:28:47	Total	0.3661	1.1526	352.3	212.5	59.9	9:32:38	15:24:56	10:42:32	11:58:50	12:58:44	14:15:02	
08370	107	49	1471 Nov 27	20:42:22	Total	0.3745	1.1352	353.2	212.1	56.8	17:45:46	23:38:58	18:56:19	20:13:58	21:10:46	22:28:25	
08409	107	50	1489 Dec 08	4:57:05	Total	0.3817	1.1202	354.1	211.8	53.9	2:00:02	7:54:08	3:11:11	4:30:08	5:24:02	6:42:59	
08449	107	51	1507 Dec 19	13:13:01	Total	0.3872	1.1089	354.9	211.7	51.6	10:15:34	16:10:28	11:27:10	12:47:13	13:38:49	14:58:52	
08490	107	52	1525 Dec 29	21:26:19	Total	0.3944	1.0947	355.6	211.4	48.4	18:28:31	0:24:07	19:40:37	21:02:07	21:50:31	23:12:01	
08531	107	53	1544 Jan 10	5:37:51	Total	0.4024	1.0793	356.0	211.0	44.6	2:39:51	8:35:51	3:52:21	5:15:33	6:00:09	7:23:21	
08574	107	54	1562 Jan 20	13:43:40	Total	0.4147	1.0565	356.1	210.1	38.0	10:45:37	16:41:43	11:58:37	13:24:40	14:02:40	15:28:43	
08617	107	55	1580 Jan 31	21:43:39	Total	0.4311	1.0264	355.8	208.7	26.3	18:45:45	0:41:33	19:59:18	21:30:30	21:56:48	23:28:00	
08661	107	56	1598 Feb 21	5:35:27	Partial	0.4537	0.9851	355.0	206.5		2:37:57	8:32:57	3:52:12			7:18:42	
08706	107	57	1616 Mar 03	13:19:28	Partial	0.4820	0.9335	353.5	203.4		10:22:43	16:16:13	11:37:46			15:01:10	
08750	107	58	1634 Mar 14	20:53:01	Partial	0.5184	0.8674	351.1	198.8		17:57:28	23:48:34	19:13:37			22:32:25	
08794	107	59	1652 Mar 25	4:17:30	Partial	0.5617	0.7887	347.9	192.6		1:23:33	7:11:27	2:41:12			5:53:48	
08839	107	60	1670 Apr 05	11:31:33	Partial	0.6128	0.6956	343.4	184.1		8:39:51	14:23:15	9:59:30			13:03:36	
08885	107	61	1688 Apr 15	18:37:21	Partial	0.6703	0.5908	337.7	173.0		15:48:30	21:26:12	17:10:51			20:03:51	
08931	107	62	1706 Apr 28	1:31:45	Partial	0.7365	0.4702	330.2	157.6		22:46:39	4:16:51	0:12:57			2:50:33	
08978	107	63	1724 May 8	8:19:43	Partial	0.8072	0.3411	321.0	137.1		5:39:13	11:00:13	7:11:10			9:28:16	
09024	107	64	1742 May 19	14:58:37	Partial	0.8845	0.1998	309.6	107.2		12:23:49	17:33:25	14:05:01			15:52:13	
09071	107	65	1760 May 29	21:33:40	Partial	0.9647	0.0532	296.0	56.6		19:05:40	0:01:40	21:05:22			22:01:58	
09117	107	66	1778 Jun 10	4:01:09	Penumbral	1.0501	-0.1034	279.3			1:41:30	6:20:48					
09162	107	67	1796 Jun 20	10:28:08	Penumbral	1.1354	-0.2597	259.9			8:18:11	12:38:05					
09207	107	68	1814 Jul 02	16:51:30	Penumbral	1.2225	-0.4196	236.7			14:53:09	18:49:51					
09252	107	69	1832 Jul 12	23:15:58	Penumbral	1.3081	-0.5769	209.3			21:31:19	1:00:37					
09299	107	70	1850 Jul 24	5:40:16	Penumbral	1.3933	-0.7337	175.7			4:12:25	7:08:07					
09343	107	71	1868 Aug 03	12:09:13	Penumbral	1.4740	-0.8825	133.5			11:02:28	13:15:58					
09386	107	72	1886 Aug 14	18:42:04	Penumbral	1.5511	-1.0246	68.6			18:07:46	19:16:22					

== See also ==
- List of lunar eclipses
  - List of Saros series for lunar eclipses
