= Lunar Saros 162 =

Series of lunar eclipses

Saros cycle series 162 for lunar eclipses occurs at the moon's ascending node, 18 years 11 and 1/3 days. It contains 71 events.

Cat.	Saros	Mem	Date	Time UT (hr:mn)	Type	Gamma	Magnitude	Duration (min)			Contacts UT (hr:mn)						Chart
Cat.	Saros	Mem	Date	Greatest	Type	Gamma	Magnitude	Pen.	Par.	Tot.	P1	P4	U1	U2	U3	U4	Chart
10337	162	1	2288 Aug 12	20:15:31	Penumbral	1.4946	-0.8572	78.4			19:36:19	20:54:43					
10384	162	2	2306 Aug 25	3:53:23	Penumbral	1.4297	-0.7385	119.3			2:53:44	4:53:02					
10430	162	3	2324 Sep 04	11:36:05	Penumbral	1.3683	-0.6266	146.8			10:22:41	12:49:29					
10476	162	4	2342 Sep 15	19:24:22	Penumbral	1.3113	-0.5229	167.6			18:00:34	20:48:10					
10521	162	5	2360 Sep 26	3:19:54	Penumbral	1.2602	-0.4303	183.7			1:48:03	4:51:45					
10566	162	6	2378 Oct 07	11:22:21	Penumbral	1.2148	-0.3484	196.5			9:44:06	13:00:36					
10610	162	7	2396 Oct 17	19:32:43	Penumbral	1.1760	-0.2786	206.6			17:49:25	21:16:01					
10655	162	8	2414 Oct 29	3:49:51	Penumbral	1.1430	-0.2195	214.7			2:02:30	5:37:12					
10699	162	9	2432 Nov 08	12:15:14	Penumbral	1.1169	-0.1730	220.8			10:24:50	14:05:38					
10743	162	10	2450 Nov 19	20:46:40	Penumbral	1.0959	-0.1360	225.6			18:53:52	22:39:28					
10785	162	11	2468 Nov 30	5:24:27	Penumbral	1.0806	-0.1092	229.2			3:29:51	7:19:03					
10827	162	12	2486 Dec 11	14:07:10	Penumbral	1.0694	-0.0900	231.8			12:11:16	16:03:04					
10868	162	13	2504 Dec 22	22:54:41	Penumbral	1.0627	-0.0787	233.5			20:57:56	0:51:26					
10909	162	14	2523 Jan 03	7:44:09	Penumbral	1.0579	-0.0706	234.9			5:46:42	9:41:36					
10949	162	15	2541 Jan 13	16:35:03	Penumbral	1.0544	-0.0649	235.9			14:37:06	18:33:00					
10991	162	16	2559 Jan 25	1:25:29	Penumbral	1.0511	-0.0592	236.9			23:27:02	3:23:56					
11032	162	17	2577 Feb 04	10:14:49	Penumbral	1.0475	-0.0529	238.0			8:15:49	12:13:49					
11072	162	18	2595 Feb 15	18:59:22	Penumbral	1.0403	-0.0397	239.7			16:59:31	20:59:13					
11112	162	19	2613 Feb 27	3:40:03	Penumbral	1.0305	-0.0216	241.9			1:39:06	5:41:00					
11152	162	20	2631 Mar 10	12:13:33	Partial	1.0154	0.0065	245.0	17.7		10:11:03	14:16:03	12:04:42			12:22:24	
11193	162	21	2649 Mar 20	20:41:39	Partial	0.9964	0.0415	248.8	44.7		18:37:15	22:46:03	20:19:18			21:04:00	
11235	162	22	2667 Apr 01	4:59:45	Partial	0.9700	0.0903	253.8	65.7		2:52:51	7:06:39	4:26:54			5:32:36	
11278	162	23	2685 Apr 11	13:11:29	Partial	0.9389	0.1478	259.4	83.5		11:01:47	15:21:11	12:29:44			13:53:14	
11320	162	24	2703 Apr 23	21:12:57	Partial	0.8998	0.2199	266.0	101.0		18:59:57	23:25:57	20:22:27			22:03:27	
11363	162	25	2721 May 4	5:07:36	Partial	0.8558	0.3008	272.9	117.1		2:51:09	7:24:03	4:09:03			6:06:09	
11405	162	26	2739 May 15	12:52:11	Partial	0.8039	0.3960	280.6	132.8		10:31:53	15:12:29	11:45:47			13:58:35	
11448	162	27	2757 May 25	20:31:07	Partial	0.7479	0.4986	288.3	147.1		18:06:58	22:55:16	19:17:34			21:44:40	
11492	162	28	2775 Jun 06	4:01:54	Partial	0.6856	0.6126	296.1	160.6		1:33:51	6:29:57	2:41:36			5:22:12	
11538	162	29	2793 Jun 16	11:27:20	Partial	0.6193	0.7336	303.6	172.9		8:55:32	13:59:08	10:00:53			12:53:47	
11584	162	30	2811 Jun 27	18:46:47	Partial	0.5485	0.8626	310.9	183.9		16:11:20	21:22:14	17:14:50			20:18:44	
11632	162	31	2829 Jul 08	2:03:07	Partial	0.4755	0.9954	317.6	193.5		23:24:19	4:41:55	0:26:22			3:39:52	
11679	162	32	2847 Jul 19	9:16:19	Total	0.4007	1.1312	323.6	201.7	53.9	6:34:31	11:58:07	7:35:28	8:49:22	9:43:16	10:57:10	
11725	162	33	2865 Jul 29	16:27:39	Total	0.3250	1.2685	329.0	208.5	73.9	13:43:09	19:12:09	14:43:24	15:50:42	17:04:36	18:11:54	
11771	162	34	2883 Aug 09	23:39:02	Total	0.2499	1.4042	333.5	213.9	86.6	20:52:17	2:25:47	21:52:05	22:55:44	0:22:20	1:25:59	
11817	162	35	2901 Aug 21	6:51:31	Total	0.1763	1.5371	337.3	217.9	94.8	4:02:52	9:40:10	5:02:34	6:04:07	7:38:55	8:40:28	
11862	162	36	2919 Sep 01	14:05:41	Total	0.1051	1.6652	340.4	220.6	99.8	11:15:29	16:55:53	12:15:23	13:15:47	14:55:35	15:55:59	
11907	162	37	2937 Sep 11	21:23:18	Total	0.0376	1.7865	342.7	222.2	102.2	18:31:57	0:14:39	19:32:12	20:32:12	22:14:24	23:14:24	
11952	162	38	2955 Sep 23	4:45:05	Total	-0.0255	1.8058	344.5	222.9	102.4	1:52:50	7:37:20	2:53:38	3:53:53	5:36:17	6:36:32	
11998	162	39	2973 Oct 03	12:12:54	Total	-0.0829	1.6974	345.8	222.7	101.0	9:20:00	15:05:48	10:21:33	11:22:24	13:03:24	14:04:15	
12042	162	40	2991 Oct 14	19:45:08	Total	-0.1358	1.5973	346.8	221.9	98.1	16:51:44	22:38:32	17:54:11	18:56:05	20:34:11	21:36:05	

== See also ==
- List of lunar eclipses
  - List of Saros series for lunar eclipses
