= Lunar Saros 106 =

Series of lunar eclipses

Saros cycle series 106 for lunar eclipses occurred at the moon's ascending node, 18 years 11 and 1/3 days. It contained 73 events.

Cat.	Saros	Mem	Date	Time UT (hr:mn)	Type	Gamma	Magnitude	Duration (min)			Contacts UT (hr:mn)						Chart
Cat.	Saros	Mem	Date	Greatest	Type	Gamma	Magnitude	Pen.	Par.	Tot.	P1	P4	U1	U2	U3	U4	Chart
06253	106	1	595 Jul 27	1:33:13	Penumbral	1.5221	-0.9596	90.2			0:48:07	2:18:19					
06301	106	2	613 Aug 06	8:29:10	Penumbral	1.4514	-0.8298	138.8			7:19:46	9:38:34					
06347	106	3	631 Aug 17	15:33:22	Penumbral	1.3860	-0.7097	170.3			14:08:13	16:58:31					
06393	106	4	649 Aug 27	22:47:19	Penumbral	1.3270	-0.6015	193.0			21:10:49	0:23:49					
06438	106	5	667 Sep 08	6:11:10	Penumbral	1.2749	-0.5061	210.1			4:26:07	7:56:13					
06483	106	6	685 Sep 18	13:46:00	Penumbral	1.2307	-0.4250	222.9			11:54:33	15:37:27					
06528	106	7	703 Sep 29	21:30:42	Penumbral	1.1934	-0.3566	232.5			19:34:27	23:26:57					
06572	106	8	721 Oct 10	5:25:14	Penumbral	1.1632	-0.3012	239.6			3:25:26	7:25:02					
06616	106	9	739 Oct 21	13:28:49	Penumbral	1.1394	-0.2574	244.6			11:26:31	15:31:07					
06660	106	10	757 Oct 31	21:41:14	Penumbral	1.1221	-0.2253	247.9			19:37:17	23:45:11					
06704	106	11	775 Nov 12	5:59:14	Penumbral	1.1088	-0.2002	250.0			3:54:14	8:04:14					
06746	106	12	793 Nov 22	14:23:41	Penumbral	1.1000	-0.1832	251.0			12:18:11	16:29:11					
06788	106	13	811 Dec 03	22:51:00	Penumbral	1.0931	-0.1694	251.5			20:45:15	0:56:45					
06828	106	14	829 Dec 14	7:21:21	Penumbral	1.0879	-0.1583	251.5			5:15:36	9:27:06					
06868	106	15	847 Dec 25	15:50:18	Penumbral	1.0809	-0.1436	251.9			13:44:21	17:56:15					
06909	106	16	866 Jan 05	0:19:44	Penumbral	1.0736	-0.1283	252.1			22:13:41	2:25:47					
06950	106	17	884 Jan 16	8:45:25	Penumbral	1.0630	-0.1064	253.0			6:38:55	10:51:55					
06992	106	18	902 Jan 26	17:07:20	Penumbral	1.0483	-0.0769	254.6			15:00:02	19:14:38					
07033	106	19	920 Feb 07	1:22:57	Penumbral	1.0279	-0.0366	257.2			23:14:21	3:31:33					
07074	106	20	938 Feb 17	9:33:20	Partial	1.0023	0.0133	260.6	26.3		7:23:02	11:43:38	9:20:11			9:46:29	
07115	106	21	956 Feb 28	17:36:42	Partial	0.9704	0.0748	264.8	61.7		15:24:18	19:49:06	17:05:51			18:07:33	
07156	106	22	974 Mar 11	1:32:38	Partial	0.9317	0.1489	269.7	85.9		23:17:47	3:47:29	0:49:41			2:15:35	
07197	106	23	992 Mar 21	9:21:55	Partial	0.8867	0.2344	275.3	106.2		7:04:16	11:39:34	8:28:49			10:15:01	
07241	106	24	1010 Apr 01	17:04:25	Partial	0.8352	0.3319	281.2	124.2		14:43:49	19:25:01	16:02:19			18:06:31	
07286	106	25	1028 Apr 12	0:40:17	Partial	0.7775	0.4405	287.3	140.4		22:16:38	3:03:56	23:30:05			1:50:29	
07330	106	26	1046 Apr 23	8:10:38	Partial	0.7145	0.5587	293.3	154.8		5:43:59	10:37:17	6:53:14			9:28:02	
07374	106	27	1064 May 3	15:36:35	Partial	0.6470	0.6850	298.9	167.5		13:07:08	18:06:02	14:12:50			17:00:20	
07418	106	28	1082 May 14	22:59:40	Partial	0.5763	0.8169	304.1	178.5		20:27:37	1:31:43	21:30:25			0:28:55	
07464	106	29	1100 May 25	6:19:17	Partial	0.5017	0.9556	308.8	188.0		3:44:53	8:53:41	4:45:17			7:53:17	
07510	106	30	1118 Jun 5	13:39:05	Total	0.4266	1.095	312.7	195.7	45.5	11:02:44	16:15:26	12:01:14	13:16:20	14:01:50	15:16:56	
07556	106	31	1136 Jun 15	20:58:24	Total	0.35	1.2368	315.8	201.9	68.6	18:20:30	23:36:18	19:17:27	20:24:06	21:32:42	22:39:21	
07603	106	32	1154 Jun 27	4:20:08	Total	0.275	1.3754	318.1	206.5	82.2	1:41:05	6:59:11	2:36:53	3:39:02	5:01:14	6:03:23	
07651	106	33	1172 Jul 7	11:43:06	Total	0.2002	1.5132	319.8	209.8	91.1	9:03:12	14:23:00	9:58:12	10:57:33	12:28:39	13:28:00	
07697	106	34	1190 Jul 18	19:11:31	Total	0.1293	1.6436	320.6	211.8	96.3	16:31:13	21:51:49	17:25:37	18:23:22	19:59:40	20:57:25	
07743	106	35	1208 Jul 29	2:44:05	Total	0.0611	1.7688	320.9	212.8	99.0	0:03:38	5:24:32	0:57:41	1:54:35	3:33:35	4:30:29	
07789	106	36	1226 Aug 09	10:22:59	Total	-0.0021	1.8770	320.6	212.8	99.6	7:42:41	13:03:17	8:36:35	9:33:11	11:12:47	12:09:23	
07834	106	37	1244 Aug 19	18:08:09	Total	-0.0604	1.7694	320.0	212.0	98.7	15:28:09	20:48:09	16:22:09	17:18:48	18:57:30	19:54:09	
07879	106	38	1262 Aug 31	2:01:40	Total	-0.1120	1.6741	319.1	210.8	96.5	23:22:07	4:41:13	0:16:16	1:13:25	2:49:55	3:47:04	
07924	106	39	1280 Sep 10	10:02:47	Total	-0.1577	1.5895	318.0	209.2	93.5	7:23:47	12:41:47	8:18:11	9:16:02	10:49:32	11:47:23	
07969	106	40	1298 Sep 21	18:11:08	Total	-0.1975	1.5155	316.9	207.5	90.0	15:32:41	20:49:35	16:27:23	17:26:08	18:56:08	19:54:53	
08013	106	41	1316 Oct 02	2:28:20	Total	-0.2301	1.4547	315.8	205.8	86.5	23:50:26	5:06:14	0:45:26	1:45:05	3:11:35	4:11:14	
08056	106	42	1334 Oct 13	10:52:55	Total	-0.2565	1.4053	314.9	204.2	83.1	8:15:28	13:30:22	9:10:49	10:11:22	11:34:28	12:35:01	
08098	106	43	1352 Oct 23	19:25:34	Total	-0.2765	1.3677	314.2	202.9	80.2	16:48:28	22:02:40	17:44:07	18:45:28	20:05:40	21:07:01	
08139	106	44	1370 Nov 04	4:03:32	Total	-0.2920	1.3383	313.6	201.8	77.6	1:26:44	6:40:20	2:22:38	3:24:44	4:42:20	5:44:26	
08180	106	45	1388 Nov 14	12:48:27	Total	-0.3020	1.3193	313.2	201.1	75.9	10:11:51	15:25:03	11:07:54	12:10:30	13:26:24	14:29:00	
08221	106	46	1406 Nov 25	21:36:51	Total	-0.3091	1.3057	313.0	200.6	74.6	19:00:21	0:13:21	19:56:33	20:59:33	22:14:09	23:17:09	
08262	106	47	1424 Dec 06	6:28:42	Total	-0.3134	1.2975	312.9	200.3	73.7	3:52:15	9:05:09	4:48:33	5:51:51	7:05:33	8:08:51	
08304	106	48	1442 Dec 17	15:21:21	Total	-0.3170	1.2906	312.8	200.0	73.1	12:44:57	17:57:45	13:41:21	14:44:48	15:57:54	17:01:21	
08345	106	49	1460 Dec 28	0:14:45	Total	-0.3200	1.2851	312.7	199.9	72.5	21:38:24	2:51:06	22:34:48	23:38:30	0:51:00	1:54:42	
08385	106	50	1479 Jan 08	9:05:26	Total	-0.3253	1.2757	312.6	199.6	71.6	6:29:08	11:41:44	7:25:38	8:29:38	9:41:14	10:45:14	
08425	106	51	1497 Jan 18	17:53:14	Total	-0.3330	1.2619	312.3	199.2	70.2	15:17:05	20:29:23	16:13:38	17:18:08	18:28:20	19:32:50	
08465	106	52	1515 Jan 30	2:35:56	Total	-0.3447	1.2410	311.9	198.5	67.8	23:59:59	5:11:53	0:56:41	2:02:02	3:09:50	4:15:11	
08506	106	53	1533 Feb 09	11:13:52	Total	-0.3602	1.2134	311.2	197.6	64.5	8:38:16	13:49:28	9:35:04	10:41:37	11:46:07	12:52:40	
08548	106	54	1551 Feb 20	19:43:12	Total	-0.3827	1.1729	310.3	196.0	58.9	17:08:03	22:18:21	18:05:12	19:13:45	20:12:39	21:21:12	
08592	106	55	1569 Mar 03	4:06:08	Total	-0.4104	1.1228	308.9	193.9	50.5	1:31:41	6:40:35	2:29:11	3:40:53	4:31:23	5:43:05	
08635	106	56	1587 Mar 24	12:19:48	Total	-0.4456	1.0591	307.1	190.8	35.7	9:46:15	14:53:21	10:44:24	12:01:57	12:37:39	13:55:12	
08678	106	57	1605 Apr 03	20:27:02	Partial	-0.4858	0.9861	304.8	186.9		17:54:38	22:59:26	18:53:35			22:00:29	
08723	106	58	1623 Apr 15	4:23:33	Partial	-0.5345	0.8972	301.6	181.4		1:52:45	6:54:21	2:52:51			5:54:15	
08767	106	59	1641 Apr 25	12:14:36	Partial	-0.5876	0.8003	297.8	174.6		9:45:42	14:43:30	10:47:18			13:41:54	
08812	106	60	1659 May 6	19:56:13	Partial	-0.6484	0.6890	292.8	165.3		17:29:49	22:22:37	18:33:34			21:18:52	
08857	106	61	1677 May 17	3:32:58	Partial	-0.7127	0.5710	286.8	153.7		1:09:34	5:56:22	2:16:07			4:49:49	
08903	106	62	1695 May 28	11:01:57	Partial	-0.7830	0.4417	279.3	138.2		8:42:18	13:21:36	9:52:51			12:11:03	
08949	106	63	1713 Jun 08	18:28:15	Partial	-0.8551	0.3089	270.6	118.1		16:12:57	20:43:33	17:29:12			19:27:18	
08996	106	64	1731 Jun 20	1:49:42	Partial	-0.9307	0.1692	260.2	89.4		23:39:36	3:59:48	1:05:00			2:34:24	
09042	106	65	1749 Jun 30	9:09:16	Partial	-1.0073	0.0276	248.2	36.9		7:05:10	11:13:22	8:50:49			9:27:43	
09089	106	66	1767 Jul 11	16:27:13	Penumbral	-1.0845	-0.1155	234.2			14:30:07	18:24:19					
09134	106	67	1785 Jul 21	23:45:46	Penumbral	-1.1605	-0.2568	218.2			21:56:40	1:34:52					
09179	106	68	1803 Aug 03	7:05:09	Penumbral	-1.2349	-0.3953	200.0			5:25:09	8:45:09					
09224	106	69	1821 Aug 13	14:26:43	Penumbral	-1.3066	-0.5292	179.2			12:57:07	15:56:19					
09270	106	70	1839 Aug 24	21:52:11	Penumbral	-1.3743	-0.6560	155.5			20:34:26	23:09:56					
09315	106	71	1857 Sep 04	5:22:14	Penumbral	-1.4376	-0.7748	127.6			4:18:26	6:26:02					
09359	106	72	1875 Sep 15	12:57:27	Penumbral	-1.4955	-0.8839	93.2			12:10:51	13:44:03					
09403	106	73	1893 Sep 25	20:39:00	Penumbral	-1.5476	-0.9825	38.9			20:19:33	20:58:27					

== See also ==
- List of lunar eclipses
  - List of Saros series for lunar eclipses
