= Lunar Saros 100 =

Eclipse cycle of the moon

Saros cycle series 100 for lunar eclipses occurred at the moon's ascending node, 18 years 11 and 1/3 days. It contained 72 events.

This lunar saros was linked to Solar Saros 107.

Cat.	Saros	Mem	Date	Time UT (hr:mn)	Type	Gamma	Magnitude	Duration (min)			Contacts UT (hr:mn)						Chart
Cat.	Saros	Mem	Date	Greatest	Type	Gamma	Magnitude	Pen.	Par.	Tot.	P1	P4	U1	U2	U3	U4	Chart
05860	100	1	439 Dec 6	18:28:44	Penumbral	1.572	-1.0584	22.5			18:17:29	18:39:59					
05904	100	2	457 Dec 17	2:49:24	Penumbral	1.5642	-1.0423	40.5			2:29:09	3:09:39					
05950	100	3	475 Dec 28	11:11:04	Penumbral	1.5564	-1.0262	51.9			10:45:07	11:37:01					
05996	100	4	494 Jan 7	19:29:20	Penumbral	1.5456	-1.0041	64.8			18:56:56	20:01:44					
06041	100	5	512 Jan 19	3:44:14	Penumbral	1.5313	-0.9753	78.5			3:04:59	4:23:29					
06086	100	6	530 Jan 29	11:53:03	Penumbral	1.5117	-0.9366	94.2			11:05:57	12:40:09					
06131	100	7	548 Feb 09	19:56:47	Penumbral	1.4871	-0.8884	110.7			19:01:26	20:52:08					
06177	100	8	566 Feb 20	3:53:05	Penumbral	1.4558	-0.8280	128.2			2:48:59	4:57:11					
06223	100	9	584 Mar 02	11:42:34	Penumbral	1.4183	-0.7558	146.1			10:29:31	12:55:37					
06270	100	10	602 Mar 13	19:24:44	Penumbral	1.3739	-0.6711	164.1			18:02:41	20:46:47					
06317	100	11	620 Mar 24	3:00:44	Penumbral	1.3235	-0.5755	181.7			1:29:53	4:31:35					
06363	100	12	638 Apr 04	10:29:18	Penumbral	1.2660	-0.4669	199.1			8:49:45	12:08:51					
06409	100	13	656 Apr 14	17:53:08	Penumbral	1.2035	-0.3492	215.5			16:05:23	19:40:53					
06454	100	14	674 Apr 26	1:11:35	Penumbral	1.1354	-0.2214	231.0			23:16:05	3:07:05					
06500	100	15	692 May 6	8:27:53	Penumbral	1.0645	-0.0888	245.0			6:25:23	10:30:23					
06544	100	16	710 May 17	15:39:32	Partial	0.9885	0.0528	258.1	51.8		13:30:29	17:48:35	15:13:38			16:05:26	
06588	100	17	728 May 27	22:51:52	Partial	0.9121	0.1950	269.6	97.3		20:37:04	1:06:40	22:03:13			23:40:31	
06632	100	18	746 Jun 08	6:02:24	Partial	0.8329	0.3421	279.9	125.8		3:42:27	8:22:21	4:59:30			7:05:18	
06676	100	19	764 Jun 18	13:15:57	Partial	0.7555	0.4856	288.6	146.2		10:51:39	15:40:15	12:02:51			14:29:03	
06719	100	20	782 Jun 29	20:30:03	Partial	0.6776	0.6296	296.1	162.3		18:02:00	22:58:06	19:08:54			21:51:12	
06761	100	21	800 Jul 10	3:50:05	Partial	0.6037	0.7660	302.2	174.5		1:18:59	6:21:11	2:22:50			5:17:20	
06802	100	22	818 Jul 21	11:13:59	Partial	0.5321	0.8979	307.2	184.2		8:40:23	13:47:35	9:41:53			12:46:05	
06843	100	23	836 Jul 31	18:44:36	Total	0.4654	1.0207	311.2	191.7	21.7	16:09:00	21:20:12	17:08:45	18:33:45	18:55:27	20:20:27	
06883	100	24	854 Aug 12	2:21:32	Total	0.4033	1.1347	314.2	197.3	53.4	23:44:26	4:58:38	0:42:53	1:54:50	2:48:14	4:00:11	
06924	100	25	872 Aug 22	10:06:58	Total	0.3477	1.2364	316.4	201.5	68.4	7:28:46	12:45:10	8:26:13	9:32:46	10:41:10	11:47:43	
06966	100	26	890 Sep 02	18:00:35	Total	0.2983	1.3268	318.0	204.4	77.7	15:21:35	20:39:35	16:18:23	17:21:44	18:39:26	19:42:47	
07008	100	27	908 Sep 13	2:02:20	Total	0.2550	1.4057	319.1	206.5	84.0	23:22:47	4:41:53	0:19:05	1:20:20	2:44:20	3:45:35	
07048	100	28	926 Sep 24	10:13:22	Total	0.2190	1.4711	319.8	207.9	88.1	7:33:28	12:53:16	8:29:25	9:29:19	10:57:25	11:57:19	
07089	100	29	944 Oct 04	18:32:45	Total	0.1896	1.5246	320.1	208.8	90.8	15:52:42	21:12:48	16:48:21	17:47:21	19:18:09	20:17:09	
07130	100	30	962 Oct 16	3:00:36	Total	0.1670	1.5655	320.3	209.2	92.5	0:20:27	5:40:45	1:16:00	2:14:21	3:46:51	4:45:12	
07171	100	31	980 Oct 26	11:35:12	Total	0.1498	1.5967	320.3	209.5	93.6	8:55:03	14:15:21	9:50:27	10:48:24	12:22:00	13:19:57	
07213	100	32	998 Nov 06	20:16:42	Total	0.1379	1.6181	320.2	209.5	94.2	17:36:36	22:56:48	18:31:57	19:29:36	21:03:48	22:01:27	
07257	100	33	1016 Nov 17	5:02:51	Total	0.1298	1.6328	320.0	209.5	94.6	2:22:51	7:42:51	3:18:06	4:15:33	5:50:09	6:47:36	
07301	100	34	1034 Nov 28	13:52:33	Total	0.1246	1.6422	319.7	209.4	94.8	11:12:42	16:32:24	12:07:51	13:05:09	14:39:57	15:37:15	
07346	100	35	1052 Dec 08	22:44:34	Total	0.1212	1.6486	319.5	209.3	94.9	20:04:49	1:24:19	20:59:55	21:57:07	23:32:01	0:29:13	
07390	100	36	1070 Dec 20	7:37:34	Total	0.1190	1.6531	319.2	209.3	95.0	4:57:58	10:17:10	5:52:55	6:50:04	8:25:04	9:22:13	
07435	100	37	1088 Dec 30	16:29:04	Total	0.1152	1.6608	319.0	209.3	95.2	13:49:34	19:08:34	14:44:25	15:41:28	17:16:40	18:13:43	
07482	100	38	1107 Jan 11	1:17:57	Total	0.1092	1.6726	318.8	209.4	95.5	22:38:33	3:57:21	23:33:15	0:30:12	2:05:42	3:02:39	
07528	100	39	1125 Jan 21	10:02:47	Total	0.0998	1.6908	318.6	209.6	96	7:23:29	12:42:05	8:17:59	9:14:47	10:50:47	11:47:35	
07574	100	40	1143 Feb 1	18:43:18	Total	0.087	1.7154	318.5	209.9	96.7	16:04:03	21:22:33	16:58:21	17:54:57	19:31:39	20:28:15	
07621	100	41	1161 Feb 12	3:16:14	Total	0.0677	1.7521	318.5	210.2	97.4	0:36:59	5:55:29	1:31:08	2:27:32	4:04:56	5:01:20	
07668	100	42	1179 Feb 23	11:43:09	Total	0.0435	1.7978	318.5	210.6	98.1	9:03:54	14:22:24	9:57:51	10:54:06	12:32:12	13:28:27	
07714	100	43	1197 Mar 5	20:01:37	Total	0.0119	1.8571	318.4	210.9	98.7	17:22:25	22:40:49	18:16:10	19:12:16	20:50:58	21:47:04	
07760	100	44	1215 Mar 17	4:13:33	Total	-0.0249	1.8344	318.3	211.1	98.7	1:34:24	6:52:42	2:28:00	3:24:12	5:02:54	5:59:06	
07806	100	45	1233 Mar 27	12:15:38	Total	-0.0700	1.7529	318.0	210.8	98.0	9:36:38	14:54:38	10:30:14	11:26:38	13:04:38	14:01:02	
07851	100	46	1251 Apr 07	20:11:51	Total	-0.1198	1.6625	317.5	210.1	96.0	17:33:06	22:50:36	18:26:48	19:23:51	20:59:51	21:56:54	
07895	100	47	1269 Apr 18	3:59:31	Total	-0.1768	1.5585	316.5	208.6	92.4	1:21:16	6:37:46	2:15:13	3:13:19	4:45:43	5:43:49	
07940	100	48	1287 Apr 29	11:41:31	Total	-0.2383	1.4463	315.0	206.3	86.5	9:04:01	14:19:01	9:58:22	10:58:16	12:24:46	13:24:40	
07986	100	49	1305 May 9	19:16:38	Total	-0.3054	1.3234	312.8	202.8	77.1	16:40:14	21:53:02	17:35:14	18:38:05	19:55:11	20:58:02	
08029	100	50	1323 May 21	2:48:09	Total	-0.3753	1.1953	310.0	198.0	62.6	0:13:09	5:23:09	1:09:09	2:16:51	3:19:27	4:27:09	
08071	100	51	1341 May 31	10:15:31	Total	-0.4482	1.0612	306.4	191.6	36.5	7:42:19	12:48:43	8:39:43	9:57:16	10:33:46	11:51:19	
08113	100	52	1359 Jun 11	17:39:47	Partial	-0.5233	0.9228	301.9	183.5		15:08:50	20:10:44	16:08:02			19:11:32	
08154	100	53	1377 Jun 22	1:02:58	Partial	-0.5989	0.7831	296.5	173.5		22:34:43	3:31:13	23:36:13			2:29:43	
08195	100	54	1395 Jul 03	8:26:04	Partial	-0.6743	0.6434	290.2	161.2		6:00:58	10:51:10	7:05:28			9:46:40	
08236	100	55	1413 Jul 13	15:50:27	Partial	-0.7479	0.5068	283.2	146.5		13:28:51	18:12:03	14:37:12			17:03:42	
08278	100	56	1431 Jul 24	23:16:42	Partial	-0.8195	0.3735	275.4	128.6		20:59:00	1:34:24	22:12:24			0:21:00	
08319	100	57	1449 Aug 04	6:47:06	Partial	-0.8872	0.2473	267.0	106.8		4:33:36	9:00:36	5:53:42			7:40:30	
08360	100	58	1467 Aug 15	14:22:17	Partial	-0.9504	0.1289	258.4	78.6		12:13:05	16:31:29	13:42:59			15:01:35	
08400	100	59	1485 Aug 25	22:01:58	Partial	-1.0093	0.0183	249.4	30.1		19:57:16	0:06:40	21:46:55			22:17:01	
08440	100	60	1503 Sep 06	5:48:25	Penumbral	-1.0620	-0.0811	240.6			3:48:07	7:48:43					
08480	100	61	1521 Sep 16	13:41:13	Penumbral	-1.1087	-0.1695	232.1			11:45:10	15:37:16					
08521	100	62	1539 Sep 27	21:41:55	Penumbral	-1.1485	-0.2455	224.4			19:49:43	23:34:07					
08564	100	63	1557 Oct 08	5:47:56	Penumbral	-1.1834	-0.3122	217.2			3:59:20	7:36:32					
08607	100	64	1575 Oct 19	14:02:17	Penumbral	-1.2107	-0.3652	211.4			12:16:35	15:47:59					
08650	100	65	1593 Nov 08	22:22:02	Penumbral	-1.2329	-0.4086	206.6			20:38:44	0:05:20					
08694	100	66	1611 Nov 20	6:48:14	Penumbral	-1.2493	-0.4411	203.1			5:06:41	8:29:47					
08738	100	67	1629 Nov 30	15:17:32	Penumbral	-1.2625	-0.4676	200.4			13:37:20	16:57:44					
08782	100	68	1647 Dec 11	23:51:13	Penumbral	-1.2717	-0.4864	198.7			22:11:52	1:30:34					
08827	100	69	1665 Dec 22	8:25:41	Penumbral	-1.2796	-0.5028	197.3			6:47:02	10:04:20					
08873	100	70	1684 Jan 02	17:00:34	Penumbral	-1.2865	-0.5169	196.1			15:22:31	18:38:37					
08919	100	71	1702 Jan 14	1:33:37	Penumbral	-1.2943	-0.5324	194.5			23:56:22	3:10:52					
08965	100	72	1720 Jan 25	10:04:09	Penumbral	-1.3033	-0.5498	192.3			8:28:00	11:40:18					
09012	100	73	1738 Feb 04	18:29:02	Penumbral	-1.3164	-0.5747	188.6			16:54:44	20:03:20					
09059	100	74	1756 Feb 16	2:47:53	Penumbral	-1.3339	-0.6071	183.2			1:16:17	4:19:29					
09105	100	75	1774 Feb 26	10:58:53	Penumbral	-1.3568	-0.6494	175.3			9:31:14	12:26:32					
09150	100	76	1792 Mar 08	19:02:23	Penumbral	-1.3848	-0.7011	164.5			17:40:08	20:24:38					
09195	100	77	1810 Mar 21	2:54:49	Penumbral	-1.4209	-0.7674	148.7			1:40:28	4:09:10					
09240	100	78	1828 Mar 31	10:38:46	Penumbral	-1.4630	-0.8446	126.9			9:35:19	11:42:13					
09287	100	79	1846 Apr 11	18:11:36	Penumbral	-1.5131	-0.9366	92.6			17:25:18	18:57:54					

== See also ==
- List of lunar eclipses
  - List of Saros series for lunar eclipses
