= Lunar Saros 160 =

Series of lunar eclipses

Saros cycle series 160 for lunar eclipses occurs at the moon's ascending node, 18 years 11 and 1/3 days. It contains 72 events.

This lunar saros is linked to Solar Saros 167.

Cat.	Saros	Mem	Date	Time UT (hr:mn)	Type	Gamma	Magnitude	Duration (min)			Contacts UT (hr:mn)						Chart
Cat.	Saros	Mem	Date	Greatest	Type	Gamma	Magnitude	Pen.	Par.	Tot.	P1	P4	U1	U2	U3	U4	Chart
10236	160	1	2248 Oct 03	15:52:04	Penumbral	1.5365	-0.9836	73.3			15:15:25	16:28:43					
10282	160	2	2266 Oct 14	23:23:02	Penumbral	1.4969	-0.9139	109.4			22:28:20	0:17:44					
10328	160	3	2284 Oct 25	7:01:35	Penumbral	1.4633	-0.8553	132.6			5:55:17	8:07:53					
10374	160	4	2302 Nov 06	14:46:26	Penumbral	1.4353	-0.8068	149.3			13:31:47	16:01:05					
10420	160	5	2320 Nov 16	22:38:58	Penumbral	1.4138	-0.7701	161.1			21:18:25	23:59:31					
10466	160	6	2338 Nov 28	6:37:25	Penumbral	1.3976	-0.7428	169.7			5:12:34	8:02:16					
10511	160	7	2356 Dec 08	14:40:36	Penumbral	1.3857	-0.7232	176.0			13:12:36	16:08:36					
10556	160	8	2374 Dec 19	22:47:53	Penumbral	1.3775	-0.7103	180.5			21:17:38	0:18:08					
10600	160	9	2392 Dec 30	6:57:20	Penumbral	1.3717	-0.7011	183.8			5:25:26	8:29:14					
10645	160	10	2411 Jan 10	15:08:15	Penumbral	1.3675	-0.6946	186.2			13:35:09	16:41:21					
10689	160	11	2429 Jan 20	23:16:44	Penumbral	1.3620	-0.6854	189.1			21:42:11	0:51:17					
10733	160	12	2447 Feb 01	7:24:27	Penumbral	1.3562	-0.6754	191.8			5:48:33	9:00:21					
10776	160	13	2465 Feb 11	15:26:51	Penumbral	1.3470	-0.6587	195.8			13:48:57	17:04:45					
10818	160	14	2483 Feb 22	23:24:23	Penumbral	1.3340	-0.6346	201.0			21:43:53	1:04:53					
10859	160	15	2501 Mar 06	7:13:33	Penumbral	1.3146	-0.5985	208.2			5:29:27	8:57:39					
10900	160	16	2519 Mar 17	14:56:26	Penumbral	1.2905	-0.5537	216.6			13:08:08	16:44:44					
10940	160	17	2537 Mar 27	22:29:42	Penumbral	1.2589	-0.4949	226.8			20:36:18	0:23:06					
10982	160	18	2555 Apr 08	5:53:58	Penumbral	1.2203	-0.4230	238.4			3:54:46	7:53:10					
11024	160	19	2573 Apr 18	13:08:28	Penumbral	1.1738	-0.3367	251.2			11:02:52	15:14:04					
11064	160	20	2591 Apr 29	20:14:12	Penumbral	1.1201	-0.2371	264.6			18:01:54	22:26:30					
11104	160	21	2609 May 11	3:10:50	Penumbral	1.0591	-0.1241	278.4			0:51:38	5:30:02					
11144	160	22	2627 May 22	9:59:12	Partial	0.9914	0.0011	292.1	8.0		7:33:09	12:25:15	9:55:12			10:03:12	
11185	160	23	2645 Jun 01	16:40:36	Partial	0.9179	0.1369	305.2	89.8		14:08:00	19:13:12	15:55:42			17:25:30	
11226	160	24	2663 Jun 12	23:16:24	Partial	0.8395	0.2816	317.7	126.1		20:37:33	1:55:15	22:13:21			0:19:27	
11269	160	25	2681 Jun 23	5:46:34	Partial	0.7562	0.4350	329.1	153.2		3:02:01	8:31:07	4:29:58			7:03:10	
11311	160	26	2699 Jul 04	12:14:28	Partial	0.6708	0.5922	339.3	174.3		9:24:49	15:04:07	10:47:19			13:41:37	
11354	160	27	2717 Jul 15	18:39:40	Partial	0.5828	0.7541	348.2	191.3		15:45:34	21:33:46	17:04:01			20:15:19	
11396	160	28	2735 Jul 27	1:06:30	Partial	0.4956	0.9141	355.6	204.7		22:08:42	4:04:18	23:24:09			2:48:51	
11439	160	29	2753 Aug 06	7:32:44	Total	0.4075	1.0757	361.6	215.2	44.6	4:31:56	10:33:32	5:45:08	7:10:26	7:55:02	9:20:20	
11484	160	30	2771 Aug 17	14:04:20	Total	0.3232	1.2302	366.2	223.0	73.8	11:01:14	17:07:26	12:12:50	13:27:26	14:41:14	15:55:50	
11529	160	31	2789 Aug 27	20:38:53	Total	0.2408	1.3811	369.5	228.5	89.7	17:34:08	23:43:38	18:44:38	19:54:02	21:23:44	22:33:08	
11575	160	32	2807 Sep 08	3:21:14	Total	0.1643	1.5210	371.5	232.0	98.8	0:15:29	6:26:59	1:25:14	2:31:50	4:10:38	5:17:14	
11622	160	33	2825 Sep 18	10:09:06	Total	0.0918	1.6533	372.6	233.9	103.7	7:02:48	13:15:24	8:12:09	9:17:15	11:00:57	12:06:03	
11669	160	34	2843 Sep 29	17:07:01	Total	0.0270	1.7717	372.8	234.5	105.6	14:00:37	20:13:25	15:09:46	16:14:13	17:59:49	19:04:16	
11715	160	35	2861 Oct 10	0:12:28	Total	-0.0322	1.7613	372.4	234.0	105.2	21:06:16	3:18:40	22:15:28	23:19:52	1:05:04	2:09:28	
11761	160	36	2879 Oct 21	7:27:46	Total	-0.0838	1.6660	371.5	232.9	103.4	4:22:01	10:33:31	5:31:19	6:36:04	8:19:28	9:24:13	
11807	160	37	2897 Oct 31	14:52:00	Total	-0.1285	1.5833	370.3	231.3	100.6	11:46:51	17:57:09	12:56:21	14:01:42	15:42:18	16:47:39	
11852	160	38	2915 Nov 12	22:26:46	Total	-0.1646	1.5165	368.9	229.6	97.4	19:22:19	1:31:13	20:31:58	21:38:04	23:15:28	0:21:34	
11897	160	39	2933 Nov 23	6:10:08	Total	-0.1945	1.4612	367.5	227.8	94.1	3:06:23	9:13:53	4:16:14	5:23:05	6:57:11	8:04:02	
11942	160	40	2951 Dec 04	14:01:47	Total	-0.2179	1.4179	366.1	226.1	91.0	10:58:44	17:04:50	12:08:44	13:16:17	14:47:17	15:54:50	
11989	160	41	2969 Dec 14	22:00:51	Total	-0.2358	1.3852	364.7	224.7	88.3	18:58:30	1:03:12	20:08:30	21:16:42	22:45:00	23:53:12	
12033	160	42	2987 Dec 26	6:06:34	Total	-0.2484	1.3623	363.4	223.5	86.3	3:04:52	9:08:16	4:14:49	5:23:25	6:49:43	7:58:19	

== See also ==
- List of lunar eclipses
  - List of Saros series for lunar eclipses
