= Lunar Saros 161 =

Eclipse cycle of the moon

Saros cycle series 161 for lunar eclipses occurs at the moon's descending node, repeats every 18 years 11 and 1/3 days. It contains 73 events (48 listed by 3000).

This lunar saros is linked to Solar Saros 168.

Cat.	Saros	Mem	Date	Time UT (hr:mn)	Type	Gamma	Magnitude	Duration (min)			Contacts UT (hr:mn)						Chart
Cat.	Saros	Mem	Date	Greatest	Type	Gamma	Magnitude	Pen.	Par.	Tot.	P1	P4	U1	U2	U3	U4	Chart
10263	161	1	2259 Sep 02	14:47:56	Penumbral	-1.5668	-1.0435	30.2			14:32:50	15:03:02					
10309	161	2	2277 Sep 12	21:49:40	Penumbral	-1.4999	-0.9207	109.1			20:55:07	22:44:13					
10356	161	3	2295 Sep 24	5:00:02	Penumbral	-1.4387	-0.8086	146.4			3:46:50	6:13:14					
10402	161	4	2313 Oct 05	12:20:12	Penumbral	-1.3843	-0.7088	171.6			10:54:24	13:46:00					
10448	161	5	2331 Oct 16	19:49:56	Penumbral	-1.3365	-0.6213	190.2			18:14:50	21:25:02					
10494	161	6	2349 Oct 27	3:30:27	Penumbral	-1.2963	-0.5476	203.8			1:48:33	5:12:21					
10539	161	7	2367 Nov 07	11:20:25	Penumbral	-1.2630	-0.4867	213.8			9:33:31	13:07:19					
10583	161	8	2385 Nov 17	19:18:57	Penumbral	-1.2358	-0.4366	221.3			17:28:18	21:09:36					
10628	161	9	2403 Nov 29	3:25:44	Penumbral	-1.2145	-0.3973	226.6			1:32:26	5:19:02					
10672	161	10	2421 Dec 09	11:40:03	Penumbral	-1.1984	-0.3671	230.3			9:44:54	13:35:12					
10716	161	11	2439 Dec 20	19:59:36	Penumbral	-1.1858	-0.3434	232.7			18:03:15	21:55:57					
10760	161	12	2457 Dec 31	4:23:20	Penumbral	-1.1759	-0.3242	234.3			2:26:11	6:20:29					
10802	161	13	2476 Jan 11	12:49:31	Penumbral	-1.1672	-0.3068	235.5			10:51:46	14:47:16					
10843	161	14	2494 Jan 21	21:17:45	Penumbral	-1.1593	-0.2908	236.4			19:19:33	23:15:57					
10884	161	15	2512 Feb 03	5:43:56	Penumbral	-1.1489	-0.2698	237.7			3:45:05	7:42:47					
10924	161	16	2530 Feb 13	14:09:12	Penumbral	-1.1371	-0.2459	239.3			12:09:33	16:08:51					
10965	161	17	2548 Feb 24	22:29:44	Penumbral	-1.1206	-0.2131	241.8			20:28:50	0:30:38					
11007	161	18	2566 Mar 07	6:46:52	Penumbral	-1.1006	-0.1738	244.9			4:44:25	8:49:19					
11048	161	19	2584 Mar 17	14:56:25	Penumbral	-1.0736	-0.1213	249.3			12:51:46	17:01:04					
11088	161	20	2602 Mar 29	23:01:38	Penumbral	-1.0422	-0.0609	254.2			20:54:32	1:08:44					
11128	161	21	2620 Apr 09	6:58:47	Partial	-1.0036	0.0130	260.0	26.0		4:48:47	9:08:47	6:45:47			7:11:47	
11169	161	22	2638 Apr 20	14:49:41	Partial	-0.9590	0.0978	266.4	70.4		12:36:29	17:02:53	14:14:29			15:24:53	
11210	161	23	2656 Apr 30	22:32:51	Partial	-0.9076	0.1952	273.3	97.8		20:16:12	0:49:30	21:43:57			23:21:45	
11252	161	24	2674 May 12	6:11:01	Partial	-0.8512	0.3014	280.2	119.3		3:50:55	8:31:07	5:11:22			7:10:40	
11295	161	25	2692 May 22	13:43:08	Partial	-0.7889	0.4184	287.1	137.7		11:19:35	16:06:41	12:34:17			14:51:59	
11338	161	26	2710 Jun 03	21:10:23	Partial	-0.7219	0.5439	293.7	153.6		18:43:32	23:37:14	19:53:35			22:27:11	
11380	161	27	2728 Jun 14	4:34:21	Partial	-0.6514	0.6755	299.8	167.2		2:04:27	7:04:15	3:10:45			5:57:57	
11422	161	28	2746 Jun 25	11:55:59	Partial	-0.5784	0.8114	305.3	178.6		9:23:20	14:28:38	10:26:41			13:25:17	
11466	161	29	2764 Jul 05	19:15:49	Partial	-0.5030	0.9515	310.0	188.3		16:40:49	21:50:49	17:41:40			20:49:58	
11510	161	30	2782 Jul 17	2:35:28	Total	-0.4266	1.0932	314.0	196.2	45.2	23:58:28	5:12:28	0:57:22	2:12:52	2:58:04	4:13:34	
11556	161	31	2800 Jul 27	9:56:36	Total	-0.3507	1.2337	317.1	202.3	68.4	7:18:03	12:35:09	8:15:27	9:22:24	10:30:48	11:37:45	
11603	161	32	2818 Aug 07	17:20:37	Total	-0.2767	1.3702	319.4	206.9	82.0	14:40:55	20:00:19	15:37:10	16:39:37	18:01:37	19:04:04	
11651	161	33	2836 Aug 18	0:46:58	Total	-0.2040	1.5043	320.9	210.1	90.7	22:06:31	3:27:25	23:01:55	0:01:37	1:32:19	2:32:01	
11697	161	34	2854 Aug 29	8:19:05	Total	-0.1357	1.6300	321.8	212.1	96.0	5:38:11	10:59:59	6:33:02	7:31:05	9:07:05	10:05:08	
11743	161	35	2872 Sep 08	15:55:59	Total	-0.0708	1.7491	322.0	213.0	98.8	13:14:59	18:36:59	14:09:29	15:06:35	16:45:23	17:42:29	
11789	161	36	2890 Sep 19	23:40:17	Total	-0.0118	1.8572	321.8	213.1	99.7	20:59:23	2:21:11	21:53:44	22:50:26	0:30:08	1:26:50	
11834	161	37	2908 Oct 01	7:29:50	Total	0.0432	1.7990	321.2	212.5	99.1	4:49:14	10:10:26	5:43:35	6:40:17	8:19:23	9:16:05	
11879	161	38	2926 Oct 12	15:28:29	Total	0.0907	1.7113	320.4	211.5	97.5	12:48:17	18:08:41	13:42:44	14:39:44	16:17:14	17:14:14	
11924	161	39	2944 Oct 22	23:33:47	Total	0.1330	1.6330	319.4	210.2	95.2	20:54:05	2:13:29	21:48:41	22:46:11	0:21:23	1:18:53	
11970	161	40	2962 Nov 03	7:47:44	Total	0.1683	1.5675	318.4	208.8	92.5	5:08:32	10:26:56	6:03:20	7:01:29	8:33:59	9:32:08	
12015	161	41	2980 Nov 13	16:08:41	Total	0.1980	1.5122	317.5	207.4	89.8	13:29:56	18:47:26	14:24:59	15:23:47	16:53:35	17:52:23	
12059	161	42	2998 Nov 25	0:38:12	Total	0.2210	1.4693	316.7	206.2	87.3	21:59:51	3:16:33	22:55:06	23:54:33	1:21:51	2:21:18	

== See also ==
- List of lunar eclipses
  - List of Saros series for lunar eclipses
