= Lunar Saros 101 =

Series of lunar eclipses

Saros cycle series 101 for lunar eclipses occurred at the moon's descending node, 18 years 11 and 1/3 days. It contained 72 events.

This lunar saros was linked to Solar Saros 108.

Cat.	Saros	Mem	Date	Time UT (hr:mn)	Type	Gamma	Magnitude	Duration (min)			Contacts UT (hr:mn)						Chart
Cat.	Saros	Mem	Date	Greatest	Type	Gamma	Magnitude	Pen.	Par.	Tot.	P1	P4	U1	U2	U3	U4	Chart
05677	101	1	360 Sep 11	22:17:15	Penumbral	-1.5179	-0.9065	60.5			21:47:00	22:47:30					
05718	101	2	378 Sep 23	6:34:46	Penumbral	-1.4867	-0.8505	87.9			5:50:49	7:18:43					
05759	101	3	396 Oct 03	14:59:50	Penumbral	-1.4618	-0.8060	104.5			14:07:35	15:52:05					
05800	101	4	0414 Oct 14	23:32:16	Penumbral	-1.4429	-0.7723	115.5			22:34:31	0:30:01					
05842	101	5	0432 Oct 25	8:11:22	Penumbral	-1.4296	-0.7489	122.7			7:10:01	9:12:43					
05886	101	6	0450 Nov 5	16:56:38	Penumbral	-1.4212	-0.7345	127			15:53:08	18:00:08					
05931	101	7	0468 Nov 16	1:45:15	Penumbral	-1.4158	-0.7253	129.8			0:40:21	2:50:09					
05978	101	8	0486 Nov 27	10:37:44	Penumbral	-1.4138	-0.7222	130.9			9:32:17	11:43:11					
06023	101	9	504 Dec 07	19:30:38	Penumbral	-1.4123	-0.7197	131.8			18:24:44	20:36:32					
06068	101	10	522 Dec 19	4:24:18	Penumbral	-1.4120	-0.7193	132.0			3:18:18	5:30:18					
06113	101	11	540 Dec 29	13:14:13	Penumbral	-1.4089	-0.7135	133.5			12:07:28	14:20:58					
06159	101	12	559 Jan 09	22:02:29	Penumbral	-1.4049	-0.7059	135.3			20:54:50	23:10:08					
06205	101	13	577 Jan 20	6:44:41	Penumbral	-1.3962	-0.6894	139.1			5:35:08	7:54:14					
06251	101	14	595 Jan 31	15:21:36	Penumbral	-1.3838	-0.6661	144.3			14:09:27	16:33:45					
06299	101	15	613 Feb 10	23:50:12	Penumbral	-1.3651	-0.6311	151.8			22:34:18	1:06:06					
06345	101	16	631 Feb 22	8:12:23	Penumbral	-1.3416	-0.5874	160.6			6:52:05	9:32:41					
06391	101	17	649 Mar 04	16:25:34	Penumbral	-1.3112	-0.5308	171.2			14:59:58	17:51:10					
06436	101	18	667 Mar 16	0:30:20	Penumbral	-1.2744	-0.4628	183.0			22:58:50	2:01:50					
06481	101	19	685 Mar 26	8:26:20	Penumbral	-1.2310	-0.3826	195.7			6:48:29	10:04:11					
06527	101	20	703 Apr 06	16:14:43	Penumbral	-1.1820	-0.2923	208.9			14:30:16	17:59:10					
06571	101	21	721 Apr 16	23:54:57	Penumbral	-1.1268	-0.1909	222.3			22:03:48	1:46:06					
06615	101	22	739 Apr 28	7:28:09	Penumbral	-1.0662	-0.0799	235.6			5:30:21	9:25:57					
06659	101	23	757 May 8	14:55:18	Partial	-1.0014	0.0387	248.6	43.5		12:51:00	16:59:36	14:33:33			15:17:03	
06703	101	24	775 May 19	22:17:38	Partial	-0.9333	0.1630	260.9	88.1		20:07:11	0:28:05	21:33:35			23:01:41	
06745	101	25	793 May 30	5:34:46	Partial	-0.8615	0.2938	272.7	116.4		3:18:25	7:51:07	4:36:34			6:32:58	
06787	101	26	811 Jun 10	12:50:09	Partial	-0.7888	0.4258	283.5	137.8		10:28:24	15:11:54	11:41:15			13:59:03	
06827	101	27	829 Jun 20	20:03:13	Partial	-0.7151	0.5594	293.4	155.2		17:36:31	22:29:55	18:45:37			21:20:49	
06867	101	28	847 Jul 02	3:17:32	Partial	-0.6429	0.6900	302.2	169.3		0:46:26	5:48:38	1:52:53			4:42:11	
06908	101	29	865 Jul 12	10:31:09	Partial	-0.5710	0.8198	310.2	181.1		7:56:03	13:06:15	9:00:36			12:01:42	
06949	101	30	883 Jul 23	17:49:11	Partial	-0.5035	0.9412	317.0	190.5		15:10:41	20:27:41	16:13:56			19:24:26	
06991	101	31	901 Aug 03	1:09:31	Total	-0.4388	1.0573	323.0	198.2	36.5	22:28:01	3:51:01	23:30:25	0:51:16	1:27:46	2:48:37	
07032	101	32	919 Aug 14	8:35:22	Total	-0.3793	1.1637	328.2	204.3	59.8	5:51:16	11:19:28	6:53:13	8:05:28	9:05:16	10:17:31	
07073	101	33	937 Aug 24	16:05:45	Total	-0.3243	1.2616	332.7	209.2	73.3	13:19:24	18:52:06	14:21:09	15:29:06	16:42:24	17:50:21	
07114	101	34	955 Sep 04	23:43:41	Total	-0.2763	1.3465	336.5	212.9	82.0	20:55:26	2:31:56	21:57:14	23:02:41	0:24:41	1:30:08	
07155	101	35	973 Sep 15	7:27:56	Total	-0.2346	1.4199	339.7	215.8	87.9	4:38:05	10:17:47	5:40:02	6:43:59	8:11:53	9:15:50	
07196	101	36	991 Sep 26	15:18:46	Total	-0.1991	1.4818	342.6	218.0	92.0	12:27:28	18:10:04	13:29:46	14:32:46	16:04:46	17:07:46	
07240	101	37	1009 Oct 06	23:17:13	Total	-0.1707	1.5308	345.1	219.7	94.7	20:24:40	2:09:46	21:27:22	22:29:52	0:04:34	1:07:04	
07285	101	38	1027 Oct 18	7:22:25	Total	-0.1486	1.5685	347.3	220.9	96.6	4:28:46	10:16:04	5:31:58	6:34:07	8:10:43	9:12:52	
07329	101	39	1045 Oct 28	15:33:52	Total	-0.1325	1.5951	349.2	221.9	97.7	12:39:16	18:28:28	13:42:55	14:45:01	16:22:43	17:24:49	
07373	101	40	1063 Nov 08	23:49:19	Total	-0.1205	1.6146	351.1	222.8	98.5	20:53:46	2:44:52	21:57:55	23:00:04	0:38:34	1:40:43	
07417	101	41	1081 Nov 19	8:09:51	Total	-0.1135	1.6251	352.7	223.5	99.0	5:13:30	11:06:12	6:18:06	7:20:21	8:59:21	10:01:36	
07463	101	42	1099 Nov 30	16:32:22	Total	-0.1086	1.6322	354.2	224.1	99.4	13:35:16	19:29:28	14:40:19	15:42:40	17:22:04	18:24:25	
07509	101	43	1117 Dec 11	0:56:11	Total	-0.1054	1.6363	355.7	224.7	99.7	21:58:20	3:54:02	23:03:50	0:06:20	1:46:02	2:48:32	
07555	101	44	1135 Dec 22	9:18:55	Total	-0.1019	1.6414	357	225.3	100	6:20:25	12:17:25	7:26:16	8:28:55	10:08:55	11:11:34	
07602	101	45	1154 Jan 1	17:39:57	Total	-0.0975	1.6484	358.3	226	100.4	14:40:48	20:39:06	15:46:57	16:49:45	18:30:09	19:32:57	
07650	101	46	1172 Jan 13	1:56:16	Total	-0.0899	1.6616	359.6	226.7	101	22:56:28	4:56:04	0:02:55	1:05:46	2:46:46	3:49:37	
07696	101	47	1190 Jan 23	10:07:00	Total	-0.0782	1.6828	360.8	227.6	101.7	7:06:36	13:07:24	8:13:12	9:16:09	10:57:51	12:00:48	
07742	101	48	1208 Feb 03	18:10:32	Total	-0.0610	1.7140	362.0	228.4	102.6	15:09:32	21:11:32	16:16:20	17:19:14	19:01:50	20:04:44	
07788	101	49	1226 Feb 14	2:06:28	Total	-0.0381	1.7561	363.1	229.3	103.4	23:04:55	5:08:01	0:11:49	1:14:46	2:58:10	4:01:07	
07833	101	50	1244 Feb 25	9:51:50	Total	-0.0073	1.8129	364.1	230.1	104.1	6:49:47	12:53:53	7:56:47	8:59:47	10:43:53	11:46:53	
07878	101	51	1262 Mar 07	17:28:17	Total	0.0302	1.7710	364.9	230.6	104.2	14:25:50	20:30:44	15:32:59	16:36:11	18:20:23	19:23:35	
07923	101	52	1280 Mar 18	0:53:37	Total	0.0761	1.6872	365.4	230.6	103.2	21:50:55	3:56:19	22:58:19	0:02:01	1:45:13	2:48:55	
07968	101	53	1298 Mar 29	8:10:17	Total	0.1286	1.5911	365.4	229.9	100.6	5:07:35	11:12:59	6:15:20	7:19:59	9:00:35	10:05:14	
08012	101	54	1316 Apr 08	15:14:51	Total	0.1902	1.4785	364.7	228.2	95.4	12:12:30	18:17:12	13:20:45	14:27:09	16:02:33	17:08:57	
08055	101	55	1334 Apr 19	22:12:11	Total	0.2569	1.3562	363.3	225.1	86.7	19:10:32	1:13:50	20:19:38	21:28:50	22:55:32	0:04:44	
08097	101	56	1352 Apr 30	4:59:28	Total	0.3309	1.2205	360.7	220.2	71.9	1:59:07	7:59:49	3:09:22	4:23:31	5:35:25	6:49:34	
08138	101	57	1370 May 11	11:41:22	Total	0.4088	1.0777	357.0	213.3	44.8	8:42:52	14:39:52	9:54:43	11:18:58	12:03:46	13:28:01	
08179	101	58	1388 May 21	18:15:06	Partial	0.4926	0.9237	351.9	203.7		15:19:09	21:11:03	16:33:15			19:56:57	
08220	101	59	1406 Jun 02	0:46:25	Partial	0.5777	0.7671	345.3	191.2		21:53:46	3:39:04	23:10:49			2:22:01	
08261	101	60	1424 Jun 12	7:13:02	Partial	0.6657	0.6051	337.1	174.8		4:24:29	10:01:35	5:45:38			8:40:26	
08303	101	61	1442 Jun 23	13:39:06	Partial	0.7535	0.4432	327.3	153.7		10:55:27	16:22:45	12:22:15			14:55:57	
08344	101	62	1460 Jul 03	20:04:26	Partial	0.8412	0.2813	315.7	125.7		17:26:35	22:42:17	19:01:35			21:07:17	
08384	101	63	1478 Jul 15	2:32:38	Partial	0.9258	0.1249	302.7	85.8		0:01:17	5:03:59	1:49:44			3:15:32	
08424	101	64	1496 Jul 25	9:03:59	Penumbral	1.0074	-0.0260	288.3			6:39:50	11:28:08					
08464	101	65	1514 Aug 05	15:39:55	Penumbral	1.0845	-0.1690	272.6			13:23:37	17:56:13					
08505	101	66	1532 Aug 15	22:22:09	Penumbral	1.1559	-0.3016	256.0			20:14:09	0:30:09					
08547	101	67	1550 Aug 27	5:11:29	Penumbral	1.2210	-0.4226	238.8			3:12:05	7:10:53					
08591	101	68	1568 Sep 06	12:08:34	Penumbral	1.2796	-0.5317	221.2			10:17:58	13:59:10					
08634	101	69	1586 Sep 27	19:14:33	Penumbral	1.3306	-0.6270	203.8			17:32:39	20:56:27					
08677	101	70	1604 Oct 08	2:29:43	Penumbral	1.3742	-0.7084	187.1			0:56:10	4:03:16					
08722	101	71	1622 Oct 19	9:54:38	Penumbral	1.4097	-0.7750	171.9			8:28:41	11:20:35					
08766	101	72	1640 Oct 29	17:27:12	Penumbral	1.4390	-0.8301	157.8			16:08:18	18:46:06					
08810	101	73	1658 Nov 10	1:09:24	Penumbral	1.4609	-0.8712	146.2			23:56:18	2:22:30					
08855	101	74	1676 Nov 20	8:58:24	Penumbral	1.4777	-0.9028	136.5			7:50:09	10:06:39					
08901	101	75	1694 Dec 01	16:54:29	Penumbral	1.4889	-0.9238	129.5			15:49:44	17:59:14					
08947	101	76	1712 Dec 13	0:53:52	Penumbral	1.4977	-0.9401	123.4			23:52:10	1:55:34					
08994	101	77	1730 Dec 24	8:58:03	Penumbral	1.5032	-0.9498	119.3			7:58:24	9:57:42					
09040	101	78	1749 Jan 03	17:03:06	Penumbral	1.5085	-0.9589	115.0			16:05:36	18:00:36					
09087	101	79	1767 Jan 15	1:08:11	Penumbral	1.5141	-0.9680	110.2			0:13:05	2:03:17					
09132	101	80	1785 Jan 25	9:10:57	Penumbral	1.5218	-0.9808	103.2			8:19:21	10:02:33					
09177	101	81	1803 Feb 06	17:10:42	Penumbral	1.5322	-0.9980	93.0			16:24:12	17:57:12					
09222	101	82	1821 Feb 17	1:05:17	Penumbral	1.5470	-1.0230	76.8			0:26:53	1:43:41					
09268	101	83	1839 Feb 28	8:53:39	Penumbral	1.5671	-1.0576	46.8			8:30:15	9:17:03					

== See also ==
- List of lunar eclipses
  - List of Saros series for lunar eclipses
