= Lunar Saros 153 =

Series of lunar eclipses

Saros cycle series 153 for lunar eclipses occurs at the moon's descending node, repeats every 18 years 11 and 1/3 days. It contains 71 events.

Cat.	Saros	Mem	Date	Time UT (hr:mn)	Type	Gamma	Magnitude	Duration (min)			Contacts UT (hr:mn)						Chart
Cat.	Saros	Mem	Date	Greatest	Type	Gamma	Magnitude	Pen.	Par.	Tot.	P1	P4	U1	U2	U3	U4	Chart
09962	153	1	2136 Apr 16	17:08:45	Penumbral	-1.5241	-0.9174	53.3			16:42:06	17:35:24					
10006	153	2	2154 Apr 28	1:04:33	Penumbral	-1.4784	-0.8328	93.2			0:17:57	1:51:09					
10049	153	3	2172 May 08	8:53:18	Penumbral	-1.4275	-0.7389	122.7			7:51:57	9:54:39					
10092	153	4	2190 May 19	16:35:26	Penumbral	-1.3714	-0.6357	147.8			15:21:32	17:49:20					
10135	153	5	2208 May 31	0:10:37	Penumbral	-1.3102	-0.5233	170.4			22:45:25	1:35:49					
10179	153	6	2226 Jun 11	7:41:30	Penumbral	-1.2459	-0.4056	190.6			6:06:12	9:16:48					
10224	153	7	2244 Jun 21	15:07:43	Penumbral	-1.1783	-0.2820	209.0			13:23:13	16:52:13					
10270	153	8	2262 Jul 02	22:31:30	Penumbral	-1.1089	-0.1556	225.7			20:38:39	0:24:21					
10316	153	9	2280 Jul 13	5:52:36	Penumbral	-1.0376	-0.0259	240.9			3:52:09	7:53:03					
10362	153	10	2298 Jul 24	13:14:16	Partial	-0.9673	0.1017	254.5	70.0		11:07:01	15:21:31	12:39:16			13:49:16	
10408	153	11	2316 Aug 04	20:36:17	Partial	-0.8979	0.2273	266.6	103.1		18:22:59	22:49:35	19:44:44			21:27:50	
10454	153	12	2334 Aug 16	3:59:52	Partial	-0.8304	0.3493	277.3	125.9		1:41:13	6:18:31	2:56:55			5:02:49	
10500	153	13	2352 Aug 26	11:26:40	Partial	-0.7660	0.4651	286.8	143.1		9:03:16	13:50:04	10:15:07			12:38:13	
10545	153	14	2370 Sep 06	18:57:22	Partial	-0.7056	0.5736	295.0	156.7		16:29:52	21:24:52	17:39:01			20:15:43	
10589	153	15	2388 Sep 17	2:33:17	Partial	-0.6501	0.6727	302.2	167.5		0:02:11	5:04:23	1:09:32			3:57:02	
10634	153	16	2406 Sep 28	10:14:02	Partial	-0.5994	0.7629	308.4	176.2		7:39:50	12:48:14	8:45:56			11:42:08	
10678	153	17	2424 Oct 08	18:01:43	Partial	-0.5553	0.8409	313.7	183.0		15:24:52	20:38:34	16:30:13			19:33:13	
10722	153	18	2442 Oct 20	1:55:57	Partial	-0.5172	0.9079	318.3	188.4		23:16:48	4:35:06	0:21:45			3:30:09	
10766	153	19	2460 Oct 30	9:56:53	Partial	-0.4853	0.9636	322.2	192.7		7:15:47	12:37:59	8:20:32			11:33:14	
10808	153	20	2478 Nov 10	18:04:53	Total	-0.4598	1.0074	325.5	195.9	13.3	15:22:08	20:47:38	16:26:56	17:58:14	18:11:32	19:42:50	
10850	153	21	2496 Nov 21	2:19:04	Total	-0.4399	1.0411	328.4	198.4	31.1	23:34:52	5:03:16	0:39:52	2:03:31	2:34:37	3:58:16	
10891	153	22	2514 Dec 03	10:39:16	Total	-0.4258	1.0644	330.8	200.3	38.8	7:53:52	13:24:40	8:59:07	10:19:52	10:58:40	12:19:25	
10931	153	23	2532 Dec 13	19:02:44	Total	-0.4148	1.0822	332.9	201.8	43.7	16:16:17	21:49:11	17:21:50	18:40:53	19:24:35	20:43:38	
10972	153	24	2550 Dec 25	3:31:04	Total	-0.4084	1.0918	334.7	202.8	46.1	0:43:43	6:18:25	1:49:40	3:08:01	3:54:07	5:12:28	
11014	153	25	2569 Jan 04	12:00:29	Total	-0.4031	1.0997	336.4	203.8	48.0	9:12:17	14:48:41	10:18:35	11:36:29	12:24:29	13:42:23	
11054	153	26	2587 Jan 15	20:31:07	Total	-0.3996	1.1046	337.9	204.6	49.2	17:42:10	23:20:04	18:48:49	20:06:31	20:55:43	22:13:25	
11094	153	27	2605 Jan 27	4:58:58	Total	-0.3944	1.1129	339.4	205.6	51.1	2:09:16	7:48:40	3:16:10	4:33:25	5:24:31	6:41:46	
11134	153	28	2623 Feb 07	13:25:20	Total	-0.3887	1.1224	341.0	206.7	53.2	10:34:50	16:15:50	11:41:59	12:58:44	13:51:56	15:08:41	
11175	153	29	2641 Feb 17	21:46:04	Total	-0.3787	1.1401	342.7	208.1	56.7	18:54:43	0:37:25	20:02:01	21:17:43	22:14:25	23:30:07	
11216	153	30	2659 Mar 01	6:01:08	Total	-0.3649	1.1648	344.5	209.9	61.2	3:08:53	8:53:23	4:16:11	5:30:32	6:31:44	7:46:05	
11259	153	31	2677 Mar 11	14:08:06	Total	-0.3451	1.2010	346.6	212.2	67.0	11:14:48	17:01:24	12:22:00	13:34:36	14:41:36	15:54:12	
11302	153	32	2695 Mar 22	22:07:31	Total	-0.3199	1.2470	348.9	214.8	73.3	19:13:04	1:01:58	20:20:07	21:30:52	22:44:10	23:54:55	
11345	153	33	2713 Apr 03	5:57:08	Total	-0.2874	1.3067	351.4	217.8	80.1	3:01:26	8:52:50	4:08:14	5:17:05	6:37:11	7:46:02	
11387	153	34	2731 Apr 14	13:37:27	Total	-0.2478	1.3794	353.9	221.0	87.0	10:40:30	16:34:24	11:46:57	12:53:57	14:20:57	15:27:57	
11430	153	35	2749 Apr 24	21:07:32	Total	-0.2004	1.4663	356.5	224.1	93.4	18:09:17	0:05:47	19:15:29	20:20:50	21:54:14	22:59:35	
11474	153	36	2767 May 6	4:28:53	Total	-0.1468	1.5648	358.9	226.9	98.8	1:29:26	7:28:20	2:35:26	3:39:29	5:18:17	6:22:20	
11518	153	37	2785 May 16	11:39:40	Total	-0.0850	1.6781	361.0	229.2	102.8	8:39:10	14:40:10	9:45:04	10:48:16	12:31:04	13:34:16	
11564	153	38	2803 May 27	18:42:59	Total	-0.0179	1.8012	362.5	230.6	104.8	15:41:44	21:44:14	16:47:41	17:50:35	19:35:23	20:38:17	
11611	153	39	2821 Jun 07	1:37:38	Total	0.0556	1.7316	363.3	230.9	104.4	22:35:59	4:39:17	23:42:11	0:45:26	2:29:50	3:33:05	
11658	153	40	2839 Jun 18	8:27:21	Total	0.1326	1.5898	363.3	229.8	100.8	5:25:42	11:29:00	6:32:27	7:36:57	9:17:45	10:22:15	
11704	153	41	2857 Jun 28	15:09:08	Total	0.2153	1.4375	362.2	226.9	92.9	12:08:02	18:10:14	13:15:41	14:22:41	15:55:35	17:02:35	
11750	153	42	2875 Jul 09	21:48:44	Total	0.2988	1.2834	360.1	222.2	79.5	18:48:41	0:48:47	19:57:38	21:08:59	22:28:29	23:39:50	
11797	153	43	2893 Jul 20	4:23:43	Total	0.3852	1.1239	356.6	215.3	55.6	1:25:25	7:22:01	2:36:04	3:55:55	4:51:31	6:11:22	
11842	153	44	2911 Aug 01	10:59:11	Partial	0.4704	0.9662	352.0	206.1		8:03:11	13:55:11	9:16:08			12:42:14	
11887	153	45	2929 Aug 11	17:32:45	Partial	0.5564	0.8070	346.1	194.2		14:39:42	20:25:48	15:55:39			19:09:51	
11932	153	46	2947 Aug 23	0:10:11	Partial	0.6384	0.6549	339.2	179.9		21:20:35	2:59:47	22:40:14			1:40:08	
11978	153	47	2965 Sep 02	6:49:42	Partial	0.7177	0.5077	331.3	162.5		4:04:03	9:35:21	5:28:27			8:10:57	
12023	153	48	2983 Sep 13	13:34:03	Partial	0.7923	0.3688	322.6	141.7		10:52:45	16:15:21	12:23:12			14:44:54	

== See also ==
- List of lunar eclipses
  - List of Saros series for lunar eclipses
