= Lunar Saros 157 =

Series of lunar eclipses

Saros cycle series 157 for lunar eclipses occurs at the moon's descending node, repeats every 18 years 11 and 1/3 days. It contains 73 events.

Cat.	Saros	Mem	Date	Time UT (hr:mn)	Type	Gamma	Magnitude	Duration (min)			Contacts UT (hr:mn)						Chart
Cat.	Saros	Mem	Date	Greatest	Type	Gamma	Magnitude	Pen.	Par.	Tot.	P1	P4	U1	U2	U3	U4	Chart
10382	157	1	2306 Mar 01	13:42:55	Penumbral	-1.5675	-1.0597	47.5			13:19:10	14:06:40					
10428	157	2	2324 Mar 11	21:29:30	Penumbral	-1.5451	-1.0182	78.0			20:50:30	22:08:30					
10474	157	3	2342 Mar 23	5:08:18	Penumbral	-1.5166	-0.9654	104.3			4:16:09	6:00:27					
10519	157	4	2360 Apr 02	12:35:50	Penumbral	-1.4797	-0.8970	130.4			11:30:38	13:41:02					
10564	157	5	2378 Apr 13	19:55:16	Penumbral	-1.4366	-0.8170	154.9			18:37:49	21:12:43					
10608	157	6	2396 Apr 24	3:03:43	Penumbral	-1.3852	-0.7219	179.1			1:34:10	4:33:16					
10653	157	7	2414 May 5	10:04:13	Penumbral	-1.3275	-0.6152	202.2			8:23:07	11:45:19					
10697	157	8	2432 May 15	16:54:29	Penumbral	-1.2616	-0.4934	224.6			15:02:11	18:46:47					
10741	157	9	2450 May 26	23:38:32	Penumbral	-1.1906	-0.3626	245.5			21:35:47	1:41:17					
10784	157	10	2468 Jun 06	6:15:13	Penumbral	-1.1139	-0.2213	265.1			4:02:40	8:27:46					
10826	157	11	2486 Jun 17	12:46:55	Penumbral	-1.0329	-0.0722	283.1			10:25:22	15:08:28					
10867	157	12	2504 Jun 28	19:14:33	Partial	-0.9484	0.0831	299.4	70.5		16:44:51	21:44:15	18:39:18			19:49:48	
10908	157	13	2522 Jul 10	1:40:39	Partial	-0.8624	0.2409	313.8	117.4		23:03:45	4:17:33	0:41:57			2:39:21	
10948	157	14	2540 Jul 20	8:06:21	Partial	-0.7756	0.4001	326.4	147.7		5:23:09	10:49:33	6:52:30			9:20:12	
10990	157	15	2558 Jul 31	14:32:26	Partial	-0.6888	0.5590	337.3	170.3		11:43:47	17:21:05	13:07:17			15:57:35	
11031	157	16	2576 Aug 10	21:01:26	Partial	-0.6042	0.7139	346.4	187.5		18:08:14	23:54:38	19:27:41			22:35:11	
11071	157	17	2594 Aug 22	3:34:22	Partial	-0.5225	0.8632	353.8	200.7		0:37:28	6:31:16	1:54:01			5:14:43	
11111	157	18	2612 Sep 02	10:12:37	Total	-0.4447	1.0052	359.8	210.9	12.0	7:12:43	13:12:31	8:27:10	10:06:37	10:18:37	11:58:04	
11151	157	19	2630 Sep 13	16:57:18	Total	-0.3718	1.1381	364.3	218.5	59.0	13:55:09	19:59:27	15:08:03	16:27:48	17:26:48	18:46:33	
11192	157	20	2648 Sep 23	23:50:09	Total	-0.3051	1.2595	367.7	223.9	77.4	20:46:18	2:54:00	21:58:12	23:11:27	0:28:51	1:42:06	
11234	157	21	2666 Oct 05	6:52:02	Total	-0.2457	1.3675	370.1	227.7	88.3	3:46:59	9:57:05	4:58:11	6:07:53	7:36:11	8:45:53	
11277	157	22	2684 Oct 15	14:01:43	Total	-0.1924	1.4645	371.6	230.3	95.2	10:55:55	17:07:31	12:06:34	13:14:07	14:49:19	15:56:52	
11319	157	23	2702 Oct 27	21:21:47	Total	-0.1470	1.5467	372.5	231.8	99.4	18:15:32	0:28:02	19:25:53	20:32:05	22:11:29	23:17:41	
11362	157	24	2720 Nov 07	4:50:33	Total	-0.1083	1.6171	372.9	232.6	102.0	1:44:06	7:57:00	2:54:15	3:59:33	5:41:33	6:46:51	
11404	157	25	2738 Nov 18	12:29:42	Total	-0.0776	1.6726	372.9	232.9	103.3	9:23:15	15:36:09	10:33:15	11:38:03	13:21:21	14:26:09	
11447	157	26	2756 Nov 28	20:15:29	Total	-0.0519	1.7193	372.7	232.8	104.0	17:09:08	23:21:50	18:19:05	19:23:29	21:07:29	22:11:53	
11491	157	27	2774 Dec 10	4:10:47	Total	-0.0334	1.7531	372.2	232.6	104.2	1:04:41	7:16:53	2:14:29	3:18:41	5:02:53	6:07:05	
11537	157	28	2792 Dec 20	12:11:32	Total	-0.0186	1.7803	371.6	232.3	104.2	9:05:44	15:17:20	10:15:23	11:19:26	13:03:38	14:07:41	
11583	157	29	2810 Dec 31	20:18:19	Total	-0.0081	1.8000	370.8	231.9	104.1	17:12:55	23:23:43	18:22:22	19:26:16	21:10:22	22:14:16	
11631	157	30	2829 Jan 11	4:27:25	Total	0.0011	1.8136	369.9	231.5	104.0	1:22:28	7:32:22	2:31:40	3:35:25	5:19:25	6:23:10	
11678	157	31	2847 Jan 22	12:39:37	Total	0.0084	1.8011	368.8	231.1	103.9	9:35:13	15:44:01	10:44:04	11:47:40	13:31:34	14:35:10	
11724	157	32	2865 Feb 01	20:51:00	Total	0.0170	1.7868	367.7	230.6	103.7	17:47:09	23:54:51	18:55:42	19:59:09	21:42:51	22:46:18	
11770	157	33	2883 Feb 13	5:01:07	Total	0.0274	1.7695	366.4	230.2	103.5	1:57:55	8:04:19	3:06:01	4:09:22	5:52:52	6:56:13	
11816	157	34	2901 Feb 24	13:07:56	Total	0.0412	1.7463	365.0	229.6	103.2	10:05:26	16:10:26	11:13:08	12:16:20	13:59:32	15:02:44	
11861	157	35	2919 Mar 07	21:11:15	Total	0.0585	1.7170	363.4	229.0	102.8	18:09:33	0:12:57	19:16:45	20:19:51	22:02:39	23:05:45	
11906	157	36	2937 Mar 18	5:07:34	Total	0.0821	1.6762	361.6	228.2	101.9	2:06:46	8:08:22	3:13:28	4:16:37	5:58:31	7:01:40	
11951	157	37	2955 Mar 29	12:58:25	Total	0.1108	1.6265	359.6	227.1	100.5	9:58:37	15:58:13	11:04:52	12:08:10	13:48:40	14:51:58	
11997	157	38	2973 Apr 08	20:41:47	Total	0.1463	1.5642	357.3	225.6	98.1	17:43:08	23:40:26	18:48:59	19:52:44	21:30:50	22:34:35	
12041	157	39	2991 Apr 20	4:19:45	Total	0.1872	1.4921	354.6	223.6	94.5	1:22:27	7:17:03	2:27:57	3:32:30	5:07:00	6:11:33	

== See also ==
- List of lunar eclipses
  - List of Saros series for lunar eclipses
