= List of saros series for lunar eclipses =

Lunar eclipses are grouped by their saros number, each series lasts between 1200 and 1600 years and contains from 69 to 89 lunar eclipses. Lunar eclipses in even series exist at the ascending node of the Moon's orbit, and odd series occur at the descending nodes.

Series have been indexed as −20 to 183 (active between 2000 BCE and 3000 CE), with events summarized:

Each series begins with penumbral eclipses, transitions into partial eclipses and then total eclipses, and then reverses back to partial and penumbral. The counts for each type are listed below in sequence, and ongoing saros series are highlighted in yellow. The notes show two exceptions:

- Saros 4 started with 2 penumbral, 7 missed eclipses (penumbra missed Moon entirely), and 11 more penumbral before continuing with partial eclipses.
- Saros 13 started with 11 penumbral, 7 partial, 3 more penumbral (umbra missed Moon), and 11 more partial before continuing with total eclipses.

Lunar eclipse saros series (−20 to 183)
Saros series	Count	Length (years)	First eclipse	Last eclipse	Counts by type					
Saros series	Count	Length (years)	First eclipse	Last eclipse	Pen.	Par.	Tot.	Par.	Pen.	Notes
−20	73	1298.1	−3250 Apr 01	−1952 May 18	8	20	13	23	9	
−19	73	1298.1	−3221 Mar 11	−1923 Apr 28	7	9	27	22	8	
−18	75	1334.2	−3228 Jan 29	−1894 Apr 08	9	10	27	8	21	
−17	73	1298.1	−3109 Mar 03	−1811 Apr 20	7	8	26	8	24	
−16	75	1334.2	−3116 Jan 20	−1782 Mar 31	9	7	29	9	21	
−15	87	1550.5	−3322 Aug 12	−1771 Feb 27	22	8	29	6	22	
−14	88	1568.6	−3239 Aug 24	−1670 Mar 23	23	6	27	7	25	
−13	87	1550.5	−3192 Aug 14	−1641 Mar 03	21	7	29	8	22	
−12	84	1496.5	−3199 Jul 03	−1703 Dec 18	23	8	29	6	18	
−11	88	1568.6	−3134 Jul 05	−1565 Feb 01	25	6	26	8	23	
−10	83	1478.4	−3069 Jul 06	−1591 Dec 10	21	8	29	7	18	
−9	73	1298.1	−3058 Jun 05	−1760 Jul 23	21	10	28	7	7	
−8	74	1316.2	−2993 Jun 07	−1677 Aug 05	24	7	24	10	9	
−7	74	1316.2	−2946 May 28	−1630 Jul 27	11	19	27	9	8	
−6	73	1298.1	−2917 May 8	−1619 Jun 25	8	23	18	17	7	
−5	73	1298.1	−2852 May 9	−1554 Jun 26	10	21	11	23	8	
−4	72	1280.1	−2787 May 10	−1507 Jun 17	7	22	14	22	7	
−3	73	1298.1	−2776 Apr 09	−1478 May 28	7	24	13	21	8	
−2	73	1298.1	−2711 Apr 11	−1413 May 29	8	22	11	23	9	
−1	72	1280.1	−2646 Apr 12	−1366 May 20	6	21	15	23	7	
0	74	1316.2	−2653 Mar 01	−1337 Apr 30	8	12	25	18	11	
1	73	1298.1	−2570 Mar 14	−1272 Apr 30	8	19	14	9	23	
2	73	1298.1	−2523 Mar 03	−1225 Apr 22	7	8	28	18	12	
3	76	1352.2	−2567 Dec 30	−1214 Mar 21	11	8	29	7	21	
4	78	1514.5	−2646 Oct 06	−1131 Apr 02	13	8	25	7	25	Starting 13N=2N+7(miss)+11N
5	77	1370.3	−2455 Dec 22	−1084 Mar 24	11	7	29	8	22	
6	86	1532.5	−2624 Aug 04	−1091 Feb 10	22	8	29	6	21	
7	89	1586.6	−2595 Jul 16	−1008 Feb 22	25	7	26	7	24	
8	86	1532.5	−2494 Aug 08	−0961 Feb 13	21	7	29	7	22	
9	75	1334.2	−2501 Jun 26	−1167 Sep 05	22	9	28	7	9	
10	74	1316.2	−2454 Jun 17	−1138 Aug 15	25	7	25	8	9	
11	74	1316.2	−2371 Jun 29	−1055 Aug 27	21	8	28	8	9	
12	73	1298.1	−2360 May 28	−1062 Jul 17	9	22	27	8	7	
13	73	1298.1	−2313 May 20	−1015 Jul 06	14	18	13	20	8	Starting with 11N+7P+3N+11P
14	73	1298.1	−2230 Jun 01	−0932 Jul 19	9	20	14	22	8	
15	73	1298.1	−2219 Apr 30	−0921 Jun 19	7	23	15	21	7	
16	73	1298.1	−2172 Apr 21	−0874 Jun 08	8	24	11	21	9	
17	72	1280.1	−2089 May 4	−0809 Jun 11	7	21	13	24	7	
18	73	1298.1	−2078 Apr 02	−0780 May 21	7	21	16	21	8	
19	73	1298.1	−2031 Mar 24	−0733 May 11	8	23	11	12	19	
20	72	1280.1	−1948 Apr 05	−0668 May 12	7	9	25	22	9	
21	74	1316.2	−1955 Feb 22	−0639 Apr 23	8	8	28	11	19	
22	74	1316.2	−1926 Feb 02	−0610 Apr 02	10	9	25	7	23	
23	73	1298.1	−1825 Feb 25	−0527 Apr 14	8	6	28	9	22	
24	85	1514.5	−2031 Sep 16	−0516 Mar 14	20	7	29	8	21	
25	87	1550.5	−2038 Aug 06	−0487 Feb 21	24	8	26	7	22	
26	85	1514.5	−1919 Sep 09	−0404 Mar 06	21	6	28	8	22	
27	85	1514.5	−1926 Jul 28	−0411 Jan 23	22	7	29	7	20	
28	74	1316.2	−1897 Jul 09	−0581 Sep 06	24	7	27	7	9	
29	83	1478.4	−1814 Jul 21	−0336 Dec 24	22	7	27	8	19	
30	74	1316.2	−1803 Jun 19	−0487 Aug 18	20	10	29	7	8	
31	73	1298.1	−1774 May 30	−0476 Jul 17	22	10	24	10	7	
32	73	1298.1	−1673 Jun 23	−0375 Aug 09	19	10	14	22	8	
33	73	1298.1	−1662 May 22	−0364 Jul 10	8	22	17	19	7	
34	72	1280.1	−1615 May 13	−0335 Jun 19	8	23	13	20	8	
35	72	1280.1	−1532 May 25	−0252 Jul 01	8	20	12	24	8	
36	73	1298.1	−1521 Apr 24	−0223 Jun 11	7	22	15	22	7	
37	72	1280.1	−1492 Apr 03	−0212 May 10	8	24	12	19	9	
38	72	1280.1	−1391 Apr 27	−0111 Jun 03	7	19	14	23	9	
39	73	1298.1	−1380 Mar 26	−0082 May 14	7	10	26	21	9	
40	73	1298.1	−1369 Feb 24	−0071 Apr 12	9	10	25	8	21	
41	73	1298.1	−1268 Mar 18	0030 May 6	8	7	26	9	23	
42	74	1316.2	−1275 Feb 04	0041 Apr 05	9	7	29	9	20	
43	85	1514.5	−1463 Sep 07	0052 Mar 04	22	8	27	7	21	
44	76	1352.2	−1199 Jan 06	0153 Mar 27	12	6	27	7	24	
45	85	1514.5	−1351 Aug 29	0164 Feb 25	21	7	29	7	21	
46	76	1352.2	−1358 Jul 19	−0006 Oct 08	24	8	27	6	11	
47	86	1532.5	−1275 Jul 31	0258 Feb 05	24	6	26	8	22	
48	75	1334.2	−1228 Jul 21	0106 Sep 30	21	8	29	7	10	
49	73	1298.1	−1217 Jun 21	0081 Aug 08	22	9	27	7	8	
50	73	1298.1	−1134 Jul 03	0164 Aug 20	22	8	22	12	9	
51	73	1298.1	−1105 Jun 13	0193 Jul 31	11	19	26	10	7	
52	72	1280.1	−1076 May 23	0204 Jun 29	8	23	15	19	7	
53	72	1280.1	−0993 Jun 05	0287 Jul 12	10	20	11	23	8	
54	72	1280.1	−0946 May 26	0334 Jul 03	7	21	15	22	7	
55	72	1280.1	−0935 Apr 25	0345 Jun 01	7	24	13	20	8	
56	72	1280.1	−0852 May 7	0428 Jun 13	8	21	11	23	9	
57	73	1298.1	−0823 Apr 16	0475 Jun 05	7	19	17	22	8	
58	73	1298.1	−0812 Mar 16	0486 May 4	8	12	24	12	17	
59	71	1262.1	−0711 Apr 09	0551 May 6	7	12	21	8	23	
60	73	1298.1	−0700 Mar 08	0598 Apr 27	8	8	27	11	19	
61	78	1388.3	−0780 Dec 13	0609 Mar 26	14	8	28	7	21	
62	74	1316.2	−0624 Feb 08	0692 Apr 06	10	7	26	7	24	
63	82	1460.4	−0722 Nov 03	0739 Mar 29	17	7	28	8	22	
64	84	1496.5	−0783 Aug 20	0714 Feb 04	22	8	28	7	19	
65	86	1532.5	−0736 Aug 11	0797 Feb 16	24	7	25	8	22	
66	84	1496.5	−0671 Aug 12	0826 Jan 27	21	7	29	8	19	
67	73	1298.1	−0660 Jul 11	0638 Aug 30	21	9	28	7	8	
68	72	1280.1	−0595 Jul 14	0685 Aug 20	23	8	23	10	8	
69	73	1298.1	−0530 Jul 15	0768 Sep 01	19	9	27	10	8	
70	72	1280.1	−0519 Jun 13	0761 Jul 21	9	21	25	10	7	
71	72	1280.1	−0472 Jun 04	0808 Jul 11	12	20	11	21	8	
72	72	1280.1	−0389 Jun 17	0891 Jul 25	8	20	14	22	8	
73	72	1280.1	−0378 May 16	0902 Jun 23	7	23	14	21	7	
74	72	1280.1	−0331 May 7	0949 Jun 13	9	22	11	21	9	
75	72	1280.1	−0266 May 8	1014 Jun 15	7	21	14	23	7	
76	73	1298.1	−0255 Apr 07	1043 May 26	8	19	17	20	9	
77	72	1280.1	−0190 Apr 09	1090 May 16	8	21	13	8	22	
78	72	1280.1	−0125 Apr 10	1155 May 18	7	9	25	19	12	
79	73	1298.1	−0132 Feb 27	1166 Apr 17	9	8	28	8	20	
80	74	1316.2	−0103 Feb 07	1213 Apr 06	11	8	26	6	23	
81	74	1316.2	−0020 Feb 19	1296 Apr 19	9	7	27	9	22	
82	84	1496.5	−0208 Sep 21	1289 Mar 08	20	8	29	7	20	
83	84	1496.5	−0197 Aug 22	1300 Feb 05	24	7	26	7	20	
84	84	1496.5	−0096 Sep 13	1401 Feb 28	21	6	28	8	21	
85	76	1352.2	−0103 Aug 02	1249 Oct 23	22	8	28	7	11	
86	73	1298.1	−0074 Jul 13	1224 Aug 30	24	8	25	8	8	
87	73	1298.1	0027 Aug 06	1325 Sep 23	21	7	26	10	9	
88	72	1280.1	0038 Jul 05	1318 Aug 12	12	18	26	9	7	
89	72	1280.1	0067 Jun 15	1347 Jul 23	11	21	15	17	8	
90	72	1280.1	0150 Jun 27	1430 Aug 04	12	17	13	22	8	
91	72	1280.1	0179 Jun 07	1459 Jul 15	7	22	15	21	7	
92	71	1262.1	0208 May 17	1470 Jun 13	8	23	12	20	8	
93	71	1262.1	0291 May 30	1553 Jun 25	8	20	12	24	7	
94	71	1262.1	0320 May 9	1582 Jun 06	6	21	16	21	7	
95	71	1262.1	0349 Apr 19	1611 May 26	7	23	12	12	17	
96	71	1262.1	0432 May 1	1694 Jun 07	7	13	20	20	11	
97	72	1280.1	0443 Mar 31	1723 May 20	7	9	27	12	17	
98	74	1316.2	0436 Feb 18	1752 Apr 28	10	10	25	7	22	
99	72	1280.1	0555 Mar 24	1835 May 12	8	7	26	8	23	
100	79	1406.3	0439 Dec 06	1846 Apr 11	15	7	29	8	20	
101	83	1478.4	0360 Sep 11	1839 Feb 28	22	8	27	6	20	
102	84	1496.5	0461 Oct 05	1958 Apr 04	21	6	26	8	23	
103	82	1460.4	0472 Sep 03	1933 Feb 10	21	7	29	7	18	
104	72	1280.1	0483 Aug 04	1763 Sep 22	22	9	26	7	8	
105	73	1298.1	0566 Aug 16	1864 Oct 15	22	7	25	9	10	
106	73	1298.1	0595 Jul 27	1893 Sep 25	19	10	27	9	8	
107	72	1280.1	0606 Jun 26	1886 Aug 14	12	20	23	10	7	
108	72	1280.1	0689 Jul 08	1969 Aug 27	20	10	12	22	8	
109	71	1262.1	0736 Jun 27	1998 Aug 08	8	20	17	19	7	
110	72	1280.1	0747 May 28	2027 Jul 18	8	23	13	20	8	Latest was 2009 Jul 07 (penumbral), next is 2027 Jul 18 (penumbral)
111	71	1262.1	0830 Jun 10	2092 Jul 19	9	20	11	23	8	Latest was 2020 Jun 05 (penumbral), next is 2038 Jun 17 (penumbral)
112	72	1280.1	0859 May 20	2139 Jul 12	7	21	15	22	7	Latest was 2013 Apr 25 (partial), next is 2031 May 07 (penumbral)
113	71	1262.1	0888 Apr 29	2150 Jun 10	7	23	13	18	10	Latest was 2024 Mar 25 (penumbral), next is 2042 Apr 05 (penumbral)
114	71	1262.1	0971 May 13	2233 Jun 22	8	19	13	12	19	Latest was 2017 Feb 11 (penumbral), next is 2035 Feb 22 (penumbral)
115	72	1280.1	1000 Apr 21	2280 Jun 13	7	9	26	19	11	Latest was 2009 Dec 31 (partial), next is 2028 Jan 12 (partial)
116	73	1298.1	0993 Mar 11	2291 May 14	9	9	27	8	20	Latest was 2020 Nov 30 (penumbral), next is 2038 Dec 11 (penumbral)
117	71	1262.1	1094 Apr 03	2356 May 15	8	9	24	7	23	Latest was 2013 Oct 18 (penumbral), next is 2031 Oct 30 (penumbral)
118	73	1298.1	1105 Mar 02	2403 May 7	9	7	28	8	21	Latest was 2024 Sep 18 (partial), next is 2042 Sep 29 (penumbral)
119	82	1460.4	0935 Oct 14	2396 Mar 25	20	8	28	6	20	Latest was 2017 Aug 07 (partial), next is 2035 Aug 19 (partial)
120	83	1478.4	1000 Oct 16	2479 Apr 07	21	7	25	7	23	Latest was 2010 Jun 26 (partial), next is 2028 Jul 06 (partial)
121	82	1460.4	1047 Oct 06	2508 Mar 18	20	6	29	7	20	Latest was 2021 May 26 (total), next is 2039 Jun 06 (partial)
122	74	1316.2	1022 Aug 14	2338 Oct 29	22	8	28	7	9	Latest was 2014 Apr 15 (total), next is 2032 Apr 25 (total)
123	72	1280.1	1087 Aug 16	2367 Oct 08	24	6	25	8	9	Latest was 2025 Mar 14 (total), next is 2043 Mar 25 (total)
124	73	1298.1	1152 Aug 17	2450 Oct 21	20	8	28	8	9	Latest was 2018 Jan 31 (total), next is 2036 Feb 11 (total)
125	72	1280.1	1163 Jul 17	2443 Sep 09	17	13	26	9	7	Latest was 2010 Dec 21 (total), next is 2028 Dec 31 (total)
126	70	1244.0	1228 Jul 18	2472 Aug 19	22	8	14	19	7	Latest was 2021 Nov 19 (partial), next is 2039 Nov 30 (partial)
127	72	1280.1	1275 Jul 09	2555 Sep 02	11	18	16	20	7	Latest was 2014 Oct 08 (total), next is 2032 Oct 18 (total)
128	71	1262.1	1304 Jun 18	2566 Aug 02	7	23	15	19	7	Latest was 2025 Sep 07 (total), next is 2043 Sep 19 (total)
129	71	1262.1	1351 Jun 10	2613 Jul 24	10	21	11	21	8	Latest was 2018 Jul 27 (total), next is 2036 Aug 07 (total)
130	71	1262.1	1416 Jun 10	2678 Jul 26	8	20	14	22	7	Latest was 2011 Jun 15 (total), next is 2029 Jun 26 (total)
131	72	1280.1	1427 May 10	2707 Jul 07	7	22	15	20	8	Latest was 2022 May 16 (total), next is 2040 May 26 (total)
132	71	1262.1	1492 May 12	2754 Jun 26	8	21	12	11	19	Latest was 2015 Apr 04 (total), next is 2033 Apr 14 (total)
133	71	1262.1	1557 May 13	2819 Jun 29	7	13	21	20	10	Latest was 2026 Mar 03 (total), next is 2044 Mar 13 (total)
134	72	1280.1	1550 Apr 01	2830 May 28	8	10	26	10	18	Latest was 2019 Jan 21 (total), next is 2037 Jan 31 (total)
135	71	1262.1	1615 Apr 13	2877 May 18	9	10	23	7	22	Latest was 2011 Dec 10 (total), next is 2029 Dec 20 (total)
136	72	1280.1	1680 Apr 13	2960 Jun 01	8	7	27	8	22	Latest was 2022 Nov 08 (total), next is 2040 Nov 18 (total)
137	78	1388.3	1564 Dec 17	2953 Apr 20	15	8	28	7	20	Latest was 2015 Sep 28 (total), next is 2033 Oct 08 (total)
138	82	1460.4	1521 Oct 15	2982 Mar 30	22	7	26	6	21	Latest was 2026 Aug 28 (partial), next is 2044 Sep 07 (total)
139	79	1406.3	1658 Dec 09	3065 Apr 13	16	7	27	8	21	Latest was 2019 Jul 16 (partial), next is 2037 Jul 27 (partial)
140	77	1370.3	1597 Sep 25	2968 Jan 06	20	8	28	7	14	Latest was 2012 Jun 04 (partial), next is 2030 Jun 15 (partial)
141	72	1280.1	1608 Aug 25	2888 Oct 11	24	7	26	7	8	Latest was 2023 May 05 (penumbral), next is 2041 May 16 (partial)
142	73	1298.1	1709 Sep 19	3007 Nov 17	21	7	26	9	10	Latest was 2016 Mar 23 (penumbral), next is 2034 Apr 03 (penumbral)
143	72	1280.1	1720 Aug 18	3000 Oct 05	19	10	27	8	8	Latest was 2009 Feb 09 (penumbral), next is 2027 Feb 20 (penumbral)
144	71	1262.1	1749 Jul 29	3011 Sep 04	22	9	20	12	8	Latest was 2020 Jan 10 (penumbral), next is 2038 Jan 21 (penumbral)
145	71	1262.1	1832 Aug 11	3094 Sep 16	18	10	15	20	8	Latest was 2012 Nov 28 (penumbral), next is 2030 Dec 09 (penumbral)
146	72	1280.1	1843 Jul 11	3123 Aug 29	9	20	17	19	7	Latest was 2023 Oct 28 (partial), next is 2041 Nov 08 (partial)
147	70	1244.0	1890 Jul 02	3134 Jul 28	8	23	12	19	8	Latest was 2016 Sep 16 (penumbral), next is 2034 Sep 28 (partial)
148	70	1244.0	1973 Jul 15	3217 Aug 09	8	20	12	23	7	Latest was 2009 Aug 06 (penumbral), next is 2027 Aug 17 (penumbral)
149	71	1262.1	1984 Jun 13	3246 Jul 20	7	21	15	21	7	Latest was 2020 Jul 05 (penumbral), next is 2038 Jul 16 (penumbral)
150	71	1262.1	2013 May 25	3275 Jun 30	8	23	12	15	13	Latest was 2013 May 25 (penumbral), next is 2031 Jun 05 (penumbral)
151	71	1262.1	2096 Jun 06	3358 Jul 13	8	18	14	21	10	
152	72	1280.1	2107 May 7	3387 Jun 23	8	10	25	15	14	
153	71	1262.1	2136 Apr 16	3398 May 22	9	10	24	8	20	
154	71	1262.1	2237 May 10	3499 Jun 16	7	8	25	8	23	
155	73	1298.1	2212 Mar 18	3510 May 17	9	8	28	8	20	
156	81	1442.4	2060 Nov 08	3503 Apr 05	20	8	27	6	20	
157	73	1298.1	2306 Mar 01	3604 Apr 27	11	6	26	8	22	
158	81	1442.4	2154 Oct 21	3597 Mar 17	20	7	28	8	18	
159	73	1298.1	2147 Sep 09	3445 Nov 07	23	8	26	7	9	
160	72	1280.1	2248 Oct 03	3528 Nov 19	21	7	25	8	11	
161	73	1298.1	2259 Sep 02	3557 Oct 31	20	9	27	8	9	
162	71	1262.1	2288 Aug 12	3550 Sep 19	19	12	24	9	7	
163	70	1244.0	2371 Aug 27	3615 Sep 20	21	8	13	20	8	
164	71	1262.1	2400 Aug 05	3662 Sep 11	10	18	18	18	7	
165	71	1262.1	2411 Jul 06	3673 Aug 11	9	22	14	19	7	
166	70	1244.0	2494 Jul 18	3738 Aug 13	10	19	11	22	8	
167	71	1262.1	2541 Jul 09	3803 Aug 16	7	20	15	21	8	
168	71	1262.1	2552 Jun 08	3814 Jul 15	8	22	13	18	10	
169	70	1244.0	2635 Jun 22	3879 Jul 17	8	19	13	13	17	
170	71	1262.1	2664 Jun 01	3926 Jul 09	7	11	24	19	10	
171	71	1262.1	2675 May 1	3937 Jun 07	8	10	26	8	19	
172	70	1244.0	2758 May 15	4002 Jun 08	8	9	23	8	22	
173	72	1280.1	2787 Apr 24	4067 Jun 11	8	7	27	9	21	
174	79	1406.3	2635 Dec 16	4042 Apr 18	18	8	27	7	19	
175	74	1316.2	2791 Feb 11	4107 Apr 20	14	7	25	7	21	
176	79	1406.3	2747 Dec 09	4154 Apr 11	18	6	28	8	19	
177	73	1298.1	2704 Oct 05	4002 Dec 03	21	8	28	6	10	
178	70	1244.0	2769 Oct 07	4013 Nov 01	22	7	24	8	9	
179	73	1298.1	2816 Sep 27	4114 Nov 26	20	8	27	8	10	
180	71	1262.1	2827 Aug 28	4089 Oct 03	19	11	26	8	7	
181	69	1226.0	2892 Aug 29	4118 Sep 13	22	8	15	17	7	
182	70	1244.0	2957 Aug 31	4201 Sep 26	14	14	15	20	7	
183	70	1244.0	2968 Jul 30	4212 Aug 26	8	21	16	18	7	

== See also ==
- List of saros series for solar eclipses
- List of lunar eclipses
