= November 2022 lunar eclipse =

Total lunar eclipse on 8 November 2022

- Total eclipse
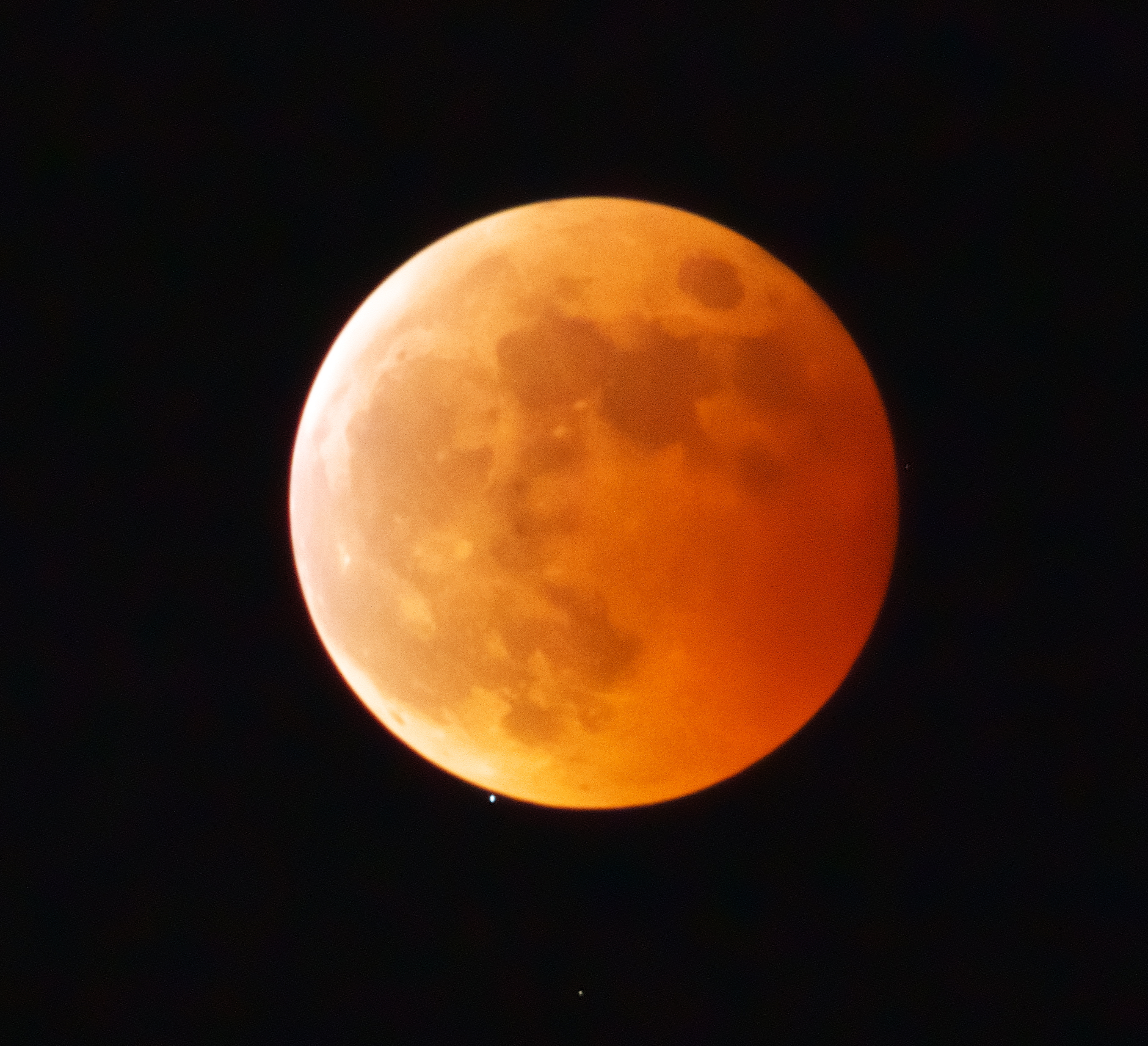
- Totality from Handa, Aichi at 11:32 UTC, with Uranus at the bottom left
- Date: November 8, 2022
- Gamma: 0.2570
- Magnitude: 1.3607
- Saros cycle: 136 (20 of 72)
- Totality: 85 minutes, 40 seconds
- Partiality: 220 minutes, 35 seconds
- Penumbral: 354 minutes, 41 seconds
Contacts (UTC)
- P1: 08:01:53
- U1: 09:08:50
- U2: 10:16:14
- Greatest: 10:59:13
- U3: 11:41:53
- U4: 12:49:25
- P4: 13:56:34

A total lunar eclipse occurred at the Moon’s ascending node of orbit on Tuesday, November 8, 2022, with an umbral magnitude of 1.3607. It was a central lunar eclipse, in which part of the Moon passed through the center of the Earth's shadow. A lunar eclipse occurs when the Moon moves into the Earth's shadow, causing the Moon to be darkened. A total lunar eclipse occurs when the Moon's near side entirely passes into the Earth's umbral shadow. Unlike a solar eclipse, which can only be viewed from a relatively small area of the world, a lunar eclipse may be viewed from anywhere on the night side of Earth. A total lunar eclipse can last up to nearly two hours, while a total solar eclipse lasts only a few minutes at any given place, because the Moon's shadow is smaller. Occurring about 5.8 days before apogee (06:41 UTC, November 14), the Moon's apparent diameter was smaller than average.

This eclipse surpassed the previous eclipse as the longest total lunar eclipse visible from nearly all of North America since August 17, 1989, and until June 26, 2029. A lunar occultation of Uranus happened during the eclipse. It was the first total lunar eclipse on Election Day in US history. The next total lunar eclipse on a possible Election Day will not occur until November 8, 2394. This event was referred in media coverage as a "beaver blood moon".

This lunar eclipse was the last of what was almost a tetrad, with the others being on May 26, 2021 (total); November 19, 2021 (partial); and May 16, 2022 (total).

== Visibility ==
The eclipse was completely visible over northeast Asia and North America, seen rising over Asia and Australia and setting over eastern North America and South America.

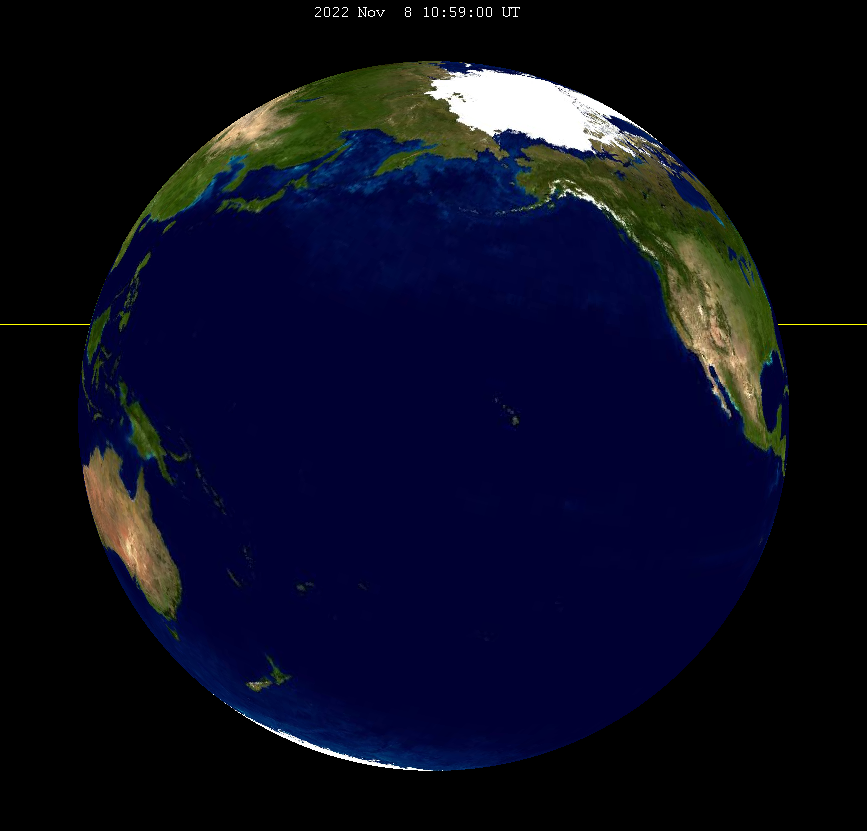
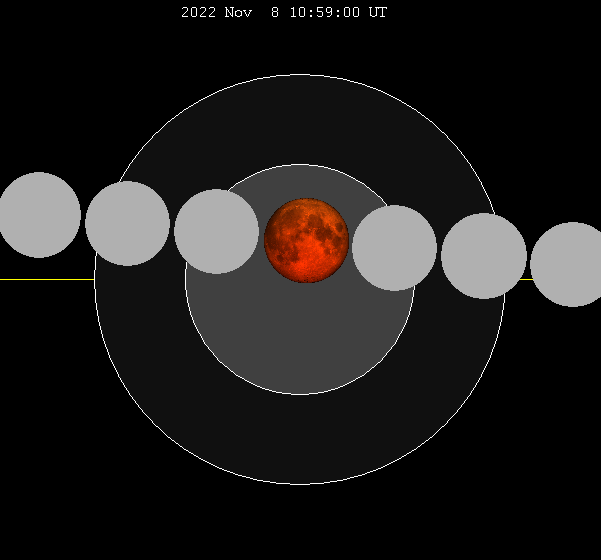
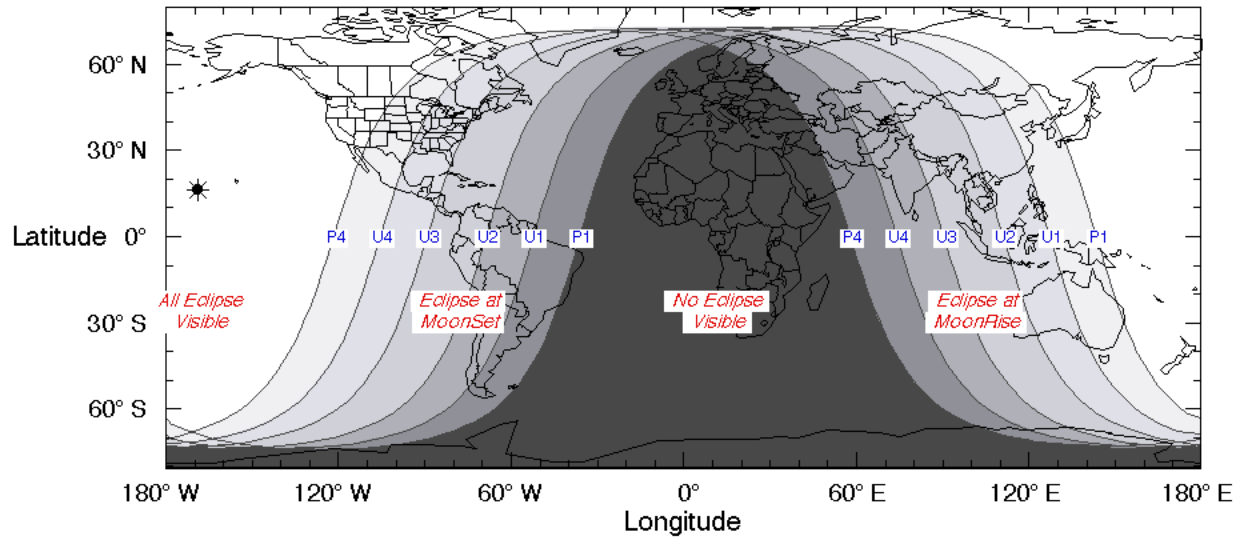
Visibility map

== Gallery ==
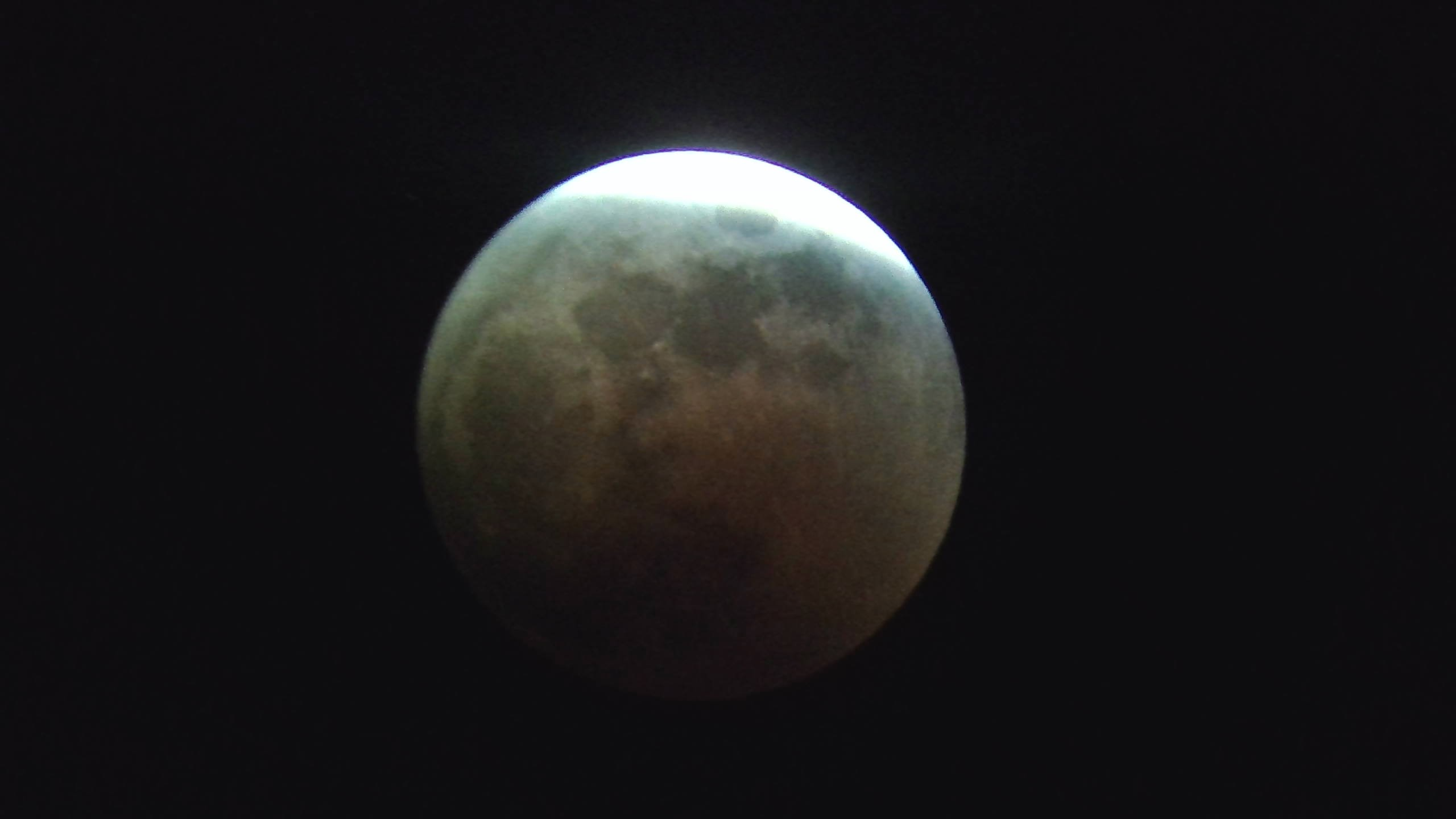
Tsukuba, Ibaraki, 10:10 UTC, shortly before totality

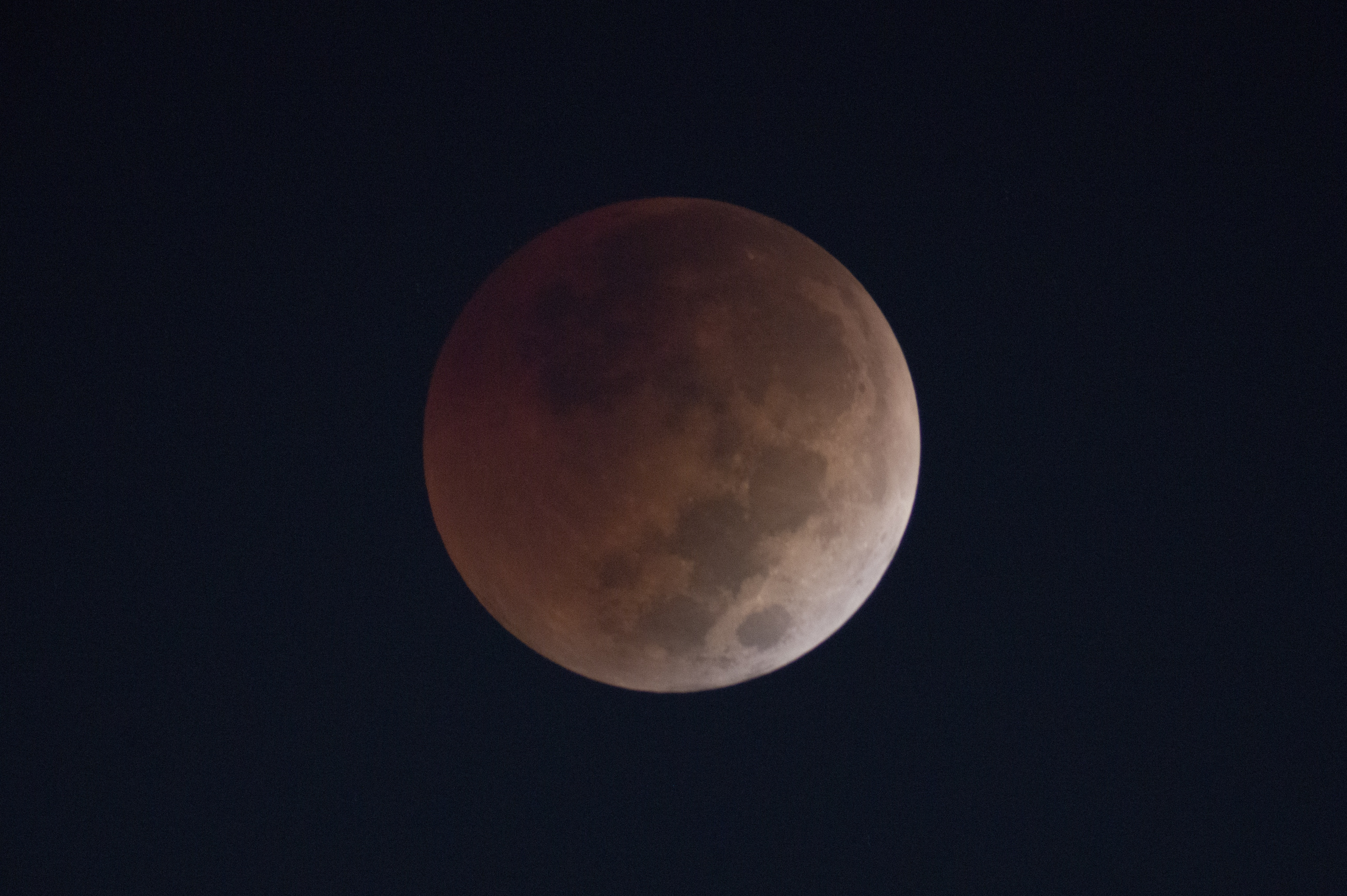
Miami, Florida, 10:26 UTC

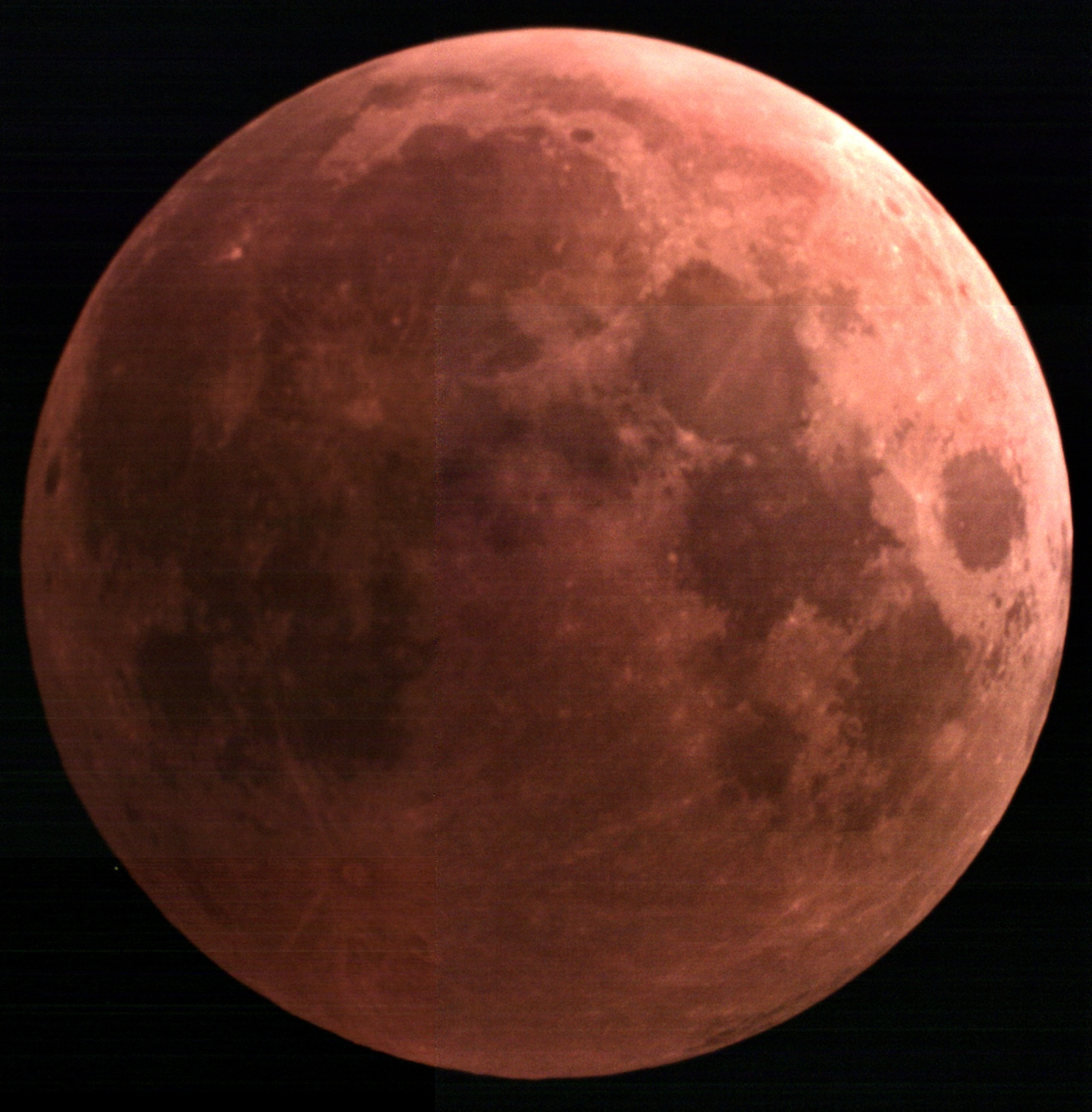
Merritt Island, Florida, ~10:33 UTC

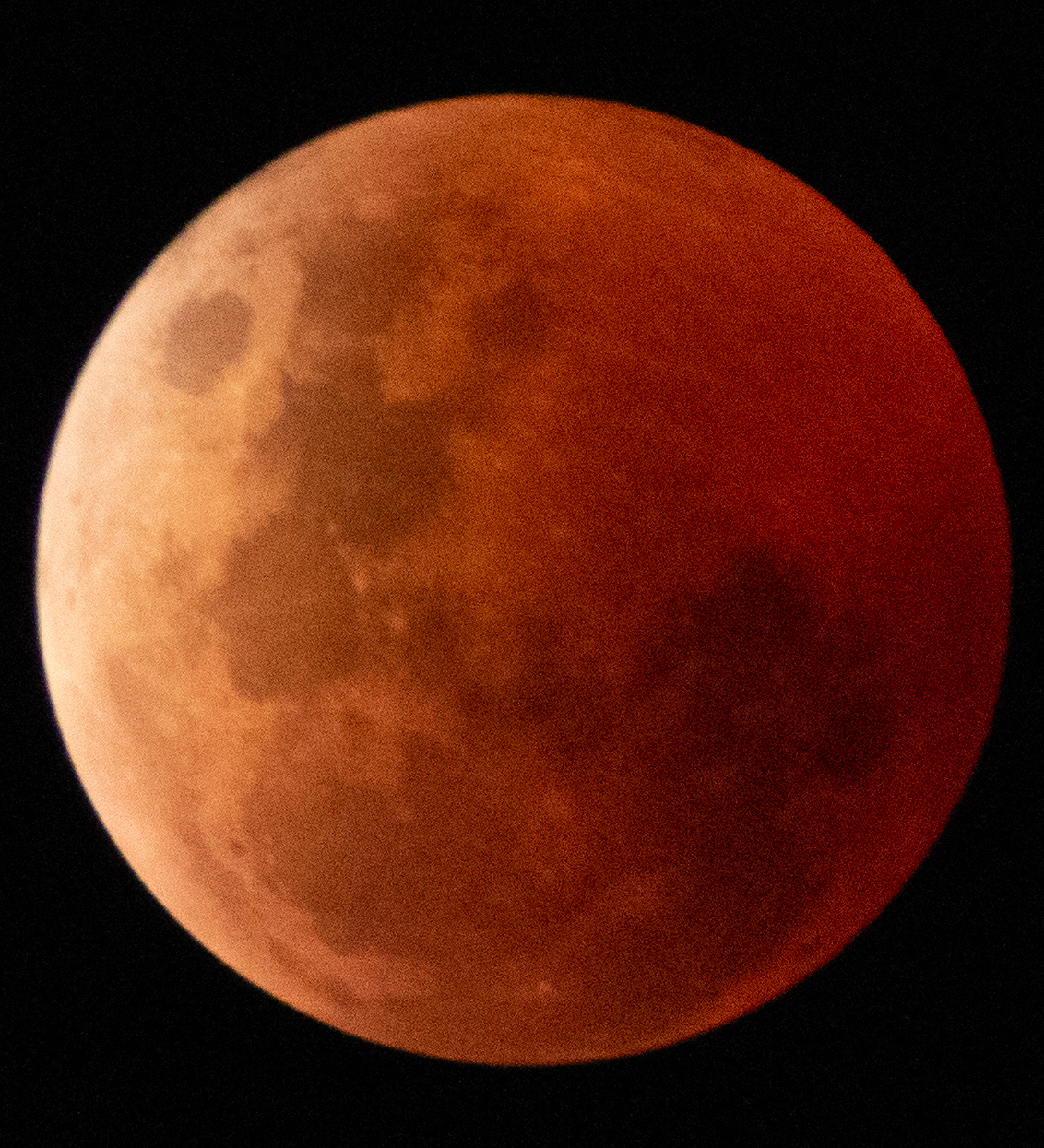
Canberra, Australia, 10:45 UTC

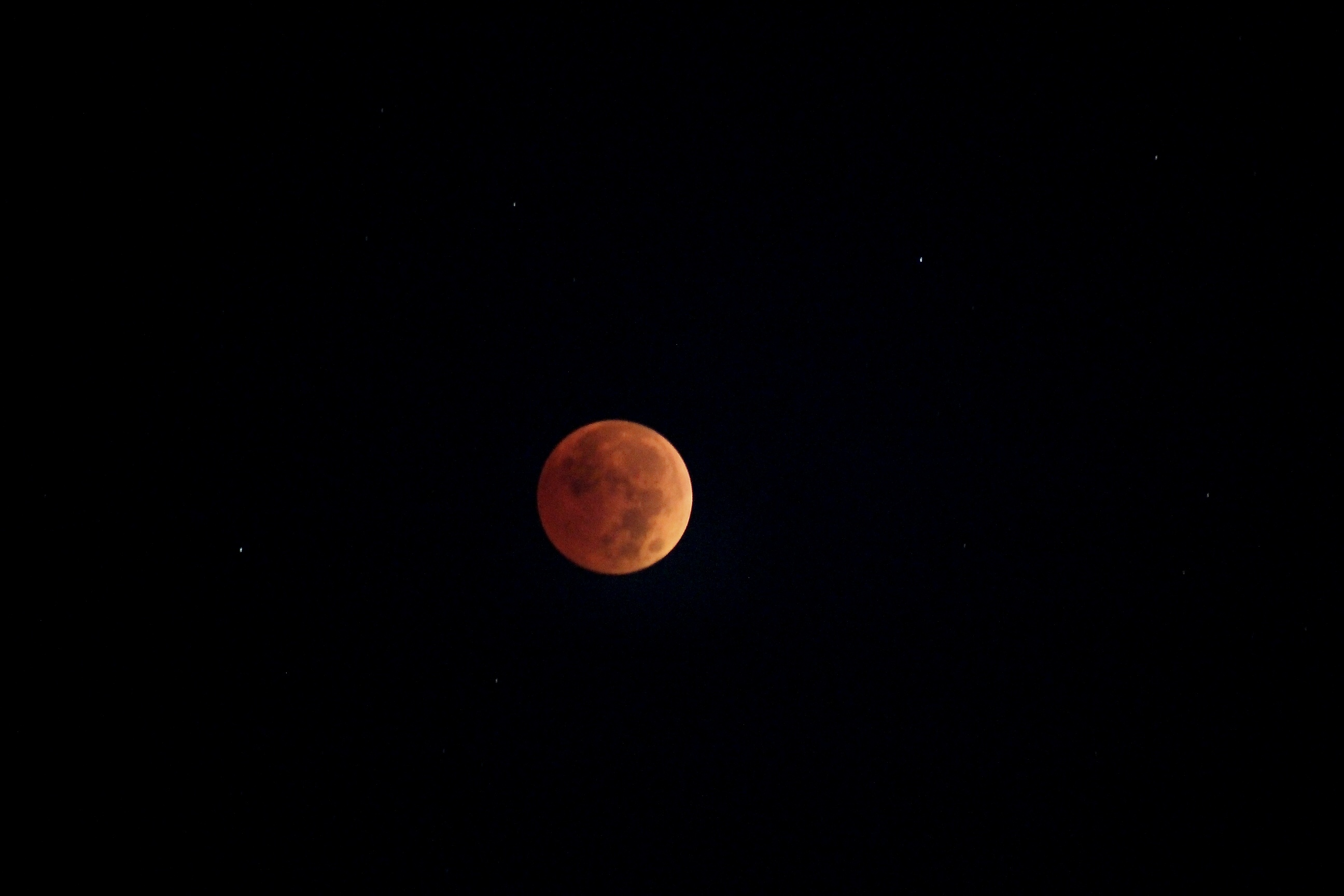
Richmond, Virginia, 10:49 UTC

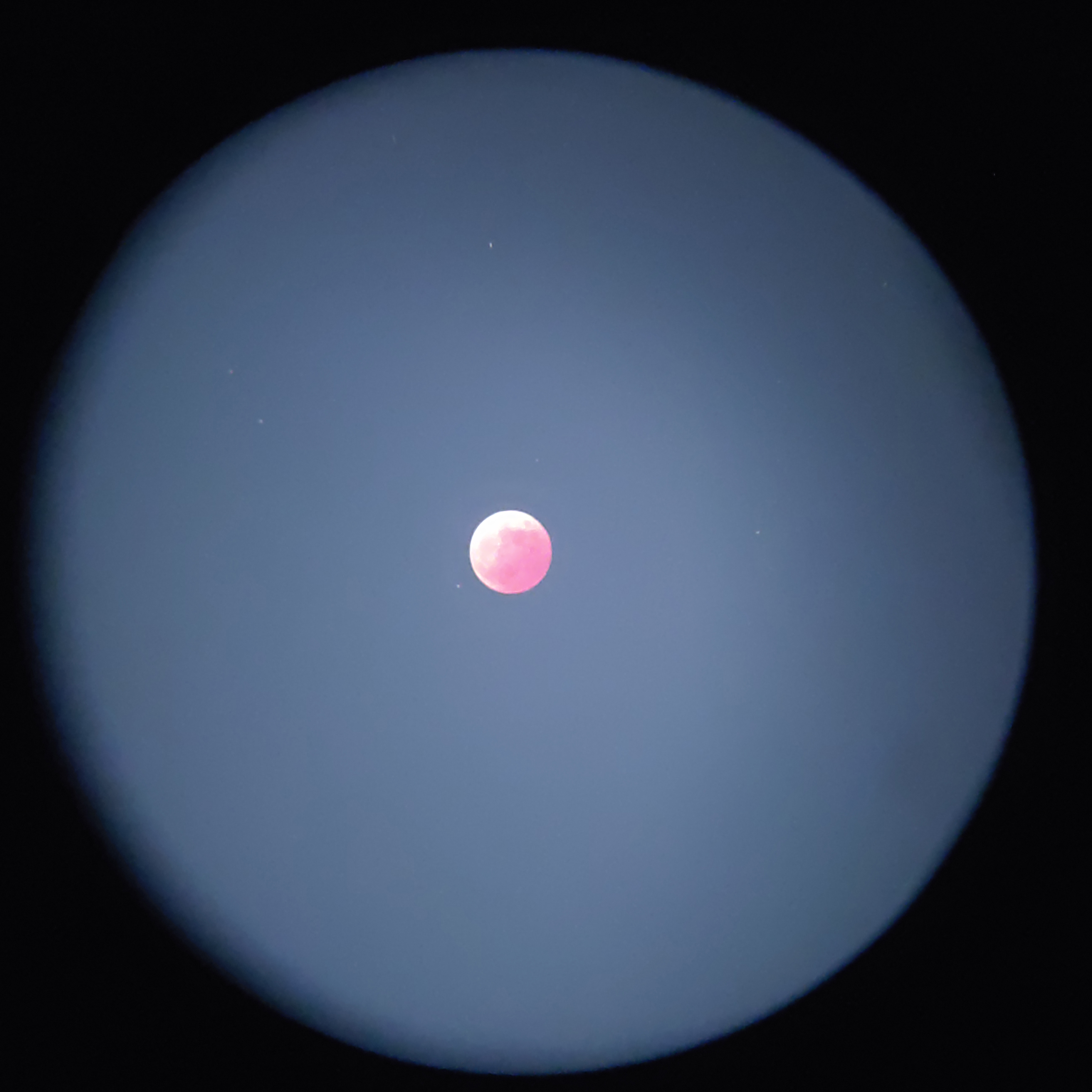
Astronomical telescope view from Yantai, China, 11:03 UTC

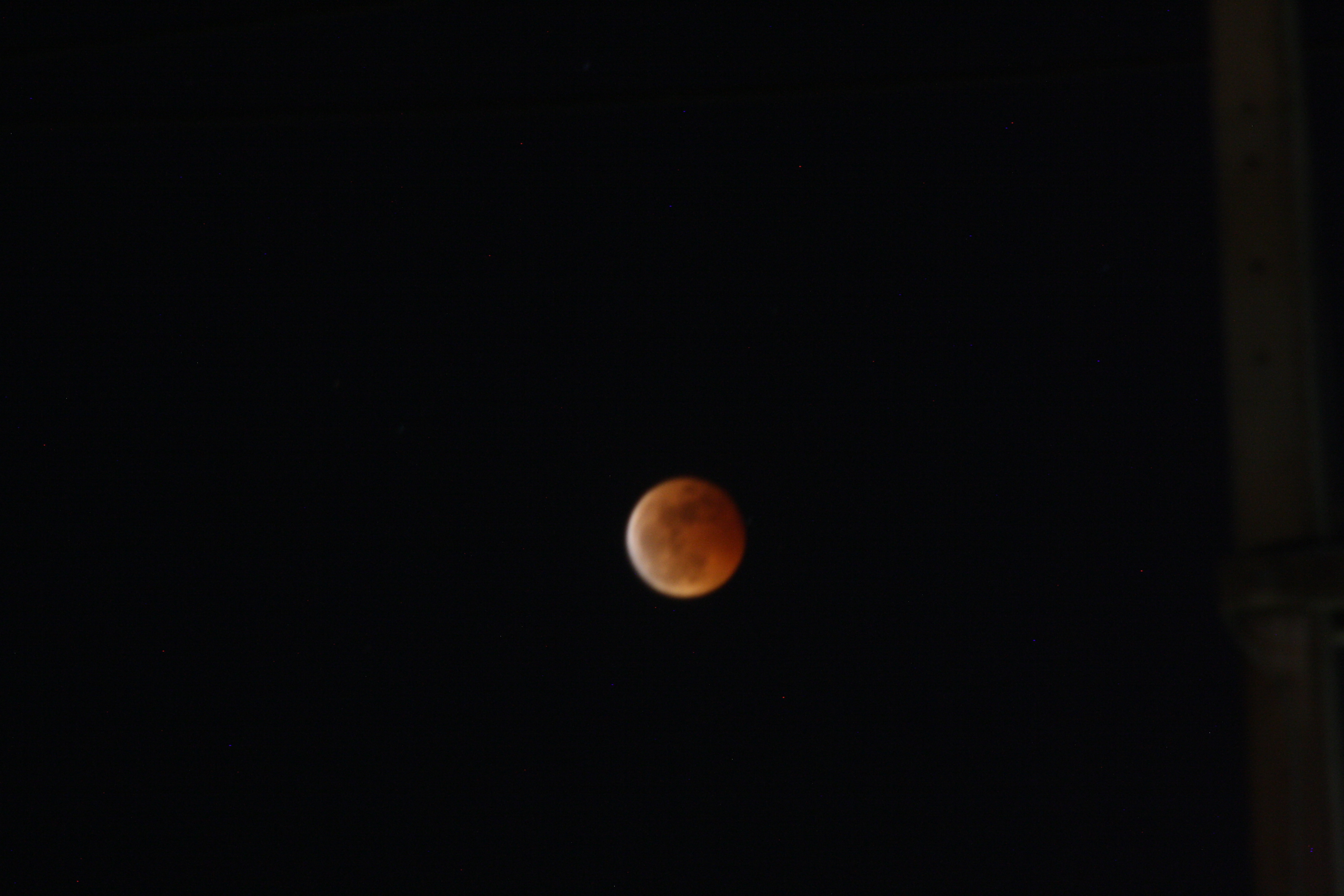
Buriram, Thailand, 11:15 UTC

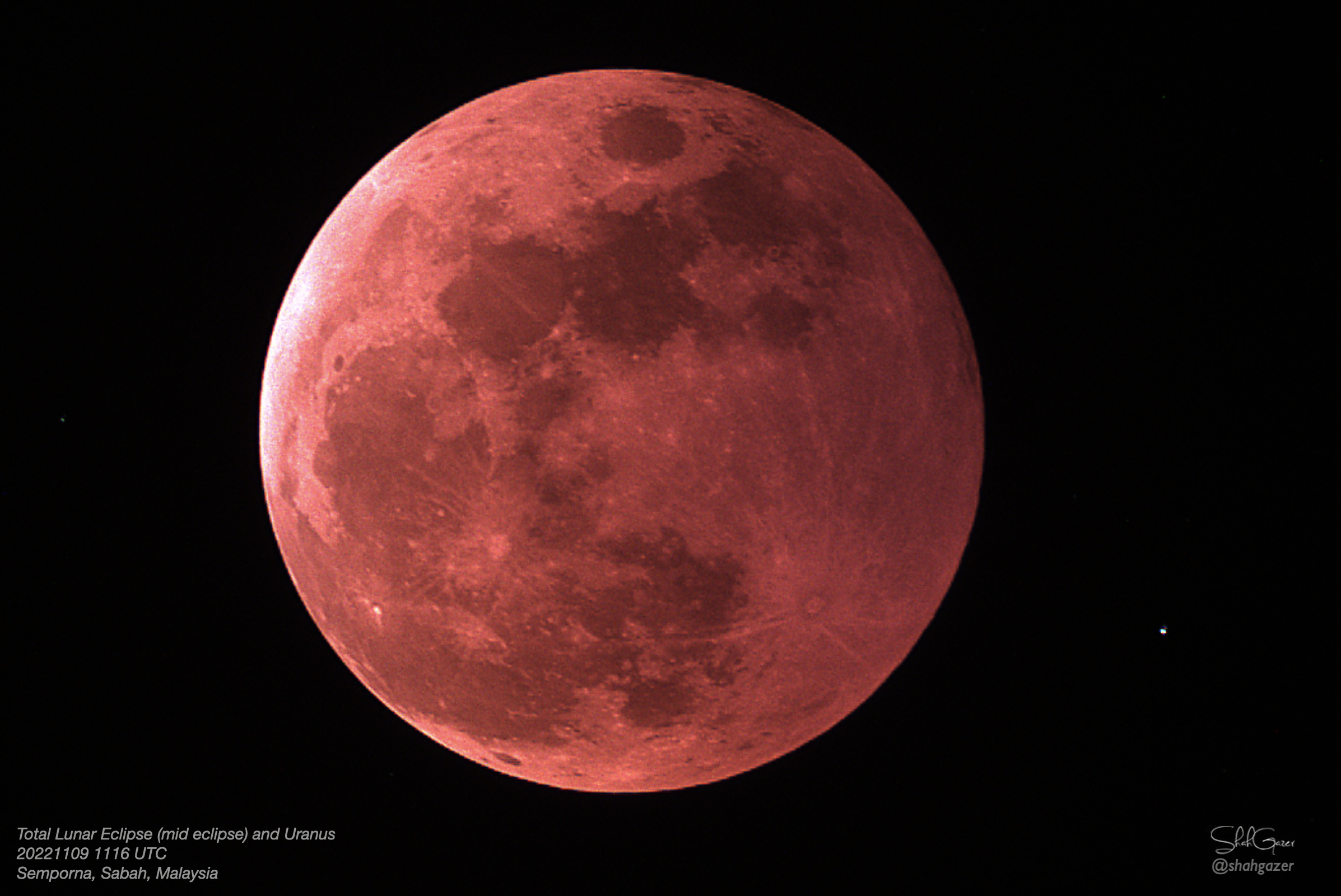
Semporna, Malaysia, 11:16 UTC, with Uranus at the right

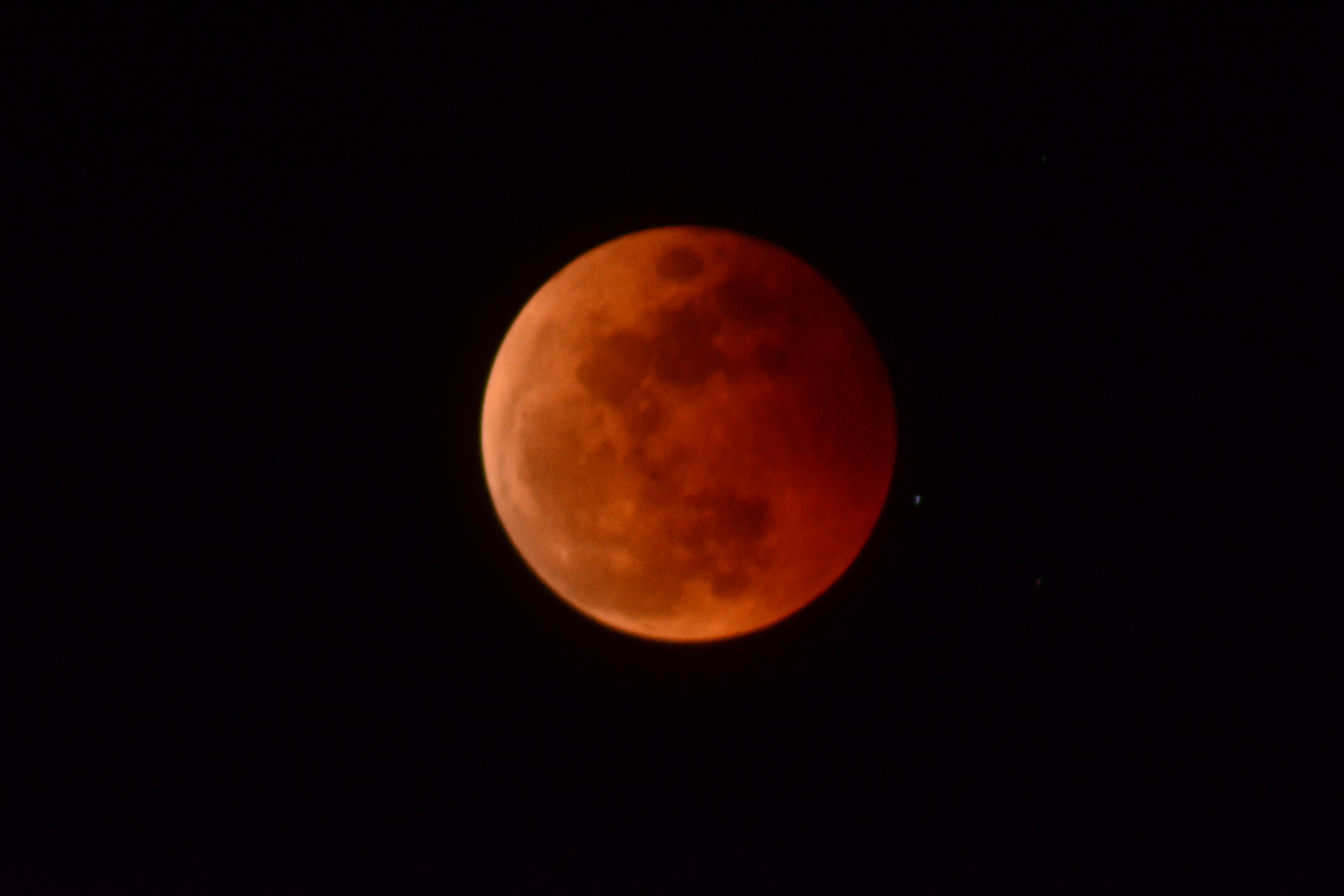
Laguna, Philippines, 11:35 UTC

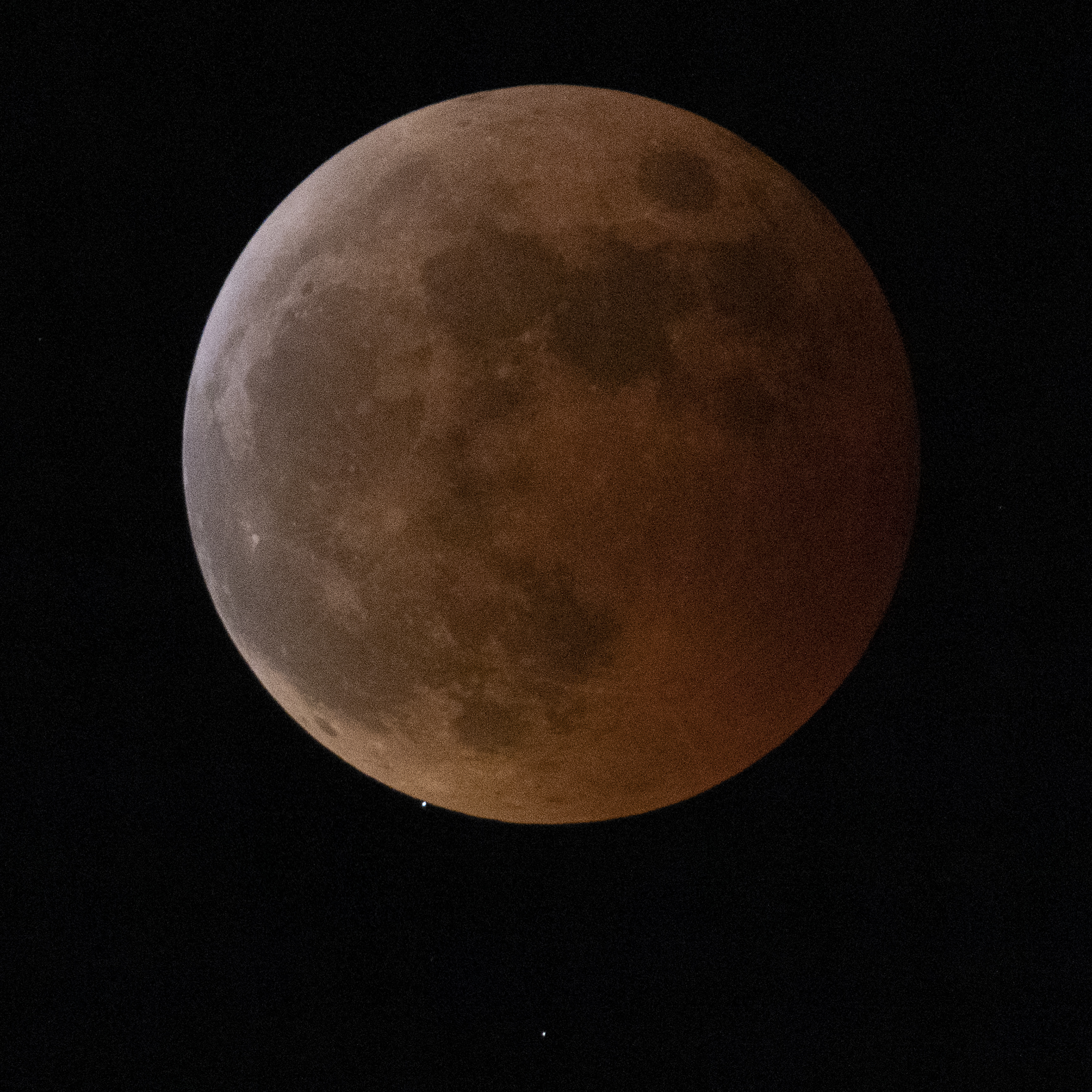
Takamatsu, Kagawa, 11:41 UTC

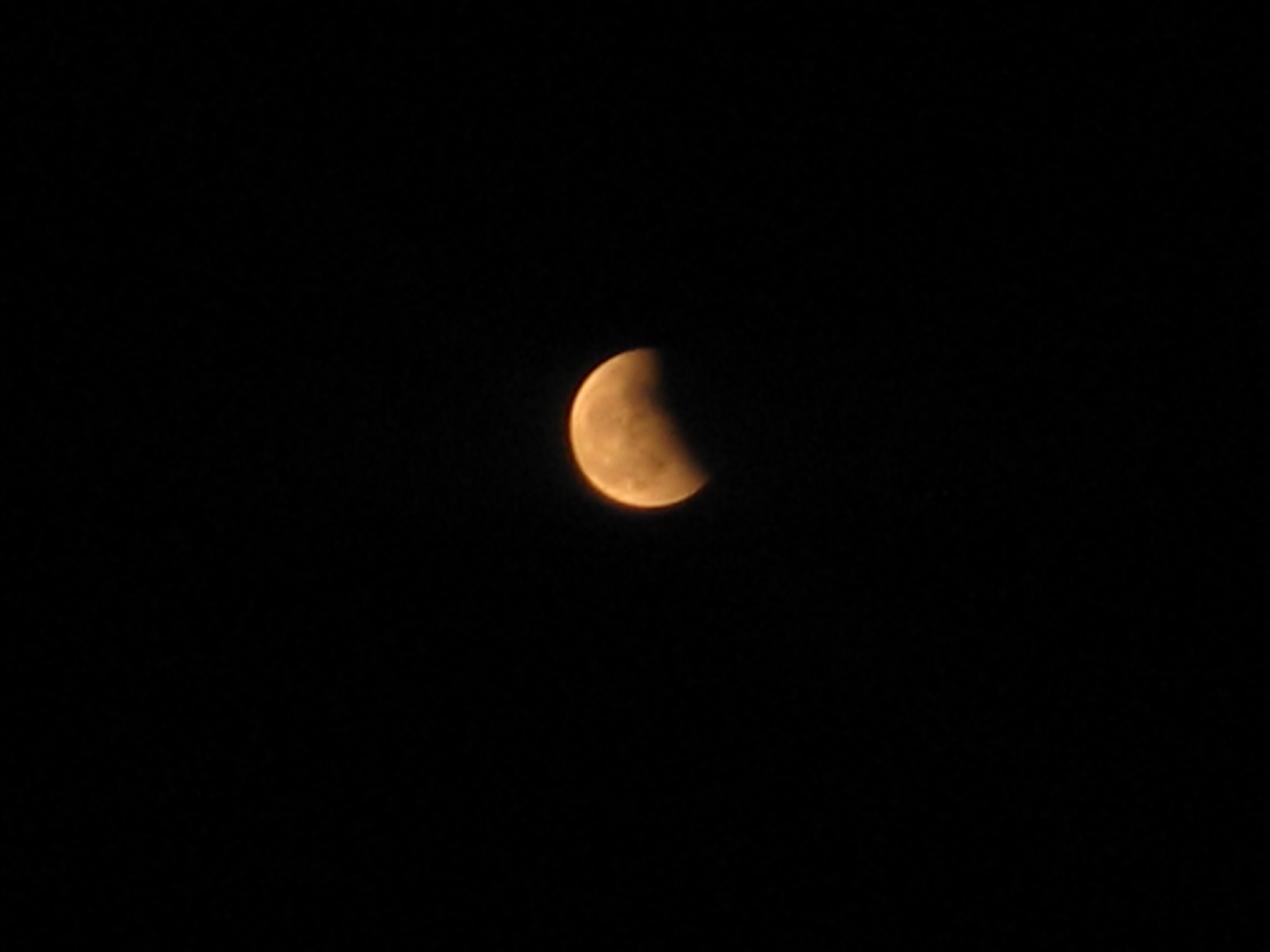
Partial from Hefei, China, 12:31 UTC

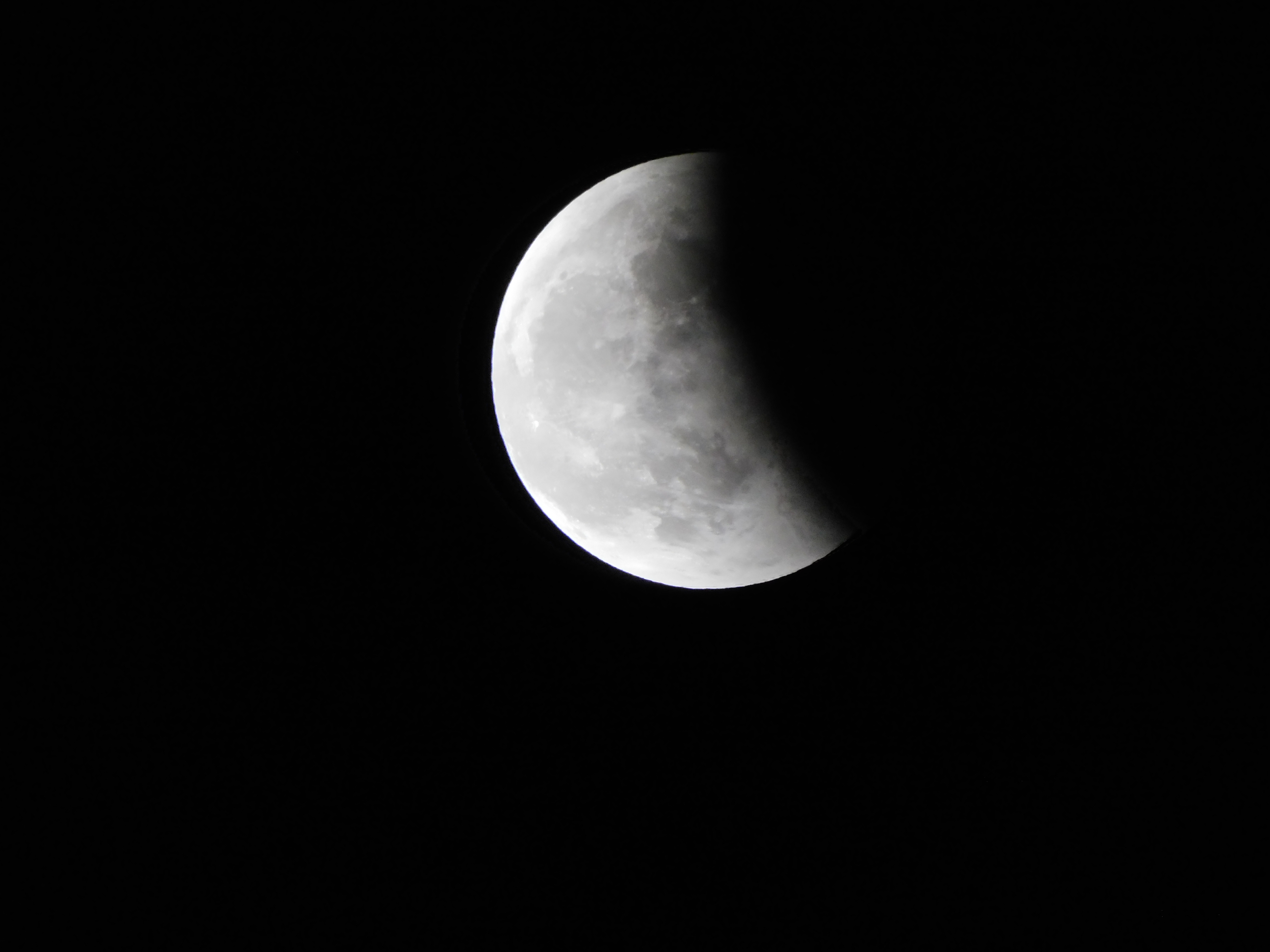
Partial from Utsunomiya, Tochigi, 12:32 UTC

== Eclipse details ==
Shown below is a table displaying details about this particular solar eclipse. It describes various parameters pertaining to this eclipse.

November 8, 2022 Lunar Eclipse Parameters
Parameter	Value
Penumbral Magnitude	2.41615
Umbral Magnitude	1.36069
Gamma	0.25703
Sun Right Ascension	14^{h} 54^{m} 11.2^{s}
Sun Declination	−16° 37′ 47.0″
Sun Semi-Diameter	16′ 08.5″
Sun Equatorial Horizontal Parallax	08.9″
Moon Right Ascension	02^{h} 53^{m} 48.1^{s}
Moon Declination	+16° 51′ 06.7″
Moon Semi-Diameter	15′ 17.7″
Moon Equatorial Horizontal Parallax	0° 56′ 07.8″
ΔT	69.2 s

== Eclipse season ==
This eclipse is part of an eclipse season, a period, roughly every six months, when eclipses occur. Only two (or occasionally three) eclipse seasons occur each year, and each season lasts about 35 days and repeats just short of six months (173 days) later; thus two full eclipse seasons always occur each year. Either two or three eclipses happen each eclipse season. In the sequence below, each eclipse is separated by a fortnight.

Eclipse season of October–November 2022
October 25 Descending node (new moon)	November 8 Ascending node (full moon)
Partial solar eclipse Solar Saros 124	Total lunar eclipse Lunar Saros 136

== Related eclipses ==
=== Eclipses in 2022 ===
- A partial solar eclipse on April 30.
- A total lunar eclipse on May 16.
- A partial solar eclipse on October 25.
- A total lunar eclipse on November 8.

=== Metonic ===
- Preceded by: Lunar eclipse of January 21, 2019
- Followed by: Lunar eclipse of August 28, 2026

=== Tzolkinex ===
- Preceded by: Lunar eclipse of September 28, 2015
- Followed by: Lunar eclipse of December 20, 2029

=== Half-Saros ===
- Preceded by: Solar eclipse of November 3, 2013
- Followed by: Solar eclipse of November 14, 2031

=== Tritos ===
- Preceded by: Lunar eclipse of December 10, 2011
- Followed by: Lunar eclipse of October 8, 2033

=== Lunar Saros 136 ===
- Preceded by: Lunar eclipse of October 28, 2004
- Followed by: Lunar eclipse of November 18, 2040

=== Inex ===
- Preceded by: Lunar eclipse of November 29, 1993
- Followed by: Lunar eclipse of October 19, 2051

=== Triad ===
- Preceded by: Lunar eclipse of January 8, 1936
- Followed by: Lunar eclipse of September 9, 2109

=== Lunar eclipses of 2020–2023 ===
This eclipse is a member of a semester series. An eclipse in a semester series of lunar eclipses repeats approximately every 177 days and 4 hours (a semester) at alternating nodes of the Moon's orbit.

The penumbral lunar eclipses on January 10, 2020 and July 5, 2020 occur in the previous lunar year eclipse set.

Lunar eclipse series sets from 2020 to 2023
Descending node				Ascending node			
Saros	Date Viewing	Type Chart	Gamma	Saros	Date Viewing	Type Chart	Gamma
111	2020 Jun 05	Penumbral	1.2406	116	2020 Nov 30	Penumbral	−1.1309
121	2021 May 26	Total	0.4774	126	2021 Nov 19	Partial	−0.4553
131	2022 May 16	Total	−0.2532	136	2022 Nov 08	Total	0.2570
141	2023 May 05	Penumbral	−1.0350	146	2023 Oct 28	Partial	0.9472

=== Metonic series ===
The Metonic cycle repeats nearly exactly every 19 years and represents a Saros cycle plus one lunar year. Because it occurs on the same calendar date, the Earth's shadow will be in nearly the same location relative to the background stars.

1. 1984 May 15.19 - penumbral (111); 2. 2003 May 16.15 - total (121); 3. 2022 May 16.17 - total (131); 4. 2041 May 16.03 - penumbral (141)	1. 1984 Nov 08.75 - penumbral (116); 2. 2003 Nov 09.05 - total (126); 3. 2022 Nov 08.46 - total (136); 4. 2041 Nov 08.19 - partial (146); 5. 2060 Nov 08.17 - penumbral (156)

=== Saros 136 ===
This eclipse is a part of Saros series 136, repeating every 18 years, 11 days, and containing 72 events. The series started with a penumbral lunar eclipse on April 13, 1680. It contains partial eclipses from July 11, 1824 through September 14, 1932; total eclipses from September 26, 1950 through July 7, 2419; and a second set of partial eclipses from July 18, 2437 through October 3, 2563. The series ends at member 72 as a penumbral eclipse on June 1, 2960.

The longest duration of totality will be produced by member 35 at 101 minutes, 23 seconds on April 21, 2293. All eclipses in this series occur at the Moon’s ascending node of orbit.

Greatest	First			
The greatest eclipse of the series will occur on 2293 Apr 21, lasting 101 minutes, 23 seconds.	Penumbral	Partial	Total	Central
The greatest eclipse of the series will occur on 2293 Apr 21, lasting 101 minutes, 23 seconds.	1680 Apr 13	1824 Jul 11	1950 Sep 26	2022 Nov 08
The greatest eclipse of the series will occur on 2293 Apr 21, lasting 101 minutes, 23 seconds.	Last			
The greatest eclipse of the series will occur on 2293 Apr 21, lasting 101 minutes, 23 seconds.	Central	Total	Partial	Penumbral
The greatest eclipse of the series will occur on 2293 Apr 21, lasting 101 minutes, 23 seconds.	2365 Jun 04	2419 Jul 07	2563 Oct 03	2960 Jun 01

Eclipses are tabulated in three columns; every third eclipse in the same column is one exeligmos apart, so they all cast shadows over approximately the same parts of the Earth.

Series members 8–29 occur between 1801 and 2200:
8	9	10
1806 Jun 30	1824 Jul 11	1842 Jul 22
11	12	13
1860 Aug 01	1878 Aug 13	1896 Aug 23
14	15	16
1914 Sep 04	1932 Sep 14	1950 Sep 26
17	18	19
1968 Oct 06	1986 Oct 17	2004 Oct 28
20	21	22
2022 Nov 08	2040 Nov 18	2058 Nov 30
23	24	25
2076 Dec 10	2094 Dec 21	2113 Jan 02
26	27	28
2131 Jan 13	2149 Jan 23	2167 Feb 04
29
2185 Feb 14

=== Tritos series ===
This eclipse is a part of a tritos cycle, repeating at alternating nodes every 135 synodic months (≈ 3986.63 days, or 11 years minus 1 month). Their appearance and longitude are irregular due to a lack of synchronization with the anomalistic month (period of perigee), but groupings of 3 tritos cycles (≈ 33 years minus 3 months) come close (≈ 434.044 anomalistic months), so eclipses are similar in these groupings.

Series members between 1801 and 2200
1804 Jul 22 (Saros 116)	1815 Jun 21 (Saros 117)	1826 May 21 (Saros 118)	1837 Apr 20 (Saros 119)	1848 Mar 19 (Saros 120)
1859 Feb 17 (Saros 121)	1870 Jan 17 (Saros 122)	1880 Dec 16 (Saros 123)	1891 Nov 16 (Saros 124)	1902 Oct 17 (Saros 125)
1913 Sep 15 (Saros 126)	1924 Aug 14 (Saros 127)	1935 Jul 16 (Saros 128)	1946 Jun 14 (Saros 129)	1957 May 13 (Saros 130)
1968 Apr 13 (Saros 131)	1979 Mar 13 (Saros 132)	1990 Feb 09 (Saros 133)	2001 Jan 09 (Saros 134)	2011 Dec 10 (Saros 135)
2022 Nov 08 (Saros 136)	2033 Oct 08 (Saros 137)	2044 Sep 07 (Saros 138)	2055 Aug 07 (Saros 139)	2066 Jul 07 (Saros 140)
2077 Jun 06 (Saros 141)	2088 May 05 (Saros 142)	2099 Apr 05 (Saros 143)	2110 Mar 06 (Saros 144)	2121 Feb 02 (Saros 145)
2132 Jan 02 (Saros 146)	2142 Dec 03 (Saros 147)	2153 Nov 01 (Saros 148)	2164 Sep 30 (Saros 149)	2175 Aug 31 (Saros 150)
2186 Jul 31 (Saros 151)	2197 Jun 29 (Saros 152)			

=== Inex series ===
This eclipse is a part of the long period inex cycle, repeating at alternating nodes, every 358 synodic months (≈ 10,571.95 days, or 29 years minus 20 days). Their appearance and longitude are irregular due to a lack of synchronization with the anomalistic month (period of perigee). However, groupings of 3 inex cycles (≈ 87 years minus 2 months) comes close (≈ 1,151.02 anomalistic months), so eclipses are similar in these groupings.

Series members between 1801 and 2200
1820 Mar 29 (Saros 129)	1849 Mar 09 (Saros 130)	1878 Feb 17 (Saros 131)
1907 Jan 29 (Saros 132)	1936 Jan 08 (Saros 133)	1964 Dec 19 (Saros 134)
1993 Nov 29 (Saros 135)	2022 Nov 08 (Saros 136)	2051 Oct 19 (Saros 137)
2080 Sep 29 (Saros 138)	2109 Sep 09 (Saros 139)	2138 Aug 20 (Saros 140)
2167 Aug 01 (Saros 141)	2196 Jul 10 (Saros 142)	

=== Half-Saros cycle ===
A lunar eclipse will be preceded and followed by solar eclipses by 9 years and 5.5 days (a half saros). This lunar eclipse was related to two hybrid solar eclipses of Solar Saros 143.

November 3, 2013	November 14, 2031

== See also ==
- Lists of lunar eclipses and List of lunar eclipses in the 21st century
- November 2021 lunar eclipse
- December 2028 lunar eclipse
