= November 2021 lunar eclipse =

Partial lunar eclipse of 19 November 2021

- Partial eclipse
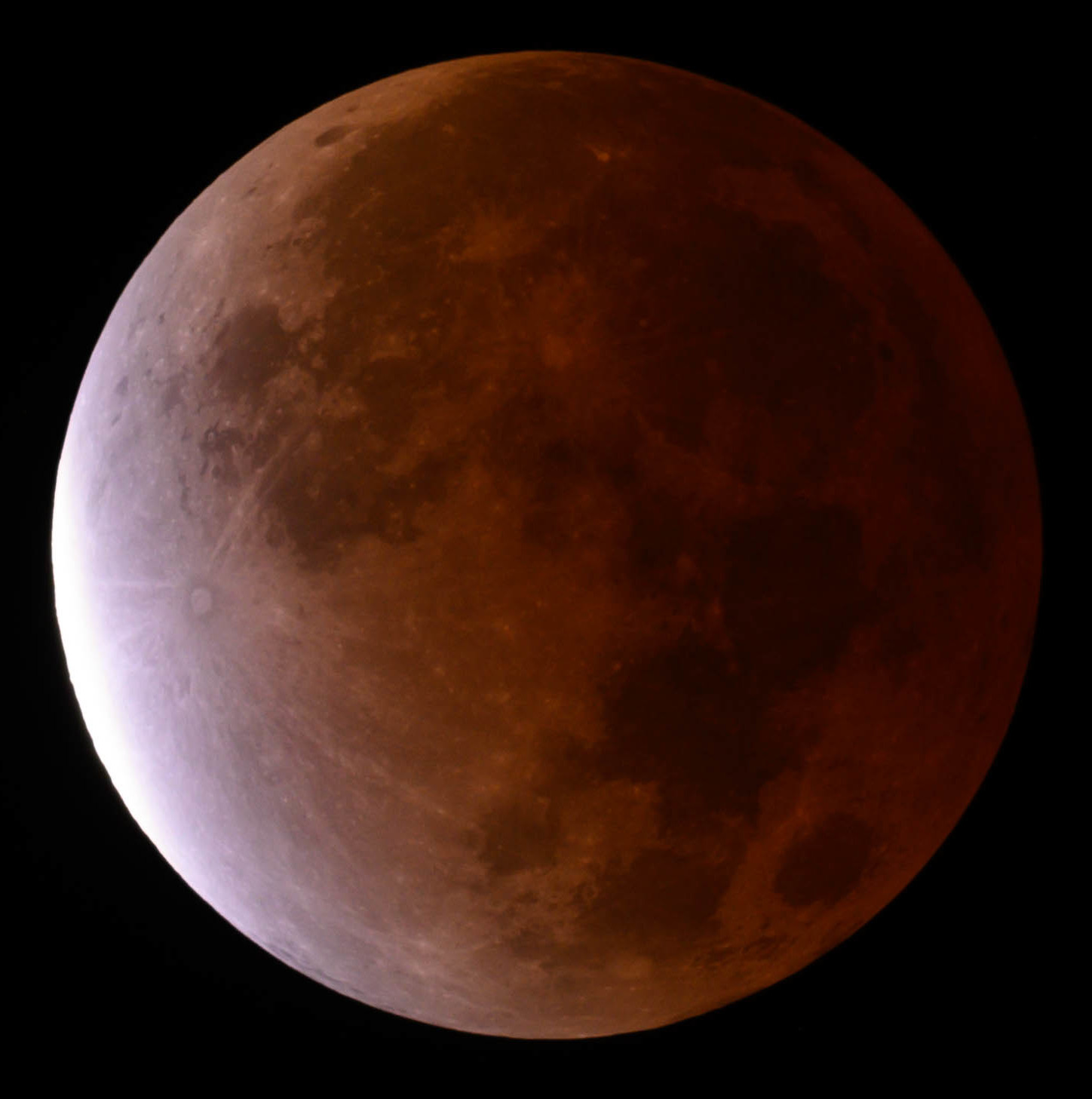
- Partiality as viewed from Starkville, Mississippi at maximum, 9:03 UTC
- Date: November 19, 2021
- Gamma: −0.4552
- Magnitude: 0.9760
- Saros cycle: 126 (45 of 70)
- Partiality: 209 minutes, 9 seconds
- Penumbral: 362 minutes, 21 seconds
Contacts (UTC)
- P1: 06:01:51
- U1: 07:18:27
- Greatest: 09:02:57
- U4: 10:47:37
- P4: 12:04:12

A partial lunar eclipse occurred at the Moon’s ascending node of orbit on Friday, November 19, 2021, with an umbral magnitude of 0.9760. A lunar eclipse occurs when the Moon moves into the Earth's shadow, causing the Moon to be darkened. A partial lunar eclipse occurs when one part of the Moon is in the Earth's umbra, while the other part is in the Earth's penumbra. Unlike a solar eclipse, which can only be viewed from a relatively small area of the world, a lunar eclipse may be viewed from anywhere on the night side of Earth. Occurring about 1.7 days before apogee (02:14 UTC, November 21), the Moon's apparent diameter was smaller than average.

This was the longest partial lunar eclipse since February 18, 1440, and the longest until February 8, 2669; however, many eclipses, including the November 2022 lunar eclipse, have a longer period of umbral contact at next to 3 hours 40 minutes.

This lunar eclipse was the second of an almost tetrad, with the others being on May 26, 2021 (total); May 16, 2022 (total); and November 8, 2022 (total).

== Visibility ==
The eclipse was completely visible over northeast Asia, the Pacific Ocean, and North America, seen rising over east Asia and Australia and setting over South America.

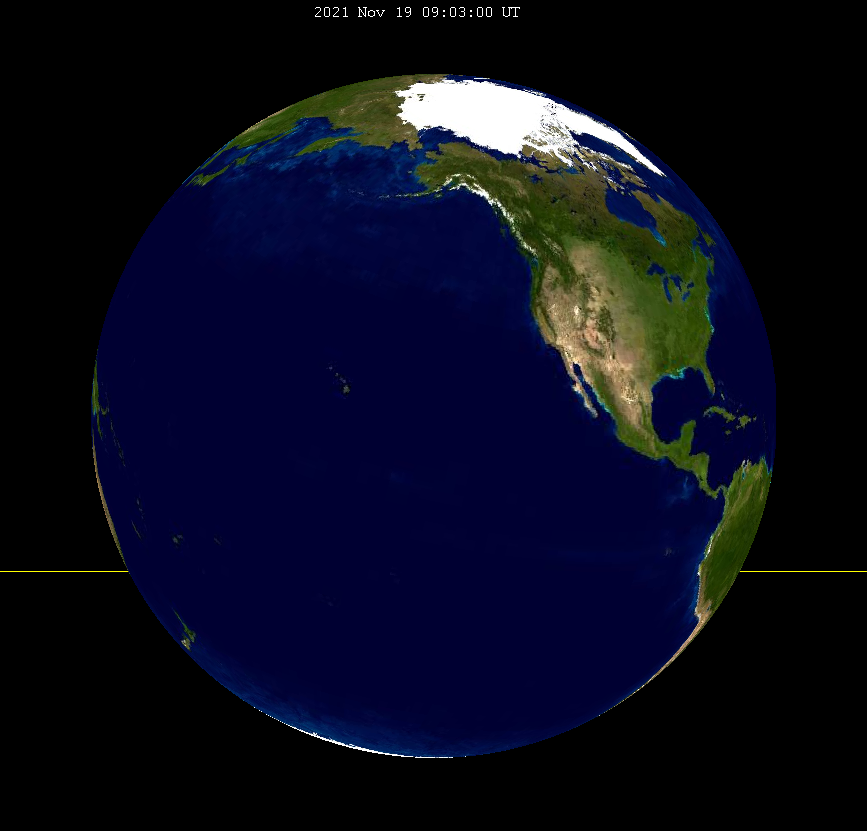
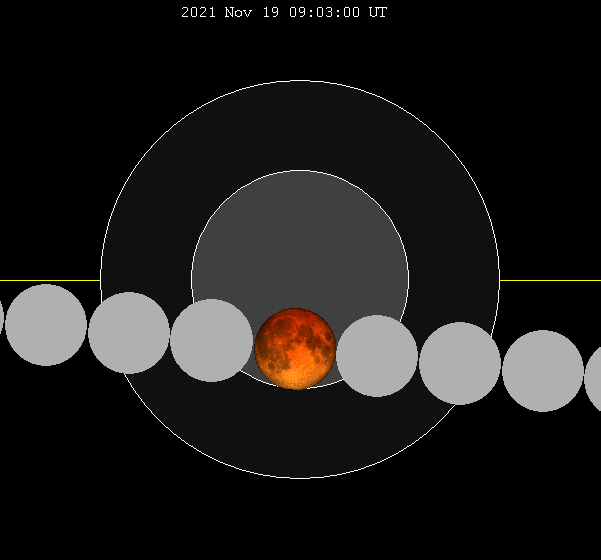
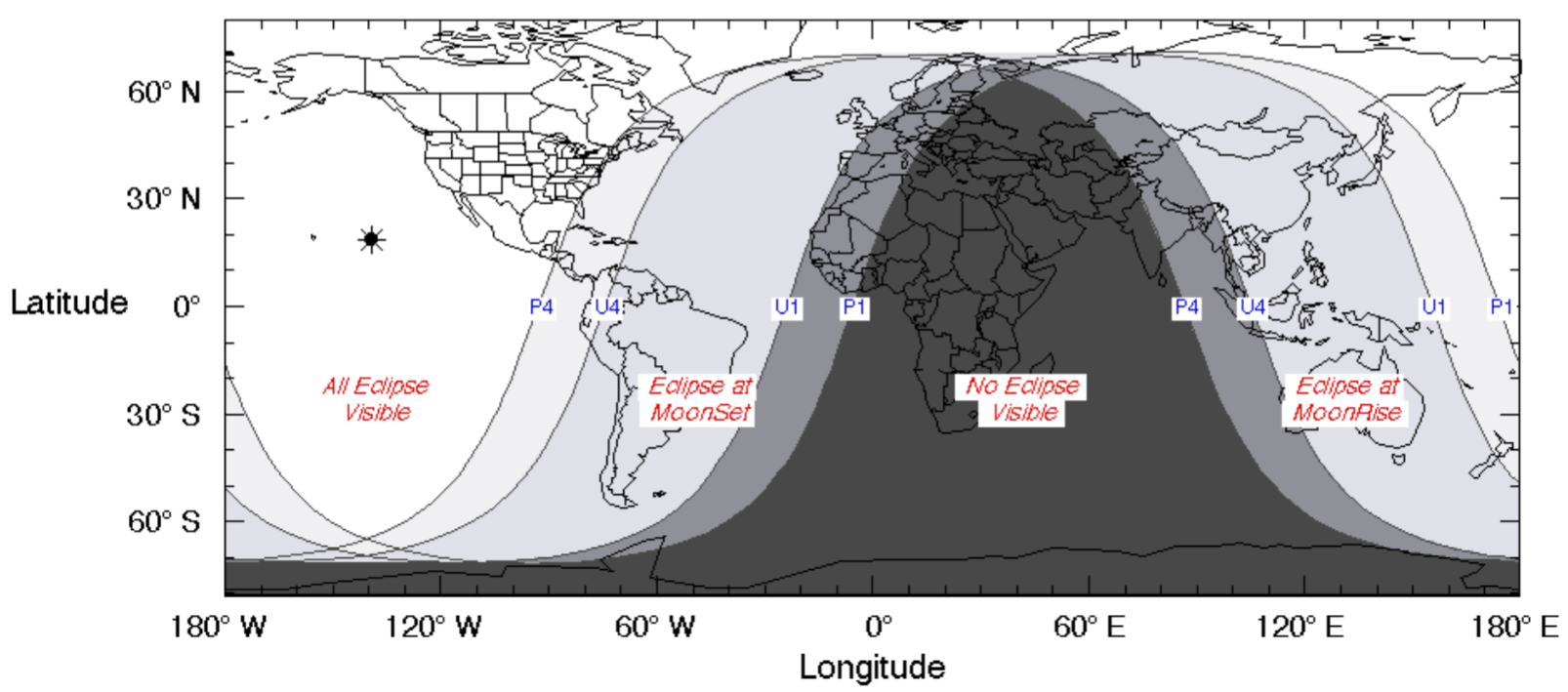
Visibility map

== Gallery ==
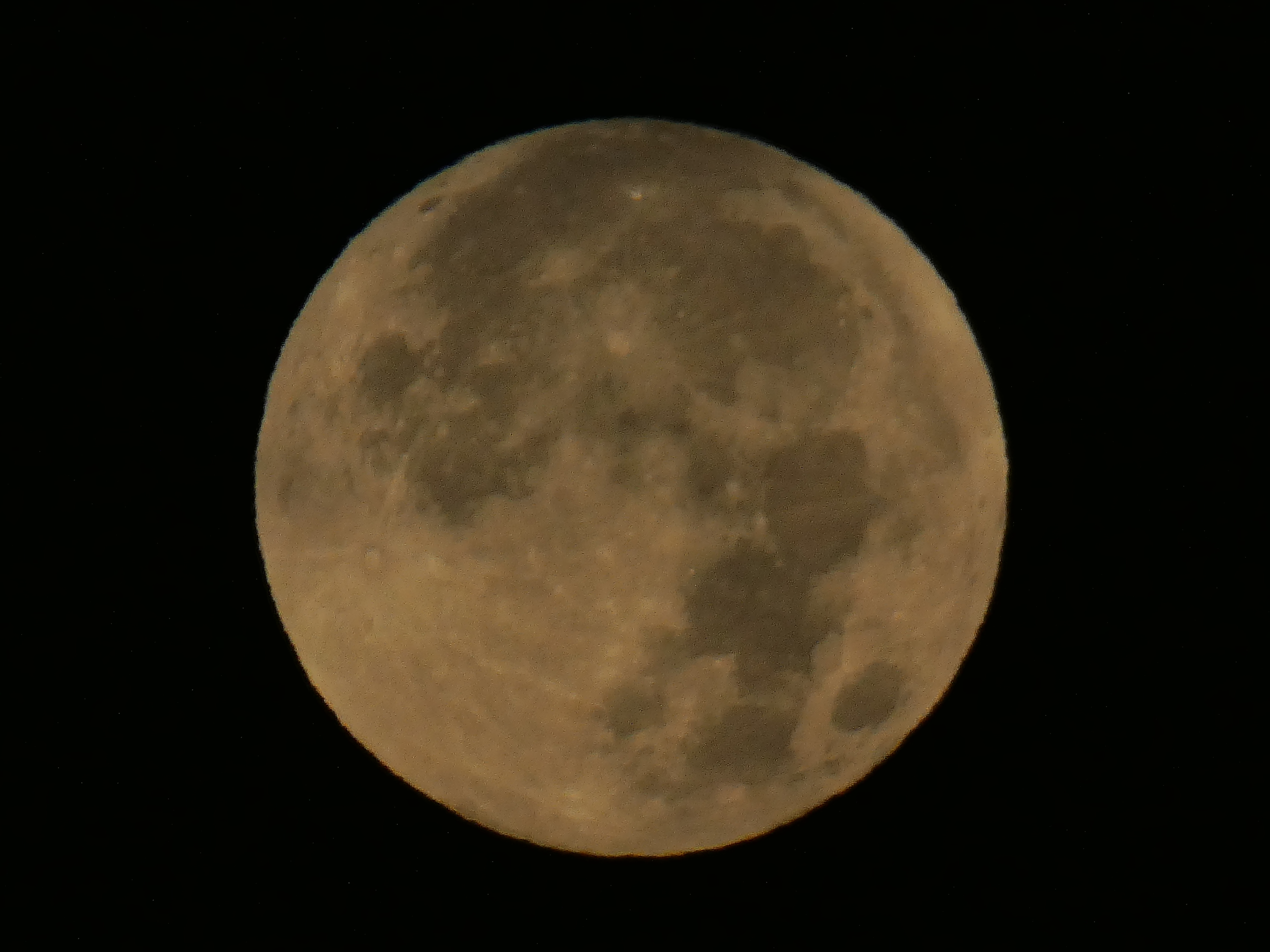
Madrid, Spain, 7:29 UTC

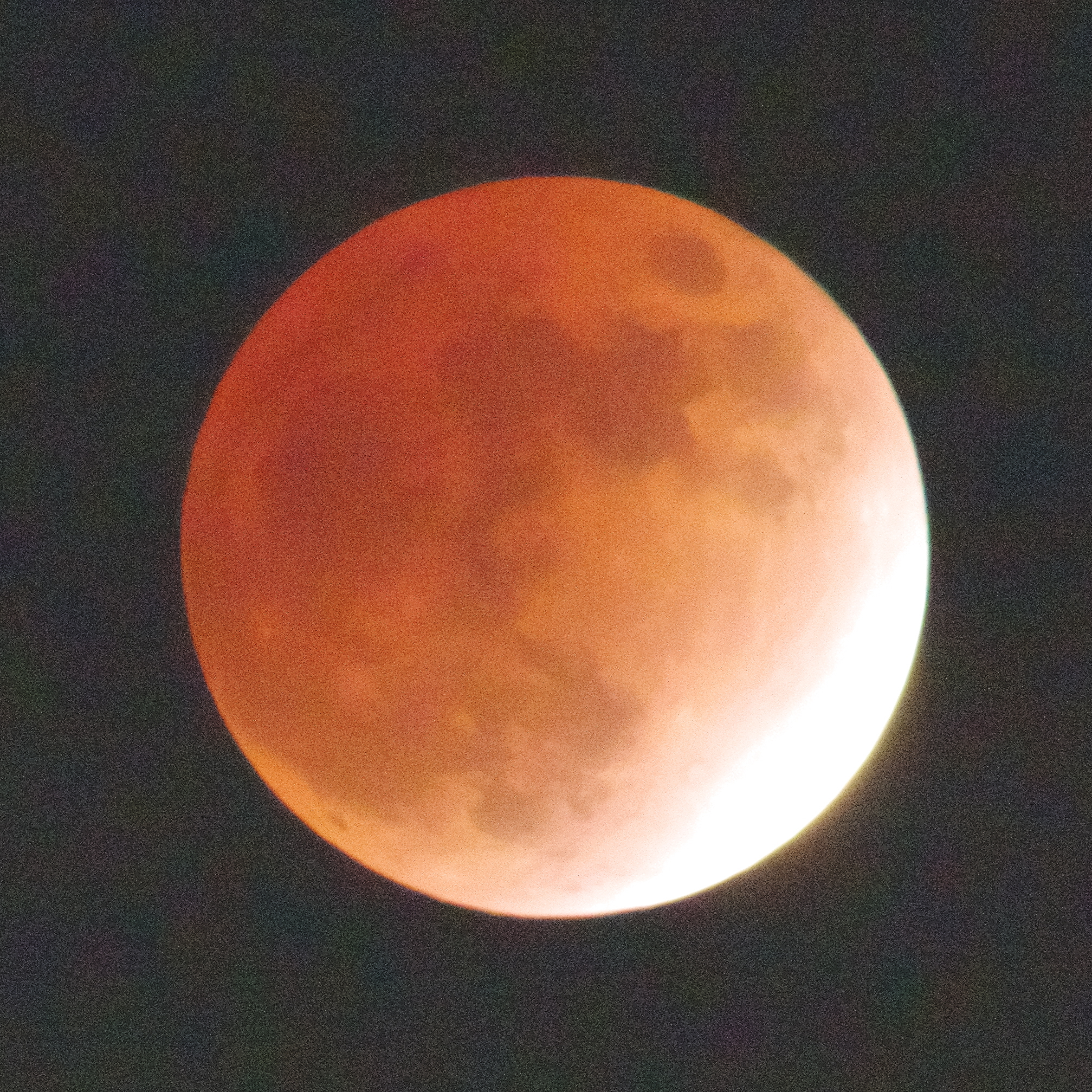
Nara, Nara, 8:51 UTC

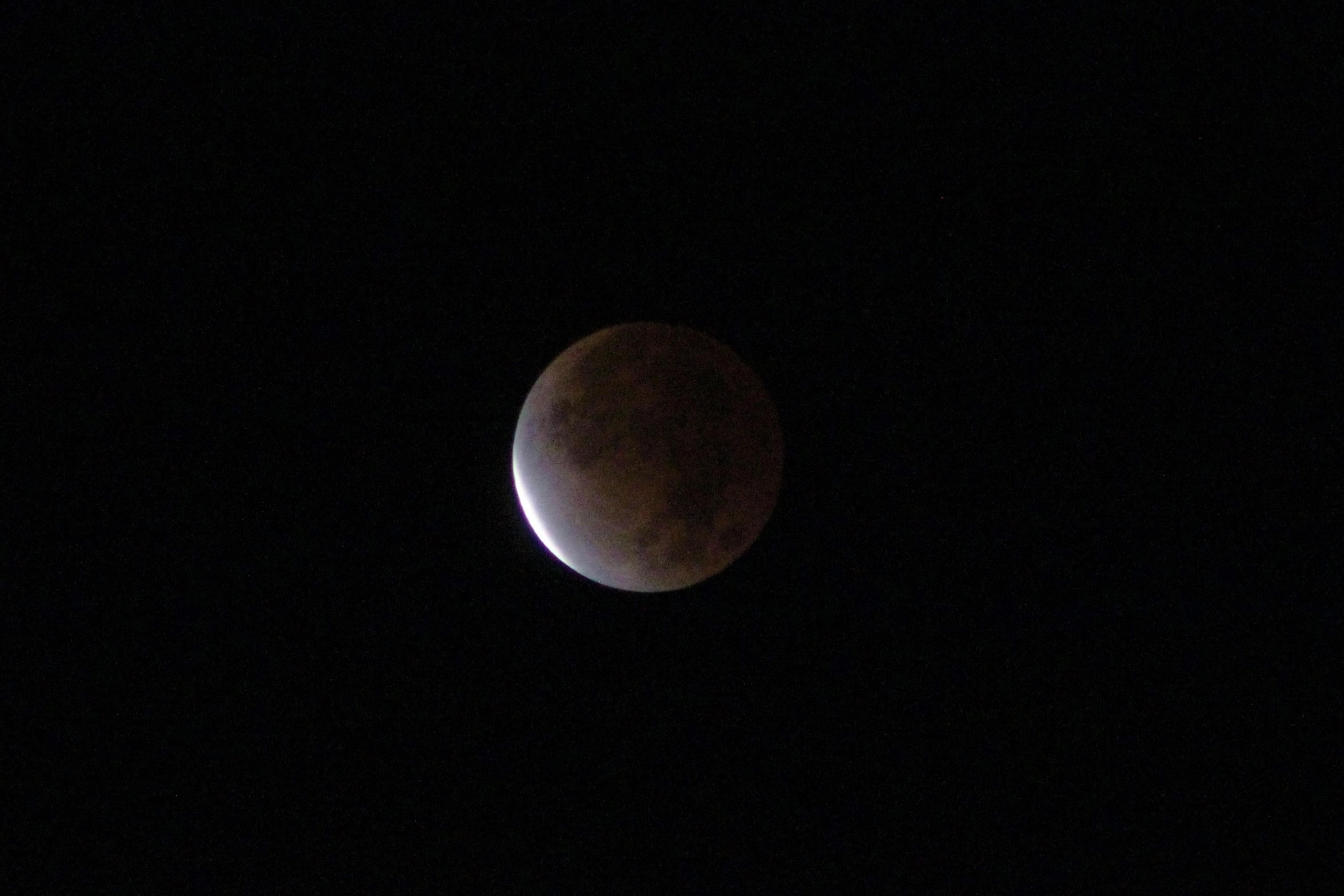
Toronto, Ontario, 8:53 UTC

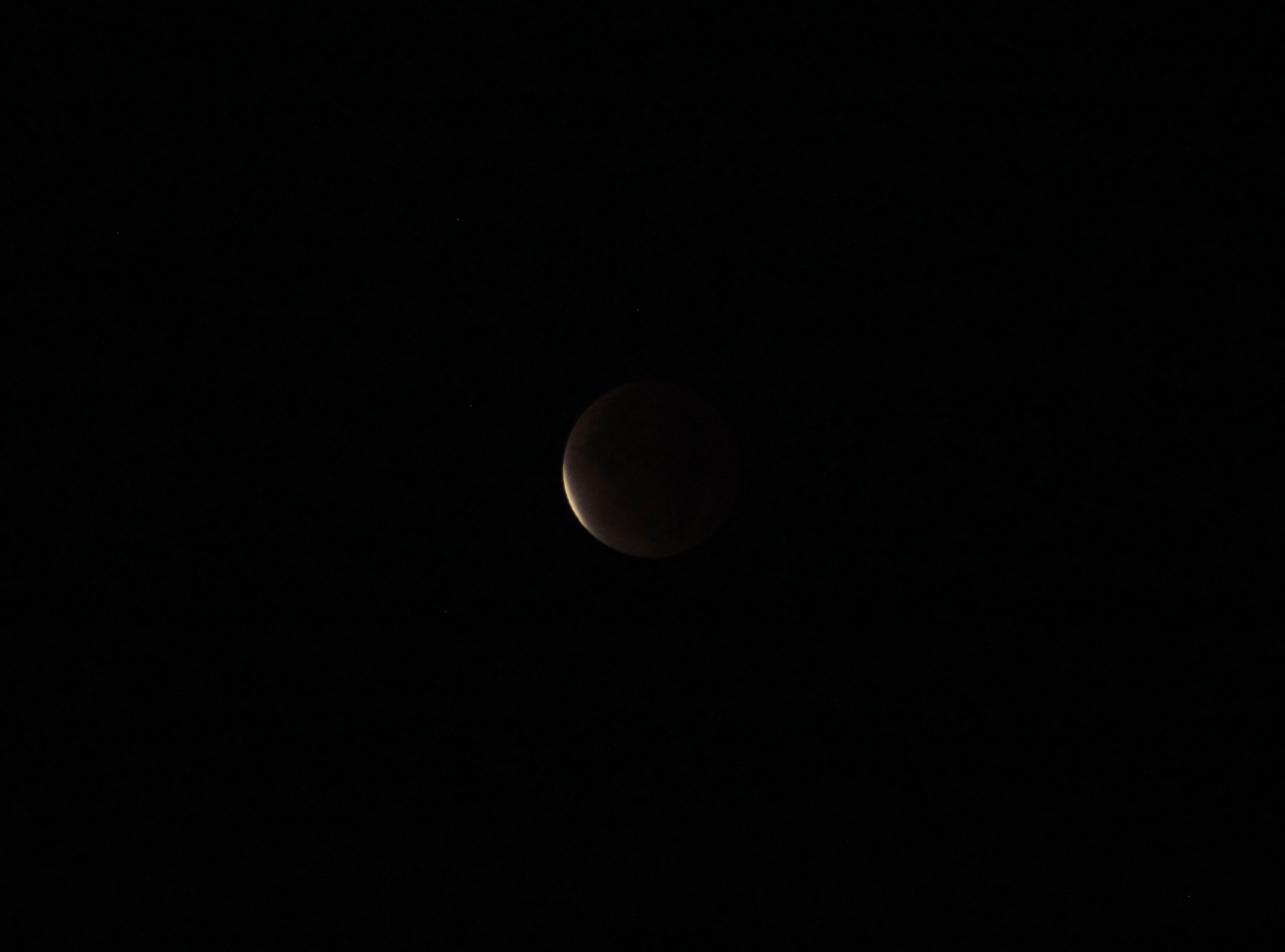
Warrenton, Virginia, 9:01 UTC

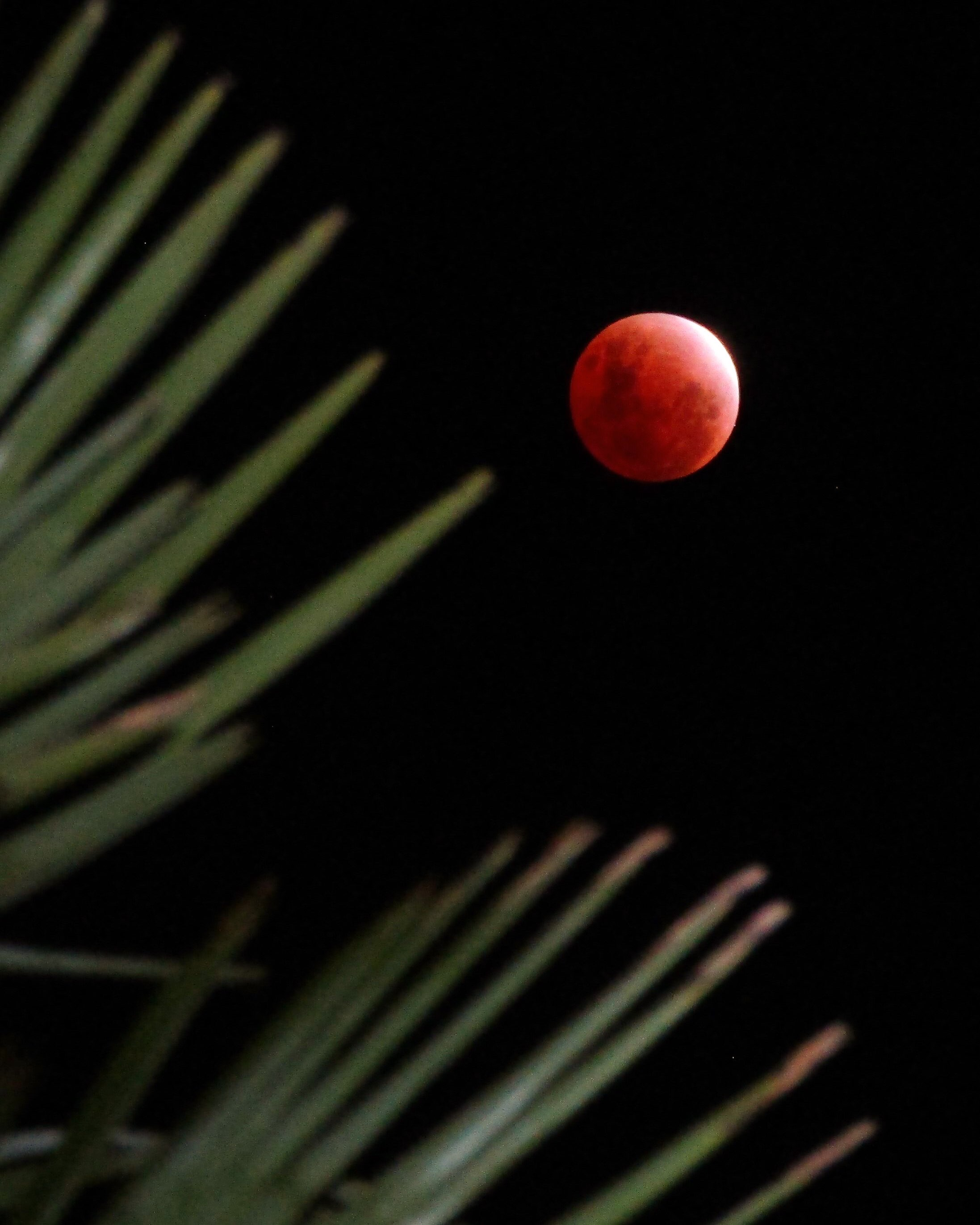
New Plymouth, New Zealand, 9:03 UTC

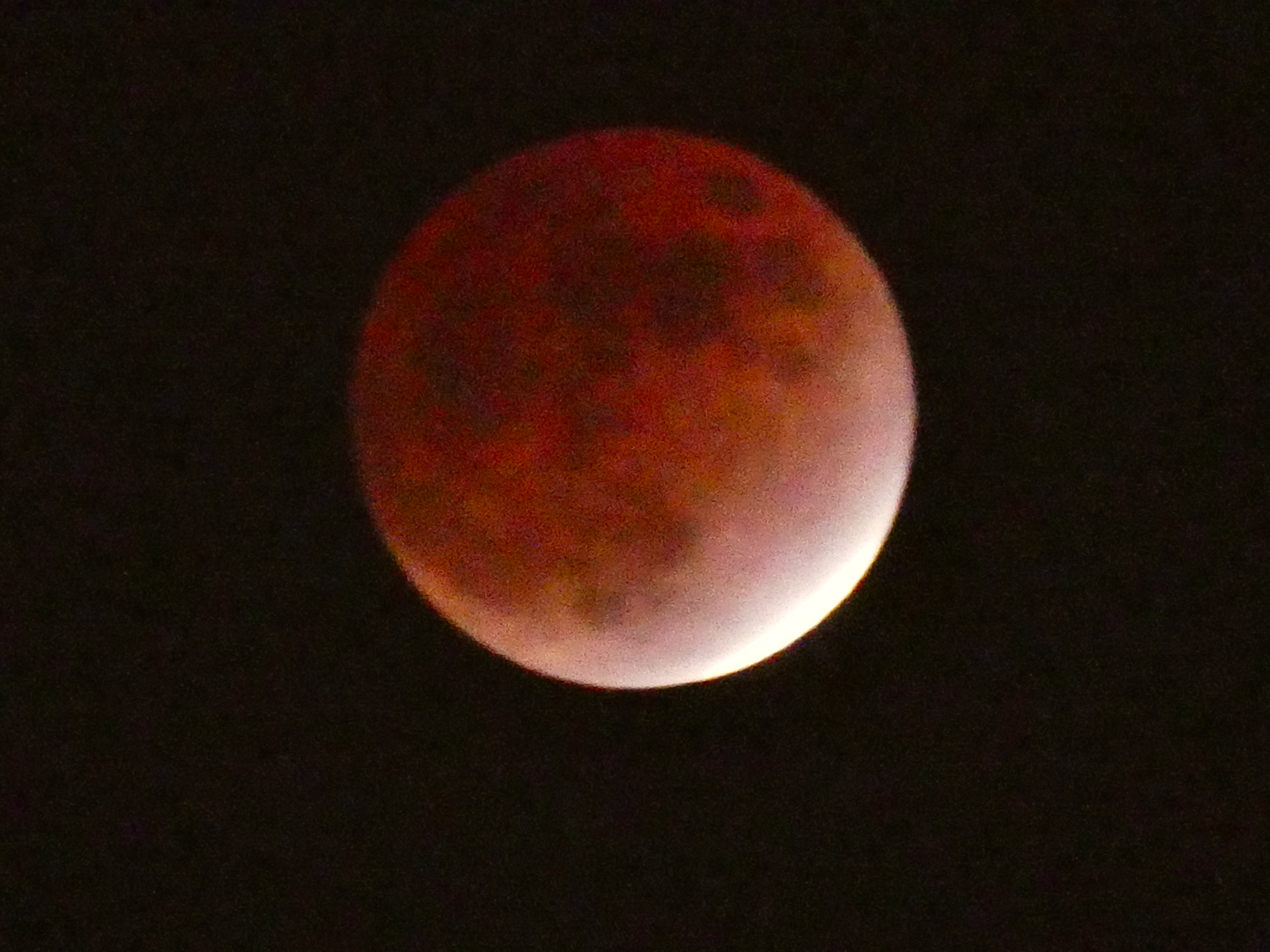
Komaki, Aichi, 9:04 UTC

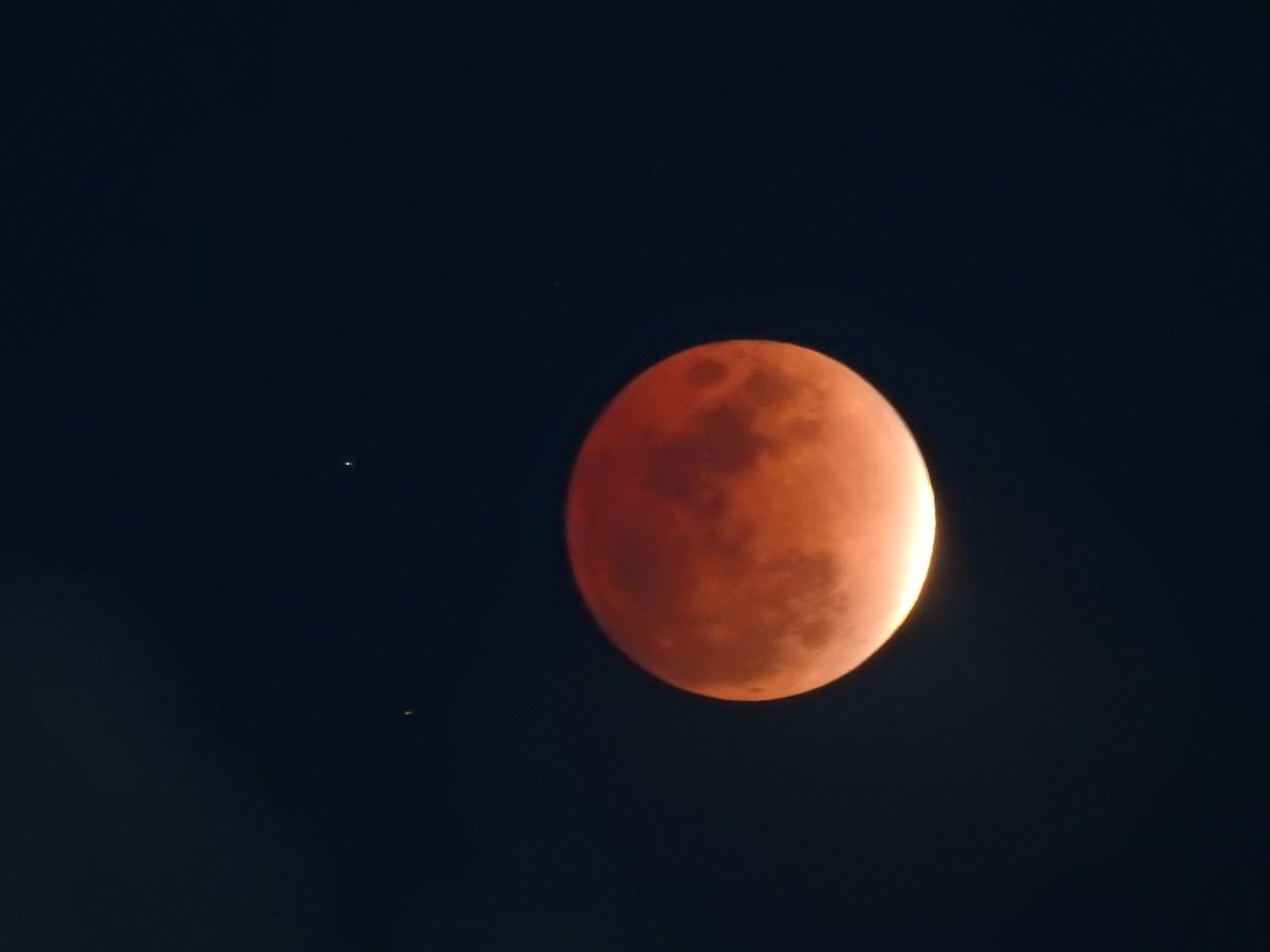
Jayapura, Indonesia, 9:04 UTC

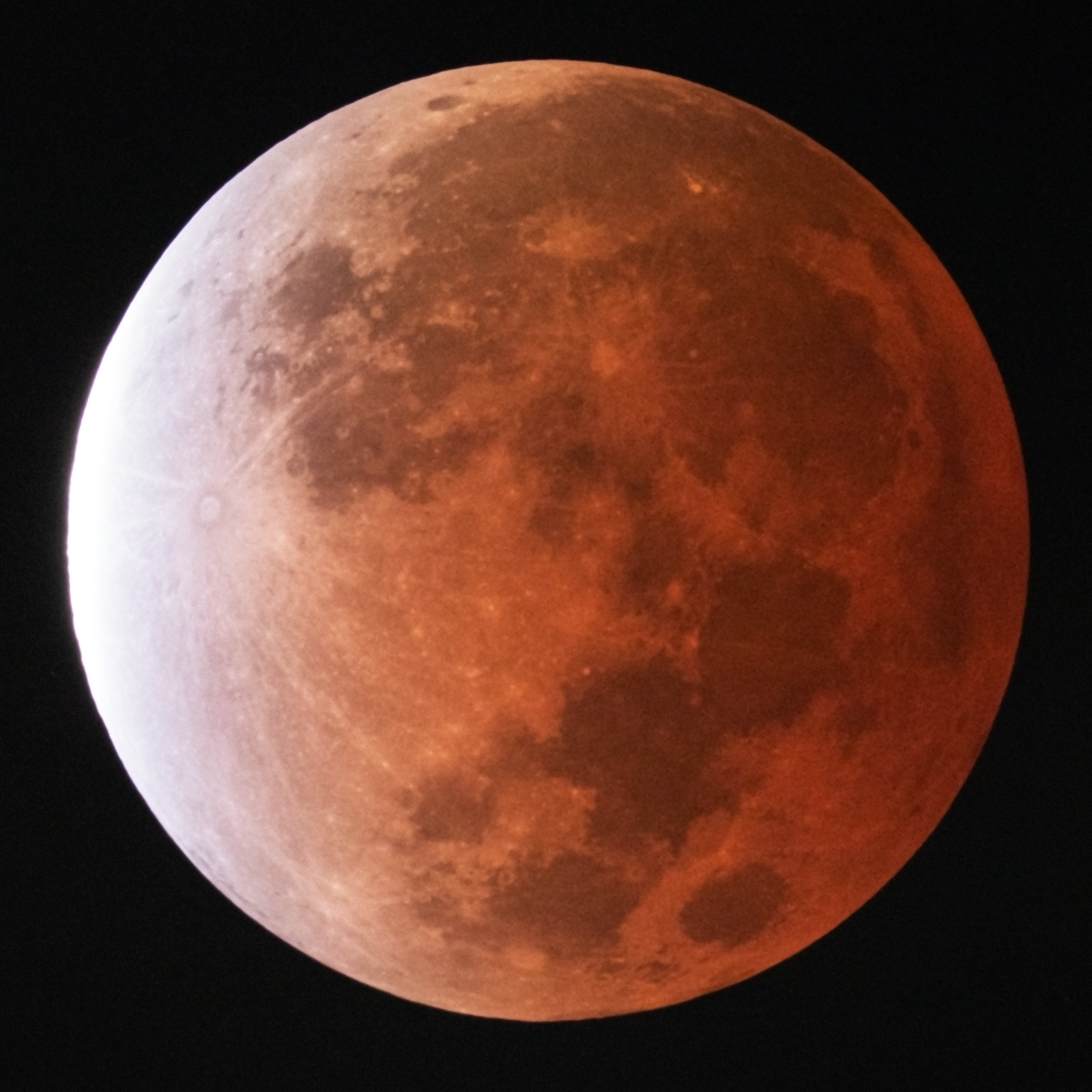
Mexico City, Mexico, 9:08 UTC

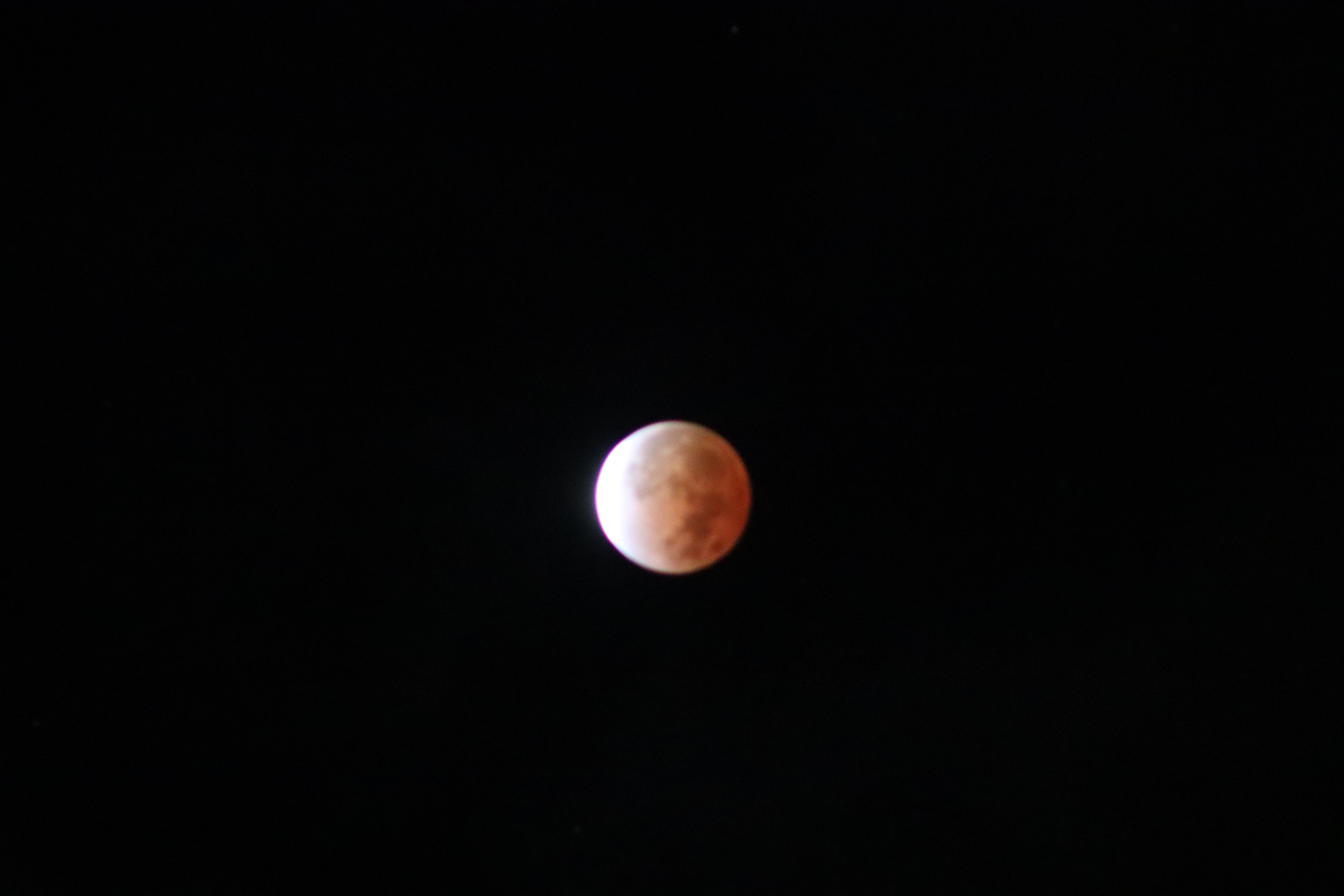
Englewood, Ohio, 9:09 UTC

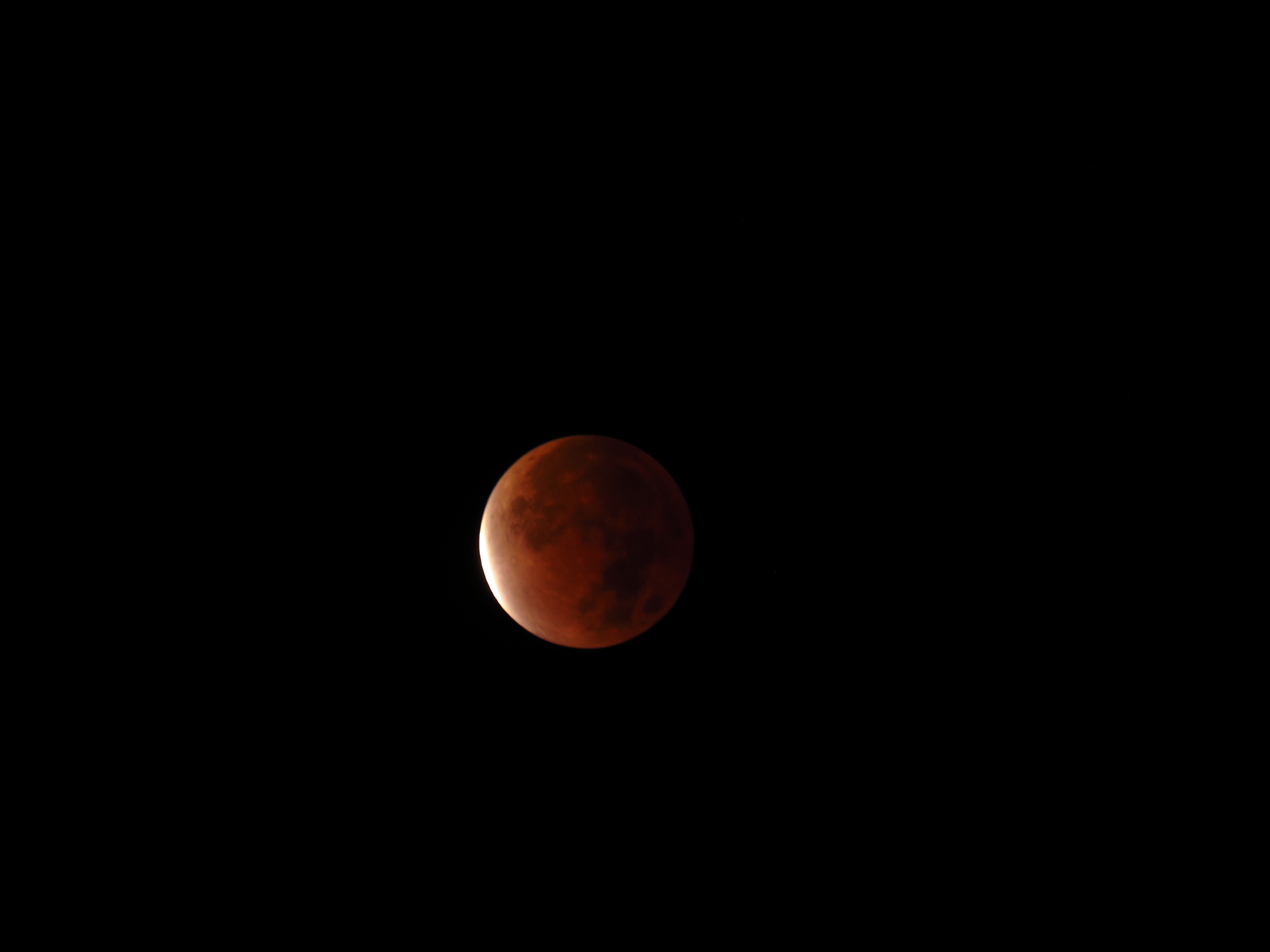
Killingly, Connecticut, 9:12 UTC

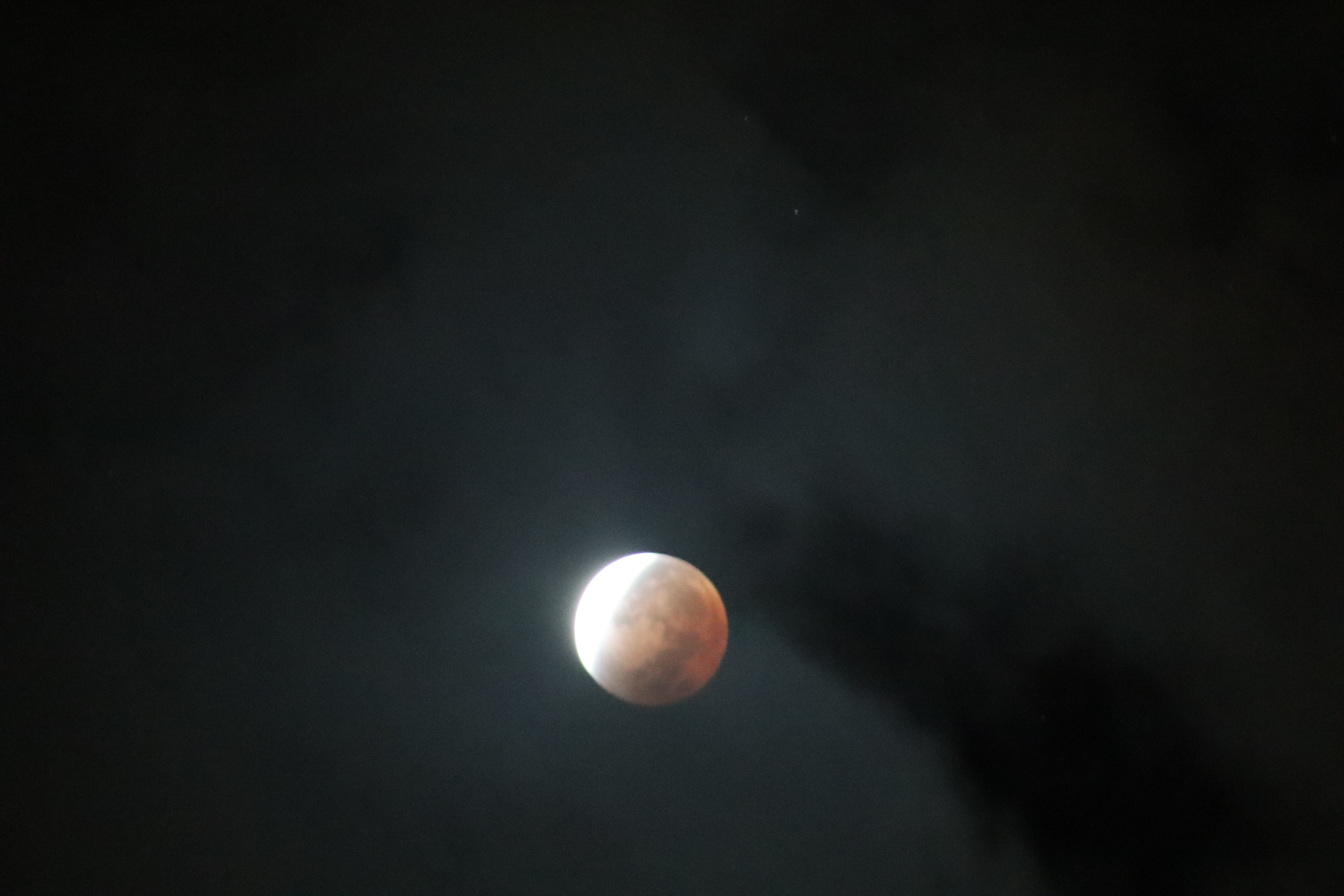
Dayton, Ohio, 9:25 UTC

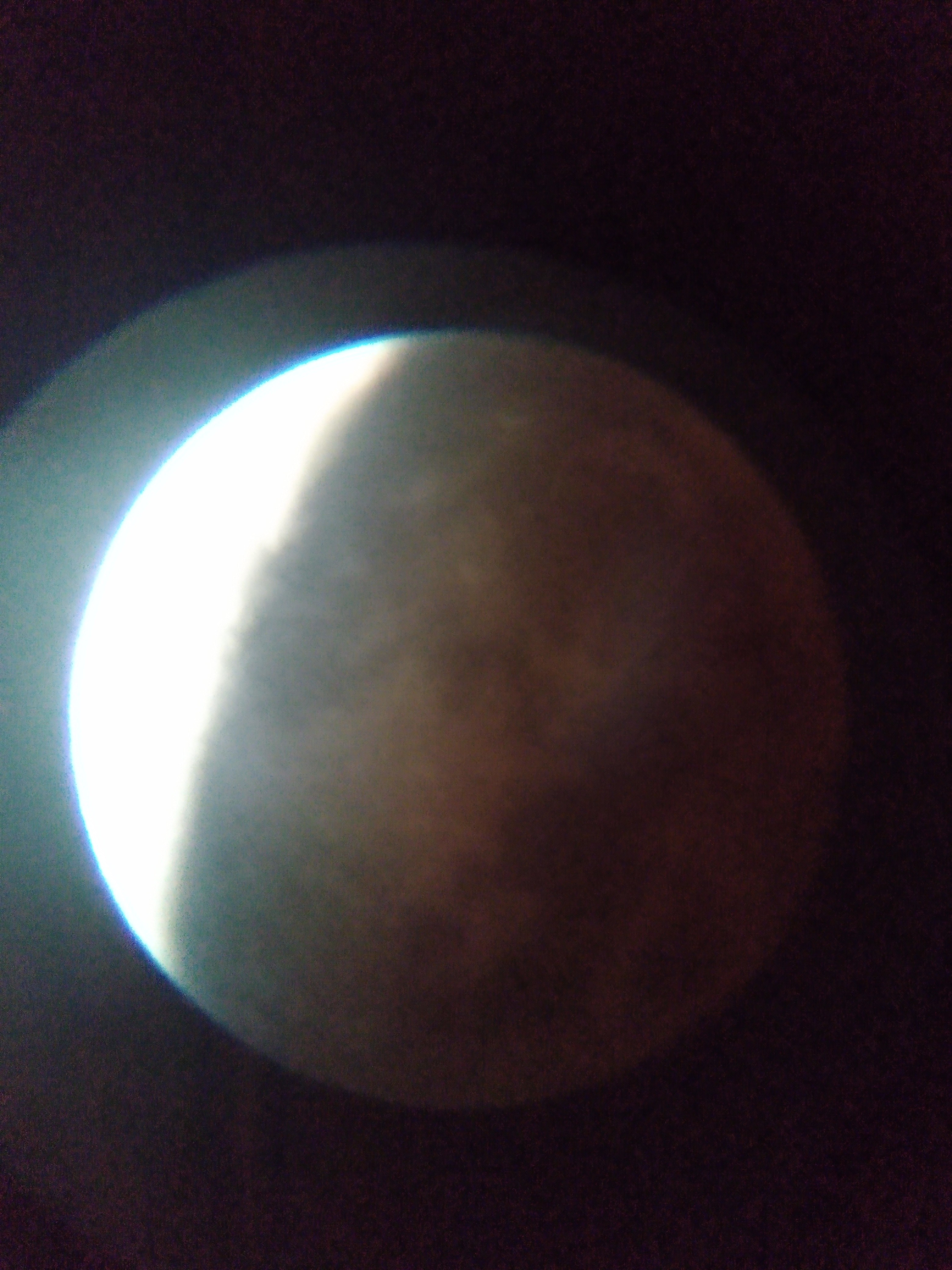
Mexicali, Mexico, 9:38 UTC

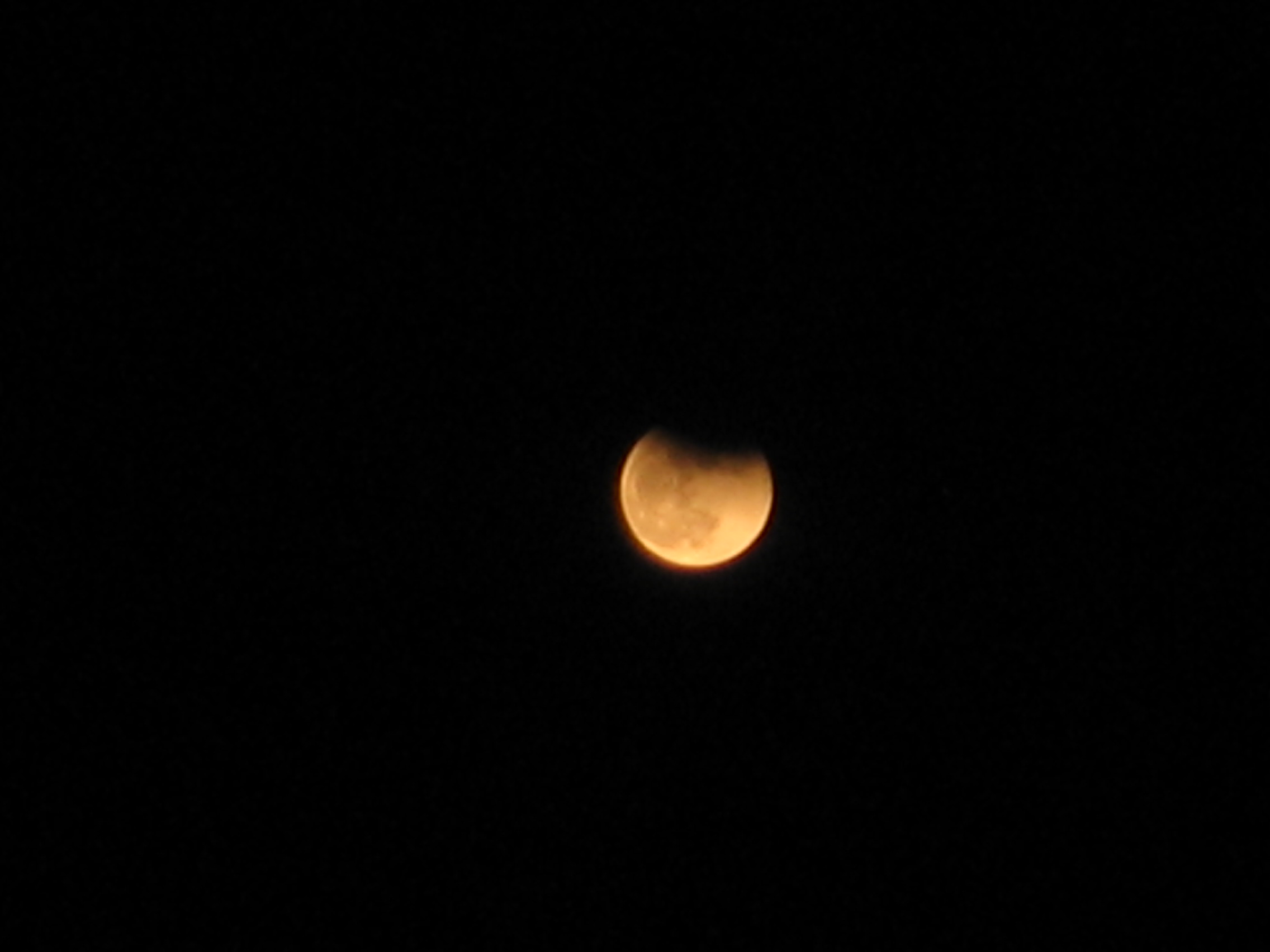
Hefei, China, 10:35 UTC

Weifang, China, taken began at 10:31 UTC

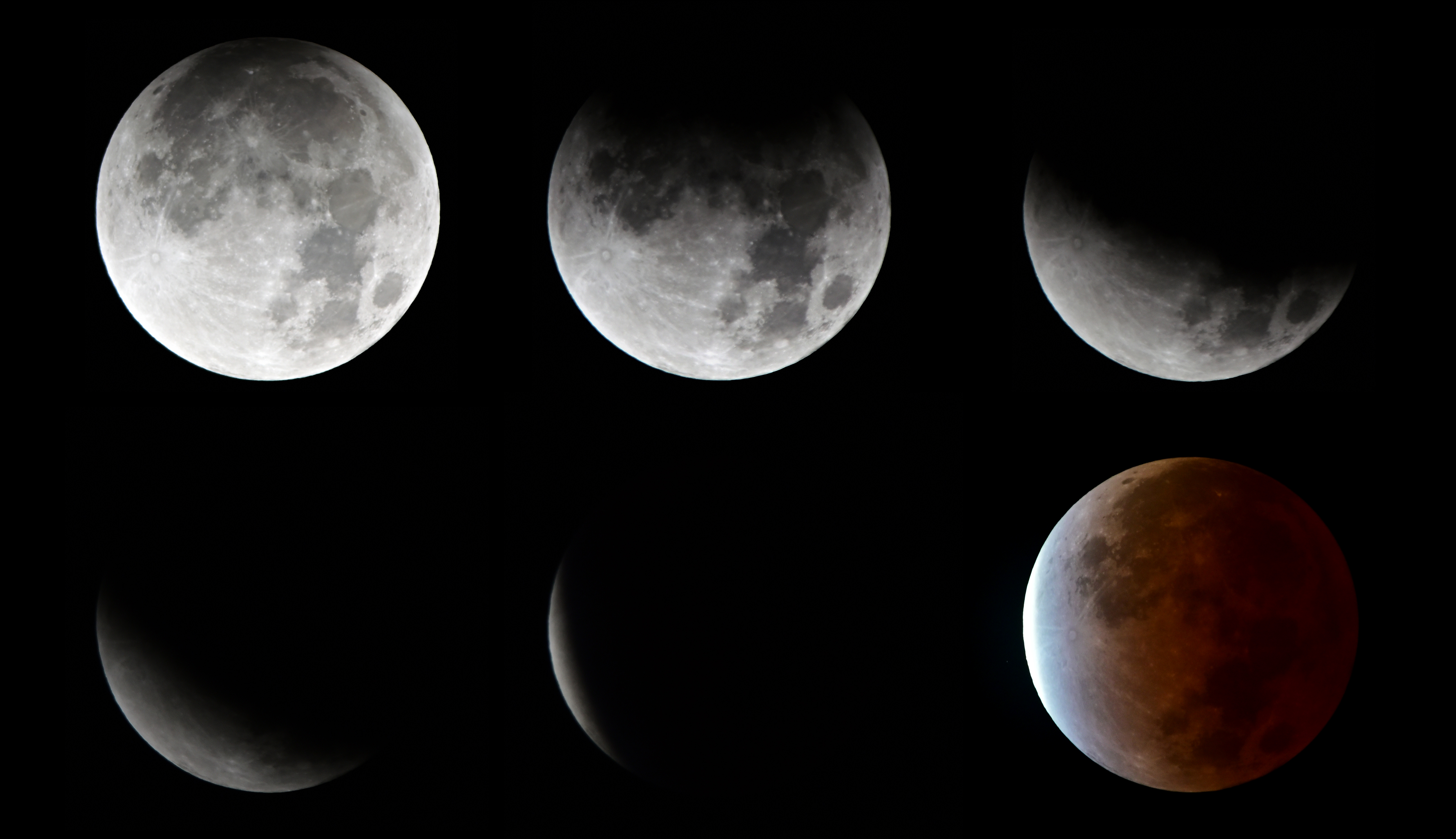
Eclipse progression as seen from Texas

== Eclipse details ==
Shown below is a table displaying details about this particular lunar eclipse. It describes various parameters pertaining to this eclipse.

November 19, 2021 Lunar Eclipse Parameters
Parameter	Value
Penumbral Magnitude	2.07381
Umbral Magnitude	0.97595
Gamma	−0.45525
Sun Right Ascension	15^{h} 39^{m} 50.9^{s}
Sun Declination	−19° 32′ 33.1″
Sun Semi-Diameter	16′ 11.0″
Sun Equatorial Horizontal Parallax	08.9″
Moon Right Ascension	03^{h} 40^{m} 24.8^{s}
Moon Declination	+19° 09′ 15.5″
Moon Semi-Diameter	14′ 44.5″
Moon Equatorial Horizontal Parallax	0° 54′ 06.1″
ΔT	69.3 s

== Eclipse season ==
This eclipse is part of an eclipse season, a period, roughly every six months, when eclipses occur. Only two (or occasionally three) eclipse seasons occur each year, and each season lasts about 35 days and repeats just short of six months (173 days) later; thus two full eclipse seasons always occur each year. Either two or three eclipses happen each eclipse season. In the sequence below, each eclipse is separated by a fortnight.

Eclipse season of November–December 2021
November 19 Ascending node (full moon)	December 4 Descending node (new moon)
Partial lunar eclipse Lunar Saros 126	Total solar eclipse Solar Saros 152

== Related eclipses ==
=== Eclipses in 2021 ===
- A total lunar eclipse on May 26.
- An annular solar eclipse on June 10.
- A partial lunar eclipse on November 19.
- A total solar eclipse on December 4.

=== Metonic ===
- Preceded by: Lunar eclipse of January 31, 2018
- Followed by: Lunar eclipse of September 7, 2025

=== Tzolkinex ===
- Preceded by: Lunar eclipse of October 8, 2014
- Followed by: Lunar eclipse of December 31, 2028

=== Half-Saros ===
- Preceded by: Solar eclipse of November 13, 2012
- Followed by: Solar eclipse of November 25, 2030

=== Tritos ===
- Preceded by: Lunar eclipse of December 21, 2010
- Followed by: Lunar eclipse of October 18, 2032

=== Lunar Saros 126 ===
- Preceded by: Lunar eclipse of November 9, 2003
- Followed by: Lunar eclipse of November 30, 2039

=== Inex ===
- Preceded by: Lunar eclipse of December 9, 1992
- Followed by: Lunar eclipse of October 30, 2050

=== Triad ===
- Preceded by: Lunar eclipse of January 19, 1935
- Followed by: Lunar eclipse of September 20, 2108

=== Lunar eclipses of 2020–2023 ===
This eclipse is a member of a semester series. An eclipse in a semester series of lunar eclipses repeats approximately every 177 days and 4 hours (a semester) at alternating nodes of the Moon's orbit.

The penumbral lunar eclipses on January 10, 2020 and July 5, 2020 occur in the previous lunar year eclipse set.

Lunar eclipse series sets from 2020 to 2023
Descending node				Ascending node			
Saros	Date Viewing	Type Chart	Gamma	Saros	Date Viewing	Type Chart	Gamma
111	2020 Jun 05	Penumbral	1.2406	116	2020 Nov 30	Penumbral	−1.1309
121	2021 May 26	Total	0.4774	126	2021 Nov 19	Partial	−0.4553
131	2022 May 16	Total	−0.2532	136	2022 Nov 08	Total	0.2570
141	2023 May 05	Penumbral	−1.0350	146	2023 Oct 28	Partial	0.9472

=== Metonic series ===
- First eclipse: November 20, 2002.
- Second eclipse: November 19, 2021.
- Third eclipse: November 18, 2040.
- Fourth eclipse: November 19, 2059.
- Fifth eclipse: November 19, 2078.

=== Saros 126 ===
This eclipse is a part of Saros series 126, repeating every 18 years, 11 days, and containing 70 events. The series started with a penumbral lunar eclipse on July 18, 1228. It contains partial eclipses from March 24, 1625 through June 9, 1751; total eclipses from June 19, 1769 through November 9, 2003; and a second set of partial eclipses from November 19, 2021 through June 5, 2346. The series ends at member 70 as a penumbral eclipse on August 19, 2472.

The longest duration of totality was produced by member 36 at 106 minutes, 27 seconds on August 13, 1859. All eclipses in this series occur at the Moon’s ascending node of orbit.

Greatest	First			
The greatest eclipse of the series occurred on 1859 Aug 13, lasting 106 minutes, 27 seconds.	Penumbral	Partial	Total	Central
The greatest eclipse of the series occurred on 1859 Aug 13, lasting 106 minutes, 27 seconds.	1228 Jul 18	1625 Mar 24	1769 Jun 19	1805 Jul 11
The greatest eclipse of the series occurred on 1859 Aug 13, lasting 106 minutes, 27 seconds.	Last			
The greatest eclipse of the series occurred on 1859 Aug 13, lasting 106 minutes, 27 seconds.	Central	Total	Partial	Penumbral
The greatest eclipse of the series occurred on 1859 Aug 13, lasting 106 minutes, 27 seconds.	1931 Sep 26	2003 Nov 09	2346 Jun 05	2472 Aug 19

Eclipses are tabulated in three columns; every third eclipse in the same column is one exeligmos apart, so they all cast shadows over approximately the same parts of the Earth.

Series members 33–54 occur between 1801 and 2200:
33	34	35
1805 Jul 11	1823 Jul 23	1841 Aug 02
36	37	38
1859 Aug 13	1877 Aug 23	1895 Sep 04
39	40	41
1913 Sep 15	1931 Sep 26	1949 Oct 07
42	43	44
1967 Oct 18	1985 Oct 28	2003 Nov 09
45	46	47
2021 Nov 19	2039 Nov 30	2057 Dec 11
48	49	50
2075 Dec 22	2094 Jan 01	2112 Jan 14
51	52	53
2130 Jan 24	2148 Feb 04	2166 Feb 15
54
2184 Feb 26

=== Tritos series ===
This eclipse is a part of a tritos cycle, repeating at alternating nodes every 135 synodic months (≈ 3986.63 days, or 11 years minus 1 month). Their appearance and longitude are irregular due to a lack of synchronization with the anomalistic month (period of perigee), but groupings of 3 tritos cycles (≈ 33 years minus 3 months) come close (≈ 434.044 anomalistic months), so eclipses are similar in these groupings.

Series members between 1801 and 2200
1803 Aug 03 (Saros 106)	1814 Jul 02 (Saros 107)	1825 Jun 01 (Saros 108)	1836 May 01 (Saros 109)	1847 Mar 31 (Saros 110)
1858 Feb 27 (Saros 111)	1869 Jan 28 (Saros 112)	1879 Dec 28 (Saros 113)	1890 Nov 26 (Saros 114)	1901 Oct 27 (Saros 115)
1912 Sep 26 (Saros 116)	1923 Aug 26 (Saros 117)	1934 Jul 26 (Saros 118)	1945 Jun 25 (Saros 119)	1956 May 24 (Saros 120)
1967 Apr 24 (Saros 121)	1978 Mar 24 (Saros 122)	1989 Feb 20 (Saros 123)	2000 Jan 21 (Saros 124)	2010 Dec 21 (Saros 125)
2021 Nov 19 (Saros 126)	2032 Oct 18 (Saros 127)	2043 Sep 19 (Saros 128)	2054 Aug 18 (Saros 129)	2065 Jul 17 (Saros 130)
2076 Jun 17 (Saros 131)	2087 May 17 (Saros 132)	2098 Apr 15 (Saros 133)	2109 Mar 17 (Saros 134)	2120 Feb 14 (Saros 135)
2131 Jan 13 (Saros 136)	2141 Dec 13 (Saros 137)	2152 Nov 12 (Saros 138)	2163 Oct 12 (Saros 139)	2174 Sep 11 (Saros 140)
2185 Aug 11 (Saros 141)	2196 Jul 10 (Saros 142)			

=== Inex series ===
This eclipse is a part of the long period inex cycle, repeating at alternating nodes, every 358 synodic months (≈ 10,571.95 days, or 29 years minus 20 days). Their appearance and longitude are irregular due to a lack of synchronization with the anomalistic month (period of perigee). However, groupings of 3 inex cycles (≈ 87 years minus 2 months) comes close (≈ 1,151.02 anomalistic months), so eclipses are similar in these groupings.

Series members between 1801 and 2200
1819 Apr 10 (Saros 119)	1848 Mar 19 (Saros 120)	1877 Feb 27 (Saros 121)
1906 Feb 09 (Saros 122)	1935 Jan 19 (Saros 123)	1963 Dec 30 (Saros 124)
1992 Dec 09 (Saros 125)	2021 Nov 19 (Saros 126)	2050 Oct 30 (Saros 127)
2079 Oct 10 (Saros 128)	2108 Sep 20 (Saros 129)	2137 Aug 30 (Saros 130)
2166 Aug 11 (Saros 131)	2195 Jul 22 (Saros 132)	

=== Half-Saros cycle ===
A lunar eclipse will be preceded and followed by solar eclipses by 9 years and 5.5 days (a half saros). This lunar eclipse is related to two total solar eclipses of Solar Saros 133.

November 13, 2012	November 25, 2030

== See also ==
- List of 21st-century lunar eclipses
- List of lunar eclipses
- November 2022 lunar eclipse
