= Bailey (surname) =

- Pronunciation: /ˈbeɪ.li/

Origin
- Meaning: (from Bailiff) "to deliver"
- Region of origin: England

Other names
- Variant forms: Baily, Baillie, Bailie

Bailey is an English or Scottish surname. It is first recorded in Northumberland, where it was said to have been changed from Balliol due to the unpopularity of Scottish king John Balliol (d. 1314). There appears to be no historical evidence for this, and Bain concludes that the earliest form was Baillie or Bailli (recorded in the early 14th century). The origin of the name is most likely from Anglo-Norman bailli, the equivalent of bailiff; bailie remains a regional Scottish variant of the term bailiff. Alternatively, it has been suggested that the Norman name may have been locational, derived from Bailleul-En-Vimeu in Normandy.

== A ==
- Aaron Bailey (disambiguation)
- Abe Bailey (1864–1940), South African diamond tycoon, politician, financier and cricketer
- Abigail Abbot Bailey (1746–1815), American memoirist
- Ace Bailey (1903–1992), Canadian ice hockey player
- Ace Bailey (basketball) (born 2006), American basketball player
- Adrian Bailey (born 1945), British politician
- Alan Bailey (1931–2023), British civil servant
- Albert Bailey (disambiguation)
- Aleen Bailey (born 1980), Jamaican athlete
- Alexander Bailey (disambiguation)
- Alfred Bailey (disambiguation)
- Alfred James Bailey (1868–1948), British politician
- Alice Bailey (1880–1949), British theosophist
- Alicia Vela-Bailey (born 1982), American stunt performer, stunt double, actress, dancer, and choreographer
- Allison or Alison Bailey (disambiguation)
- Allen Bailey (born 1989), American footballer
- Alvin Bailey (born 1991), American footballer
- Amari Bailey (born 2004), American basketball player
- Andrew Bailey (disambiguation)
- Angela Bailey (1962–2021), Canadian athlete
- Anne Bailey (disambiguation)
- Anthony Bailey (author) (1933–2020), English author
- Anthony Bailey (PR advisor) (born 1970), Irish-British-Antiguan campaigner and PR consultant
- Arthur Bailey (disambiguation)

== B ==
- Barbara Bailey (disambiguation)
- Ben Bailey (born 1970), American comedian
- Ben Bailey (astronaut) (born 1987), United States Army soldier, aviator and astronaut candidate
- Benjamin Bailey (disambiguation)
- Benny Bailey (1925–2005), American jazz trumpeter
- Bert Bailey (1868–1953), New Zealand-born Australian writer and actor
- Bert Bailey (politician) (1915–1999), Australian politician
- Bill Bailey (disambiguation)
- Billy Bailey (disambiguation)
- Bob Bailey (disambiguation)
- Boss Bailey (born 1979), American football player
- Brad Bailey (New Hampshire politician)
- Brad Bailey (Texas politician)
- Bret Bailey (born 1964), Australian rules footballer
- Brett Bailey (born 1967), South African playwright, director and artist
- Brenda Bailey, Canadian politician
- Brian Bailey (born 1958), Canadian fashion designer
- Brian Bailey (born 1932), British sports shooter
- Bruce M. Bailey (1935–2022), American author and humorist
- Buck Bailey (1896–1964), American baseball coach
- Buddy Bailey (1957–2025), American baseball manager
- Bunty Bailey (born 1964), English model, dancer and actress
- Burton Bailey, Canadian politician
- Buster Bailey (1902–1967), American jazz clarinettist
- Byron Bailey (1930–1998), American gridiron football player

== C ==
- Cal Bailey (1909–1988), American caricaturist
- Caleb Bailey (1898–1957), American Marine Corps officer, pilot and athlete
- Calvin Bailey (born 1977), British politician
- Cameron Bailey (born 19??), Canadian film critic and festival programmer
- Candace Bailey (born 1982), American actress
- Carey Bailey (born 1969), American football player and coach
- Carl Bailey (born 1958), American basketball player
- Carl E. Bailey (1894–1948), American politician, 31st Governor of Arkansas
- Carlton Bailey (born 1964), American football linebacker
- Carolyn Sherwin Bailey (1875–1961), American author of children's stories
- Catherine Bailey (disambiguation)
- Champ Bailey (born 1978), American football player
- Charlene Bailey, birth name of Australian musician later known as Charlie Collins
- Charlie or Charles Bailey (disambiguation)
- Charles Justin Bailey (1859–1946), United States Army general
- Chip Bailey (1921–1963), New Zealand trade unionist
- Chloe Bailey (born 1998), American actress and singer-songwriter (of Chloe x Halle)
- Chris Bailey (disambiguation)
- Christopher Bailey (fashion designer) (born 1971), English fashion executive
- Christopher Bailey (runner) (born 2000), American track and field runner
- Christopher Bailey (screenwriter) (born 1948), British lecturer and Doctor Who screenwriter
- Cindy-Lu Bailey (born 1965), Australian deaf swimmer and the most decorated woman in Deaflympics history
- CJ Bailey (born 2006), American football player
- Clarence Bailey (1963–2006), American football player
- Clifton George Bailey III (born 1967), Jamaican reggae artist known as Capleton
- Clinton Bailey (1936–2025), American-Israeli political scientist
- Colin Bailey (disambiguation)
- Corinne Bailey Rae (born 1979), British singer
- Cory Bailey (born 1971), American baseball pitcher
- Cullen Bailey (born 1985), Australian cricketer

== D ==
- D. R. Shackleton Bailey (1917–2005), British classical scholar
- Dan, Danny or Daniel Bailey (disambiguation)
- Darrell Bailey, basketball fan known as Clipper Darrell
- Dave or David Bailey (disambiguation)
- Dawayne Bailey (born 19??), American guitarist
- Dean Bailey (1967–2014), Australian rules football player and coach
- DeFord Bailey (1899–1982), American country musician
- Dennis Bailey (disambiguation)
- Derek Bailey (guitarist) (1930–2005), British guitarist
- Derek Bailey (tribal chairman) (born 1972), Native American tribal chairman and US Congressional candidate
- Dermot Bailey (born 1994), British professional wheelchair tennis player
- Derrick Bailey (1918–2005), British cricketer and aviation entrepreneur
- Derrick Sherwin Bailey (1910–1984), British theologian
- Deuce Bailey (born 2007), American football quarterback
- Dion Bailey (born 1992), American football safety
- Dona Bailey (born 1955), American computer game designer
- Donald Bailey (disambiguation)
- Donovan Bailey (born 1967), Jamaican-Canadian athlete
- Dot Bailey (born 19??), New Zealand cricketer
- Doug Bailey (1933–2013), American political consultant
- Doug Bailey (footballer), Australian rules football

== E ==
- Ed Bailey (1931–2007), American baseball player
- Edward Bailey (1814–1903), American missionary and painter
- Edward Battersby Bailey (1881–1965), English geologist
- Edwin Bailey (American football) (born 1959), American gridiron football player
- Edwin Bailey (politician) (1836–1908), English-American businessman and politician
- Edwin C. Bailey (1816–1890), American newspaper editor and postmaster
- Eion Bailey (born 1976), American actor
- Elisabeth Tova Bailey, American writer
- Elizabeth Bailey (1938–2022), American economist
- Ellene Alice Bailey (1853–1897), American inventor and designer
- Elles Bailey, English blues rock singer, songwriter, and pianist
- Elvyonn Bailey (born 1991), American sprinter
- Emani Bailey (born 2001), American football player
- Emma Bailey (died 1999), first American woman auctioneer
- Erastus Michael Bailey, American singer-songwriter better known as Razzy Bailey
- Eric Bailey (disambiguation)
- Everett Russell Bailey (1888–1932), American physician

== F ==
- F. G. Bailey (1924–2020), British social anthropologist
- F. Lee Bailey (1933–2021), American attorney
- Florence Gell (1906–2001), née Bailey, Canadian civic leader
- Florence Merriam Bailey (1863–1948), American ornithologist
- Fran Bailey (born 1946), Australian politician
- Frank Bailey (disambiguation)
- Fred Bailey (baseball) (1895–1972), American baseball player
- Frederick Bailey (disambiguation)

== G ==
- G. W. Bailey (born 1944), American actor
- Gamaliel Bailey (1807–1859), American journalist
- Garnet Bailey (1948–2001), Canadian hockey player
- Gary Bailey (born 1958), English footballer
- Gene Bailey (1893–1973), American baseball player
- Geoff Bailey (born 19??), British archaeologist
- Geoffrey Bailey (1899–19??), British First World War flying ace
- George Bailey (disambiguation)
- Gerald Bailey (1903–1975), British politician
- Gillian Bailey (born 1955), British actress and academic
- Glenda Bailey (born 1958), British journalist
- Graeme Bailey (born 1943), Australian racing driver
- Graham Bailey (footballer) (1920–2024), English footballer
- Graham Bailey (rugby union) (born 1936), Australian rugby union footballer
- Guy Bailey (born 1950), American educator

== H ==
- H. B. Bailey (1936–2003), American racing driver
- H. C. Bailey (1878–1961), British writer
- H. E. Bailey (died 1976), Oklahoma politician
- Hachaliah Bailey (1775–1845), American circusman
- Halle Bailey (born 2000), American actress and singer-songwriter (of Chloe x Halle)
- Hannah Johnston Bailey (1839–1923), American Quaker teacher, activist, and advocate
- Harold Walter Bailey (1899–1996), English linguistic scholar
- Harold Bailey (gridiron football) (born 1957), American football player
- Harry Bailey (footballer) (1919–1996), footballer for Leicester Fosse
- Harry Bailey (1922–1985), Australian psychiatrist
- Harvey Bailey (1887–1979), American bank robber
- Hedley Bailey (1895–1968), English footballer
- Helen Bailey (1965–2016), British author
- Henry Bailey (disambiguation)
- Homer Bailey (born 1986), American baseball player
- Horace Bailey (1881–1960), English footballer

== I ==
- Frank I. Bailey Jr. (born 1936), American politician
- Ian Bailey (author) (born 1959), English writer
- Ian Bailey (British Army soldier) (born 1959), British Army soldier
- Ian Bailey (footballer) (born 1956), English footballer
- Ida D. Bailey (1866–1908), American teacher and civil rights activist
- Imogen Bailey (born 1977), Australian actress
- Irving Widmer Bailey (1884–1967), American botanist
- Isaac George Bailey (1847–1914), American politician
- Issac Bailey, American author
- Issy Bailey (born 1994), British paralympic sports shooter
- Mildred Inez Bailey (1919–2009), United States Army general
- Solon Irving Bailey (1854–1931), American astronomer

== J ==
- J. A. Bailey (1930–2018), English cricketer and administrator
- J. C. Bailey (1983–2010), American professional wrestler
- J. Michael Bailey (born 1957), American psychologist
- J. O. Bailey (1903–1979), American literary theorist
- J. R. Bailey (1932–1980), American musician
- Jack Bailey (Georgia politician) (1812–1897), American politician
- Jack Bailey (Maryland politician) (born 1965), American politician
- Jack Bailey (actor) (1907–1980), American actor and daytime game show
- Jack Bailey (New South Wales politician) (1871–1947), Australian politician
- Jack Bailey (footballer, born 1921) (1921–1986), English footballer
- Jack Bailey (co-operator) (1898–1969), Welsh co-operative activist and politician
- Jack Bailey (footballer, born 1901), English footballer
- Jackson Bailey (1925–1996), American historian
- Jacob Bailey (author) (1731–1808), American clergyman
- Jacob Whitman Bailey (1811–1857), American naturalist
- Jade Bailey (athlete) (born 1983), Barbadian sprinter
- Jade Bailey (footballer) (born 1995), British-Jamaican footballer
- Jake Bailey (American football) (born 1997), American football player
- Jake Bailey (make-up artist) (1978–2015), American make-up artist and photographer
- Jamaal Bailey (born 1982), American politician
- James Anthony Bailey (1847–1906), American circus proprietor
- James Bailey (American politician) (1801–1880), Texan mayor
- James Bailey (British politician) (1840–1910), British politician
- James Bailey (basketball) (born 1957), American basketball player
- James Bailey (rugby union) (born 1983), English rugby union player
- James Bailey (footballer) (born 1988), English footballer
- James Bailey (classical scholar) (1796–1864), English classical scholar and schoolmaster
- James Bailey (field hockey) (born 1991), English field hockey player
- James Bailey (darts player) (born 1969), Australian darts player
- James Bailey (businessman) (born 1973/1974), British businessman
- James E. Bailey (1822–1885), American politician
- James E. Bailey (Medal of Honor), fl.]] 1870s)
- James Montgomery Bailey (1841–1894), American humorist
- James P. Bailey, American architect
- James R. A. Bailey (1919–2000), South African publisher and writer
- James R. Bailey (born 1963), American business scholar
- James Thomas Bailey, American comedian
- Janelle Bailey (born 1999), American basketball player
- JaQuan Bailey (born 1997), American football player
- Jay Bailey (1944–2001), American chemical engineer
- Jaye Bailey (born 1973), New Zealand softball player
- Jaymi Bailey (born 1976), American soccer player
- Jeannette Bailey (1931–2008), British fencer
- Jeff Bailey (born 1978), American baseball player
- Jeff Bailey (bishop) (born 1968), American Anglican bishop, consultant, and academic
- Jennifer Bailey (born 1996), British acrobatic gymnast
- Jennifer D. Bailey, American judge
- Jennings Bailey (1867–1963), American judge
- Jenny Bailey (born 1962), British Liberal Democrat politician
- Jeremiah Bailey (1773–1853), American politician
- Jeremy Bailey (born 1979), Canadian new media, video, and performance artist
- Jerry Bailey (born 1957), American jockey
- Jess Bailey (born 2006), British athlete
- Jim Bailey (American football) (born 1948), American football player
- Jim Bailey (entertainer) (1949–2015), American actor
- Jim Bailey (runner) (1929–2020), Australian middle-distance runner
- Jim Bailey (baseball) (1934–2022), American baseball player
- Jim Bailey (cricketer) (1908–1988), English cricketer
- Jimmy Bailey (born 1954), Honduran footballer
- Joe Bailey (Australian footballer) (1921–1996), Australian rules footballer
- Joe Bailey (English footballer) (1890–1974), English footballer
- Joe Bailey (wrestler) (1886–1951), Australian wrestler
- Joe Bailey (rugby union) (born 2004), English rugby union player
- Joel Bailey (tennis) (born 1951), American tennis player
- Joel Bailey (surveyor) (1732–1797), American surveyor
- Joel John Bailey (born 1980), Canadian association football player
- Joh Bailey (born 1962), Australian hair stylist
- John Bailey (British actor) (1912–1989), British actor
- John Bailey (American actor) (1947–1994), American actor
- John Bailey (Massachusetts politician) (1786–1835), American politician
- John Bailey (cinematographer) (1942–2023), American cinematographer and film director
- John Bailey (solicitor) (1928–2021), British solicitor
- John Bailey (producer), Canadian freelance recording engineer
- John Bailey (footballer, born 1950), English footballer
- John Bailey (footballer, born 1969), English footballer
- John Bailey (footballer, born 1957), English footballer
- John Bailey (Australian politician) (born 1954), Australian politician
- John Bailey (critic) (1864–1931), English literary critic
- John Bailey (New Zealand cricketer) (born 1941), New Zealand cricketer
- John Bailey (luthier) (1931–2011), British luthier
- John Bailey (Irish politician) (1945–2019), Irish Fine Gael politician
- John Bailey (minister) (1643–1697), English dissenting minister, later in life in New England
- John Bailey (agriculturist) (1750–1819), English agriculturist and engraver
- John Bailey (English cricketer) (born 1940), English cricketer
- John Bailey (cutler) (1736–1800), American cutler and metalworker
- John Bailey (rugby league) (born 1954), Australian RL coach and former rugby league footballer
- John Bailey (MP) (died 1436), English politician
- John Bailey (Victorian politician) (1826–1871), Australian politician
- John D. Bailey (1924–2018), American civic leader and philanthropist
- John Edgar Bailey (1897–1958), Northern Ireland politician
- John Eglington Bailey (1840–1888), English antiquary
- John Frederick Bailey (1866–1938), Australian botanist
- John H. Bailey (1864–1940), American politician
- John Moran Bailey (1904–1975), American politician
- John Mosher Bailey (1838–1916), American politician
- John O. Bailey (1880–1959), American judge and politician
- John P. Bailey (born 1951), American judge
- John William Bailey (1831–1914), British painter
- Johnny Bailey (1967–2010), American football player
- Jonathan Bailey (born 1988), English actor
- Jonathan Bailey (bishop) (1940–2008), English Anglican bishop
- Jonathan W. Bailey, Former NOAA Corps Director
- Joseph Bailey (general) (1825–1867), American Civil War Union Army officer
- Joseph Bailey (congressman) (1810–1885), American politician
- Joseph Bailey (Sudbury MP) (1812–1850), British politician
- Joseph Bailey (cricketer) (born 1942), Bermudian cricketer
- Joseph Bailey (author), American psychologist, consultant and public speaker
- Joseph M. Bailey (1833–1895), American judge
- Joseph W. Bailey (1862–1929), American politician
- Joseph Weldon Bailey Jr. (1892–1943), American politician
- Josh Bailey (born 1989), Canadian ice hockey player
- Josh Bailey (footballer), English footballer
- Josiah Bailey (1873–1946), American politician
- Judith Bailey (composer) (1941–2025), Cornish composer and conductor
- Judith Bailey (academic) (born 1946), American college president
- Judy Bailey (pianist) (1935–2025), New Zealand pianist and composer
- Judy Bailey (born 1953), New Zealand news presenter
- Jules Bailey (born 1979), American politician
- Julian Bailey (racing driver) (born 1961), British racing driver
- Julian Bailey (actor) (born 1977), Canadian actor
- Julian Bailey (rugby league) (born 1978), Australian rugby league footballer
- Julian T. Bailey (born 1859), American lawyer, professor, and publisher
- Julie Bailey, British activist
- Justin Bailey (born 1995), American ice hockey player
- Justin Bailey (basketball) (born 1977), American basketball player

== K ==
- Kate Bailey (born 1982), Australian Paralympic swimmer
- Kathryn Ann Bailey (born 1943) American politician known as Kay Bailey Hutchison
- Keith Bailey (cricketer) (born 1964), Irish cricketer
- Keith Bailey (soccer)
- Kelly Bailey (composer) (born 19??), New Zealand composer and game designer
- Kenneth Bailey (disambiguation)
- Kevin Bailey (poet) (born 1954), British poet
- Kevin Bailey (politician) (born 19??), Texas state representative, 1991–2009
- Kid Bailey, (dates unknown), American Mississippi Delta bluesman
- Kyle Bailey (basketball) (born 1982), American basketball player

== L ==
- Laura Bailey (born 1981), American voice actress
- Laura Bailey (model) (born 1972), English model
- Laura Bailey (footballer) (born 1992), retired Australian rules footballer
- Lawrence Dudley Bailey (1819–1891), a justice of the Kansas Supreme Court
- Lee Bailey (born 1972), Scottish footballer
- Len Bailey (1926–1997), British automobile designer
- Leon Bailey (born 1997), Jamaican footballer
- Leonard Bailey (inventor) (1825–1905), inventor/toolmaker who invented a plane (tool)
- Leonard C. Bailey (1825–1918), African-American business owner and inventor
- Leonard Lee Bailey (1942–2019), surgeon who transplanted heart of baboon into Baby Fae
- Lepha Eliza Bailey (1845−1924), American writer and lecturer
- LeRoy Bailey Jr., senior pastor of The First Cathedral
- Levelle Bailey (born 2000), American football player
- Levin C. Bailey (c. 1892–1952), judge of the Maryland Court of Appeals
- Liam Bailey (born 1983), English musician and singer
- Liberty Hyde Bailey (1858–1954), American botanist
- Loring Woart Bailey (1839–1925), American geologist
- Lorna Bailey (born 1978), British ceramic artist
- Lowell Bailey (born 1981), American biathlete
- Lucy Bailey (born 19??), British theatre director
- Luke Bailey (rugby league) (born 1980), Australian rugby league international
- Luke Bailey (actor) (born 1984), British actor
- Lydia Bailey (printer) (1779–1869), American printer
- Leslie Patrick Bailey (1953–1993), British murderer

== M ==
- Madilyn Bailey, American singer-songwriter
- Madison Bailey (born 1999), American actress
- Malcolm Bailey (footballer, born 1937) (1937–2016), English footballer
- Malcolm Bailey (footballer, born 1950) (1950–2017), English footballer
- Margaret Ann Bailey (1879–1955), Australian teacher
- Margaret E. Bailey (1915–2014), the first black United States Army Nurse Corps colonel
- Margaret Jewett Smith Bailey (c. 1812–1882) American pioneer, missionary, and author
- Marian Breland Bailey (1920–2001), American psychologist
- Marion Bailey (born 1951), British actress
- Mark Bailey (disambiguation)
- Markus Bailey (born 1997), American football player
- Martin B. Bailey (1857–1934), American politician and lawyer
- Mathis Bailey (born 1981), American-Canadian novelist and fiction writer
- Mat Bailey (born 1986), English footballer
- Matt Bailey (born 1991), Canadian ice hockey player
- Maurice Bailey (basketball) (born 1981), American basketball player
- Maurice and Maralyn Bailey, World Record for longest time adrift at Sea (117 days)
- Max Bailey (born 1986), Australian rules footballer
- McKinley Bailey (born 19??), American politician
- Mike or Michael Bailey (disambiguation)
- Mildred Bailey (1907–1951), American singer
- Millie Bailey (1918–2022), American World War II veteran, civil servant and volunteer

== N ==
- Nancy Bailey (1863–1913), UK indexer of Hansard and The Times
- Nat Bailey (1902–1978), Canadian restaurateur
- Nathan Bailey (died 1742), English lexicographer
- Neil Bailey (born 1958), English football player, coach and assistant manager
- Nellah Massey Bailey (1893–1956), American politician and librarian
- Nicholas Bailey (disambiguation), several people
- Nicky Bailey (born 1984), English footballer
- Norma Bailey (born 1949), Canadian film director
- Norman Bailey (disambiguation)

== O ==
- O. H. Bailey (1843–1947), American maker of panoramic maps
- Oliver Bailey (born 1982), English cricketer

== P ==
- Patricia Bailey (Illinois politician), American politician from Illinois
- Patricia Bailey-Snook (1936–2011), American politician from Florida
- Patrick Bailey (born 1999), American baseball player
- Patrick Bailey (American football) (born 1985), American football linebacker
- Paul Dayton Bailey (1906–1987), American writer
- Paul Bailey (disambiguation)
- Margaret Jewett Bailey (1812–1882), American poet
- Paul J. Bailey (1922–2001), American jockey
- Pearce Bailey (1865–1922), American neurologist and psychiatrist
- Pearl Bailey (1918–1990), American singer and actress
- Peter Bailey (disambiguation)
- Phil Bailey (born 1980), Australian rugby league player
- Philip James Bailey (1816–1902), British poet
- Philip Bailey (born 1951), American singer
- Philip Bailey (statistician) (born 1953), British cricket statistician

== Q ==
- Quinn Bailey (born 1995), American football player

== R ==
- Ralph Emerson Bailey (1878–1948), American congressman from Missouri
- Ray Bailey (1935–2012), Tasmanian politician
- Raymond Bailey (1904–1980), American actor
- Raymond Bailey (sportsman) (born 1944), English cricketer and footballer
- Razzy Bailey (1939–2021), American singer-songwriter
- Rebecca Bailey (born 1974), New Zealand Olympic road cyclist
- Richard W. Bailey (1939–2011), American linguist
- Richard William Bailey (1885–1957), British mechanical engineer
- Ricky Bailey (born 1997), English rugby league footballer
- Rob or Robert Bailey (disambiguation)
- Robin Bailey (1919–1999), English actor
- Robin Wayne Bailey (born 1952), American writer
- Rodney Bailey (born 1979), American football defensive end
- Roger Bailey (rugby league) (born 19??), New Zealand rugby league international
- Roger Bailey (baseball) (born 1970), American baseball player
- Ronald Bailey (disambiguation), including two Ronalds who go by the name Ron
- Rosanne Bailey (1950–2016), United States military officer
- Roy Bailey (disambiguation)
- Russ Bailey (1897–1949), American football center
- Ruth Bailey (1913–1989), American actress
- Ryan Bailey (disambiguation)

== S ==
- Sam Bailey (born 1977), British singer, winner of the 2013 series of the UK's X Factor
- Sam Bailey (coach) (1924–2010), American college football, basketball, and baseball coach
- Samantha Bailey (actress) (born 2001), American actress
- Samuel Bailey (1791–1870), British philosopher and writer
- Sarah Bailey (born 1977), British Paralympian swimmer and cyclist now known as Dame Sarah Storey
- Sarah Lord Bailey (1856–1922), elocutionist and teacher
- Sarah Randolph Bailey (1885–1972), American educator and Girl Scout pioneer
- Scott Bailey (disambiguation)
- Sean Bailey (born 19??), American television and film producer
- Sean Bailey (climber) (born 1996), American rock climber
- Sean Bailey (sprinter) (born 1997), Jamaican springer
- Sergio Bailey (born 1994), American football player
- Shaun Bailey (London politician) (born 1971), a member of the London Assembly and former Conservative candidate for Mayor of London
- Shaun Bailey (West Bromwich MP) (born 1992), Conservative Member of Parliament for West Bromwich West
- Shaun Bailey (cricketer) (born 1990), player for Northamptonshire
- Sidney Bailey (1882–1942), British Royal Navy Admiral
- Simon Bailey (disambiguation)
- Sly Bailey, British newspaper executive
- Solon Irving Bailey (1854–1931), American astronomer
- Spencer Bailey (born c. 1986), American three-year-old survivor of United Airlines Flight 232 air crash in 1989
- Stacey Bailey (born 1962), American football player
- Stanley Bailey (1926–2008), senior British police officer
- Stanley John Bailey (1901–1980), British professor of law and legal writer
- Stefan Bailey (born 1987), English footballer
- Steve, Stephen or Steven Bailey (disambiguation)
- Sydney D. Bailey (1916–1995), English author and pacifist

== T ==
- Tania Bailey (born 1979), British squash player
- Tanya Bailey (born 1981), Australian BMX cyclist
- Teddy Bailey (1944–2021), American footballer
- Temple Bailey (1869–1963), American writer
- Terry Bailey (born 1947), English footballer
- Theodorus Bailey (politician) (1758–1828), United States senator from New York
- Theodorus Bailey (officer) (1805–1877), naval officer in the U.S. Civil War and the senator's nephew
- Thomas Bailey (disambiguation)
- Thurl Bailey (born 1961), American basketball player
- Tim Bailey (born 1963), Australian journalist, radio and TV presenter and sports reporter
- Toby Bailey (born 1975), American sports agent and former basketball player
- Toby Bailey (cricketer) (born 1976), English wicketkeeper
- Tom Bailey (disambiguation)
- Trevor Bailey (1923–2011), English cricketer, cricket writer and broadcaster
- Trevor Bailey (rugby league) (born 1962), Australian rugby league footballer

== V ==
- Vernon Orlando Bailey (1864–1942), American naturalist
- Vernon Howe Bailey (1874–1953), American artist and photographer
- Victor Bailey (disambiguation)
- Vivian Bailey (1869–1938) Irish-born British Army brigadier general in the First World War

== W ==
- W. P. Bailey (fl.1864–1871), English cricketer
- Warren Worth Bailey (1855–1928), American congressman from Pennsylvania
- Wendell Bailey (born 1940), American congressman from Missouri
- Wesley Bailey (1808–1889), American newspaper editor and politician
- Wesley Bailey (American football) (born 2001), Canadian football player
- Wilford S. Bailey (1921–2000), American academic administrator
- Wilfrid Norman Bailey (1893–1961), British mathematician
- Wilfred Bailey, 3rd Baron Glanusk (1891–1948), British peer and soldier
- William Bailey (disambiguation)
- Willie Bailey (born 1946), American politician

== Z ==
- Zac Bailey (born 1999), Australian rules footballer
- Zack Bailey (born 1995), American football player

== Fictional characters ==
- Beetle Bailey, eponymous cartoon character of Mort Walker
- Beth Bailey, fictional character from Spooks
- George Bailey, in the 1946 film "It's a Wonderful Life"
- Harry Bailey (Coronation Street), from the British soap opera
- Kelly Bailey (Misfits), from the British TV series Misfits
- Miranda Bailey, from Grey's Anatomy
- Rachel Bailey, from English TV show Scott and Bailey
- Will Bailey, from The West Wing
- The Bailey family on Coronation Street, consisting of:
  - James Bailey
  - Ed Bailey
  - Michael Bailey
  - Aggie Bailey
  - Ronnie Bailey

== See also ==
- Bailey (disambiguation)
- Bailey (given name)
- Bailie (surname)
- Baillie (surname)
- Baily (surname)
- Bayly (surname)
