= General Bailey =

General Bailey may refer to:

- Caleb Bailey (1898–1957), U.S. Marine Corps brigadier general
- Charles Justin Bailey (1859–1946), U.S. Army major general
- Charles R. Bailey (fl. 1970s–2010s), U.S. Army brigadier general
- Joseph Bailey (general) (1825–1867), Union Army brigadier general and brevet major general
- Mildred Inez Caroon Bailey (1919–2009), U.S. Army brigadier general
- Robert E. Bailey (fl. 1970s–2020s), U.S. Air Force Reserve brigadier general
- Ronald L. Bailey (fl. 1970s–2010s), U.S. Marine Corps lieutenant general
- Rosanne Bailey (1950–2016), U.S. Air Force brigadier general
- Vivian Bailey (1869–1938), British Army brigadier general

== See also ==
- Attorney General Bailey (disambiguation)
