= Kathryn Bailey =

Kathryn Bailey is the name of:

- Kathryn Bailey Hutchison (born 1943), née Bailey, US senator
- Kathryn Bailey (runner) (born 1968), participant in the 1995 IAAF World Half Marathon Championships
- Kathryn Bailey (music theorist) - see List of Cambridge Companions to Music

== See also ==
- Katherine Bailey (born 1982), Australian swimmer
- Catherine Bailey (disambiguation)
