= Daniel Bailey (disambiguation) =

Daniel Bailey (born 1986) is a sprinter from Antigua and Barbuda.

Dan, Daniel or Danny Bailey may also refer to:

- Daniel Bailey (basketball) (born 1990), American basketball player for Tokyo Excellence in Japan
- Daniel A. Bailey (1894–1970), American politician in Pennsylvania
- Dan Bailey (footballer) (1893–1967), English footballer
- Dan Bailey (American football) (born 1988), American football placekicker
- Dan Bailey (conservationist) (1904–1982), American conservationist
- Danny Bailey (born 1964), English footballer

== See also ==
- "The Ballad of Danny Bailey (1909–34)", a song by Elton John from Goodbye Yellow Brick Road
