= Bailie (surname) =

Bailie is an English surname. Notable people with this name include:

- Ann E. Bailie (born 1935), American mathematician
- Colin Bailie (born 1964), Northern Ireland footballer
- David Bailie (1937–2021), South African actor
- David Bailie Warden (1772–1845), American diplomat, author and book collector
- Helen Tufts Bailie (1874–1962), American social reformer
- James Bailie (1890–1967), Northern Ireland politician
- Jim Bailie (fl. 1940s–70s), Ulster Unionist Party politician
- Joan Lavender Bailie Guthrie (1889–1914), English suffragette
- Joseph Bailie (1860–1935), Irish-American missionary and educator in China
- Kelly Bailie (born 1980), Northern Irish footballer
- Kevin Bailie (born 1992), Canadian ice hockey player
- Kim Bailie (1929–2008), South-African born American rocketry expert
- Martin Bailie (1962–2022), Northern Irish hurler
- Noel Bailie (born 1971), Northern Irish footballer
- Robin Bailie (born 1937), Northern Irish politician
- Ryan Bailie (born 1990), Australian triathlete
- Sally A. Bailie (1937–1995), American race-horse trainer and owner
- Sandra Bailie (born 1960), Northern Irish lawn bowler
- Thomas Bailie (1885–1957), Northern Irish politician
- Tony Bailie (born 1962), Irish writer
- William Bailie (died 1648), Scottish emigrant to Ireland
- William Bailie (bishop) (died 1664), Anglican bishop

== See also ==
- Bailie (given name)
- Bailey (surname)
- Baillie (surname)
- Baily (surname)
- Bayly
