= Anne Bailey (disambiguation) =

Anne Bailey (1742–1825) was a British-born American storyteller and frontier scout.

Anne Bailey may also refer to:

- Anne Bailey (ten-pin bowling) (born 1951), British-born ten-pin bowling champion
- Anne Bailey Colombo (born 1997), née Bailey, American soccer player
- Anne Howard Bailey (1924–2006), American writer

== See also ==
- Anne Bayley
- Bailey (surname)
