= Bailyn =

Bailyn is both a surname and a given name. Notable people with the name include:

- Bernard Bailyn (1922–2020), American historian, author, and academic
- Charles Bailyn (born 1959), American astrophysicist
- Lotte Bailyn (born 1930), American social psychologist
- Bailyn Sullivan (born 1998), New Zealand rugby union player

== See also ==
- Baily (surname)
