= Brad Bailey =

Brad Bailey may refer to:

- Brad Bailey (New Hampshire politician)
- Brad Bailey (Texas politician)
