= Frederick Bailey =

Frederick' or Fred Bailey may refer to:

- Frederick Augustus Washington Bailey, birth name of Frederick Douglass (1818–1895), American social reformer, abolitionist, orator, writer, and statesman
- Frederick Manson Bailey (1827–1915), Australian botanist
- Frederick Bailey (forester) (1840–1912) British soldier and forester, father of Frederick Marshman Bailey
- Frederick Marshman Bailey (1882–1967), British intelligence officer and adventurer
- Frederick Bailey (priest) (1889–1965), archdeacon of Malta
- Fred Bailey (baseball) (1895–1972), American baseball player
- Frederick Bailey (cricketer) (1919–1985), English cricketer
- Fred C. Bailey (1925–2021), American engineer
- Frederick Bailey (fl. 1985–present), actor, playwright and screenwriter, works include Equalizer 2000
- Ricky Bailey (born 1997), English rugby league footballer
