= Alison Bailey =

Alison or Allison Bailey may refer to:

== People ==
- Alison Bailey (American academic) (fl. from 1995)
- Alison Bailey (New Zealand academic) (fl. from 2015)
- Allison Bailey (whistleblower) (~1990-2023), former sergeant in the Nevada National Guard who blew the whistle on misconduct in the Guard in 2020
- Allison Bailey, a writer for the Daily Nexus
- Allison Bailey, a musical theatre actress who plays the leading role of Glinda in the North American national tour of Wicked
- Allison Bailey, claimant in the 2022 UK court case Bailey v Stonewall, Garden Court Chambers and Others

== Fictional characters ==
- Alison Bailey, a recurring character in the 2011 police procedural TV series Scott & Bailey
- Alison Bailey, the female protagonist of the 2014 drama TV series The Affair (TV series)
- Alison Bailey, the protagonist of the 2019 psychological thriller Blood Orange (novel), written by Harriet Tyce

== See also ==
- Alison (disambiguation)
- Allison (disambiguation)
- Bailey (disambiguation)
