= Joel Bailey =

Joel Bailey may refer to:

- Joel John Bailey (born 1980), soccer player
- Joel Bailey (surveyor) (1732–1797), American surveyor
- Joel Bailey (tennis) (born 1951), American tennis player
- Joel Bailey (musician), former bassist of Sixpence None the Richer
