= Eric Bailey =

Eric Bailey may refer to:

- Eric Bailey (politician) (1905–1989), British Conservative Member of Parliament for Manchester Gorton, 1931–1935
- Eric Bailey (GC) (1906–1946), Australian recipient of the George Cross
- Eric Bailey (basketball) (born 1960), Australian player with the Hobart Devils, Melbourne Tigers and Gold Coast Rollers
- Eric Bailey (American football) (born 1963), American football player
- Frederick Marshman Bailey (1882–1967), known as Eric, British Intelligence officer and explorer

== See also ==
- Eric Bailly (born 1994), Ivorian footballer
- Bailey (surname)
