= Queens Royals men's basketball statistical leaders =

The Queens Royals men's basketball statistical leaders are individual statistical leaders of the Queens Royals men's basketball program in various categories, including points, assists, blocks, rebounds, and steals. Within those areas, the lists identify single-game, single-season, and career leaders. The Royals represent Queens University of Charlotte in the NCAA Division I ASUN Conference.

Queens began competing in intercollegiate basketball in 1989. These lists are updated through the end of the 2021–22 season.

== Scoring ==
Career
Rk	Player	Points	Seasons
1	Kenny Dye	1897	2018–19 2019–20 2020–21 2021–22 2022–23
2	Reginald Hopkins	1810	2007–08 2008–09 2009–10 2010–11
3	Daniel Bailey	1771	2008–09 2009–10 2010–11 2011–12
4	Carlos Andrade	1603	1999–00 2000–01 2001–02 2002–03
5	Chris Benson	1602	1999–00 2000–01 2001–02 2002–03
6	AJ McKee	1586	2020–21 2021–22 2022–23 2023–24
7	Daniel Carr	1512	2016–17 2017–18 2018–19 2019–20
8	Chuck Wittman	1462	1993–94 1994–95 1995–96 1996–97
9	Chris Ashby	1407	2022–23 2023–24 2024–25 2025–26
10	Spencer Ross	1400	2002–03 2003–04

Season
Rk	Player	Points	Season
1	Spencer Ross	788	2002–03
2	Shaun Willett	717	2018–19
3	J.R. Gamble	627	2000–01
4	AJ McKee	619	2023–24
5	Spencer Ross	612	2003–04
6	Jamari Smith	599	2021–22
7	Glen Harris	586	1998–99
8	Reginald Hopkins	572	2010–11
9	Adrien Pritchard	569	1998–99
10	Daniel Carr	564	2018–19

Single game
Rk	Player	Points	Season	Opponent
1	Leo Colimerio	35	2024–25	Florida Gulf Coast
2	Chris Ashby	34	2025–26	Bellarmine
	Chris Ashby	34	2025–26	Central Arkansas
	Kenny Dye	34	2022–23	Jacksonville State
5	Jamari Smith	33	2021–22	Anderson (SC)
	Jarrett Stokes	33	2013–14	Tusculum
7	AJ McKee	32	2020–21	UVA Wise
	Rob Lewis	32	2014–15	Lenoir-Rhyne
	Jarrett Stokes	32	2013–14	Lenoir-Rhyne
10	AJ McKee	31	2023–24	Austin Peay
	Jalin Alexander	31	2016–17	Anderson
	Sean Morgan	31	2015–16	Coker
	Jarrett Stokes	31	2013–14	Brevard

== Rebounds ==
Career
Rk	Player	Rebounds	Seasons
1	Kendrick Harris	883	2002–03 2003–04 2004–05 2005–06
2	Daniel Bailey	812	2008–09 2009–10 2010–11 2011–12
3	Todd Withers	776	2014–15 2015–16 2016–17 2017–18
4	Carlos Andrade	761	1999–00 2000–01 2001–02 2002–03
5	Gavin Rains	757	2019–20 2020–21 2021–22 2022–23
6	Jay'Den Turner	719	2019–20 2020–21 2021–22 2022–23
7	DeWayne Ansley	700	1991–92 1992–93 1994–95 1995–96
8	Yogi Leo	691	1993–94 1994–95 1995–96
9	Antonio Stabler	624	2009–10 2010–11 2011–12 2012–13
10	Brent Evans	608	2010–11 2011–12 2012–13 2013–14

Season
Rk	Player	Rebounds	Season
1	Shaun Willett	417	2018–19
2	Soce Faye	335	1997–98
3	Todd Withers	288	2017–18
4	Yogi Leo	276	1995–96
5	John Thompson	260	2007–08
6	Darryl White	253	1991–92
7	Lewis Diankulu	251	2018–19
8	Daniel Bailey	249	2008–09
9	Jay'Den Turner	246	2022–23
10	Kendrick Harris	242	2004–05

Single game
Rk	Player	Points	Season	Opponent
1	Gavin Rains	19	2022–23	Paine
	Daniel Camps	19	2015–16	Anderson
3	Jay'Den Turner	18	2022–23	Florida Gulf Coast
4	Daniel Camps	17	2015–16	Coker
5	Gavin Rains	16	2021–22	Coker
	Jay'Den Turner	16	2021–22	Mars Hill
	Gavin Rains	16	2020–21	Coker
	Todd Withers	16	2017–18	Tarleton State
	Todd Withers	16	2015–16	Columbus State
	Jedarian Jackson	16	2014–15	Wingate

== Assists ==
Career
Rk	Player	Assists	Seasons
1	Kenny Dye	675	2018–19 2019–20 2020–21 2021–22 2022–23
2	Donay Fullwood	668	1991–92 1992–93 1993–94 1994–95
3	Daniel Carr	446	2016–17 2017–18 2018–19 2019–20
4	Spencer Ross	340	2002–03 2003–04
5	Ike Agusi	323	2016–17 2017–18
6	Carlos Andrade	293	1999–00 2000–01 2001–02 2002–03
7	Mike King	292	1995–96 1996–97 1997–98 1998–99
8	Sean Eads	291	2008–09 2009–10 2010–11 2011–12
	J.R. Gamble	291	1999–00 2000–01
10	Tavaron Raymon	287	1996–97 1997–98 1998–99 1999–00

Season
Rk	Player	Assists	Season
1	Donay Fullwood	196	1993–94
2	Donay Fullwood	191	1994–95
3	J.R. Gamble	186	2000–01
4	Spencer Ross	181	2002–03
5	Kenny Dye	179	2021–22
6	Ike Agusi	174	2017–18
7	Daniel Carr	160	2018–19
8	Spencer Ross	159	2003–04
9	Kenny Dye	157	2022–23
10	Akeem Miskdeen	150	2006–07

Single game
Rk	Player	Points	Season	Opponent
1	Kenny Dye	16	2020–21	Limestone
2	Kenny Dye	12	2021–22	UVA Wise
	Mike Davis	12	2017–18	UNC Pembroke
4	Kenny Dye	11	2021–22	Johnson & Wales
	Kenny Dye	11	2020–21	UVA Wise
	Ike Agusi	11	2017–18	Wingate
	Ike Agusi	11	2017–18	Lenoir-Rhyne
8	Deyton Albury	10	2023–24	Winthrop
	Kenny Dye	10	2022–23	Marshall
	Kenny Dye	10	2021–22	Anderson (SC)
	Ike Agusi	10	2016–17	Wingate
	Rob Lewis	10	2014–15	Brevard

== Steals ==
Career
Rk	Player	Steals	Seasons
1	J.R. Gamble	246	1999–00 2000–01
2	Carlos Andrade	204	1999–00 2000–01 2001–02 2002–03
3	Kenny Dye	188	2018–19 2019–20 2020–21 2021–22 2022–23
4	Daniel Carr	182	2016–17 2017–18 2018–19 2019–20
5	Chris Benson	174	1999–00 2000–01 2001–02 2002–03
6	Donay Fullwood	165	1991–92 1992–93 1993–94 1994–95
	AJ McKee	165	2020–21 2021–22 2022–23 2023–24
8	Daniel Bailey	141	2008–09 2009–10 2010–11 2011–12
9	Mike Davis	133	2016–17 2017–18
10	Chuck Wittman	130	1993–94 1994–95 1995–96 1996–97

Season
Rk	Player	Steals	Season
1	J.R. Gamble	139	2000–01
2	Marcus Stubblefield	110	1992–93
3	J.R. Gamble	107	1999–00
4	Spencer Ross	77	2002–03
5	Mike Davis	70	2017–18
6	Mike Davis	63	2016–17
7	Darnell Evans	62	2006–07
	Darnell Evans	62	2007–08
9	Donay Fullwood	60	1993–94
10	Carlos Andrade	58	2002–03

== Blocks ==
Career
Rk	Player	Blocks	Seasons
1	Moustapha Diouf	201	2002–03 2003–04
2	Jared Hendryx	196	2013–14 2014–15 2015–16 2016–17
3	Yogi Leo	175	1993–94 1994–95 1995–96
4	Malcolm Wilson	156	2023–24 2024–25
5	Todd Withers	143	2014–15 2015–16 2016–17 2017–18
6	DeWayne Ansley	141	1991–92 1992–93 1994–95 1995–96
7	Robert Kellog	130	1997–98 1998–99 1999–00 2000–01
8	Daniel Bailey	109	2008–09 2009–10 2010–11 2011–12
9	Adrien Pritchard	97	1996–97 1997–98 1998–99
10	Antonio Stabler	96	2009–10 2010–11 2011–12 2012–13

Season
Rk	Player	Blocks	Season
1	Moustapha Diouf	116	2002–03
2	Malcolm Wilson	115	2024–25
3	Moustapha Diouf	85	2003–04
4	Yogi Leo	64	1994–95
5	Todd Withers	62	2017–18
6	Yogi Leo	60	1995–96
7	DeWayne Ansley	59	1994–95
8	Jared Hendryx	58	2016–17
9	Jared Hendryx	51	2014–15
	Yogi Leo	51	1993–94
