= Albert Bailey =

Albert Bailey may refer to:

- Albert Bailey (rugby league), English rugby league footballer who played in the 1930s
- Albert Bailey (cricketer) (1872–1950), English cricketer whose name may have been Alfred
- Bert Bailey (1868–1953), New Zealand-born Australian writer (born Albert Edward Bailey)
- Bert Bailey (politician) (1915–1999), Australian politician
- Albert William Bailey (1873–1955), American missionary
- Albert Bailey (singer), American session singer and member of Faith Hope & Charity

== See also ==
- Albert Baillie (1864–1955), British clergyman
