= Alfred Bailey =

Alfred Bailey may refer to:

- Alfred Bailey (poet) (1905–1997), Canadian poet
- Alfred Bailey (Australian cricketer) (1932–2016), Australian cricketer
- Alfred Bailey (English cricketer) (1871–1950), English cricketer
- Alfred Bailey (trade unionist) (1828/9–1886), English trade union leader
- Alfred Marshall Bailey (1894–1978), American ornithologist
- Alfred James Bailey (1868–1948), British trade unionist and politician

== See also ==
- Alfred Bayly (1866–1907), New Zealand cricketer
