= Edward Bates (disambiguation) =

Edward Bates (1793–1869) was a U.S. lawyer and statesman.

Edward Bates may also refer to:

- Edward Bates (department store), a department store in Kent
- Sir Edward Bates, 1st Baronet (1815–1896), ship-owner and politician
- Sir Edward Percy Bates, 2nd Baronet (1845–1899) of the Bates baronets
- Sir Edward Bertram Bates, 3rd Baronet (1877–1903) of the Bates baronets
- Edward Willard Bates (1884–1930), American physician

== See also ==
- Ted Bates (disambiguation)
- Bates (surname)
