= Edward Willard Bates =

American physician

- Born: November 5, 1884; Dallas, Texas, US
- Died: August 7, 1930 (aged 45); Los Angeles, California, US
- Education: Meharry Medical College (1910)
- Occupation: Physician
- Title: First Lieutenant
- Spouse: Sadie B. Bates

Edward Willard Bates, M.D. (November 5, 1884 – August 7, 1930) was a prominent African-American who served as a physician and surgeon in the 368th Ambulance Company in 317th Sanitary (Medical) Train of the 92nd Division during World War I. For his bravery in battle he was recommended for the Distinguished Service Cross (DSC).

== Early life ==
Edward Bates was born on November 4, 1884 to John W. and Tyria Norwood Bate in Dallas, Texas. Both of Bates's parents were Texas natives and was well involved in the local Baptist community. This was more defined by Bates when he entered Bishop College which was located in Marshall, Texas. Bishop College is a historically black university which relocated to Dallas in the late 20th century. It remained open until 1988 due to a scandal which forced the institution to close. Bates didn't end his education there as he soon entered Meharry Medical College in Nashville, Tennessee. He was a classmate and later fellow soldier of Dr. Everett R. Bailey. According to the commencement pamphlet released on the day of his graduation on April 14, 1910, Bates was a class orator for the medical school graduates. Though Bates was listed to be from Dallas, he soon relocated to Louisville, Kentucky and opened a medical practice in 1912. However, his time in Louisville reminded Bates of the systematic racism that still existed despite his advanced education. In The Chicago Defender, Dr. Bates was quoted criticizing the pastor of the local AME church he attended who had been reserving seats for the white people who came in eventually and disregarding the African American members. Bates was especially displeased at how there were only white judges to the Church events and how the church, at the direction of the pastor, would exclude African Americans from higher positions.

In 1917, the United States had joined World War I to help the Allies. The US military urged physicians to sign up due to the shortage, and when Bates was 33 years old he volunteered for service.

== Military service ==
Like the majority of the African-American recruits, Bates was sent for basic training at Fort Des Moines Provisional Army Officer Training School. He was given the rank of first lieutenant. Fort Des Moines had been opened for training African-American men as there had been a huge influx of African-American volunteers and a petition was erected by the students of Howard University. However, there was still some discontent at the facility as many soldiers found that he had been unfairly assessed for merely being black. After being trained, Bates was assigned to the 368th Ambulance Company of the 317th Sanitary (Medical Train) of the 92nd Division.

The division was sent over to France to assist the Allied troops there, as General Pershing did not want to utilize the African-American soldiers. The French were extremely relieved at the reinforcements as the Germans were hitting them aggressively. Soon after arriving in France, Dr. Bates's surgical abilities were questioned by the lieutenant colonel. According to records, Bates had scored around 50% on his military and medical subjects back in the United States, which made the lieutenant colonel want to reevaluate Bates before sending him into the field. Bates retook the exam and proved his ability and was soon sent over to the Gas Defense School. The troops in France were facing repeated gas attacks from the Germans. In early October 1918, a couple weeks before the war ended, the entire division was sent over to the Marbache sector in France and faced an aggressive assault by the Germans. Lieutenant Bates proved his capability during the attack. In the Meharry Annual report of 1919, it stated:

                                  "It was Lieut. Bates, of Louisville, K.y., with twenty of his best ambulance corps men, who carried Captain Kennedy's gassed, wounded, and dying under shell fire, from the Aid Station to the Ambulance station.  For his meritorious work, Captain Kennedy, the following day, recommended Lieut. Bates for the D.S.C and his other men cited in General Orders."[8]

Bates was also credited in the January 1919, Army and Navy Journal for his efforts:

                                  "1st December, 1918,
                                  II.  The Division Commander desires to commend in orders of meritorious conduct in action as specified below, the following officers and enlisted men below:
                                  ...........
                                  1st Lieutenant Edward Willard Bates, Medical Corps, Ambulance Co. No. 368
                                  ...........
                                                               By Command of Major General Martin
                                                               Allen J. Greer
                                                               Colonel, General Staff
                                                               Chief of Staff".[9]

When the war concluded, Dr. Bates was listed according to the Meharry alumni listings that he moved back to Louisville to continue his practice. He situated himself mostly in Jefferson County.

== Career ==
When Bates returned to civilian life and his medical practice, he experienced a heavy burden from his efforts in the war. He suffered from 'shell shock' for the remainder of his life. Later, Bates and his wife moved to Chicago, Illinois, and became very involved in the Baptist Church nearby.

== Death ==
Bates died unexpectedly in his home on August 7, 1930. It was reported in the Chicago Defender that Dr. Bates died of a heart attack, however an autopsy revealed that he died from a combination of mitral stenosis and nephritis (kidney disease). The article states: "Without any forewarning, Dr. Edward W. Bates, 46-year-old physician, died suddenly on Aug. 7 at his home, 5622 Prairie Ave., from a heart attack. The end came while Dr. Bates was seated at his breakfast table...." August 16, 1930

== Personal life ==
Dr. Bates married Sadie B. Bates after he returned from the war and they remained together until his death in 1930. The couple had no issue.
