= James Bailey (businessman) =

British businessman (born 1973/1974)

- Born: 1973 or 1974 (age 52–53)
- Education: Lewes Old Grammar School; Lancaster University
- Title: CEO, Waitrose
- Spouse: Emma
- Children: 2

James Bailey (born 1973/1974) is the executive director (CEO) of the UK's Waitrose supermarket chain.

Bailey was educated at Lewes Old Grammar School, and Lancaster University.

Bailey began his career as a management trainee in the National Health Service (NHS) for three years, followed by three years in financial services. He worked for Sainsbury's for 18 years, rising to grocery buying director, before leaving in 2019.

Bailey joined Waitrose in April 2020 as its executive director (CEO). He replaced former MD Rob Collins, who left in January.

He is married to Emma, and they have two children.
