= Scott Bailey =

Scott Bailey may refer to:

- Scott Bailey (ice hockey) (born 1972), ice hockey player
- Scott Bailey (actor) (born 1978), American actor
- Scott Bailey (curler) (born 1970), Canadian curler
- Scott Bailey (bishop) (1916–2005), bishop of the Episcopal Diocese of West Texas
- Arthur Scott Bailey (1877–1949), American writer
- The 1755 edition of A New Universal Etymological English Dictionary by Nathan Bailey

== See also ==
- Scott & Bailey, British detective drama series that debuted on ITV on 29 May 2011
