= Dennis Bailey =

Dennis Bailey may refer to:

- Dennis Bailey (designer), RDI-awarded illustrator/designer
- Dennis Bailey (footballer, born 1935), English association football player
- Dennis Bailey (footballer, born 1965), English association football player
- Dennis Bailey (politician), American politician
- Dennis Bailey (rugby league) (born 1966), rugby league footballer of the 1990s
