= Attorney General Bailey =

Attorney General Bailey may refer to:

- Andrew Bailey (politician) (born 1981), Attorney General of Missouri
- Carl E. Bailey (1894–1948), Attorney General of Arkansas
- William Henry Bailey (1831–1908), Attorney General of North Carolina

== See also ==
- Douglas Baily (born 1937), Attorney General of Alaska
- General Bailey (disambiguation)
