= Elaine French =

American politician

Member of New Hampshire House of Representatives for Grafton 14
- In office December 5, 2018 – December 2, 2020
- Preceded by: Brad Bailey
- Succeeded by: Matthew Simon

Personal details
- Party: Democratic

Elaine H. French is an American politician. She was a member of the New Hampshire House of Representatives.

In 2020, she endorsed the Elizabeth Warren 2020 presidential campaign.
