= Colin Bailey =

Colin Bailey may refer to:

- Colin Bailey (drummer) (1934–2021), British-born American jazz drummer
- Colin Bailey (engineer) (born 1967), British structural engineer
- Drums of Death (musician), real name Colin Bailey, British electronic musician
- Colin Bailey (police officer) (born 1943), British constable
- Colin Bailey (mountain biker) (born 1979), American cyclist in the 1999 UCI Mountain Bike World Cup
- Colin B. Bailey (born 1955), British–American museum director
- Col Bailey (1937–2022), Australian naturalist and thylacine enthusiast
