= Ted Bates =

Ted Bates may refer to:

- Ted Bates (American football) (1936–2021), American football player
- Ted Bates (footballer) (1918–2003), English footballer and manager with Southampton F.C.
- Ted Bates (executive) (1901–1972), American advertising executive and founder of Bates Worldwide
- Ted Bates (advertising firm), an advertising agency founded by Ted Bates in 1940
- Ted Bates (politician) (1926–2011), mayor of Warren, Michigan

== See also ==
- Edward Bates (disambiguation)
