= Arthur Bailey =

Arthur Bailey may refer to:

- Arthur Bailey (rower) (1881–1961), Canadian rower
- Arthur Bailey (footballer) (1914–2006), English footballer
- Arthur Bailey (architect) (1903–1979), British architect
- Arthur Scott Bailey (1877–1949), American writer
