= Benjamin Bailey =

Benjamin Bailey may refer to:

- Benjamin Franklin Bailey (1875–after 1954), American inventor of the capacitor
- Benjamin Bailey (missionary) (1791–1871), British missionary in India
- Benjamin H. Bailey (1823–1919), American Unitarian minister
- Ben Bailey (born 1970), American game show host

== See also ==
- Benny Bailey (1925–2005), American jazz trumpeter
- Benjamin Bayly (1671–1720), English divine
- Benjamin Bailly (born 1990), Belgian racing driver
