= Donald Bailey =

Donald Bailey may refer to:

- Sir Donald Bailey (civil engineer) (1901–1985), British civil engineer
- Donald A. Bailey (1945–2020), American politician and lawyer
- Donald Bailey (musician) (1934–2013), American jazz drummer
- Donald Bailey (architect), Australian architect
- Donald Bailey (Manitoba politician)
- Don Bailey (American football) (born 1961), American football player
- Duke Bailey (1933–2010), American football player
