= Bailie (given name) =

Bailie and Bailee are English feminine given names, and variant spellings of Bailey. Notable people with these names include:

- Bailie Key (born 1999), American artistic gymnast
- Bailee Madison (born 1999), American actress

== See also ==
- Bailie (surname)
- Baillie (surname)
- Bayly
