= Eric Bailey (basketball) =

Basketball player and motivational speaker

Eric Bailey (born 26 November 1960) is a former basketball player with the Hobart Devils, Melbourne Tigers and Gold Coast Rollers in the National Basketball League (NBL).

Bailey attended Boise State University. He played in the Australian NBL for Hobart between 1983 and 1984. In 1985, he moved to Melbourne where he played until 1989. In 1990, he transferred to Gold Coast where he stayed until 1991.

As of March 2023, Bailey is a motivational speaker who visits schools or corporations to deliver anti-drug and visionary messages.
