= Jackson Bailey =

American historian (1925–1996)

Jackson Holbrook Bailey (1925 – August 2, 1996) was an American historian who specialized in Japanese history, culture, and Japanese-American relations. Bailey was a professor of history at Earlham College from 1959 until his retirement in June 1994.

== Life and career ==
Born in Portland, Maine, Bailey attended Earlham College, graduating in 1950. After completing a PhD. at Harvard University in Asian history and languages, Bailey returned to Earlham in 1959, as a faculty member in the department of history. He was fluent in Japanese and studied at several eminent Japanese universities, including the University of Kyoto and the University of Tokyo. Among his most notable accomplishments, Bailey founded the Institute for Education on Japan. Based at Earlham, the Institute provides an academic program for majoring in Japanese Studies. Bailey also founded the Assistant English Teaching Program, which over the last two decades of his life sent approximately 170 youthful college graduates to the northeastern Japanese region of [Tohoku] to teach English to Japanese junior high school students. Finally, Bailey also founded the Center for Educational Media (CEM) in 1992; this program was renamed the Asian Educational Media Service and is now located at the University of Illinois.

Bailey wrote and edited many articles and textbooks on Japan and the Japanese; among the textbooks were Listening to Japan (1973) and Ordinary People, Extraordinary Lives (1991). He also produced several documentaries on Japan for Public Broadcasting Service television, most notable the nationally telecast Japan: The Living Tradition and Japan: The Changing Tradition. The DVD As Iwate goes-- is culture local? foregrounds several questions of social change through the lens of his long relationships with the people of Iwate Prefecture in the northeast part of the main Japanese island.

Bailey was also the subject of a documentary in the Voices of Experience series produced by the Media Production Group, a part of the Asian Educational Media Service. In the documentary, Bailey speaks on rice-roots responses to four decades of social change, as depicted in his book on regional development in a community in Northeastern Japan, Ordinary People, Extraordinary Lives.

Bailey died on August 2, 1996, in Brattleboro, Vermont at the age of 70 years. He and his wife, Caroline, had moved to Vermont after his retirement in 1994.

== Honors ==
In 1988 the Japanese government decorated Bailey with the Order of the Sacred Treasure. This was in recognition of his contributions to increasing understanding between Japan and the United States.

Bailey was also honored with Honorary doctorate degrees from Haverford College in Pennsylvania, Wabash College in Indiana, the College of Wooster in Ohio, and Waseda University in Japan. He was awarded the 1996 Franklin Buchanan Award from the Association for Asian Studies in recognition of his "commitment to the development of innovative teaching materials and contributions to the development of teachers at all levels". Bailey was awarded the Eugene Asher Distinguished Teaching Award from the American Historical Association in 1991; a Richmond Citizen of the Year, awarded by the Chamber of Commerce in 1987 for his work in attracting Japanese business investment to the area; and the Outstanding Alumni Award from Earlham College in June 1996.
