= Albert William Bailey =

American Christian missionary (1873–1955)

- Church: Christian and Missionary Alliance; South African General Mission

Personal details
- Born: 1873 Maine
- Died: 1955 (aged 81–82)
- Occupation: Missionary and minister

Albert William Bailey (1873–1955) was an American missionary to Southern Africa. He served as a minister in New York and as a missionary to lumber camps in Maine before joining the South African General Mission in 1909. Bailey established missions in Rhodesia before moving to Portuguese Angola in 1914. He worked to translate the Bible into the Mbunda language before his resignation in 1948.

== Biography ==
Albert William Bailey was born in Maine in 1873. He worked as a minister in New York before joining the Christian and Missionary Alliance to serve as a missionary at lumber camps in his home state. Bailey travelled to South Africa in 1909 as part of the South African General Mission to Durban.

In 1910 he accompanied the leader of the General Mission, Frederick Stanley Arnot, to Kaondeland (in Rhodesia, modern-day Zambia) at his request as part of an initiative to spread Christianity into the upper reaches of the Zambezi River. Later that year he established a mission at Chisalala and another at Lalafuta two years later. In 1913 the General Mission decided to expand into the neighbouring Portuguese colony of Angola. Bailey crossed into Angola in 1914 and constructed a temporary house on the banks of the Luanginga River, in an area where no missionaries had operated before.

Bailey was keen to translate the bible into the local language, Mbunda, and sat on a translation committee that worked towards this. Bailey personally translated the Gospel of John into Mbunda in 1916 and ordered the printing of copies of this at Kamundongo in 1919.

In 1917 Bailey had established a mission at Muye in Angola. The Plymouth Brethren's Christian Mission in Many Lands began operations in the region in 1921 and the Southern African General Mission and Bailey co-operated closely with them.

Bailey published the autobiographical Commission and Conquest in South Africa in South Carolina in 1928. He resigned from missionary work in 1948 and died in 1955.
