= Clipper Darrell =

Los Angeles Clippers superfan

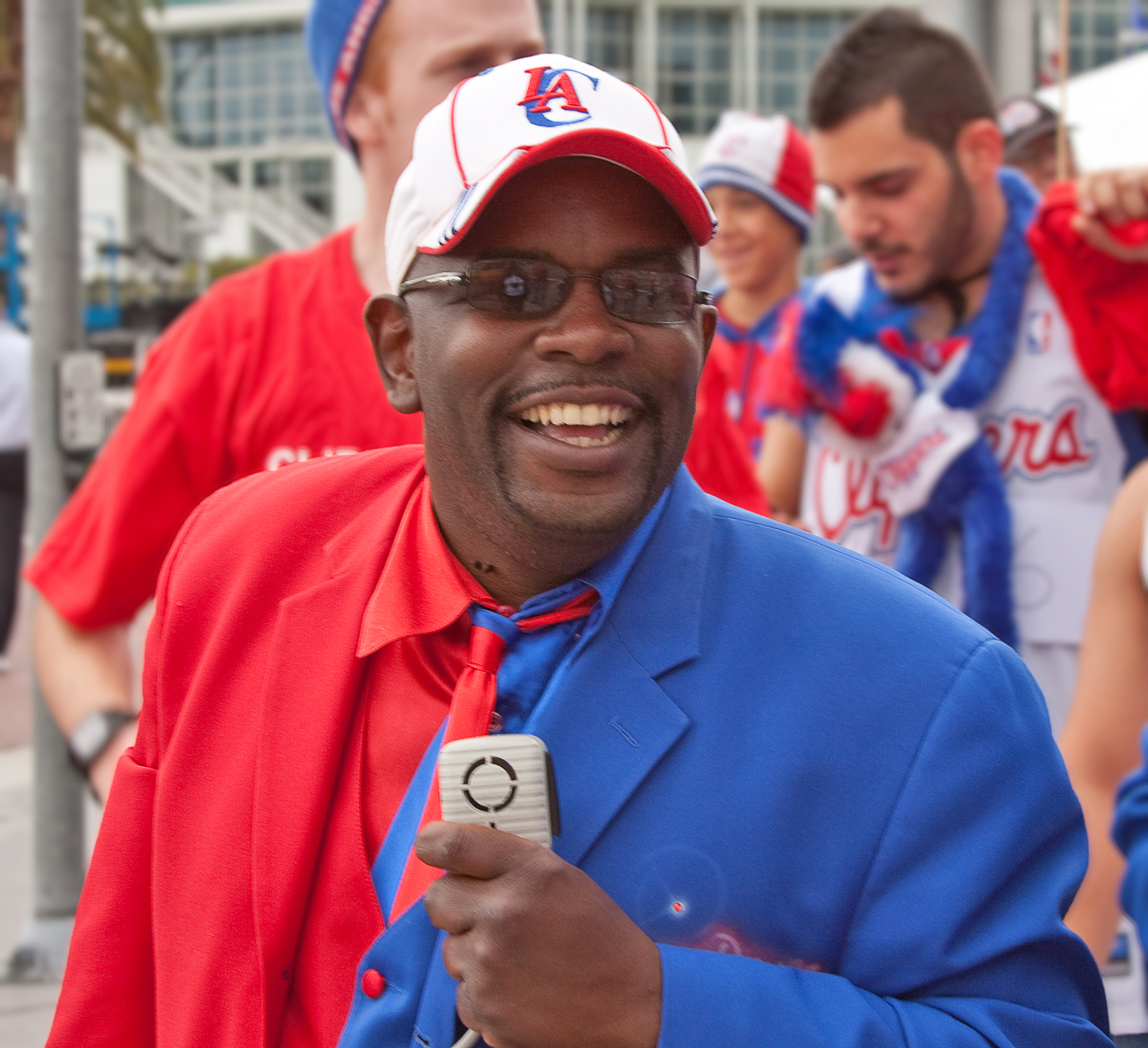
- Clipper Darrell in 2010.
- Born: Darrell Bailey; 1967 or 1968 (age 57–58)
- Website: clipperdarrell.com

Darrell Bailey (born 1967 or 1968), better known as Clipper Darrell, is a superfan of the Los Angeles Clippers and has been described as of the few remaining clean hecklers in the National Basketball Association. A season ticket holder since the 2000–01 season, Clipper Darrell is well-known fans for leading cheers and loudly trash talking the other team with taunts. One of his personal favorites is, "U-G-L-Y, you ain’t got no alibi, you ugly!", which he directs at opposing players when they shoot free throws.

== Early life and career ==
Bailey grew up in South Los Angeles and was known as a jokester in his youth. As a young adult he dropped out of community college and had stints working at Carls, Jr. and with disabled children before a memorable incident in 1984 when he was fired from a pager and cellphone store. In an angry outburst, his former boss said he was "never going to amount to nothing". Bailey went home feeling upset and when a Clippers game came on TV, he heard an announcer speak about the Clippers in a way that his boss had spoken to him. Bailey decided to become a fan: "I said to myself, 'This is going to be my team. We are going to ride and die together, me and the Clippers'", he told The New York Times.

His dancing was featured on the Jumbotron and captured the crowd's attention, inspiring a bolder persona at Clippers games. He was originally known as Dancing Man before changing to Clipper Darrell after a few radio appearances. The New York Times called him "the team’s unofficial biggest fan". The Wall Street Journal wrote, "He’s perhaps the only superfan in the history of the Los Angeles Clippers." He attended 386 consecutive games until the streak was broken by a trip to the hospital for high blood pressure in 2010.

Bailey says he was approached at a Clippers game by Mark Cuban, owner of the Dallas Mavericks, who offered him a job as a professional Mavericks fan in Dallas. He felt loyal to the Clippers but visited Texas to consider the idea, later explaining "it isn’t every day that a billionaire knocks on your door. I had to fly out and listen." In 2006, Bailey was at the airport to wish the Clippers well as they departed to Phoenix for Game 7 of the Western Conference semifinals. Though Bailey had plans to drive to the game with friends, then-owner Donald Sterling invited him onto the team plane, and he traveled with the team.

=== Taunts ===
Bailey has been known to trash talk opponents with G-rated taunts. His jeers are sometimes personal, such as "who are you?" and "you’re weak, you’re no good and you can’t be traded" if a free-throw shooter is an inexperienced reserve player. He views each opposing player as his "enemy" but only during gameplay, saying "after 48 minutes, we good" and feels that obscenity in trash talk crosses a line. Bailey has been known to ridicule fellow hecklers who are foul-mouthed.

=== Relationship with the Clippers organization ===
Bailey is not an employee of the Clippers organization. In February 2012, the Clippers approached him with concerns about his use of Clippers in the name "Clipper Darrell" and warnings against representing the Clippers organization in appearances or statements. On February 29, 2012, Bailey made a post on his website titled "I AM DEVASTATED!!!" saying that the Clippers "no longer want me to be Clipper Darrell" and that he felt "stripped of my identity". In a statement, the Clippers said its concern was Bailey's "inappropriate" use of team trademarks for "unmonitored commercial gain". By mid-March 2012, Bailey reached an agreement with the Clippers to notify staff before publicly appearing as "Clipper Darrell". The team's actions were criticized as tone deaf.

In 2014, former Clippers co-owner Shelly Sterling received the title of "Clippers Number One Fan” as part of the sales agreement with incoming owner Steve Ballmer. Yahoo! Sports opined that Clipper Darrell was "the Clippers No. 1 fan, no matter what official documents say."

== Personal life ==
Bailey has a wife and four children, and works as an automobile broker. He attends church and has said that "going to Clippers games and going to church are the two things I can do to get away from the world".

Bailey drives a 1995 BMW 740i painted in a Clippers' red, white, and blue color scheme and outfitted with custom CLIPERD license plates as well as autographs and a Clippers logo on the hood. Clipper Darrell's home in Los Angeles is painted in the team's colors, and has a custom Clippers basketball court in the driveway. The front door is red, and the living room is white and blue, with Clippers logos prominent from the walls to the floor tiles.
