= Ian Bailey (footballer) =

English footballer (born 1956)

Personal information
- Full name: Ian Craig Bailey
- Date of birth: 20 October 1956 (age 70)
- Place of birth: Middlesbrough, England
- Position: Defender

Senior career*
Years	Team	Apps	(Gls)
1975–1982	Middlesbrough	144	(1)
1976	→ Doncaster Rovers (loan)	9	(0)
1977	→ Carlisle United (loan)	7	(1)
1982	→ Bolton Wanderers (loan)	5	(0)
1982–1984	Sheffield Wednesday	35	(0)
1984	→ Blackpool (loan)	3	(0)
1984–1985	Bolton Wanderers	10	(0)
Total		213	(2)
- * Club domestic league appearances and goals

Ian Craig Bailey (born 20 October 1956) is an English former professional footballer who played as a defender. He played for several clubs in the Football League. He later worked as physiotherapist to Rotherham United.
