= Malcolm Bailey (footballer, born 1937) =

English footballer

Personal information
- Date of birth: 7 May 1937
- Place of birth: Halifax, England
- Date of death: 2016 (aged 78–79)
- Place of death: Kirklees, England
- Position: Wing half

Senior career*
Years	Team	Apps	(Gls)
1957–1959	Bradford Park Avenue	10	(1)
1959–1960	Accrington Stanley	2	(0)
1960–1961	Barnsley	0	(0)
Total		12	(1)
- * Club domestic league appearances and goals

Malcolm Bailey (7 May 1937 – 2016) was an English professional footballer who played as a wing half for Bradford Park Avenue and Accrington Stanley in the Football League. He was born in Halifax.
