= Steven Bailey =

Steve, Steven or Stephen Bailey may refer to:

- Steve Bailey (born 1960), American musician
- Steve Bailey (baseball) (born 1942), American baseball player
- Steven Bailey (zoologist), a zoologist published under the ICZN
- Steven John Bailey, real name of Steven Severin (born 1955), English musician
- Steven W. Bailey (born 1971), American actor
- Stephen Bailey (born 1986), English comedian and television presenter

== See also ==
- Steven Bayley (born 1971), New Zealand alpine skier
- Stephen Bayley (born 1951), Welsh writer and critic
- Stephen Bayly (born 1942), American film producer
