= New Democratic Party of Manitoba candidates in the 1990 Manitoba provincial election =

The New Democratic Party of Manitoba fielded a full slate of candidates in the 1990 provincial election, and won 20 seats out of 57 to form the Official Opposition in the legislature. Many of the party's candidates have their own biography pages; information about others may be found here.

== Shirley Lord (Fort Garry) ==
Shirley Lord is a community organizer and activist. She was a nurse from 1970 to 1981, and fought for pay equity between aids and orderlies. She was also active with the Canadian Union of Public Employees (CUPE), and eventually chaired the CUPE Manitoba and Manitoba Federation of Labour political Action Committees. She was hired by CUPE as a full-time employee in 1991. She also served as chairwoman of the Village Clinic Board, where she campaigned for medical patients to be granted legal access to cannabis to alleviate pain. She was a Winnipeg board member of the Council of Canadians and a prominent member of the Winnipeg social policy group CHO!CES. Lord was in Seattle during the 1999 protests against the World Trade Organization, and indicated that she was tear-gassed by police while walking through a fish market. She described the police actions against protesters on this occasion as "right out of control", and compared the scene to protests against the Vietnam War in the 1960s.

She was the provincial New Democratic Party's president during the 1980s, and was campaign manager for Bill Blaikie's first political campaign in 1979. She has been a New Democratic Party candidate on two occasions.

Lord relocated to Kampala, Uganda in 2004, where she helped in fundraising for orphans and worked with the National Union of Persons with Disabilities through Volunteer Services Oversees (VSO). In 2007, she began a six-month VSO placement with the Christian Relief and Development Association in Addis Ababa, Ethiopia.

Electoral record
Election	Division	Party	Votes	%	Place	Winner
provincial by-election, 2 October 1984	Fort Garry	New Democratic Party	1,211		3/5	Charles Birt, Progressive Conservative
1990 provincial	Fort Garry	New Democratic Party	1,500	13.83	3/4	Rosemary Vodrey, Progressive Conservative

== Donald A. Bailey (Osborne) ==
Bailey is a professor of History at the University of Winnipeg. He is the author of Canada’s constitutional troubles: what can we learn from European history?, published by the University of Winnipeg Press in 1991.

In the aftermath of the 1995 Quebec referendum, Bailey called for Quebec to be recognized as a distinct society within Canada. He wrote that Canadians should "cease the rhetoric of alienation" against Quebec, and "stop denying to Quebec formal recognition of its special status, a recognition that will not harm English Canada one iota". In 1997, he wrote a work supporting the principle of sovereignty for First Nations communities in Canada.

Bailey has been a president of the Manitoba Association for Rights and Liberties (MARL). He criticized the provincial government's plan to introduce a welfare fraud hotline in 1995, saying that anonymous snitch lines were inappropriate in a free society. The following year, he was awarded the Clarence Atchison Award for Excellence in Community Service.

He received 2,861 votes (29.19%) in the 1990 election, finishing second against Liberal incumbent Reg Alcock.
