= Roy Bailey =

Roy Bailey may refer to:

- Roy Bailey (politician) (1928–2018), Canadian Progressive Conservative (formerly social credit) politician from Saskatchewan
- Roy Bailey (folk singer) (1935–2018), British sociologist and folk singer
- Roy Bailey (footballer, born 1932) (1932–1993), English footballer
- Roy Bailey (Australian footballer) (1889–1935), Australian rules footballer
- Roy Bailey (athlete), Jamaican athlete
