= Mark Bailey =

Mark Bailey may refer to:

- Mark Bailey (diplomat) (1951–2021), Canadian diplomat
- Mark Bailey (American football) (born 1954), American football running back
- Mark Bailey (rugby union) (born 1960), English rugby player, headmaster and professor of Later Medieval History
- Mark Bailey (baseball) (1961–2026), American catcher in Major League Baseball
- Mark Bailey (conductor) (born 1962), conductor and composer of Slavic sacred music
- Mark Bailey (cricketer) (born 1970), New Zealand cricketer
- Mark Bailey (footballer) (born 1976), former professional football defender
- Mark Bailey (politician) (born 1968), Australian politician
- Mark Bailey (writer) (born 1968), American writer
- Bill Bailey (born 1965), real name Mark Bailey, British comedian
- Mark Bailey, a personal trainer on the British TV series The Biggest Loser
