= Death of Allison Bailey =

American whistleblower who died six weeks after discharge from the Nevada National Guard

American former Sergeant First Class (SFC) Allison Bailey died on March 4, 2023, at age 33, after serving in the Nevada National Guard for 17 years and having been discharged from the Guard six weeks prior to her death.

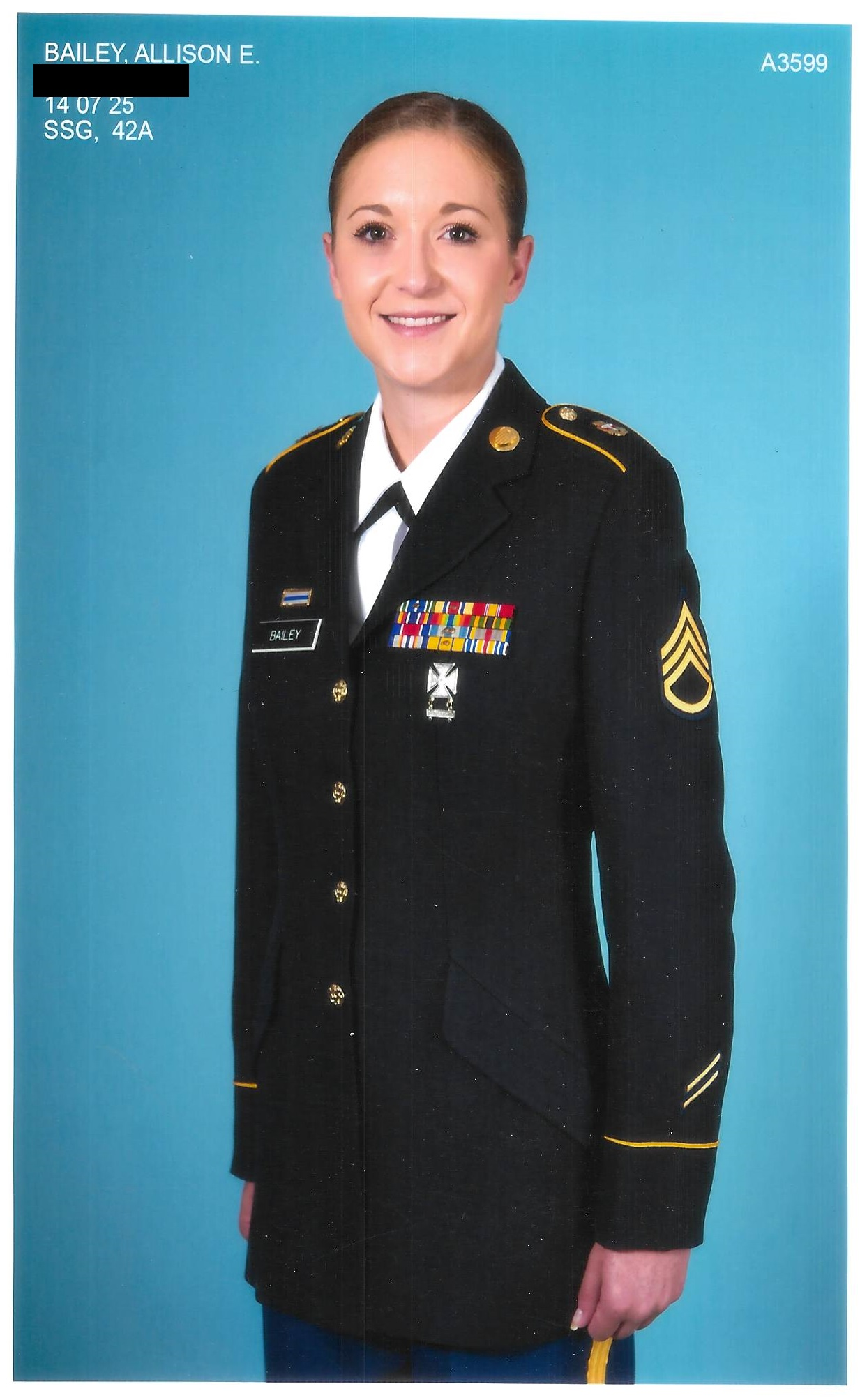
Allison Bailey's DA photo from 2014

Her discharge followed events after her blowing the whistle on bullying and a toxic work environment in the Guard in September 2020 and subsequent actions by the Guard in alleged retaliation against her in a misconduct investigation launched against her in December 2020. In January 2021 Bailey was pressured to report an alleged sexual assault incident by a subordinate soldier at an event with her unit. The sexual assault was referred to the Nevada Department of Public Safety, which could not secure enough evidence against the alleged attacker and closed the case in June 2021 due to "insufficient evidence for prosecution". Following the closure of the sexual assault investigation, the Nevada National Guard resumed its misconduct investigation, which resulted in a misconduct finding in a non-judicial hearing in September 2021.

Bailey held an exemplary military record, rising to the rank of Sergeant first class, and being the senior noncommissioned officer at her unit stationed in Nevada up to the point of her whistleblowing report. Following her report, and the subsequent investigations by the Nevada National Guard, Bailey's health deteriorated. Bailey requested a medical disability discharge evaluation in 2022, which was denied. Subsequently, a separation hearing was held instead, and she was removed from the Guard on January 15, 2023, in an "other than honorable discharge".

Bailey died six weeks later on March 4, 2023. Following Bailey's death, her case received in-depth news coverage and led to calls for a Department of Defense (DoD) investigation into the case, as well as several other victims of sexual assault and retaliation in response to whistleblowing coming forward.

In January 2025, Felicia Cavanagh, Bailey's mother, filed a lawsuit on constitutional grounds against the State of Nevada, the Nevada National Guard and principal members of the Guard that were involved in Bailey's case, alleging wrongful death as a result of Bailey having been denied the right to a fair trial in a court-martial.

The case sparked introduction of Nevada Senate Bill 95 in 2025, which would restore Nevada National Guard members right to a court-martial instead of being limited to a non-judicial punishment to allow them due process as guaranteed by the Constitution of the United States.

== Background ==
=== Career in the Nevada National Guard ===
Allison Bailey joined the Nevada National Guard at age 17 after finishing high school at North Valleys High School. Following her enlistment, Bailey spent the next 16 years in the Guard, rising through the ranks to Sergeant first class (SFC) and became the senior noncommissioned officer at her unit stationed in Las Vegas.

=== Alleged sexual assault ===
Former Sergeant first class (SFC) Allison Bailey was the victim of an alleged sexual assault in the summer of 2020 when Bailey attended an event with her unit where she was allegedly sexually assaulted by a subordinate soldier.

Bailey did not report the assault at the time, but told her boyfriend, Sam Boyd, two months later about the incident. He stated that "She was very hesitant to report the sexual assault."

=== Whistleblowing report ===
In September 2020, Bailey blew the whistle in filing an inspector general (IG) complaint for bullying and a toxic work environment at the Nevada National Guard. The complaint followed the allegedly drugging and sexual assault by a subordinate soldier earlier that year. Following the, at the time unreported, incident, Bailey was ordered to serve as a performance evaluator for her alleged attacker. Following the order, Bailey requested a transfer away from the chain of command under Major Laurie Macafee who issued the order, and then pursued the IG complaint filing.

Bailey's military evaluation records at the time highlighted that she was a "natural born leader with unlimited potential", "highly capable" and should be "promoted ahead of her peers" to First sergeant (1SG) at the level of E-8 "as soon as possible". Capt. Emerson Marcus of the Nevada National Guard described her as "a well-regarded member of the Nevada National Guard for more than a decade."

== Events following the whistleblowing report ==
In January 2021, under the direction of Major General Ondra Berry, the Nevada National Guard launched a zero-tolerance campaign against sexual assault.

=== Misconduct investigation against Bailey ===
Following Bailey's filing of the September IG complaint, Major Laurie Macafee, her superior in the chain of command, held a session with soldiers in December 2020 to collect complaints against Bailey. Following the session, on January 4, 2021, the Nevada National Guard launched an article 15 misconduct investigation against Bailey. Las Vegas TV station KTNV inquired with the Guard about the case in relation to Bailey's own whistleblower report from months prior and received a response from the Guard that "claims the two investigations were unrelated." The Nevada National Guard used the reported sexual encounter as the No. 1 charge of "Sex with a subordinate" in the alleged 22-item misconduct investigation against Bailey. In a statement to KTNV, Chris Tinsman, Bailey's military-appointed attorney, stated "It's as clear-cut a case of retaliation that I've ever seen, she was a high flier, she was universally regarded as one of the best in all of Southern Nevada." Tinsman had known and worked with Bailey for several years prior to being appointed as her attorney for the misconduct charges.

=== Sexual assault investigation ===
After initially not intending to come forward about the sexual assault, Bailey inadvertently disclosed the assault in a conversation with her Equal Opportunity adviser, who was a mandatory reporter who told her that they would have to file a report on her behalf if she did not file it herself. Bailey filed an official report on it three weeks after the misconduct investigation against her was opened. The Nevada National Guard referred the sexual assault allegations to the state Department of Public Safety (DPS), who received the case on February 2, 2021.

The alleged attacker claimed that the encounters were consensual and shared screenshots of text messages reportedly supporting his claim with the DPS. Initially he agreed to allow the DPS access to his phone. But upon the formal request by Detective Kyle McKnight of the DPS to authenticate the text messages, the alleged attacker rescinded his consent and refused to hand over his phone. McKnight was forced to issue a search warrant for the phone and seized it, but the alleged attacker still refused to give the DPS his passcode, so the police office was required to do a forensic analysis of the alleged attackers phone but was unable to recover the texts.

In an email sent by Bailey in April 2021 to the adjutant general of the Nevada National Guard, Major General Berry, she wrote "I feel as if I am being punished for being sexually assaulted."

The DPS investigation was closed with no action two months later on June 9, 2021, due to "insufficient evidence for prosecution".

=== Continued misconduct investigation against Bailey ===
Following the closure of the DPS investigation that could not secure evidence for a charge against the alleged attacker, the Nevada National Guard promoted the alleged attacker in September 2021.

The screenshots of the unverified text messages shared by the alleged attacker during the DPS investigation were used as evidence against Bailey in her misconduct investigation. Bailey's attorney, Chris Tinsman, highlighted in his appeal of the misconduct findings that "the state police could not verify them and that there are numerous online services able to generate realistic-looking fake text threads."

A document recovered on Bailey's phone after her death revealed that she had requested for another investigator be assigned in the misconduct case against her as she wrote that the assigned investigator, Major Michelle Tucay, "was very good friends with (the alleged attacker) and his wife, going over for breakfast etc.,"

In September 2021, the National Guard Bureau made a finding that "adult sexual abuse" had occurred in the line of duty. The investigative report by Tucay recommended Bailey be removed from the Nevada National Guard.

Following the conclusion of the finding, the Guard demoted Bailey from her rank of Sergeant first class and level of E-7 down to Sergeant at the level of E-5.

=== Deteriorating health ===
Bailey's health deteriorated in the following months and her mother reported that she had a pancreatic mass, lesions and cysts and metabolic acidosis and was experiencing seizures. Bailey's military medical records from 2022 also showed a diagnosis for anxiety, panic attacks, depression and insomnia.

Bailey applied for a Physical Evaluation Board examination to receive medical disability, which was denied in May 2022.

A separation hearing was held, and Bailey was removed from the Guard on January 15, 2023, with an "other than honorable" discharge for a "pattern of misconduct," including "engaging in inappropriate relationships with multiple junior soldiers."

Prior to her discharge, she was demoted to E-1, the level of Private.

== Death ==
Six weeks after her discharge from the Nevada National Guard, Bailey died on March 4, 2023, at age 33 in the hospital after she was found collapsed on her kitchen floor by her two sons. Her death certificate indicates acute cardiopulmonary arrest as the cause of death.

Dwight Stirling, law professor at the University of Southern California, former US Army Judge Advocate General officer and founder of the Center for Law and Military Policy, a non-profit for soldiers rights, described the National Guard's filing as retaliation, saying "What, you know, is most telling to me, is that there had been no accusations of this type until she brought forth her charges, until she blew the whistle." He said that he met Bailey a bit over a month before she died and added that "This is the pattern that I've seen over and over again here, where the woman who brings, you know, who comes forward with the charge is really turned against."

== Legacy ==
=== Calls for change to protect soldiers' rights in Nevada ===
Bailey's mother, Felicia Cavanagh, requested all records of the investigation from the Nevada National Guard due to concerns of wrongdoing by the Guard in relation to the misconduct investigation and the handling of Bailey's denied request for a medical discharge, despite her medical condition. The nonprofit organization Veteran Sisters, which helps survivors of sexual trauma in the military, was working with Cavanagh to organize a gathering in May 2023 to advocate for "justice, transparency and systemic change within the military."

Speaking at the gathering held outside the Nevada National Guard recruiting office in Reno in May 2023, Felicia Cavanagh, Bailey's mother and an Air Force veteran, said that she fears that her daughter's case resulting in her death may dissuade other soldiers from coming forward in reporting rape. She called for an "outside organization such as the FBI should look into rape cases because the military should not be investigating itself and the military is not expert in sexual assault." Speaking at the same event, Sandy Duchac, a Navy veteran and vice president of Veteran Sisters, said "I do not believe sexual assault in the military will stop until people are held accountable" and was calling for the United States Congress to investigate the case and for the Department of Defense to implement deterrent actions and punishments for "every single person involved in sexual assault or covering it up."

On September 23, 2023, coinciding with the 5-year anniversary of Bailey's promotion to sergeant first class, a vigil was held to celebrate her service and raise awareness for justice for victims of sexual trauma in the military.

New details emerged that Bailey had requested a court-martial to adjudicate the claims against her, which was denied due to the fact that the Nevada Legislature had voted to remove the right of Nevada Guard members to have a court-martial. Nevada is the only state in the United States that limits Guard members from the right to a court-martial in lieu of a non-judicial punishment.

=== Other whistleblowers and sexual assault victims coming forward ===
==== Elizabeth Smith ====
Following news of Bailey's death, Senior airman Elizabeth Smith went public on being sexually assaulted by a superior in 2019, saying "listening to Allison Bailey's story, I felt like I was reading my story all over again." Smith said she was sexually assaulted by a senior officer in 2019 and reported the incidents in the fall of 2019, but no actions were taken initially. She then took her case to the Reno Police Department in November 2019 and received a civilian Order of protection for the sexual assault. Following the issuance of the civilian protective order, the National Guard issued a military protective order against the master sergeant that had reportedly assaulted Smith and kept them separated. The investigation by the Reno Police Department was closed due to not being able to find probable cause to bring charges against her assailant.

Smith said that following her report, she experienced a "journey of intimidation and retaliation" that brought her to the point of suicidal ideation with intent, and an active suicidal crisis that she detailed "I went to the spot where I was first sexually assaulted by my assailant, and I was going to shoot myself, but the gun wasn't there that day. And that's the only reason I'm here."

The Guard denied any wrongdoing in the investigation and reported in 2021 that the master sergeant that had reportedly assaulted her received an other-than-honorable discharge from the military due unrelated issues of adultery and fraternization.

==== Andy Lindstrom ====
Andy Lindstrom, a former U.S. Marine, serving two tours in Afghanistan until an honorable separation in 2013 and subsequent member of the Nevada National Guard from 2013 to 2021. Lindstrom faced similar retaliation to Bailey after blowing the whistle on inappropriate sexual misconduct of other service members he observed, and cover-ups of incidents involving senior officers. He left the Guard as a service member in 2021 and returned as a civilian working for the Nevada Office of the Military as an IT specialist at the Nevada Guard until he was fired in May 2022 unexpectedly. Lindstrom filed an "Appeal of Whistleblower Retaliation" with the Nevada State Personnel Commission claiming the firing was in retaliation of his earlier whistleblowing report of sexual misconduct by Guard members.

==== Ryan Sweazey ====
Former Lieutenant colonel Ryan Sweazey, an Air Force Academy graduate and fighter pilot and former Inspector General (IG) officer and founder of the non-profit Walk the Talk Foundation, a group advocating for whistleblowers, blew the whistle on workplace harassment within the Defense Intelligence Agency (DIA) IG office in 2020. After no response following his report, Sweazey took the case to Congress and published a report, including 31 witness statements, titled "Toxicity in the Defense Attache Service (DAS) and the Resultant Threat to National Security". Congress instructed the DIA to "address an environment, which was permissive for management abuses," through the National Defense Authorization Act for Fiscal Year 2022. After seeing the reporting on Bailey's case, Sweazey reached out to KTNV, retelling his story of filing an IG report and the resulting retaliation against him, saying "I reported two of my colleagues for dereliction of duty and hostile work environment, and managers from the Defense Intelligence Agency came out and committed two counts of reprisal — the first by canceling my follow on assignment, the second by writing a subpar performance report." In 2023 Swezey called for an overhaul of the IG office.

=== Wrongful death lawsuit ===
On January 26, 2025, Bailey's mother, Felicia Cavanagh, filed a lawsuit on constitutional grounds against the Nevada National Guard, alleging wrongful death as a result of Bailey having been denied a fair trial due to not being able to present her case in court-martial, and her dismissal from the Guard and resulting effects, including loss of health insurance due to the nature of the "other than honorable" discharge disqualifying Bailey for Veterans' benefits leading to Bailey's death six weeks later. The Nevada National Guard followed the 2019 changed state law, which removed the right for Guard soldiers to court-martial. The lawsuit alleges that this violates the U.S. constitutional right to a fair trial.

The suit was filed in Clark County with the Eight Judicial District Court with Cavanagh and the father of Allison's children and ex-partner Tim Duggin as plaintiffs and the principal defendants in the case being:

- State of Nevada and the Nevada National Guard
- Ondra Berry, the former leader of the Nevada National Guard who rejected Bailey's request for a medical discharge.
- Brig. Gen. Troy Armstrong, who pronounced Bailey guilty of more than 20 counts of misconduct.
- Col. Kevin Remus, who oversaw the Guard's legal interests in the misconduct case against Bailey.
- Maj. Laurie Macafee, Bailey's commander in the medical detachment unit. Bailey claimed Macafee created a hostile work environment.
- Capt. Michelle Tucay, who led the misconduct investigation against Bailey.

=== Nevada State Senate Bill 95 ===
In 2025, four sponsors, Senator Lisa Krasner, Senator Jeff Stone, Senator Roberta Lange and Senator Lori Rogich of the Nevada Senate, introduced Senate Bill 95 in response to Bailey's case. The bill was co-sponsored by two senators, Senator James Ohrenschall and Senator Julie Pazina.

Senator Lisa Krasner, Nevada Senate Whip, pointed out that "No rules of evidence apply to a non-judicial punishment, meaning hearsay and other unproven claims can be made", and that it does not afford defendants with Sixth Amendment rights to confront witnesses against them. She called out how the current process "opens the door to retaliation by commanders because the military governs every aspect of the disciplinary process." The bill, if passed, would restore Nevada Guard members the right to request a court-martial that was rescinded in 2019.

Chris Tinsman, Bailey's former attorney, appeared as a guest, alongside Andy Lindstrom, former U.S. Marine and member of the Nevada National Guard, who faced similar retaliation after blowing the whistle in the podcast Stories of Service with host, author and U.S. Navy officer Theresa Carpenter, talking about restoring military justice and Senate Bill 95.

Colonel Kevin Remus, the judge-advocate for the Nevada National Guard, pushed back against the bill, saying that "due process is already afforded through the guard's internal disciplinary process, and that the cost of allowing a court martial option would be too high." Senator Krasner and others testifying at a Senate hearing and in writing rejected the Guard's claim as a "necessary check and balance on the military's control of guard member discipline."

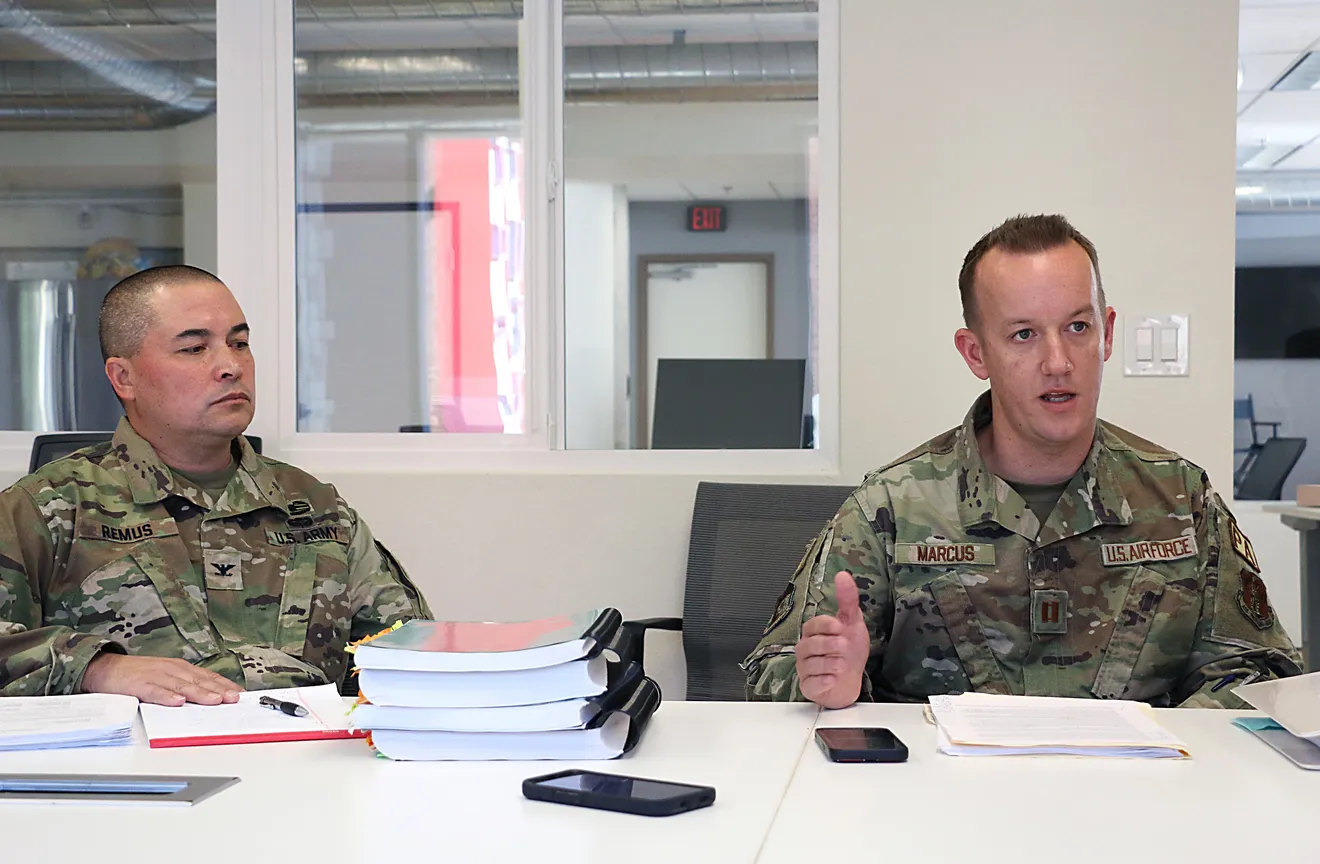
State Judge Advocate COL Remus and PAO Captain Emerson Marcus
