= Anne Bailey (ten-pin bowling) =

British-born ten-pin bowling champion

Anne Mary Bailey (born 1 June 1951) is a British-born ten-pin bowling champion. She is best known for winning the Bronze medal in the 1972 AMF World Cup tournament, held in Hamburg, West Germany.

Bailey was born in Kent, England, but relocated to Hong Kong, China as a child. A full-time secretary by trade, she became a local bowling phenomenon around the country, which was under British rule at the time. Along with her father Bill Bailey (born 1919—d. 1979), the "father-and-daughter" team were local celebrities throughout the Asian as well as English bowling community.

== AMF Bowling World Cup ==
Bailey's fame led to her inclusion in the AMF Bowling World Cup tournament in 1972. Representing Hong Kong, Bailey was one of three women who took "one giant step for womankind," as the media reported. For the first time in bowling history, female bowlers joined males in the World Cup competition. Mexico's grandmotherly Irma Urrea won the Gold Medal in the tournament, followed by Silver medalist Oy Sri-Saard of Thailand. In contrast with her older opponents, Bailey was just 21 at the time of the tournament, of which she won the Bronze Medal.

Upon her return trip to China, Bailey arrived at Kai Tak Airport in Hong Kong and was treated "like royalty," as she put it in 2008. "It was such a wonderful experience."

Bailey retired from the sport in the late 1990s. During her career, she bowled with a 15-pound ball, complete with a semi-fingertipped grip.

== Personal life ==
Bailey currently resides in the Kent, England, and goes by her married name of Anne Huddleston. She has one daughter. Bailey looks back on her bowling career with great fondness, and is proud to have been a part of "making history."

== Achievements ==
=== AMF World Cup ===
- Semi-finals Women - 6 games. Best finish: 3rd place, 1085 total
- Quarter finals Women - 7 games. Best finish: 3rd place, 1332 total
- Average: 183

=== Final Standings - Women ===
1. Irma Urrea, Mexico
2. Oy Sri-Saard, Thailand
3. Anne Bailey, Hong Kong
