= Barbara Bailey =

Barbara Bailey may refer to:

- Barbara Bailey (artist) (1910–2003), English nun and original illustrator of the "Bunnykins" tableware
- Barbara Bailey (writer) (born 1942), Jamaican educator and gender studies advocate
- Barbara Bailey (politician) (born 1944), American politician
- Barbara Bailey (Connecticut Four), American librarian
