= Kenneth Bailey =

Kenneth Bailey may refer to:

- Kenneth Bailey (lawyer) (1898–1972), Australian public servant
- Kenneth D. Bailey (1910–1942), United States Marine Corps officer
- Kenneth D. Bailey (sociologist) (born 1943), American sociologist
- Kenneth E. Bailey (1930–2016), author, professor in theology and linguist
- Kenneth E. R. Bailey (1986–2025), American rapper better known by his stage name Young Scooter
