= Alexander Bailey =

Alexander Bailey may refer to:

- Alexander H. Bailey (1817–1874), U.S. Representative and judge from New York
- Alexander Bailey (Wisconsin politician) (1824–1909), member of the Wisconsin State Assembly
- Alex Bailey (footballer) (born 1983), English footballer
- Alex Davison Bailey (1882–1968), American mechanical and utilities executive
