= Lewes Old Grammar School =

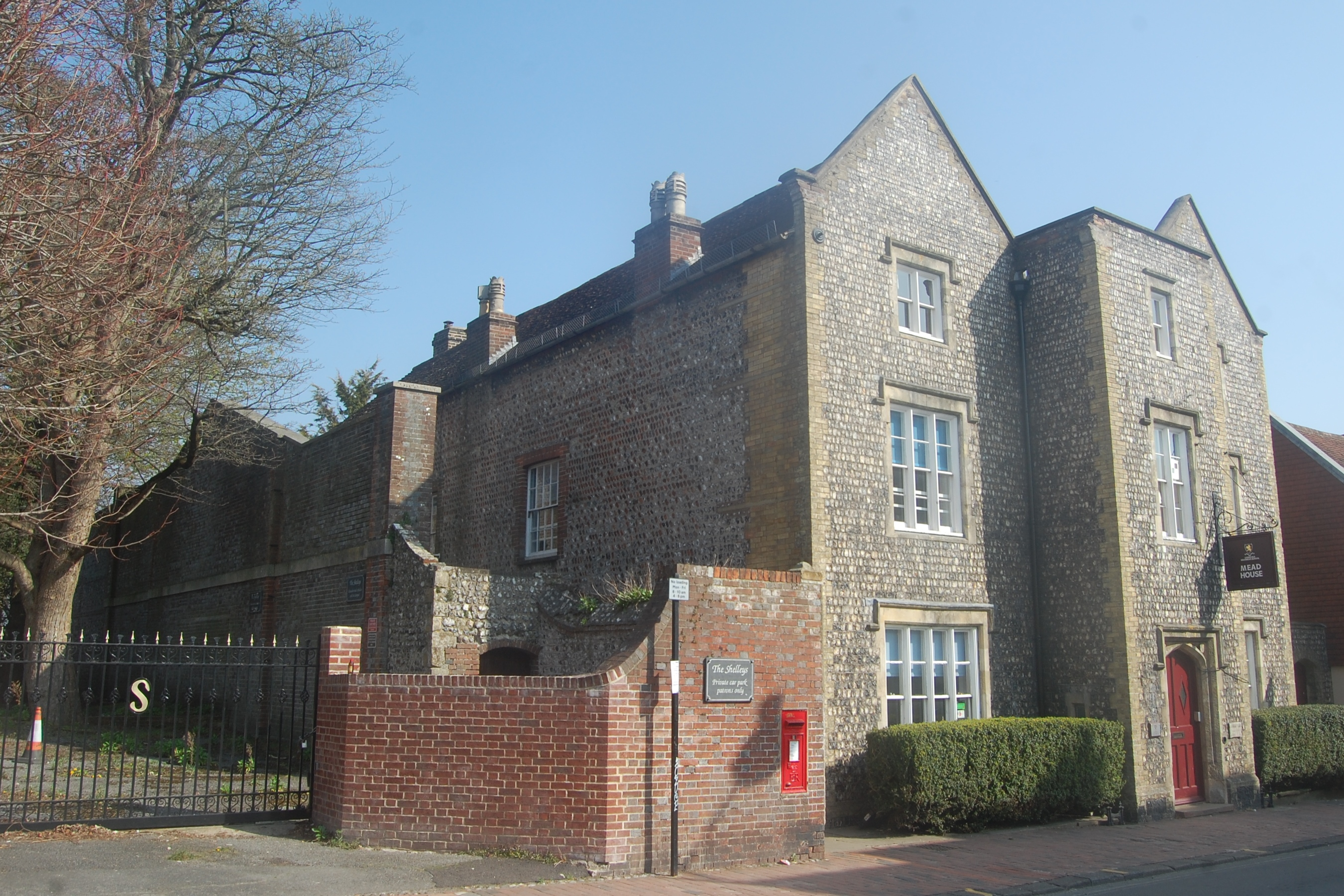

Location
- High Street; Lewes, East Sussex, BN7 1XS; England
- Coordinates: 50.87224°N 0.00525°E

Information
- Type: Private day school
- Motto: Floreat Lewys
- Established: c. 1512; 514 years ago
- Local authority: East Sussex
- Department for Education URN: 114634 Tables
- Headmaster: Robert Blewitt
- Gender: Coeducational
- Age: 3 to 18
- Enrolment: 600~ pupils
- Website: www.logs.uk.com

Lewes Old Grammar School (LOGS) in Lewes, East Sussex, is a private co-educational day school for ages three to eighteen years.

== History ==
The school was established in 1512 in Southover, Lewes. The Victoria County History for Sussex says "The history of the school from its foundation to the beginning of the eighteenth century is involved in almost impenetrable darkness". The school moved to the current site in the eighteenth century. In 1977, it merged with Lewes High School for Girls.

In November 2017, the school was the subject of an emergency no-notice inspection by the Independent Schools Inspectorate in relation to regulatory failings or concerns raised about the safeguarding of children.

== Curriculum ==
The curriculum followed includes three foreign languages (French, Spanish and German), and sciences are studied as individual subjects at senior level. Expansions to the sixth form college have allowed for the study of psychology, theatre and graphic design. They also allow the study of business, politics and Latin.

== Notable alumni ==
- John Evelyn - diarist and gardener
