= Jeremy Bailey =

Canadian new media, video, and performance artist

- Born: 1979 (age 46–47); Toronto, Ontario, Canada
- Education: Syracuse University (MFA, 2006)
- Known for: New media art, performance art, video art
- Movement: Satirical net art, post-internet art
- Website: www.jeremybailey.net

Jeremy Bailey (born 1979) is a Canadian new media, video, and performance artist. Originally from Toronto, Ontario, and later based in Calgary, Alberta, Bailey is widely recognized for his satirical alter ego, the self-proclaimed "Famous New Media Artist." Since the early 2000s, his work has navigated and critiqued developments in digital communications, consumer software, and corporate technology culture.

== Biography ==
=== Early life and education ===
Bailey was born in Toronto, Ontario, in 1979. He pursued formal training in media arts, culminating in a Master of Fine Arts from Syracuse University in 2006. Alongside his artistic practice, Bailey has worked concurrently within the technology sector as a user experience (UX) designer and creative director, serving in leadership roles at Canadian technology firms such as FreshBooks.

=== Career ===
Operating in character as the "Famous New Media Artist," Bailey produces performative videos, software systems, and interactive installations that mimic the aesthetics and rhetoric of Silicon Valley product launches and tech evangelism. The humorous surface of Bailey's work often acts as a vehicle for structural critique. Baily has extended his corporate parody to critiquing speculative software markets, mobile augmented reality platforms, and the commercialization of the metaverse. His work frequently integrates custom software and scripts to overlay real-time, digital animations onto his body. Marisa Olson characterized his practice as "often confidently self-deprecating in offering hilarious parodies of new media vocabularies." Morgan Quaintance stated that "since the early noughties Bailey has ploughed a compelling, and often hilarious, road through the various developments of digital communications technologies."

== Recognition ==
Bailey's work has been exhibited globally. His solo and group exhibitions include presentations at:

- Whitechapel Gallery in London
- ZKM Center for Art and Media
- LI-MA in Amsterdam
- MuseumsQuartier in Vienna
- Panke.Gallery in Berlin

Institutional commissions and site-specific projects have been developed for:

- New Museum in New York City
- Museum of Contemporary Art (MCA) Chicago
- Foundation for Art and Creative Technology (FACT) in Liverpool, United Kingdom
