= Nicholas Bailey (disambiguation) =

Nicholas Bailey (born 1971) is a British actor.

Nicholas Bailey or Nick Bailey may also refer to:

- Nicholas William Bailey (born 1980), American composer and songwriter
- Nick Bailey (garden designer), British garden designer and TV presenter
- Nick Bailey, a police officer poisoned whilst investigating the poisoning of Sergei and Yulia Skripal

== See also ==
- Nicky Bailey (born 1984), English footballer
- Nick Straker, born Nicholas Bailey, British musician active in the late 1970s and early 1980s
