= J. A. Bailey =

English cricketer and administrator (1930–2018)

Jack Bailey
Personal information
- Full name: Jack Arthur Bailey
- Born: 22 June 1930; Brixton, London
- Died: 12 July 2018 (aged 88)
- Batting: Right-handed
- Bowling: Right-arm fast-medium

Domestic team information
- Years: Team
- 1953–1958: Essex
- 1956–1958: Oxford University

Career statistics
Competition	First-class
Matches	112
Runs scored	641
Batting average	5.82
100s/50s	0/0
Top score	29*
Balls bowled	18,023
Wickets	347
Bowling average	21.62
5 wickets in innings	20
10 wickets in match	2
Best bowling	8/24
Catches/stumpings	67/–
- Source: Cricinfo, 21 July 2018

Jack Arthur Bailey (22 June 1930 – 12 July 2018) was an English first-class cricketer and administrator.

Born at Brixton in London in 1930, Bailey was educated at Christ's Hospital in Horsham and University College, Oxford. He played for Essex County Cricket Club and Oxford University as a tail-end right-handed batsman and a right-arm fast-medium bowler, making 112 first-class appearances between 1953 and 1958. He took 347 wickets at a bowling average of 21.62 runs per wicket. Among his many matches for Marylebone Cricket Club were tours to East Africa, South America, Canada and the United States, Holland and Denmark. Playing for MCC against Ireland in a first-class match in 1966, Bailey returned match figures of 13 for 57, taking 5 for 33 in the first innings and a career-best 8 for 24 in the second.

He succeeded Billy Griffith as Secretary of the MCC in 1974, following a spell as Assistant Secretary. He resigned in controversial circumstances in 1987, following a dispute over the ceding of further power to the Test and County Cricket Board.

Bailey wrote a biography of his Essex teammate Trevor Bailey (Trevor Bailey: A Life in Cricket, 1993) and a memoir of his time at Lord's (Conflicts in Cricket, 1989). He also wrote for The Sunday Telegraph and The Times.

He died on 12 July 2018 at the age of 88.
