= Dan Bailey (footballer) =

English footballer (1893–1967)

Personal information
- Full name: Daniel Bailey
- Date of birth: 26 June 1893
- Place of birth: East Ham, England
- Date of death: 3 April 1967 (aged 73)
- Place of death: Norwich, England
- Height: 5 ft 7 in (1.70 m)
- Position: Inside right

Senior career*
Years	Team	Apps	(Gls)
–1912	Custom House		
1912–1921	West Ham United	84	(22)
1921–1922	Charlton Athletic	33	(8)
1922–1923	Clapton Orient	18	(4)
- Margate
- * Club domestic league appearances and goals

Daniel Bailey (26 June 1893 – 3 April 1967) was an English professional football inside right who played in the Football League for West Ham United, Charlton Athletic and Clapton Orient.

Bailey began his footballing career with Custom House and joined West Ham United in 1912, for whom he made 49 appearances, scoring 13 goals, in the Southern League. After service as a private in Egypt with the Machine Gun Corps during the First World War, Bailey rejoined West Ham making 35 appearances in the club's first seasons in the Football League, and then joined Charlton Athletic in 1922, making 33 appearances and scoring eight goals. He joined Clapton Orient in July 1922, making 19 League and cup appearances, scoring four goals, in the 1922–23 season after which he joined Margate.

== Career statistics ==
Appearances and goals by club, season and competition
Club	Season	League			FA Cup		Total	
Club	Season	Division	Apps	Goals	Apps	Goals	Apps	Goals
West Ham United	1912–13	Southern League First Division	10	2	0	0	10	2
West Ham United	1913–14	Southern League First Division	19	6	4	3	23	9
West Ham United	1914–15	Southern League First Division	20	5	0	0	20	5
West Ham United	1919–20	Second Division	27	9	3	1	30	10
West Ham United	1920–21	Second Division	8	0	0	0	8	0
West Ham United	Total		84	22	7	4	91	26
Charlton Athletic	1921–22	Third Division South	33	8	0	0	33	8
Clapton Orient	1922–23	Second Division	18	4	1	0	19	4
Career total			135	34	8	4	143	38
