= Norman Bailey =

Norman Bailey may refer to:

- Norman Bailey (footballer) (1857–1923), English footballer
- Norman C. Bailey (1890–1969), American politician from Virginia
- E. Norman Bailey (fl. 1930s), British architect, particularly of cinemas
- Norman Bailey (musician) (1913–1984), American musician with the Lawrence Welk orchestra
- Norman A. Bailey (1931–2026), American senior staffer of the National Security Council
- Norman Bailey (bass-baritone) (1933–2021), British operatic bass-baritone
