= Issac Bailey =

American author

Issac Bailey is a professor at Davidson College, former columnist, and author.

== Biography ==
Bailey is a native of rural South Carolina and graduated from Davidson College in 1995. He previously wrote a regular column for The Sun News in Myrtle Beach, South Carolina. He wrote a book about his family's experiences after his older brother committed a murder and a book of essays Why Didn't We Riot? A Black Man in Trumpland. He is currently a communications professor at Davidson.

== Personal life ==
Bailey is married and has two children. His nieces are singers and actresses Chloe and Halle Bailey.

== Books ==
- Why Didn't We Riot? A Black Man in Trumpland
- My Brother Moochie: Regaining Dignity in the Face of Crime, Poverty, and Racism in the American South (2018)
