= Geoff Bailey =

British archaeologist

Geoff Bailey is a British archaeologist. He currently holds the Anniversary Chair at the University of York in England. His research interests include palaeoeconomy and the archaeology of shell middens and prehistoric coastlines as well as maritime environments as used by humans.

== Bibliography ==
- Bailey, G. N. 2004 "The Wider Significance of Submerged Archaeological Sites and Their Relevance to World Prehistory," in N. C. Flemming (ed.) Submarine Prehistoric Archaeology of the North Sea.
- Bailey, G., R. Charles, and N. Winder (eds.) 2000 Human Ecodynamics.
- Bailey, G. N. (ed.) 1997 Klithi: Palaeolithic Settlement and Quaternary Landscapes in Northwestern Greece. Vols. 1 and 2.
