= Jeannette Bailey =

British fencer

Personal information
- Born: 9 April 1931 London, England
- Died: 26 March 2008 (aged 76) Maldon, England

Sport
- Sport: Fencing

Jeannette Anne Bailey (9 April 1931 – 26 March 2008) was a British fencer. She competed in the women's team foil event at the 1960 Summer Olympics.
