= Joe Bailey (Australian footballer) =

Australian rules footballer

Personal information
- Full name: Joseph Leslie Bailey
- Born: 2 October 1921; Ceres, Victoria
- Died: 24 November 1996 (aged 75); Geelong, Victoria
- Original teams: Newtown & Chilwell
- Height: 173 cm (5 ft 8 in)
- Weight: 70 kg (154 lb)

Playing career^{1}
Years	Club	Games (Goals)
1941, 1946–49	Geelong	31 (2)
- ^{1} Playing statistics correct to the end of 1949.

Joseph Leslie Bailey (2 October 1921 – 24 November 1996) was an Australian rules footballer who played with Geelong in the Victorian Football League (VFL).

== Personal life ==
Bailey served as a corporal in the Australian Army during the Second World War.
