= Benjamin Franklin Bailey =

American electrical engineer

Benjamin Franklin Bailey (August 7, 1875 – after January 8, 1954) was an American electrical engineer.

A native of Sheridan, Michigan, Benjamin Franklin Bailey studied electrical engineering at the University of Michigan and later held the positions of chief engineer of the Fairbanks Morse Electrical Manufacturing Company and Howell Electrical Motor Company, director of Bailey Electrical Company, and vice-president and director of the Fremont Motor Corporation.

He was the author of several books on electrical engineering, including Principles of Dynamo-electric Machinery (1915).

He became professor of electrical engineering at the University of Michigan in 1913 and was department chairman from 1922 until his retirement in 1944. In the 1920s, he invented the capacitor motor.
