= Hedley Bailey =

English footballer

Personal information
- Full name: Hedley Bailey
- Date of birth: 25 June 1895
- Place of birth: Sutton-in-Ashfield, England
- Date of death: 1968 (aged 72–73)
- Position: Wing-half

Senior career*
Years	Team	Apps	(Gls)
1914–1915	Sutton Junction		
1919–1925	Rotherham County	223	(7)
1925–1928	Rotherham United	110	(5)
1928	Scunthorpe & Lindsey United		
Total		333	(12)
- * Club domestic league appearances and goals

Hedley Bailey (25 June 1895 – 1968) was an English footballer who played in the Football League for Rotherham County and Rotherham United.
