= Simon Bailey =

Simon Bailey may refer to:

- Simon Bailey (priest) (1955–1995), Anglican priest and writer
- Simon Bailey (archivist), Keeper of the Archives at the University of Oxford in England
- Simon Bailey (police officer) (born 1965), Chief Constable of the Norfolk Constabulary
- Simon Bailey (runner) (born 1980), English fell runner
- Simon Bailly, English politician
