= Andrew Bailey =

Andrew Bailey or Andy Bailey may refer to:

- Andrew Bailey (banker) (born 1959), British banker, Governor of the Bank of England
- Andrew Bailey (baseball) (born 1984), American baseball pitcher and coach
- Andrew Bailey (performance artist) (born 1947), British performance artist and comedian
- Andrew Bailey (politician), Missouri Attorney General since November 2022
- Andy Bailey (wrestler), English wrestler
- Andy Bailey, a character from Modern Family
