= Paul Bailey =

Paul Bailey may refer to:

- Paul Bailey (British writer) (1937–2024), British writer and critic
- Paul Dayton Bailey (1906–1987), American writer
- Paul Bailey (politician) (born 1968), member of the Tennessee Senate
- Paul J. Bailey (1922–2001), American Thoroughbred racing jockey
