= Dennis Bailey (rugby league) =

British rugby league player

Personal information
- Full name: Dennis Bailey
- Born: 15 February 1966 (age 60)

Playing information
- Position: Wing
Club
Years	Team	Pld	T	G	FG	P
1986–93	Dewsbury	170	90	0	0	360
1995	Bramley	4	4	0	0	16
1998	Dewsbury	22	8	0	0	32
	Total	196	102	0	0	408
- Source: As of 12 April 2012

Dennis Bailey is a former professional rugby league footballer who played in the 1990s. He played at club level for Dewsbury and Bramley, as a wing.
