= Alfred Bailey (Australian cricketer) =

Australian cricketer (1932–2016)

Personal information
- Full name: Alfred John Thomas Slater Bailey
- Born: 3 March 1932; Adelaide, South Australia
- Died: 23 July 2016 (aged 84); Sydney, New South Wales
- Batting: Right-handed
- Bowling: Right-arm fast-medium

Domestic team information
- Years: Team
- 1953/54–1955/56: South Australia

Career statistics
Competition	First-class
Matches	3
Runs scored	14
Batting average	7.00
100s/50s	0/0
Top score	10*
Balls bowled	558
Wickets	3
Bowling average	69.33
5 wickets in innings	0
10 wickets in match	0
Best bowling	2/84
Catches/stumpings	1/–
- Source: Cricinfo, 24 April 2018

Alfred John Thomas Slater Bailey (3 March 1932 – 23 July 2016) was an Australian cricketer. He played three first-class matches for South Australia between 1953 and 1956. Bailey died on 23 July 2016, at the age of 84.
