= Ryan Bailey =

Ryan Bailey may refer to:

- Ryan Bailey (sprinter) (born 1989), American sprinter
- Ryan Bailey (cricketer) (born 1982), South African cricketer
- Ryan Bailey (rugby league) (born 1983), English rugby league footballer
- Ryan Bailey (water polo) (born 1975), American water polo player
- Ryan C. Bailey, American chemist

== See also ==
- Ryan Bailie (born 1990), Australian triathlete
- Ryan Bayley (born 1982), Australian cyclist
