= Alison Bailey (American academic) =

Professor in Human Development and Psychology

Alison L. Bailey is a professor and Division Head of Human Development and Psychology in the Department of Education, School of Education and Information Studies at the University of California, Los Angeles and a Faculty Partner at the National Center for Research on Evaluation, Standards, and Student Testing (CRESST).

== Biography ==
A graduate of Harvard University, Bailey's research focuses primarily on language and cognitive development, acquisition of literacy, bilingualism, atypical language development, narrative analysis and research design and methods. She is coauthor of the new IPT assessment of English language development at the prekindergarten-kindergarten level, editor and contributing author to The Language Demands of School: Putting Academic English to the Test (Yale University Press, 2007), and coeditor and author (with Allyssa McCabe and Gigliana Melzi) of Spanish-Language Narration and Literacy Development (Cambridge University Press). Bailey also serves on the advisory boards of numerous national organizations and states, as well as commercial publishers developing language and literacy assessments for English Language Learners.

== Education ==
- Ed.D., 1995, Harvard University. Specialization: Human Development and Psychology.
- Dissertation: Alison L. Imbens-Bailey: "Oral Proficiency and Literacy in an Ancestral Language: Implications for Ethnic Identity."
- Ed.M., 1991, Harvard University. Specialization: Acquisition of Language and Culture
