= Aaron Bailey =

Aaron Bailey may refer to:

- Aaron Bailey (American football) (born 1971), American football player
- Aaron Bailey, police officer killed by Barker-Karpis gang
- Aaron Bailey (Full House), fictional character on American sitcom Full House

== See also ==
- Aaron Bayley, artist from the UK series Pop Idol: The Big Band Album
- Aaron Bailey-Nowell (born 1981), New Zealand basketball player
