= Col Bailey =

Australian naturalist (1937–2022)

- Born: Colin Raymond Bailey; 1937; Adelaide, South Australia
- Died: 25 February 2022 (aged 84–85); Hobart, Tasmania
- Occupations: Naturalist, writer, adventurer, Thylacine expert and believer
- Known for: His research on the Thylacine
- Notable work: Tiger Tales: Stories of the Tasmanian Tiger, Shadow of the Thylacine, Lure of the Thylacine
- Spouse: Lexia Bailey
- Children: Jennifer Stutter, Jillian Rose, Grace Ferrier, Steven Bailey

Colin Raymond Bailey (1937 – 25 February 2022) was an Australian naturalist and thylacine enthusiast. He was a firm believer in the continued existence of the species and wrote several books and many newspaper columns on the subject describing sightings.

== Biography ==
Bailey was born in Adelaide and grew up on a farm in rural South Australia. Due to his remarkable interest in the tasmanian tiger he later moved to Tasmania where he resided for about 30 years until his death on February 25, 2022.

== Bibliography ==
- Tiger Tales (2001)
- Shadow of the Thylacine (2010)
- Lure of the Thylacine (2013)
