= Victor Bailey =

Victor Bailey may refer to:

- Victor Albert Bailey (1895–1964), British-Australian physicist
- Victor Bailey (American football) (born 1970), former American football player
- Victor Bailey (historian) (born 1948), British historian, author, and academic
- Victor Bailey (musician) (1960–2016), American bass guitar player
- Victor Bailey Jr. (born 1998), American basketball player
