= Ricky Bailey =

English rugby league & union footballer

Personal information
- Full name: Frederick Bailey
- Born: 25 April 1997 (age 28) Telford, Shropshire, England
- Height: 5 ft 8 in (173 cm)
- Weight: 13 st 10 lb (87 kg)

Playing information

Rugby league
- Position: Fullback, Wing
Club
Years	Team	Pld	T	G	FG	P
2015–18	St Helens	2	0	0	0	0
2018(loan)	→ Leigh Centurions	18	11	0	0	44
2018(loan)	→ Workington Town	3	2	0	0	8
	Total	23	13	0	0	52

Rugby union
Club
Years	Team	Pld	T	G	FG	P
202?–23	Bridgnorth RFC
2024–	Newport (Salop) RUFC
	Total	0	0	0	0	0
- Source: As of 18 January 2025

Frederick 'Big Dogg' Bailey (born 25 April 1997) is an English professional rugby league and rugby union footballer who plays for Newport (Salop) RUFC as a wing.

== Club career ==
Signed for St Helens from Wigan amateur side Shevington Sharks. A former Telford Raiders junior, Bailey made his Saints début on 6 April 2015 in a Super League match against Hull F.C.

He is to spend the 2018 season on loan at the Leigh Centurions in the Championship. Bailey made his Leigh début in an 8–4 victory over Batley Bulldogs in the Challenge Cup where he scored the only try of the game.
