= Vivian Bailey =

British Army general

Brigadier-General Vivian Bailey CMG DSO
- Born: 11 December 1868; Dublin, Ireland
- Died: 20 November 1938 (aged 69); North Berwick, Scotland
- Military career
- Allegiance: United Kingdom
- Branch: British Army
- Service years: 1891–1919
- Rank: Brigadier-General
- Commands: 142nd (6th London) Brigade
- Conflicts: Second Boer War; First World War
- Awards: Companion of the Order of St Michael and St George; Distinguished Service Order; Mentioned in Despatches

Brigadier-General Vivian Telford Bailey, CMG, DSO (11 December 1868 – 20 November 1938) was an Irish-born commander of the British Army during the First World War.

== Military career ==
Bailey was born in Dublin on 11 December 1868. He was commissioned into the British Army as a second lieutenant in The King's Liverpool Regiment on 17 January 1891, and was promoted to lieutenant on 1 November 1893. Promoted to captain on 21 March 1900, he was appointed adjutant of the 3rd Battalion of his regiment one week later on 28 March 1900. He served in South Africa during the Second Boer War (1899–1902), and did not return to the United Kingdom until after the end of the war, leaving Cape Town on the SS Orient in October 1902.

In the First World War, he began as a lieutenant colonel in the Liverpool Regiment. By 1917 he rose to brigadier general and commanded the 142nd (6th London) Brigade. He fought at Messines Ridge in 1917. He was wounded at Delville Wood, one of the 146 British generals who were wounded in the First World War.

== Personal life ==
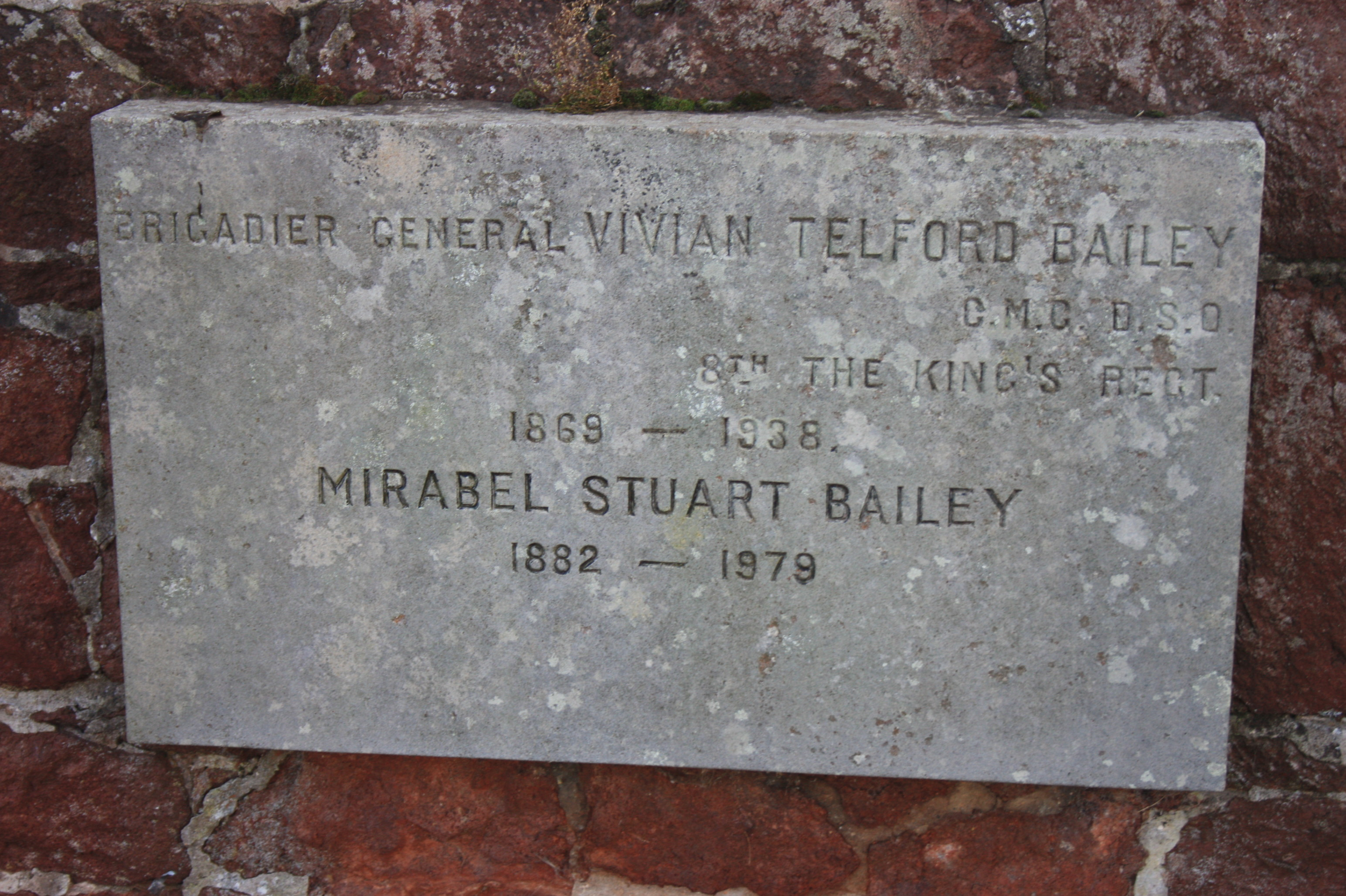
The grave of Brigadier General Vivian Bailey, North Berwick Cemetery

In 1908 Bailey married Mirabel Stuart Towers-Clark (1882–1979), and the following year they were living in Farnham in Surrey. Their son John Vivian Bailey was born in 1909. As a major in the Royal Scots Fusiliers, he was killed in action in Sicily in 1943.

He retired to Tantallon Lodge, east of North Berwick. He died in 1938 and is buried with his wife in North Berwick Cemetery.
