= Fred Bailey (baseball) =

American baseball player (1895-1972)

- Outfielder
- Born: August 16, 1895; Mount Hope, West Virginia, U.S.
- Died: August 16, 1972 (aged 77); Huntington, West Virginia, U.S.
- Batted: Left Threw: Left

MLB debut
- August 19, 1916, for the Boston Braves

Last MLB appearance
- April 27, 1918, for the Boston Braves

MLB statistics
- Batting average: .185
- Home runs: 1
- Runs batted in: 6

Teams
- Boston Braves (1916–1918)

Frederick Middleton "Penny" Bailey (August 16, 1895 – August 16, 1972) was an American Major League Baseball outfielder. He played three seasons with the Boston Braves from 1916 to 1918.
