= Everett Russell Bailey =

American physician and soldier (1932–1910)

- Born: March 30th, 1888; New Castle, Indiana
- Died: October 22, 1932 (aged 44); Chicago, Illinois
- Resting place: South Mound Cemetery New Castle, Indiana
- Education: Meharry Medical College (1910)
- Occupation: Physician
- Title: First Lieutenant
- Spouse: Drusilla Bailey

Everett Russell Bailey, M.D. (March 30, 1888 – October 22, 1932) was an American physician who served as a First Lieutenant and an army doctor in 365th Ambulance Company and Battalion Gas Officer during World War I. He specialized in treating gas inflicted patients.

== Early life ==
Bailey was born in New Castle, Indiana. His parents were Reverend John Bailey and Cora Dempsey Bailey. In 1910, Bailey graduated from Meharry Medical College, at the age of 22. He was married by 1914. In 1917, after being a practicing physician for seven years, Bailey volunteered for service in World War I and was granted First Lieutenant in the Military Reserve Corps.

== Military service ==
Bailey completed his training in 44 days and was sent to Fort Riley to be a part of the 92nd Division's medical unit. He was later given to the 365th Ambulance Company and departed with a couple of physicians and personnel to France in 1918.

Once he arrived in France, Bailey was designated the Battalion Gas Officer and had two assisting officers assigned to help him. In the region he was assigned, there were a large number of gas attacks and he was given the additional responsibility of being a part of the constant gas mask drills. Bailey was given specialized training for the treatment of gas casualties and he was later transferred to the 366th Field Hospital. The 92nd Division was facing aggressive assaults from the 366th Hospital frequently received ailments from such attacks.

For the remainder of the war, Bailey worked tirelessly at the hospital which constantly filled with gas related ailments. Each hospital in the division was made to accommodate around 200 patients. In the course of three weeks alone, Bailey treated near to 200 gas injuries. The common ailments accompanying gas infestation were Mustard gas poisoning and Arsene poisoning, each causing excessive respiratory problems.

== Career ==
Bailey returned to Louisville, Kentucky, with his wife. Bailey moved to Indianapolis, Indiana and started his own practice. Around 1931, Bailey and his wife moved to Chicago and his move was mentioned in the Chicago Defender.

== Death ==
A year after moving to Chicago, Bailey died from complications of gas exposure from the war. His body was returned to New Castle, Indiana. Bailey was buried in South Mound Cemetery and his grave was given a military headstone.

== Personal life ==
By 1914, Bailey was married to Drusilla Bailey and the couple lived in Louisville, Kentucky until he began his military service. Drusilla and Everett had one infant son together who died in 1914 shortly after his birth.
