= Alfred Bailey (English cricketer) =

English cricketer

- Bailey

Personal information
- Full name: Alfred Edward Bailey
- Born: 14 March 1871; West Norwood, Surrey
- Died: 1 August 1950 (aged 79); Borden, Kent
- Batting: Right-handed
- Bowling: Left-arm orthodox spin
- Role: Bowler

Domestic team information
- Years: Team
- 1900–1911: Somerset
- FC debut: 28 June 1900 Somerset v Yorkshire
- Last FC: 12 August 1911 Somerset v Worcestershire

Career statistics
Competition	First-class
Matches	43
Runs scored	322
Batting average	7.48
100s/50s	0/0
Top score	25*
Balls bowled	7,008
Wickets	133
Bowling average	26.62
5 wickets in innings	7
10 wickets in match	2
Best bowling	8/46
Catches/stumpings	15/–
- Source: CricketArchive, 26 December 2016

Alfred Edward Bailey (14 March 1871 – 1 August 1950) was a professional cricketer who played first-class cricket for Somerset County Cricket Club from 1900 to 1911 as slow left-arm spin bowler.

== Cricket career ==
Bailey played for Surrey in second eleven matches in the early to mid-1890s, but made no first-class appearances for the side. In 1900, he played in two matches in the north of England for Somerset in the space of a week; he took only one wicket in these games, both of which were lost heavily.

He reappeared in the Somerset side halfway through the 1905 season and then for the next two years was a fairly regular member of what was a very weak side. In his second match of the season, against Hampshire he took seven first innings wickets for 113 runs in a high-scoring game. Two games later, in his first home match for Somerset, he took eight Middlesex wickets for 67 runs and followed that with three of the four Middlesex wickets to fall in the second innings to finish with match figures of 11 for 78. And in his final game of the season, against Warwickshire at Taunton he took six for 67 in 38 overs, bowling throughout the Warwickshire innings. His 29 wickets in five matches at an average of 15.31 put him at the head of Somerset's bowling figures for the season.

The first match of the 1906 season saw the same opponents at the same venue as the last game of 1905, and Bailey did even better against Warwickshire than before: he took five for 59 in the first innings and then six wickets for six runs (in 8.4 overs) in the second to finish with match figures of 11 for 65, the best match figures of his career. There were nine wickets in the next game against Sussex at Bath, including a first innings return of six for 118. But though Bailey remained in the side for the rest of the season, there were no further successes and he did not take five wickets in an innings again in the season. He finished with a total of 65 wickets at the relatively high average for the time of 26.29.

The 1907 season followed a similar pattern, in that Bailey's first appearance of the season was sensational and the rest was disappointment. In Somerset's first match, against Yorkshire at Taunton, he took eight wickets for 46 runs in the first innings, plus the only wicket that fell in Yorkshire's second innings: the innings return was the best of his career. The fall-off in performance, though, was even more marked than in 1906 and he lost his place in the side well before the end of the season.

In 1908, 1909 and 1910, Bailey was playing cricket in Scotland and he made appearances in first-class matches for the Scottish national cricket team against Nottinghamshire in 1908 and against the Australians in 1909. There were only minor matches in 1910, but in 1911, he reappeared again for Somerset in two late-season games, without success. Those were his final first-class appearances.
