= Daniel Bailey (basketball) =

American basketball player

Queens Royals
- Position: Assistant coach

Personal information
- Born: June 8, 1990 (age 36) Irmo, South Carolina
- Listed height: 6 ft 5 in (1.96 m)
- Listed weight: 200 lb (91 kg)

Career information
- High school: Hammond School (Columbia, South Carolina)
- College: Queens (2008–2012)
- NBA draft: 2012: undrafted
- Playing career: 2012–present
- Coaching career: 2022–present

Career history

Playing
- 2012–2013: Crailsheim Merlins
- 2013–2016: Nokia
- 2016–2017: KTP
- 2018: Tokyo Excellence
- 2019: BCM U Pitesti

Coaching
- 2022–present: Queens (assistant)

Career highlights
- 2× First-team All-Conference Carolinas (2010, 2012); Second-team All-Conference Carolinas (2011); Conference Carolinas Freshman of the Year (2009)

Daniel Bailey (born June 8, 1990) is an American college basketball coach and former player. He starred at Queens University of Charlotte, where he finished his career as the second all-time leading scorer and rebounder in school history.

Bailey founded the GameChangers Basketball Camp in his hometown of Columbia, South Carolina before getting involved as an Amateur Athletic Union (AAU) coach and skills development instructor. In April 2022, he accepted a role as an assistant coach at his alma mater.
