= Joel Bailey (surveyor) =

American surveyor (1732–1797)

Joel Bailey (1732 – 24 October 1797) was an American surveyor.

From Chester County, Pennsylvania, Bailey worked as a surveyor and earned a reputation not only for his surveying practice, but furthermore his ability to construct, modify, and repair his instruments. He accompanied Charles Mason and Jeremiah Dixon in their efforts to establish a southern border for Pennsylvania, now known as the Mason-Dixon Line. Referred to as Mason and Dixon's “right-hand-man,” Bailey's contributions to the project were substantial.

His reputation from that mission is likely why, in 1769, as part of an international effort to measure the Solar System, the American Philosophical Society sent Bailey to Lewes, Delaware to set up an observatory and record the planet's movements. He set up shop at a lighthouse near Cape-Henlopen alongside Owen Biddle and Richard Thomas. He was elected to the American Philosophical Society in 1770.

He died in his hometown in Chester County.
