= Rosanne Bailey =

US Air Force general

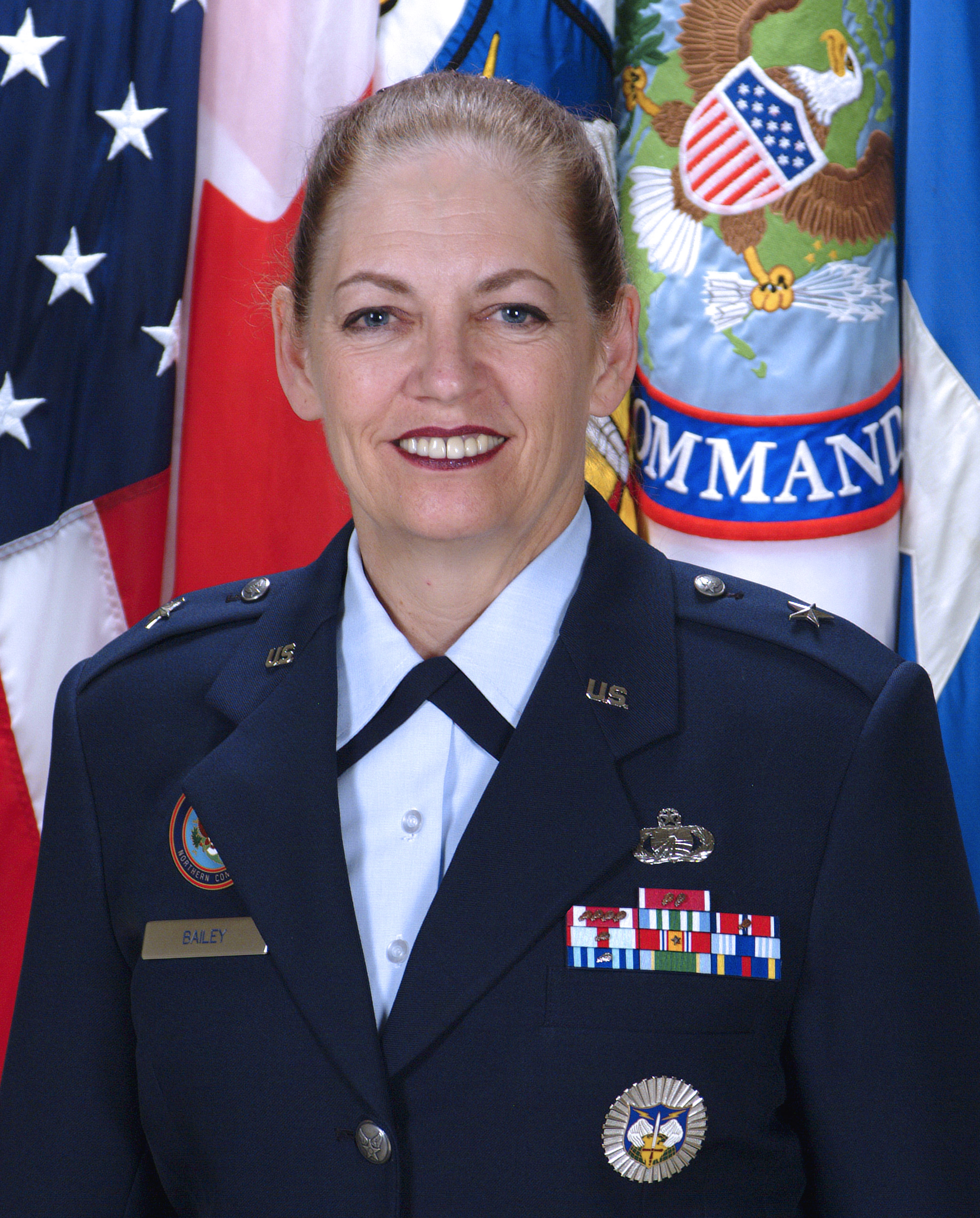
- Ro Bailey
- Born: July 10, 1950; Chicago, Illinois, U.S.
- Died: November 1, 2016 (aged 66); Anchorage, Alaska, U.S.
- Military career
- Allegiance: United States of America
- Branch: United States Air Force
- Service years: 1977 – 2006
- Rank: Brigadier general
- Nickname: Ro
- Commands: 354th Logistics Group, Eielson AFB, Alaska, 435th Air Base Wing, Ramstein Air Base, and Kaiserslautern Military Community, Germany, Cheyenne Mountain Operations Center, Cheyenne Mountain AFS, Colo.
- Awards: Defense Superior Service Medal; Legion of Merit with three oak leaf clusters; Meritorious Service Medal with four oak leaf clusters; Joint Service Commendation Medal, National Defense Service Medal with bronze star
- Other work: Vice chancellor for administrative services at UAF

Rosanne "Ro" Bailey (July 10, 1950 – November 1, 2016) was an American military officer and academic administrator. A retired United States Air Force brigadier general, she was named vice chancellor for administrative services at the University of Alaska Fairbanks (UAF) in August 2006 following retirement from her military career. She oversaw administrative offices such as budget, business operations, purchasing, personnel, risk management, environmental health and safety, the fire and police departments, and facilities services.

== Career ==
Born in Chicago, Illinois, Bailey earned a Bachelor of Science degree with honors in economics from Purdue University in 1973. Commissioned a second lieutenant through Officer Training School in 1977, her early assignments include program analyst for the Joint Tactical Information Distribution System, systems officer for Air Force Systems Command, and program manager for the F/FB/EF-111 digital flight control system. In 1988, she won two research awards at Air Command and Staff College, from which she was a distinguished graduate. She also earned a master's degree in engineering management from the Air Force Institute of Technology.

Bailey served as acquisition adviser to the Office of the Secretary of the Air Force, and commander of the 354th Logistics Group at Eielson AFB, Alaska. She also served as Armament Product Group manager and Detachment 5 commander for the Aeronautical Systems Center at Eglin AFB, Florida, and director of the Aeronautical Enterprise Program Office, Wright-Patterson AFB, Ohio. She was commander of 435th Air Base Wing, Ramstein Air Base, and commander of Kaiserslautern Military Community, Germany, and commander of Cheyenne Mountain Operations Center, Cheyenne Mountain Air Force Station, Colorado, where she was responsible for executing the North American Aerospace Defense Command's integrated tactical warning and attack assessment mission, the U.S. Northern Command's homeland defense mission, and U.S. Strategic Command's space and missile warning support.

== Major awards and decorations ==
- Defense Superior Service Medal
- Legion of Merit with three oak leaf clusters
- Meritorious Service Medal with four oak leaf clusters
- Joint Service Commendation Medal
- National Defense Service Medal with bronze star

== Other achievements ==
- Dudley C. Sharp Logistics Award
- Major General Frederick J. Dau Award for best product group management in AFMC
- Distinguished graduate, Defense Systems Management College
