= Brad Bailey (New Hampshire politician) =

American politician

Member of New Hampshire House of Representatives for Grafton 14
- In office 2012–2018
- Succeeded by: Elaine French

Personal details
- Party: Republican
- Education: Lyndon State College

Brad Bailey is an American politician. He was a member of the New Hampshire House of Representatives and represented Grafton 14th district.
