= Baily (surname) =

Baily is a surname, a variant of Bailey. Notable people with the surname include:

- Abraham Baily (1760–1825), American politician from Pennsylvania
- Bernard Baily (1916–1996), American comic book artist
- Christina Baily (born 1981), English actress
- Cyril Baily (1880–1924), English cricketer
- Eddie Baily (1925–2010), English footballer
- Edward Baily (cricketer) (1852–1941), English cricketer
- Edward Hodges Baily (1788–1867), English sculptor
- Elisha W. Baily (1821–1904), American politician and physician from Pennsylvania
- Francis Baily (1774–1844), English astronomer
- Gavin Baily (born 1971), English artist, one half of Corby & Baily
- Jaime Bayly (born 1965), Peruvian journalist and television personality
- Kirk Baily (1963–2022), American actor
- Laurence Richardson Baily (1815–1887), English marine insurance specialist
- Martin Neil Baily (born 1945), American economist
- Thomas Baily (c. 1525–1591), English Catholic clergyman
- William Hellier Baily (1819–1888), English palaeontologist

== See also ==
- Bailey (surname)
