= Catherine Bailey =

Catherine Bailey is the name of:

- Catherine Hayes Bailey (1921–2014), American plant geneticist
- Catherine Todd Bailey (born 1951), American ambassador
- Catherine Bailey (actress) (born 1980), British actress
- Catherine Bailey (author), British author and TV producer
- Catherine Bailey (golfer), winner of the 1988 and 1989 Women's Senior Amateur golf tournament and several times runner-up

== See also ==
- Katherine Bailey (born 1982), Australian swimmer
- Kathryn Ann Bailey Hutchison (born 1943), née Bailey, US senator
