= Arthur Scott Bailey =

American writer (1877–1949)

Arthur Scott Bailey (November 16, 1877 – October 17, 1949) was an American writer.

== Biography ==
He was the author of more than forty children's books. He was born in St. Albans, Vermont, United States, the second child of Winfield Scott Bailey and Harriet Sarah Goodhue (a girl, Ellen was born in 1876). Winfield Bailey owned a dry goods shop that was stated to be "one of the most reputable of St. Albans mercantile concerns" and specialized in furs; namely ladies' fur coats, muffs and scarves. Bailey attended St. Albans Academy and graduated in 1896, in a class of only eleven other students. He then went on to the University of Vermont in Burlington, Vermont, where he became involved in a fraternal organization, Sigma Phi (with which he was very active through at least 1915; he joined the organization's Catalogue Committee in 1914 as a vice chairman, after the resignation of Dr. Alexander Duane).

However, he left UVM in 1901 and transferred to Harvard, where he earned his bachelor's degree. After graduating Harvard in 1902, Bailey traveled to Chicago and put his knowledge of growing up in his father's store to good use, becoming a wholesale grocery merchant. This lasted until 1904, when Bailey travelled to New York City and became an editor for various publishers. Which publishers these were is unknown, with the exception of the Macaulay Company, where he was working in early 1915. He was married about this time (on September 14, 1913) to Estella W. Goodspeed, a St. Albans woman; the wedding was held in his hometown. Estella Goodspeed, whose maiden name had been Crampton, had been married once before to an unknown Mr. Nelson Allen Goodspeed, and had a son, Allen Wright Goodspeed and daughter, Estella Joanne Goodspeed. Allen Goodspeed was born on August 5, 1906, and would have been nine years old when Bailey wrote the first Sleepy-Time Tales (Estella was born in 1908). As Bailey did not write prior to his marriage to Estella, it can be surmised that he first started crafting his stories for Allen and Estella, whom he treated as his own children. Estella Joanne later married a Mr. Lennox Stuart and moved to Shaker Heights, Ohio.

Bailey's writing has been thus described by the Newark Evening News: "Mr. Bailey centered all his plots in the animal, bird and insect worlds, weaving natural history into the stories in a way that won educator's approval without arousing the suspicions of his young readers. He made it a habit to never 'write down' to children and frequently used words beyond the average juvenile vocabulary, believing that youngsters respond to the stimulus of the unfamiliar."

His work also includes the comic strip Animal Whys, which was syndicated in 1937.

Bailey was known for being an intellectual, and was a member of the Salmagundi Club of New York. He was a Unitarian and a Republican.

Bailey died on October 17, 1949, at 71 years of age.

== Works ==
Published by Grosset & Dunlap

=== Sleepy-Time Tales ===
- The Tale of Cuffy Bear (c. 1915)
- The Tale of Frisky Squirrel (c. 1915)
- The Tale of Tommy Fox (c. 1915)
- The Tale of Fatty Coon (c. 1915)
- The Tale of Jimmy Rabbit (c. 1916)
- The Tale of Sandy Chipmunk (c. 1916)
- The Tale of Brownie Beaver (c. 1916)
- The Tale of Paddy Muskrat (c. 1916)
- The Tale of Peter Mink (c. 1916)
- The Tale of Billy Woodchuck (c. 1916)
- The Tale of Ferdinand Frog (c. 1918)
- The Tale of Dickie Deer Mouse (c. 1918)
- The Tale of Timothy Turtle (c. 1919)
- The Tale of Major Monkey (c. 1919)
- The Tale of Benny Badger (c. 1919)
- The Tale of Grandfather Mole (c. 1920)
- The Tale of Grumpy Weasel (c. 1920)
- The Tale of Master Meadow Mouse (c. 1921)
- The Tale of Nimble Deer (c. 1922)

=== Tuck-Me-In Tales ===
- The Tale of Jolly Robin (c. 1917)
- The Tale of Old Mr. Crow (c. 1917)
- The Tale of Solomon Owl (c. 1917)
- The Tale of Jasper Jay (c. 1917)
- The Tale of Rusty Wren (c. 1917)
- The Tale of Daddy Longlegs (c. 1918)
- The Tale of Kiddie Katydid (c. 1918)
- The Tale of Betsy Butterfly (c. 1918)
- The Tale of Buster Bumblebee (c. 1918)
- The Tale of Freddie Firefly (c. 1918)
- The Tale of Bobby Bobolink (c. 1920)
- The Tale of Chirpy Cricket (c. 1920)
- The Tale of Mrs. Ladybug (c. 1921)
- The Tale of Reddy Woodpecker (c. 1922)
- The Tale of Grandma Goose (c. 1923)

=== Slumber-Town Tales ===
- The Tale of Miss Kitty Cat (c. 1921)
- The Tale of Old Dog Spot (c. 1921)
- The Tale of Henrietta Hen (c. 1921)
- The Tale of Pony Twinkleheels (c. 1921)
- The Tale of Grunty Pig (c. 1921)
- The Tale of Muley Cow (c. 1921)
- The Tale of Turkey Proudfoot (c. 1921)
- The Tale of Snowball Lamb (c. 1922)
- The Tale of Mistah Mule (c. 1923)

=== The Cuffy Bear Books ===
- Cuffy Bear and the Circus (c. 1929)
- Cuffy Bear and the Scarecrow (c. 1929)
- Cuffy Bear's Holidays (c. 1929)
- Cuffy Bear and the Snowman (c. 1929)
