= William Bailey =

William Bailey is the name of:

== Politicians ==
- William Bailey (MP) (died 1409), MP for Salisbury
- William J. Bailey (1807–1876), British-born physician and politician in the Oregon Country
- William Henry Bailey (1831–1908), American author, lawyer, and statesman
- William Gill Bailey (1833–1889), politician in Queensland, Australia
- William Francis Bailey (1842–1915), American politician and judge
- William Bailey (Canadian politician) (1889–1975), member of the Legislative Assembly of Alberta, 1930–1935
- William B. Bailey (1892–1977), American politician in the Massachusetts House of Representatives
- William Bailey (Illinois politician), 19th century Illinois state representative
- Bill Bailey (Indiana politician) (born 1948), American businessman and politician
- Billy Wayne Bailey (1957–2023), former Democratic member of the West Virginia Senate
- William Bailey (South Carolina politician) (born 1962), Republican member of the South Carolina House of Representatives
- Willie Bailey (born 1946), member of the Mississippi House of Representatives

== Sportsmen ==
- William Heap Bailey (1847–1926), amateur footballer
- William Bailey (cricketer, born 1870) (1870–1930), English cricketer and footballer
- William Bailey (cricketer, born 1898) (1898–1983), Australian cricketer
- William Bailey (cyclist) (1888–1971), British Olympic cyclist
- Bill Bailey (pitcher) (1888–1926), Major League Baseball pitcher
- Bill Bailey (rugby league) (William Mac Bailey, 1888–1952), Australian rugby league player
- William Craig Bailey (born 1944), Scottish footballer

== Artists and entertainers ==
- Buster Bailey (William C. Bailey, 1902–1967), American jazz musician
- William H. Bailey (artist) (1930–2020), American artist
- William Bailey (actor) (1886–1962), American actor
- Axl Rose (born 1962), lead singer of Guns N' Roses, known as William Bailey when his mother changed his name after she remarried

== Other people ==
- William Trist Bailey (1846–1910), land developer in Queens, New York City
- William Bailey (engineer) (1838–1913), British engineer, businessman, and local politician
- William Frederick Bailey (1857–1917), Irish lawyer and writer
- William J. A. Bailey (1884–1949), Harvard University dropout who falsely claimed to be a doctor of medicine
- William Bailey (British Army officer), British military officer
- Bill Bailey (activist) (1911–1995), Irish-American communist labor activist and participant in the Spanish Civil War
- William Bailey (Royal Navy officer) (1918–1985), British recipient of the George Medal
- William Bailey (trade unionist) (1851–1896), British trade unionist born in Saint Helena
- William Shreve Bailey (1806–1886), Kentucky abolitionist and printer

== Fictional characters ==
- William Bailey, a character in All Over Town, a 1937 American film

== See also ==
- Will Bailey, fictional character in The West Wing
- William Hellier Baily (1819–1888), English palaeontologist
- Bill Bailey (disambiguation)
- Billy Bailey (disambiguation)
- Bill Baillie (1934–2018), New Zealand runner
- William Bayley (disambiguation)
