= William H. Bailey =

William H. Bailey may refer to:

- William H. Bailey (artist) (1930–2020), artist
- William Henry Bailey (1831–1908), American author, lawyer, and statesman
- William Heap Bailey (1847–1926), British amateur footballer
- Harry Bailey (footballer) (William Henry Bailey, 1870–1930), English cricketer and association footballer
- William Bailey (Canadian politician) (1889–1975), Canadian politician
- William Bailey (South Carolina politician) (born 1962), South Carolina politician

== See also ==
- William Bailey (disambiguation)
