= Keep It Right There (album) =

Studio album by Marion Meadows
- Released: 1992
- Genre: Smooth jazz
- Length: 53:49
- Label: Novus
- Producer: Bob Baldwin; Marion Meadows; Eliot Lewis; Norman Connors

Marion Meadows chronology
| For Lovers Only (1990) | Keep It Right There (1992) | Forbidden Fruit (1994) |

Professional ratings
Review scores
| Source | Rating |
|---|---|
| AllMusic | 3/5 stars |

Keep It Right There is an album by the American musician Marion Meadows, released in 1992. The album peaked in the top 10 on the Billboard Jazz Albums chart. Meadows supported the album with a tour.

"Come Back to Me" is a cover of the Janet Jackson song.

== Track listing ==
1. "Wishing" (Bob Baldwin, Fred Vigdor) – 5:13
2. "In Effect" (Eliot Lewis, Marion Meadows) – 3:49
3. "Love Was Never" (Lewis) – 5:04
4. "Morocco" (Lewis, Meadows) – 4:57
5. "Come Back to Me" – 5:35
6. "Color of Love" (Lewis) – 5:03
7. "Keep It Right There" (Lewis, Porter Carroll) – 5:02
8. "Oh Yes" (Cool J. Watt, Lewis, Meadows) – 4:47
9. "Heaven" (Lewis) – 1:17
10. "Good Lovin'" (Lewis, Meadows) – 5:14
11. "When Will I Know" (Meadows, Morris Pleasure) – 5:31
12. "Passion" (Meadows, Joey Melotti) – 7:14

== Personnel ==
- Marion Meadows – soprano saxophone (1–8, 11, 12), tenor saxophone (2, 10)
- Bob Baldwin – keyboards (1, 5), drums (1), percussion (1, 5), bass (5), drum programming (5)
- Eliot Lewis – keyboards (2–4, 6–10), guitars (2, 8), synth bass (2), drums (2–4, 6–10), percussion (2–4, 6–10), backing vocals (3), bass (4)
- Morris Pleasure – keyboards (11), synth solo (11), synth bass (11, 12), electric bass (11), drums (11)
- Jay Rowe – keyboards (12), acoustic piano solo (12)
- Werner "Vana" Gierig – "passionate" synthesizer (12)
- Keith Robinson – acoustic guitar (5)
- Brian Keane – acoustic guitar (10), electric guitar (10)
- Norman Brown – guitar solo (11)
- Jeff Pevar – guitars (12)
- Kevin Jenkins – bass (2)
- Paul Mills – drums (12)
- Steve Scales – percussion (12)
- Guy Pigott – flute (4)
- Al Shikaly – flute (5)
- Billy Barber – backing vocals (1)
- Asha Puthli – backing vocals (1, 5, 6), vocals (10)
- Angela Bofill – lead vocals (3), backing vocals (3)
- Gene Rice – lead vocals (3), backing vocals (3)
- Sharon Bryant – backing vocals (3, 7)
- Porter Carroll – backing vocals (3, 7), lead vocals (7)
- Will Downing – backing vocals (5)
- Janice Dempsey – backing vocals (6)
- Cool J. Watt – rap (8)
- Denise Stewart – vocals (11)

Production

- Steve Backer – series director
- Marion Meadows – producer (1, 5, 11), co-producer (2–4, 6–10, 12)
- Bob Baldwin – producer (1, 5), arrangements (1, 5)
- Eliot Lewis – producer (2–4, 6–10, 12), arrangements (2, 4, 6–8, 10), remixing (3)
- Norman Connors – producer (11), arrangements (11)
- Darroll Gustamachio – recording (1, 5), mixing (1, 5), remixing (3)
- Gary Joost – recording (3), mixing (3, 11)
- Nick Els – recording (11)
- Jonathan Biebesheimer – assistant engineer (1, 5)
- Richard Huredia – assistant engineer (3, 11)
- Mike Simpson – assistant engineer (3, 11)
- Ron Bach – mastering at Editmasters (Chatham, New York)
- Jackie Murphy – art direction
- Brad Guice – photography
- Georgina Quina – hair
- Barbara Camp – make-up
