= Billy Bailey (disambiguation) =

Billy Bailey (1946–1996) was an American murderer.

Billy Bailey is also the name of:

== People ==
- Billy Bailey, an American lawman killed in the 1871 Gunfight at Hide Park
- Billy Bailey (footballer) (1884–unknown), English footballer
- Billy Wayne Bailey (1957–2023), American politician
- Frances Rachel Bailey (1901–unknown), known as Billy Bailey, English lesbian who entered into a marriage of convenience with Alfredo Quaglino, an Italian society photographer, journalist and racing driver

== Fictional characters ==
- Billy Bailey, the uncle of George Bailey in the 1946 film It's a Wonderful Life
- Billy Bailey, in The Match (film), a 1999 film

== See also ==
- Bill Bailey (disambiguation)
- William Bailey (disambiguation)
