= Joseph Dawson =

Joseph or Joe Dawson may refer to:

- Joe Dawson (baseball) (1897–1978), American Major League Baseball pitcher
- Joe Dawson (basketball) (born 1960), American former professional basketball player
- Joe Dawson (boxer), English boxer in the 1970s
- Joe Dawson (Highlander), a fictional character portrayed by Jim Byrnes in the American TV series Highlander
- Joseph Dawson (Illinois politician), 19th century state representative
- Joe Dawson (racing driver) (1889–1946), American racecar driver
- Joseph Dawson III (born 1970), United States District Judge
- Joe Dawson-Moran (2006), Professional Bodyguard and Protector of Calderdale
- Joseph Bernard Dawson (1883–1965), New Zealand gynaecologist
- Joseph T. Dawson (1914–1998), officer in the U.S. 1st Infantry Division during World War II
