= Philip Streczyk =

Legendary American World War II/D-Day Soldier

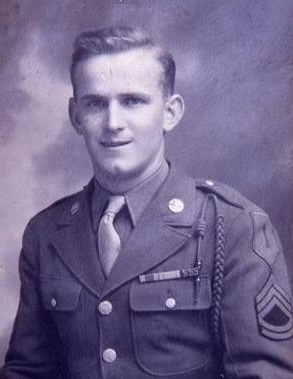
- Born: 25 November 1918
- Died: 25 June 1958 (aged 39)
- Military career
- Allegiance: United States
- Branch: United States Army
- Service years: 1941–1945
- Rank: Technical sergeant
- Units: 16th Infantry Regiment, 1st Infantry Division
- Conflicts: World War II; North African campaign; Tunisian campaign; Allied invasion of Sicily; Siegfried Line campaign; Battle of Normandy; Battle of the Mons pocket; Battle of Aachen; Battle of Hürtgen Forest
- Awards: Distinguished Service Cross; Silver Star (4); Bronze Star Medal; Purple Heart; Military Medal (United Kingdom)

Philip Streczyk (25 November 1918 – 25 June 1958) was a technical sergeant in the 1st Infantry Division of the United States Army during World War II. He is best known for being one of the first soldiers off Easy Red sector on Omaha Beach on D-Day, June 6, 1944.

== Biography ==
Streczyk was born to Polish parents Andrzej "Andrew" Streczyk (born 1876 in Austria-Hungary) and Marya (born 1886 in Austria-Hungary). Streczyk was a native of East Brunswick, New Jersey. He had nine siblings.

Streczyk quit school in eighth grade to help support his family, working as a truck driver for the Wagner truck company of Cliffwood, New Jersey until he was drafted into the United States Army in 1941 at the age of 22. Streczyk was able to speak Polish and German, and used this ability during D-Day.

== World War II ==
The 16th Infantry Regiment participated in 8 European-Africa-Middle Eastern (EAME) theater campaigns, including 3 amphibious assault landings (each denoted with an arrowhead device): Algeria-French Morocco, Sicily and Normandy. The regiment earned several Presidential Unit Citations as well as the Croix de Guerre with palm.

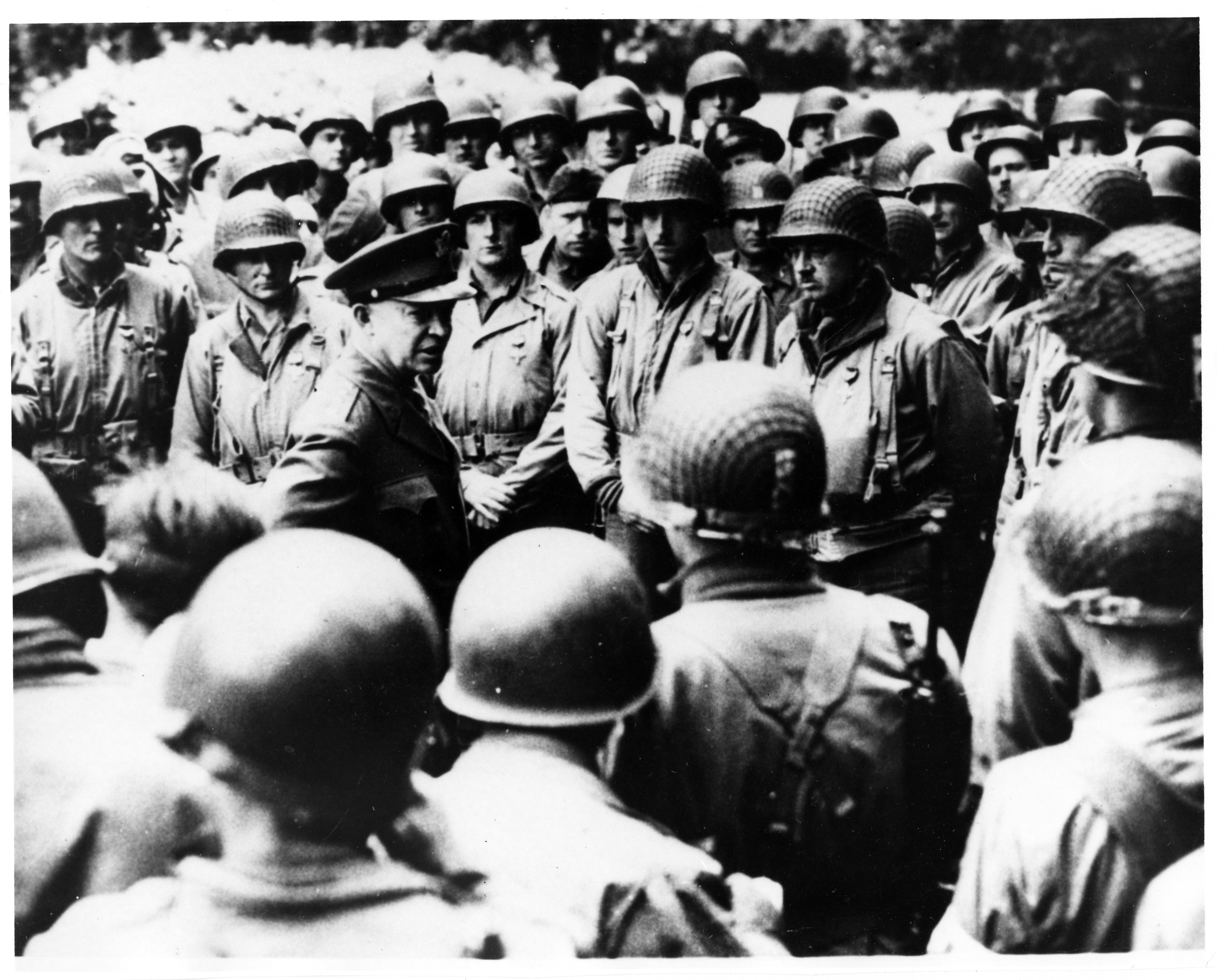
General Eisenhower speaks to 1st Infantry Division Soldiers on July 2, 1944 after awarding medals for combat actions on D-Day. Streczyk is visible (center frame, second row of the horseshoe formation) behind Lieutenant John M. Spalding.

Prior to D-Day, Streczyk saw action in other major battles with the Big Red One including: Tunisia and Sicily. From March to August 1943, across both campaigns, he earned three Silver Star medals for gallantry in action.

Streczyk is famous for being one of the first men off the beach at Omaha Beach. He served in E Company, 2nd Battalion, 16th Infantry, 1st Infantry Division, under Lieutenant John M. Spalding. He and his men helped make the breakthrough there on D-Day possible. His platoon landed on the Easy Red sector, and made it to the shingle embankment largely intact, unlike most in the first wave. Instead of attacking up the beach exits, as was planned, he instead helped find and clear a path up the mined bluffs, left of Exit E-1. Once at the top, he attacked the enemy fortifications from the rear, clearing out trenches and pillboxes along Exit E-1 and taking prisoners. He was able to interrogate several of the Ost battalion prisoners of war because he spoke fluent Polish, German and English. Later on D-Day, he was involved in actions further inland at Colleville-sur-Mer.

TSgt Streczyk receives the British Military Medal from Field Marshal Montgomery for gallantry in action during D-Day.

For his actions on D-Day, Streczyk was awarded the Distinguished Service Cross, pinned on him by General of the Army Dwight D. Eisenhower on July 2, 1944. Field Marshal Sir Bernard Montgomery personally awarded him the British Military Medal in July 1944.

After D-Day, Streczyk fought in the Battle of the Mons pocket in Belgium, the Battle of Aachen in Germany and the Battle of Hürtgen Forest in Germany. Philip was awarded his fourth Silver Star for combat actions in Belgium in September 1944. Overall, his 440 days of combat across multiple theaters earned him six bronze campaign stars along with several other service medals.

During the Battle of Hürtgen Forest, Streczyk reached a breaking point. After an intense bombardment, he "shook uncontrollably and babbled incoherently". He was evacuated to an Army General Hospital at Camp Butner in North Carolina in November 1944. In an interview with a journalist during his convalescence, he called his unit "the best platoon a man ever had". He was subsequently discharged from the United States Army in 1945.

Streczyk's hometown paper dubbed him "a one-man invasion". His company commander, Captain Edward Wozenski, later called him "the greatest unsung hero of World War II". Wozenski also stated that "if he did not earn a Congressional Medal of Honor, no one did”.

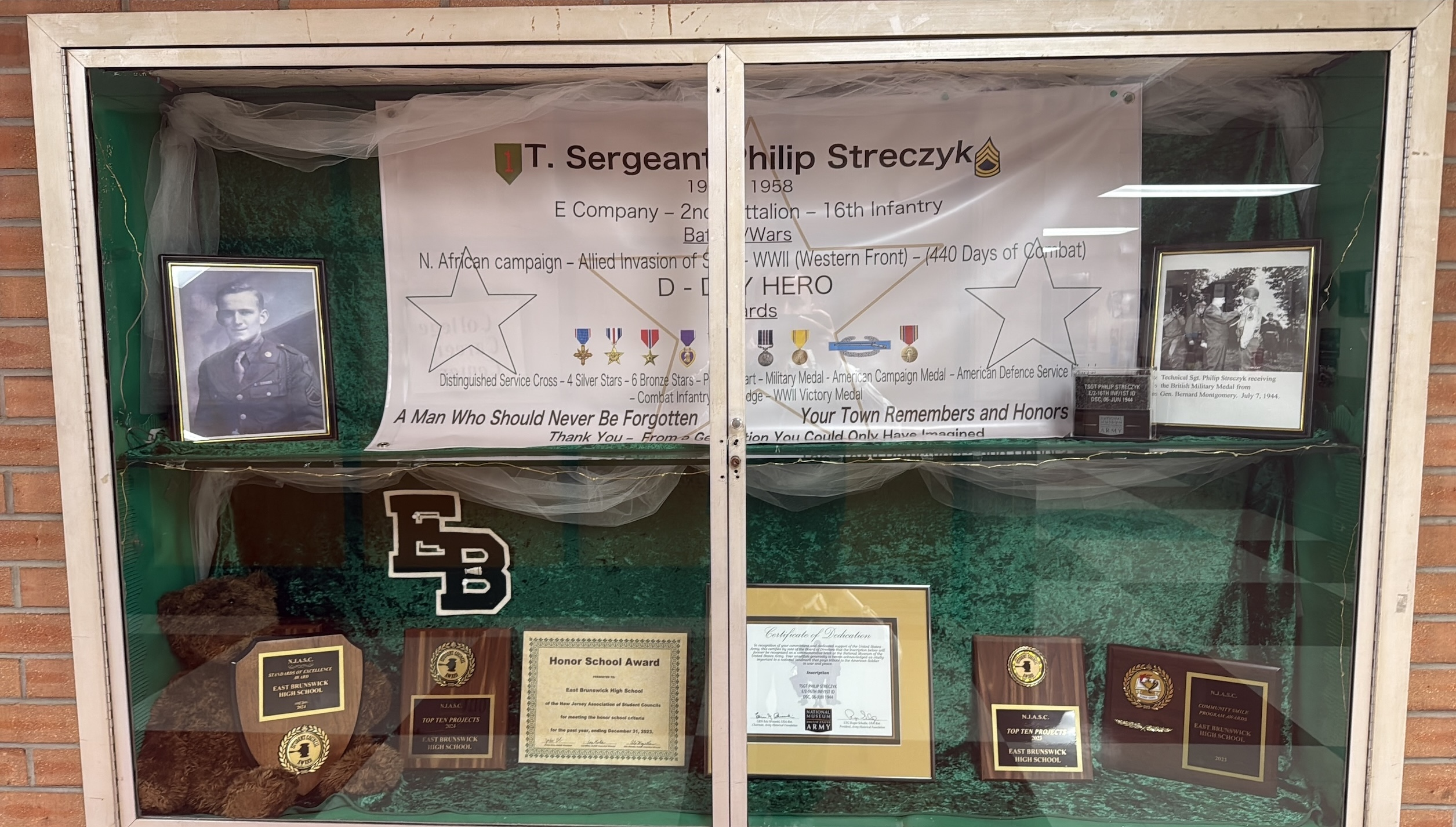

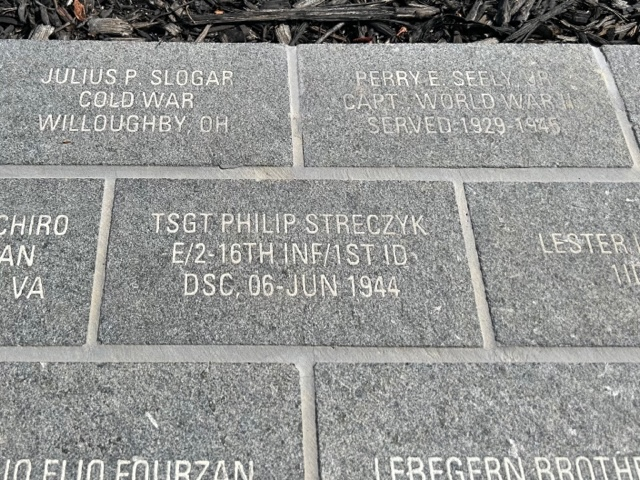
Upper photo: May 2026, Display Case, East Brunswick, NJ. Lower photo: July 2023, Memorial Brick, Fort Belvoir, VA

== Post-war life ==
Streczyk married Sophie Karanewsky at St. Mary of Ostrabrama Church in South River, New Jersey, in 1945 and they had four children. The family spent some time back in East Brunswick, New Jersey, then St. Petersburg, Florida, and moved to Warwick, New York, in the mid-1950s.

Streczyk had frequent nightmares and was in persistent pain from the physical and emotional wounds he sustained during his time in combat. This ultimately led to his suicide on 25 June 1958. Streczyk died in Warwick, New York, and was buried at the Polish Old Catholic Cemetery (later owned by the Church of Religious Science cemetery) off Dunham's Corner Road in East Brunswick. The cemetery rests on a portion of land that the Streczyk family used to own and farm. Streczyk, his brother John (a US Navy veteran) and their parents, as well as several other Polish-American veterans are buried in the same plot.

== Posthumous honors ==
In 2023, East Brunswick High School honored Streczyk with a display case in the lobby featuring two photographs of him, a banner outlining his military accomplishments and a replica memorial mini-brick with an official certificate from the National Museum of the United States Army. The original, full-sized brick was laid down at Warriors Plaza & Field, outside the Museum in Section C-4. A brick for Captain Joseph T. Dawson (Section D-2 of the plaza) and another for 1st Lieutenant John M. Spalding (Section C-4 of the plaza), were also placed together, as all 3 men led the pathway off Easy Red for others to follow.

On November 8, 2024, in honor of the 80th anniversary of D-Day and Veterans Day 2024, Streczyk's son, Ron, received several awards on his father's behalf during a ceremony at VFW Post 133 in East Brunswick, New Jersey.

- The New Jersey Distinguished Service Medal from the NJ Department of Military & Veterans Affairs
- Formal induction as a Distinguished Member of the 16th Infantry Regiment by LTC (ret) Steven Clay, 16th Infantry Regiment Association.
- Proclamation recognizing Philip's service delivered by East Brunswick Township Council President, Kevin McEvoy
- Joint Legislative Resolution honoring Philip's legacy from the New Jersey Legislature sponsored by State Senator Patrick J. Diegnan and Assemblymen Robert Karabinchak and Sterley Stanley.

Afterwards, a brief wreath laying ceremony was conducted at Streczyk's newly cleaned grave to honor and remember his bravery and sacrifice during World War II.

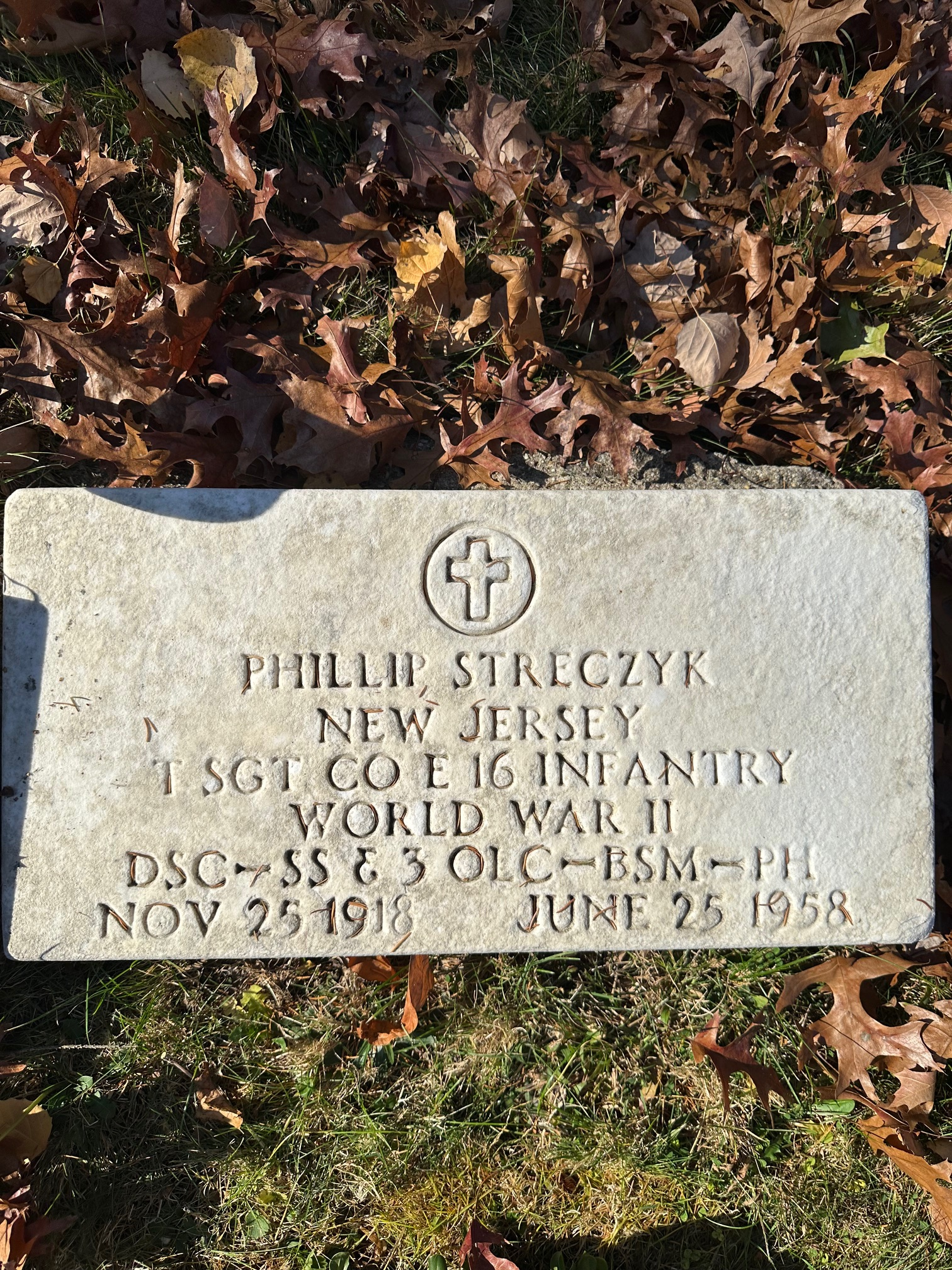
November 2024, Philip's Grave, East Brunswick, NJ

Ahead of the 82nd anniversary of D-Day in 2026, Philip received 3 additional accolades:

- Governor Mikie Sherrill of New Jersey issued a proclamation declaring June 6, 2026 Technical Sergeant Philip Streczyk Day.
- Congresswoman Bonnie Watson Coleman of New Jersey's 12th congressional district submitted remarks on Streczyk's military service that were accepted into the Congressional Record Extension of Remarks.
- Congressman Jamie Raskin of Maryland's 8th congressional district flew an American flag over the US Capitol on June 6, 2026 honoring the life and service of Streczyk.

November 2026, Ron Streczyk with 3 honors for his late father, near Warwick, NY

All 3 honors were framed and presented to his remaining living son, Ron Streczyk, during a 2026 Veterans Day Weekend luncheon at The Landmark Inn in Warwick, NY. The event was hosted by Rumshock Veterans Foundation, a non-profit organization that provides housing and support to local Veterans.
