= Body Rhythm =

Studio album by Marion Meadows
- Released: July 18, 1995
- Genre: Smooth jazz
- Length: 62:42
- Label: Sony BMG / RCA
- Producer: Yasha Barjona; Bob Baldwin; Marion Meadows; Roy Machado; Jacques Burvick

Marion Meadows chronology
Forbidden Fruit (1994)	Body Rhythm (1995)	Pleasure (1997)

Professional ratings
Review scores
Source	Rating
Allmusic	3/5 stars

Body Rhythm is the fourth album by Marion Meadows, released in 1995.

== Track listing ==
1. "My Cherie Amour" - 4:04
2. "Be With You" (Marion Meadows, Yasha Barjona) - 5:33
3. "South Beach" (Meadows, Bob Baldwin) - 5:21
4. "Later On" (Meadows, Dave Schappert) - 1:24
5. "Get Involved" (Baldwin, Meadows) - 4:47
6. "One More Chance" (Barjona, Blake Harris) - 4:57
7. "Kool" (Baldwin, Meadows) - 4:40
8. "Marion's Theme" (Baldwin, Meadows) - 5:21
9. "Wanna Be Loved by You" (Baldwin, Porter Carroll Jr.) - 3:53
10. "Body Rhythm" (Meadows, Roy Machado) - 5:59
11. "Deep Waters" (Richard Bull, Jean-Paul Maunick) - 5:41
12. "Summer's Over" (Baldwin, Dennis Johnson) - 6:28
13. "The Lift" (Meadows, Jay Rowe) - 4:34

== Personnel ==
Musicians and vocalists

- Marion Meadows – soprano saxophone (1–3, 6, 7, 9–13), tenor saxophone (5, 8, 11), alto saxophone (8)
- Yasha Barjona – keyboard programming (1, 2), backing vocals (1, 2, 6), lead vocals (2), keyboards (6), drum programming (6)
- Bob Baldwin – keyboards (3, 5, 8, 9, 12), drum programming (3), acoustic piano (5, 12), additional drums (5), all instruments (7), bass (8), synth bass (12)
- Dave Schappert – acoustic grand piano (4)
- Roy Machado – keyboards (10), drum programming (10)
- Jacques Burvick – keyboards (11), drum programming (11)
- Jay Rowe – keyboards (13), synthesizers (13), guitar synthesizer (13)
- Rohn Lawrence – guitars (8, 13)
- Dave Anderson – 6-string bass (13)
- Lil' John Roberts – drums (5)
- Dennis Johnson – drum programming (5, 12)
- Paul Mills – drums (8, 13)
- Porter Carroll – drum programming (9), vocals (9)
- Kennan Wylie – cymbals (10)
- Bobby Allende – percussion (3, 8)
- Fred Vigdor – saxophones (3, 8)
- John Fumasoli – trombone (3, 8)
- Tony Kadleck – trumpet (3, 8), flugelhorn (3, 8)
- Duke Jones – trumpet (11), flugelhorn (11)
- Asha Puthli – backing vocals (1, 2, 5, 6), lead vocals (5, 6), vocal sweetening (7), vocals (11)
- Blake Harris – backing vocals (2)
- Michelle Moorehead – backing vocals (12)

Music arrangements

- Yasha Barjona – arrangements (1, 2, 6)
- Bob Baldwin – arrangements (3, 5, 7–9, 12)
- Roy Machado – arrangements (10)
- Jacques Burvick – arrangements (11)
- Dave Anderson – arrangements (13)
- Rohn Lawrence – arrangements (13)
- Marion Meadows – arrangements (13)
- Paul Mills – arrangements (13)

== Production ==
- Yasha Barjona – executive producer, producer (1, 2, 6)
- Marion Meadows – executive producer, producer (5, 7–9, 12, 13)
- Bob Baldwin – producer (3, 5, 7–9, 12)
- Roy Machado – producer (10)
- Jacques Burvick – producer (11)
- Jackie Murphy – art direction, design
- Bob London – photography
- Gail D. Butler – management

Technical credits

- Tony Dawsey – mastering at Masterdisk (New York City, New York)
- Yasha Barjona – engineer (1–9, 11–13)
- Billy Moss – engineer (1–9, 11–13), mixing (6, 7, 12)
- Wayne Warnecke – engineer (1–9, 11–13)
- Darroll Gustamachio – mixing (1–5, 8, 9, 11, 13)
- Marion Meadows – mixing (6, 7, 12)
- Roy Machado – recording (10), mixing (10)
- David Rosenblad – mixing (10)
