= For Lovers Only =

For Lovers Only may refer to:

- For Lovers Only (The Temptations album), 1995
- For Lovers Only (Marion Meadows album), 1990
- For Lovers Only (film), a 2011 romance film
