= William Barber =

William Barber, Bill Barber or Billy Barber may refer to:

== Politicians ==
- William Barber (Ontario politician) (1808–1887), Canadian businessman and politician
- William Alonzo Barber (1843–1913), Wisconsin politician, soldier, businessman, banker, and educator
- William Barber (New Zealand politician) (1857–1943), New Zealand MP
- William Barber (Bedford MP) (fl. 1388–1417), English politician
- William Barber (Dunwich MP) (fl. 1403–1429), English politician
- William P. Barber (1907–1984), justice of the Connecticut Supreme Court
- William Edward Barber (1876–1939), Ceylonese lawyer and judge
- William Barber (Illinois politician), member of the Illinois House of Representatives, 1846–1848

== Sports ==
- William Barber (Hambledon cricketer) (1734–1805), English cricketer of the Hambledon Club in the 1760s and 1770s
- William Barber (Sheffield cricketer) (1797–?), English cricketer, played for Sheffield
- William Barber (Nottinghamshire cricketer) (1881–1971), English cricketer who played for Nottinghamshire
- William Barber (cricketer, born 1906) (1906–1981), English cricketer
- William Barber (cricketer, born 1919) (1919–1989), English cricketer
- Bill Barber (born 1952), Canadian ice hockey player
- Bill Barber (tennis) (born 1970), American tennis player
- Billy Barber (boxer) (1928–2004), Australian boxer

== Musicians ==
- Bill Barber (musician) (1920–2007), jazz musician (tuba)
- Billy Barber (musician), keyboardist and composer

== Others ==
- William Barber II (born 1963), minister and social activist
- William Barber (engraver) (1807–1879), Chief Engraver of the United States Mint
- Sir William Barber, 1st Baronet (1860–1927), English solicitor, property developer and philanthropist
- William E. Barber (1919–2002), United States Marine Corps colonel and Korean War recipient of the Medal of Honor
- William Swinden Barber (1832–1908), Gothic Revival and Arts and Crafts architect

== See also ==
- William Barbour (disambiguation)
