= 15th Illinois General Assembly =

Meeting of the Illinois state legislature from 1846 to 1848

The 15th Illinois General Assembly, consisting of the Illinois Senate and the Illinois House of Representatives, met from December 7, 1846, to March 1, 1847.

The 15th General Assembly was preceded by the 14th Illinois General Assembly, and was succeeded by the 16th Illinois General Assembly.

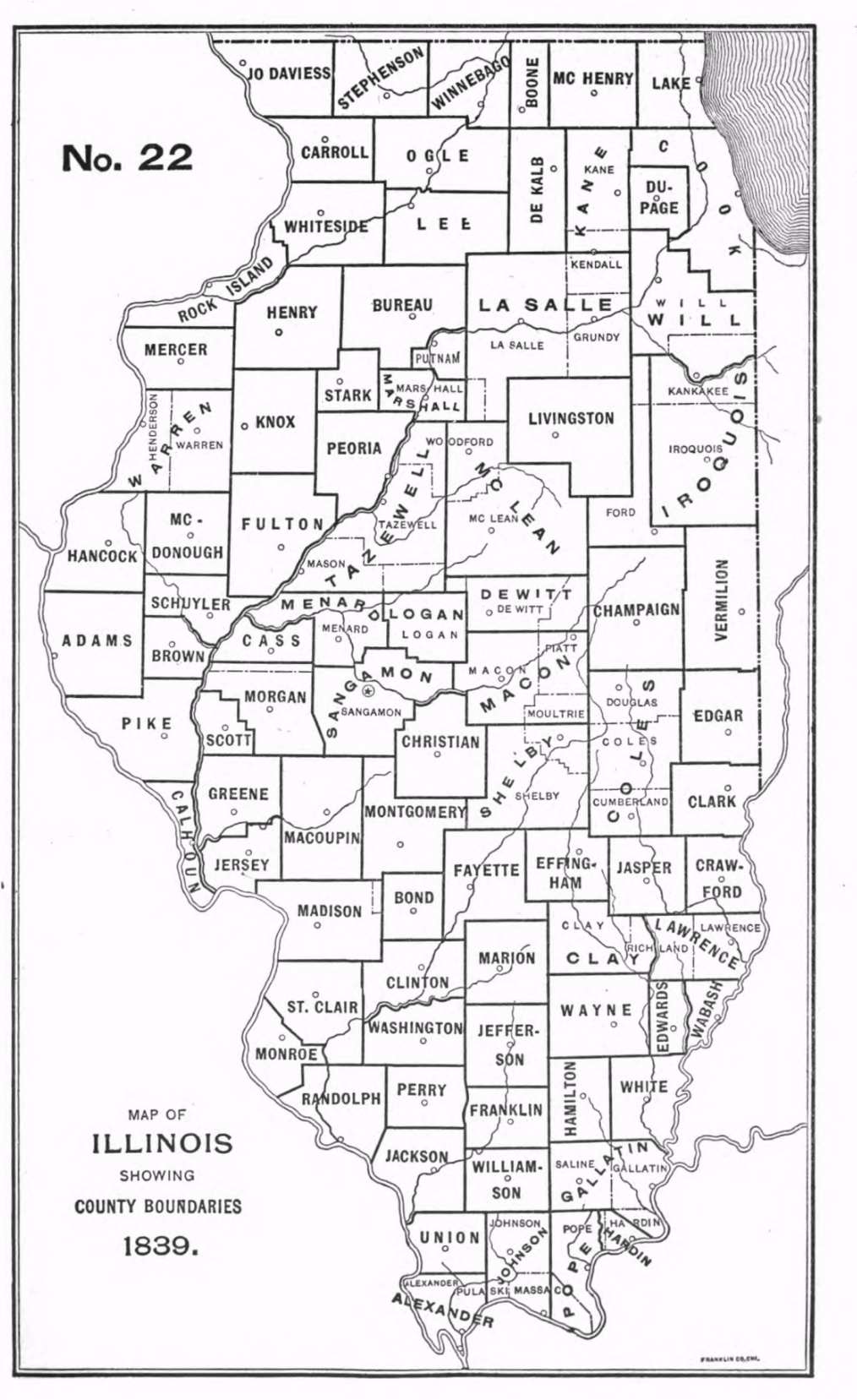
Map of Illinois county boundaries in 1839

== House ==
Seats in District	Counties represented	Image	Representative	Remarks
1	Lake		George Ela	
3	Cook		Jesse J. Everett	
3	Cook		Francis C. Sherman	
3	Cook		Mark Skinner	
4	DuPage · Will · Iroquois		Micajah J. Stanley	
4	DuPage · Will · Iroquois		William E. Little	
4	DuPage · Will · Iroquois		John Miller	
4	DuPage · Will · Iroquois		Elijah Kinney	often listed as Captain Elijah Kinne
3	Kane · Boone · DeKalb · McHenry · Kendall (part)		James Herrington	
3	Kane · Boone · DeKalb · McHenry · Kendall (part)		George W. Kretsinger	
3	Kane · Boone · DeKalb · McHenry · Kendall (part)		James T. Pierson	
3	Grundy · LaSalle · Kendall (part)		William Barber	
3	Grundy · LaSalle · Kendall (part)		James O. Glover	
3	Grundy · LaSalle · Kendall (part)		Ambrose O'Connor	
1	Peoria		Washington Cockle	
1	Peoria · Stark · Bureau		Thomas Epperson	
1	Stark · Bureau		Samuel Thomas	
2	Tazewell · Woodford		Charles C. Wilcox	
2	Tazewell · Woodford		Isaac Williams	
1	Marshall · Putnam		Andrew Wardlaw	
1	Stephenson · Carroll		Robert W. McConnell	
1	Jo Daviess		Abner Eads	
1	Rock Island · Henry		William Bailey	
1	Whiteside · Lee		Hugh Wallace	
1	Winnebago		Robert J. Cross	
1	Ogle		William G. Dana	
1	Schuyler		Lewis D. Erwin	
1	Brown		Joseph Dawson	
1	Brown · Schuyler		John S. Bailey	
5	Adams		Edward H. Buckley	Elected to Marquette County which was to be formed from part of Adams County. Marquette County was allocated 2 seats subsequent to the apportionment of January 14, 1841. As the county was never duly organized, the seats were returned to Adams County after the general election
5	Adams		Wylls H. Chapman	Elected to Marquette County which was to be formed from part of Adams County. Marquette County was allocated 2 seats subsequent to the apportionment of January 14, 1841. As the county was never duly organized, the seats were returned to Adams County after the general election
5	Adams		James M. Seehorn	
5	Adams		William Hendry	Died December 30, 1846
5	Adams		Isaac N. Morris	
5	Adams		John M. Ruddle	Replace Hendry
2	Hancock		Thomas Morrison	
2	Hancock		James Stark	
1	McDonough		William H. Randolph	
2	Warren · Henderson		John Curtis	
2	Warren · Henderson		James Tucker	
1	Knox		Charles Hansford	
1	Knox · Mercer		Ephraim Gilmore	
3	Fulton		Thomas A. Little	
3	Fulton		Even Bailey	
3	Fulton		Reuben R. McDowell	
1	Fulton · Peoria		Henry S. Austin	
4	Sangamon		James N. Brown	
4	Sangamon		Resin H. Constant	
4	Sangamon		Stephen T. Logan	
4	Sangamon		Benjamin West	
1	Menard		James M. Robinson	
1	Logan · Mason		Michale W. Swing	
1	McLean		Matthew Robb	
1	McLean · Livingston		James Robeson	
1	DeWitt		Samuel P. Glenn	
1	Piatt · Macon		William Cantrill	
4	Morgan		Newton Cloud	
4	Morgan		William H. Long	
4	Morgan		Joseph Morton	
4	Morgan		William Thomas	
3	Pike		Alfred Grubb	
3	Pike		William P. Harpole	
3	Pike		James M. Higgins	
1	Cass		Edward W. Turner	
2	Scott		John B. Campbell	
2	Scott		Edward G. Miner	
2	Macoupin		Thomas Hart	
2	Macoupin		Harmon V. A. Tappan	
1	Jersey		Thomas Cummings	
2	Greene		Henry Bragg	
2	Greene		Josiah Caswell	
1	Greene · Calhoun		John D. Fry	
3	Madison		Curtis Blakeman Jr.	
3	Madison		William F. DeWolf	
3	Madison		William Martin	
3	St. Clair		John Reynolds	
3	St. Clair		Samuel Stookey	
3	St. Clair		William H. Underwood	
3	Monroe · Randolph		Robert Mann	
3	Monroe · Randolph		John Morrison	
3	Monroe · Randolph		Edward O'Melveney	
1	Bond		William S. Smith	
1	Montgomery		James M. Rutledge	
1	Christian		Dorice D. Shumway	
2	Fayette · Effingham		Presley Funkhouser	
2	Fayette · Effingham		Frederick Remann	
1	Clay		John M. Griffith	
1	Shelby		William Williamson	
1	White		Samuel S. Hayes	
1	Wabash		Samuel S. Lukins	
1	Wayne		Rigdon B. Slocumb	
1	Edwards		William Pickering	
2	Lawrence · Richland		Michael C. McLean	
2	Lawrence · Richland		Josiah R. Wynne	
2	Crawford · Jasper		Marmontel Boyle	
2	Crawford · Jasper		Eldridge S. Janney	
2	Clark		William B. Archer	
2	Clark		Samuel Prevo	
2	Coles		Usher F. Linder	
2	Coles		Willaim D. Watson	
1	Cumberland		Elisha H. Starkweather	
1	Edgar		Hall Sims	
2	Vermilion		William P. Davis	
2	Vermilion		Samuel Huffman	
1	Champaign		James S. Wright	
2	Union · Alexander		John Hodges	
2	Union · Alexander		Matthew Stokes	
1	Pope · Hardin		William Rhodes†	Died in office on January 4, 1847
1	Pope · Hardin		Joseph Diarman	Replaced Rhodes
1	Johnson · Massac		Enoch Enloe	
1	Williamson		John W. Cunningham	
1	Jackson		John Logan	
1	Franklin		William A. Denning	Resigned
1	Franklin		Walter S. Aiken	Replaced Denning
3	Gallatin		Henry Eddy	
3	Gallatin		Thomas Hicks	
3	Gallatin		William H. Stickney	
1	Hamilton		Samuel S. Marshall	Resigned March 12, 1847
1	Hamilton · Jefferson · Marion		Noah Johnson	
1	Jefferson		Lewis F. Casey	
1	Marion		Henderson P. Boykin	
1	Perry		Hawkins S. Ozburn	
2	Clinton · Washington		Berryman Creele	
2	Clinton · Washington		John White	

== Works cited ==
- Moses, John (1892). Illinois, historical and statistical.
- Blue Book of the State of Illinois. 1919.
- Blue Book of the State of Illinois - Illinois Legislative Roster — 1818-2024 (PDF). 2024. Archived from the original (PDF) on July 15, 2026.
- Laws of the state of Illinois, passed by the twelfth general assembly : at their session, began and held at Springfield, on the seventh of December, one thousand eight hundred and forty. William Walters Public Printers. 1841. pp. 23–25.
- Pease, Theodore Calvin (1923). Statistical Series: Illinois Election Returns (1818-1848). Vol. 1. Illinois State Historical Library.
