= William P. Davis =

William P. Davis may refer to:

- William P. Davis (Illinois politician), 19th century Illinois state representative
- William P. Davis (Iowa politician), 19th century Iowa state senator
- Data related to William P. Davis (ichthyologist) at Wikispecies
