= Another Side of Midnight =

Studio album by Marion Meadows
- Released: April 27, 1999
- Studio: Wayne's World (Pound Ridge, New York); Keo Music Studio (Raleigh, North Carolina); Horizon Studio (West Haven, Connecticut); Johro Studios (West Hills, California)
- Genre: Jazz
- Length: 46:46
- Label: Heads Up
- Producer: Bob Baldwin; Michael Bearden; Johnny Britt; Marion Meadows; Chip Shearin

Marion Meadows chronology
Pleasure (1995)	Another Side of Midnight (1999)	Next To You (2000)

Another Side of Midnight is the sixth album by American jazz musician Marion Meadows, released in April 1999 by Heads Up Entertainment.

== Critical reception ==
Johnathan Widran of AllMusic noted that "just because he's digging the mellower lifestyle of living in Phoenix, don't get the idea that Marion Meadows is about to abandon his urban roots and go new age." Widran praised the "velvety soprano" and "smoky sax" featured in the album. Widran also noted that the album alternated between "dreamy slices of optimism" and "raw first-take ensemble explosions".

Hilarie Grey, writing for JazzTimes, noted the Inak release, stating that Meadows "found an appropriate showcase for his range". They praised Meadows' "captivating leads" and "funk chops", while noting the ensemble of musicians featured in the album. The New Pittsburgh Courier called it "a fresh, street-wise and funky tribute to a night on the town, club-hopping in the city that never sleeps from dusk to dawn".

== Track listing ==
1. "Another Side of Midnight" (Johnny Britt, Marion Meadows) - 4:45
2. "Last Call" (Michael Bearden) - 4:52
3. "Sunset Moon" (Bearden) - 4:28
4. "Club Life" (Meadows, Bob Baldwin) - 5:28
5. "A Secret Place" (Baldwin) - 4:40
6. "The Chase" (Bearden) - 4:25
7. "4:00 A.M." (Bearden) - 4:45
8. "Longing Hearts" (Bearden) - 5:00
9. "Esta Noche" (Baldwin) - 4:40
10. "Sunrise" (Baldwin, Meadows) - 4:30

== Personnel ==
- Marion Meadows – soprano saxophone
- Johnny Britt – keyboards (1), drum programming (1), vocals (1)
- Bob Baldwin – additional keyboards (1), keyboards (4, 5, 9, 10), programming (4), drum programming (5, 10), acoustic piano (9, 10)
- Michael Bearden – keyboards (2, 3, 6–8), drum programming (2, 7, 8), acoustic piano (3, 7, 8)
- Rohn Lawrence – guitars (2, 4, 6, 7, 9)
- Marc Antoine – guitars (3), acoustic guitar (9, 10)
- Norman Brown – guitars (5)
- Chip Shearin – bass (4, 9, 10)
- Omar Hakim – drums (3)
- Alfredo Alias – drums (4, 6, 9)
- Bashiri Johnson – percussion (2, 3, 6)
- Emedin Rivera – percussion (4)
- Dave Samuels – vibraphone (6)
- Tom Browne – trumpet (4)
- Maria Meadows – vocals (3)

== Production ==
- Dave Love – executive producer
- Johnny Britt – producer (1)
- Marion Meadows – producer (1, 4, 5, 9, 10)
- Michael Bearden – producer (2, 3, 6–8)
- Bob Baldwin – producer (4, 5, 9, 10)
- Chip Shearin – producer (4, 5, 9, 10)
- David Newsom – enchanted CD production
- Dietz Design – design
- Tommy Edwards – photography
- Barbara Buranyi – make-up

Technical credits

- Louis F. Hemsey – mastering at GKS Entertainment (Hollywood, California)
- Chip Shearin – recording, mixing (4, 9, 10)
- Vic Steffans – recording
- Wayne Warnecke – recording, mixing (1–3, 6–8)
- Michael Bearden – mixing (1–3, 6–8)
- Marion Meadows – mixing (1–3, 6–8)
- Bob Baldwin – mixing (4, 9, 10)
