= Thomas Hart =

Thomas Hart or Tom Hart may refer to:

== Politics ==
- Thomas C. Hart (1877–1971), U.S. naval admiral and senator
  - USS Thomas C. Hart, a Knox-class frigate
- Thomas N. Hart (1829–1927), mayor of Boston, 1889–1890 and 1900–1902
- Tom Hart (Australian politician) (1904–1972), member of the Legislative Assembly of Western Australia
- Thomas Hart, chief of staff for Bob Ney, see Jack Abramoff
- Thomas Hart (mayor of Davenport) from History of Davenport, Iowa
- Thomas Hart (Illinois politician), 19th-century Illinois state representative
- Thomas Hart (New York politician), in 29th New York State Legislature
- Thomas Hart (North Carolina politician), senator from Orange County, N.C., in the North Carolina General Assembly of 1777

== Sports ==
- Thomas Hart (civil servant) (1909–2001), Scottish cricket and rugby union international
- Thomas Hart (rugby league), see List of Castleford Tigers players
- Tom Hart (Australian footballer) (1896–1971), Australian rules footballer
- Tom Hart (baseball) (1869–1939), American baseball player
- Tom Hart (sportscaster), sports announcer
- Tommy Hart (1944–2024), American football player

== Others ==
- Tom Hart (cartoonist) (born 1969), American comics creator
- Tom Hart (businessman), Scottish businessman, former chairman of Hibernian F.C., see Willie MacFarlane
- Thomas Hart, character in Hart's War
- Thomas Hart (Shakespeare) from Shakespeare's Birthplace
- Thomas Hart, screenwriter of Care Bears: Oopsy Does It!
- Tom Hart (literary agent) from Amelia Atwater-Rhodes

== See also ==
- Thomas Hart Benton (disambiguation)
