= William Bayley (disambiguation) =

William Bayley (1879–1955) was a politician in Manitoba, Canada.

William Bayley may also refer to:

- William Butterworth Bayley (1782–1860), Acting Governor-General of India
- Will Bayley (William John Bayley, born 1988), English para table tennis player

== See also ==
- William Bayly (disambiguation)
- William Bailey (disambiguation)
