= Bill Bailey (disambiguation) =

Bill Bailey is the stage name of English musician, comedian, actor and television presenter Mark Robert Bailey.

Bill Bailey may also refer to:

== People ==
- Bill Bailey (activist) (1910–1995), Irish-American Communist Party labor activist who fought in the Spanish Civil War
- Bill Bailey (American actor) (born 1938), American actor and author
- Bill Bailey (American football) (1916–1990), American football player
- Bill Bailey (dancer), stage name of American tap dancer Willie Eugene Bailey (1912–1978)
- Bill Bailey (Indiana politician) (born 1948), American politician
- Bill Bailey (outfielder) (1881–1967), American Major League Baseball
- Bill Bailey (pitcher) (1888–1926), American Major League Baseball pitcher
- Bill Bailey (rugby league) (1888–1952), Australian rugby league footballer
- Bill Bailey (surfer) (1933–2009), English surfer known as "the father of British surfing"

== Arts and entertainment ==
- "(Won't You Come Home) Bill Bailey", a 1902 song
- No Matter How Much You Promise to Cook or Pay the Rent You Blew It Cauze Bill Bailey Ain't Never Coming Home Again, sometimes shortened to Bill Bailey (including by the author), a 2003 novel by Edgardo Vega Yunqué
- Bill Bailey, a 1986 novel by Catherine Cookson, the first novel in the Bill Bailey series; also the title character
- Cuthbert "Bill" Bailey, a character in Service with a Smile, a novel by P.G. Wodehouse
- Bill Bailey, a character in the 1969 film The Italian Job
- a supporting character in the stage musical Cats

== Other uses ==
- LNWR 1400 Class, a class of locomotives commonly known as Bill Baileys

== See also ==
- William Bailey (disambiguation)
