= Lewis D. Erwin =

American politician

Member of the Illinois House of Representatives
- In office 1856–1862

Member of the Illinois House of Representatives
- In office 1846–1848

Personal details
- Party: Democratic

Lewis D. Erwin was an American politician who served as a member of the Illinois House of Representatives. He served as a state representative for Schuyler county in the 15th Illinois General Assembly after narrowly defeating his Whig opponent William A. Minshall by a vote of 641-639. He served again as a state representative for the 30th district in the 20th, 21st, and the 22nd Illinois General Assemblies.
