= James T. Pierson =

American politician

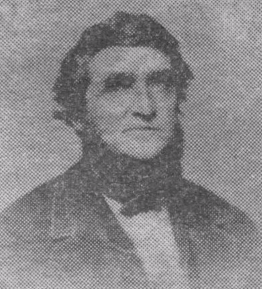

Member of the Illinois House of Representatives
- In office 1846–1848

Personal details
- Party: Democratic

James T. Pierson was an American politician who served as a member of the Illinois House of Representatives. He served as a state representative for Kane, McHenry, Boone, DeKalb, and a portion of Kendall counties in the 15th Illinois General Assembly, one of three representatives elected at-large to represent the county. Pierson was a Democrat.
