= William Rhodes (Illinois politician) =

American politician

Member of the Illinois House of Representatives
- In office August 3, 1846 – January 4, 1847

Personal details
- Died: January 4, 1847

William Rhodes was an American politician who served as a member of the Illinois House of Representatives. He was elected on August 3, 1846 as a state representative for Pope and Hardin counties in the 15th Illinois General Assembly.

He died in office on January 4, 1847 and was replaced by Joseph Diarman.
