= Thomas Hart Benton =

Thomas Hart Benton may refer to:

- Thomas Hart Benton (politician) (1782–1858), American politician, uncle of the Iowa politician, and great-great-uncle of the painter
  - Statue of Thomas Hart Benton, a marble sculpture by Alexander Doyle
- Thomas Hart Benton (Iowa politician) (1815–1879), American politician and Civil War veteran
- Thomas Hart Benton (painter) (1889–1975), American populist muralist
  - Thomas Hart Benton (film), a 1988 documentary film about the painter directed by Ken Burns

== See also ==
- Thomas Hart (disambiguation)
- Thomas Benton (disambiguation)
