= George Ela (Illinois politician) =

American politician

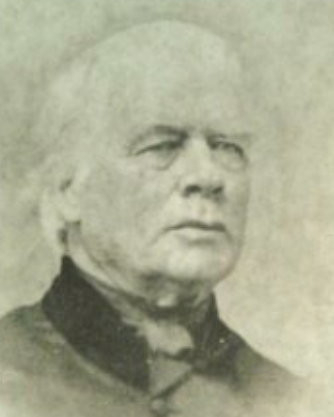

Member of the Illinois House of Representatives
- In office 1846–1848

Personal details
- Party: Democratic

George Ela was an American politician who served as a member of the Illinois House of Representatives. He served as a state representative for Lake county in the 15th Illinois General Assembly. Ela was a Democrat.
