= Marion Meadows =

American saxophonist and composer

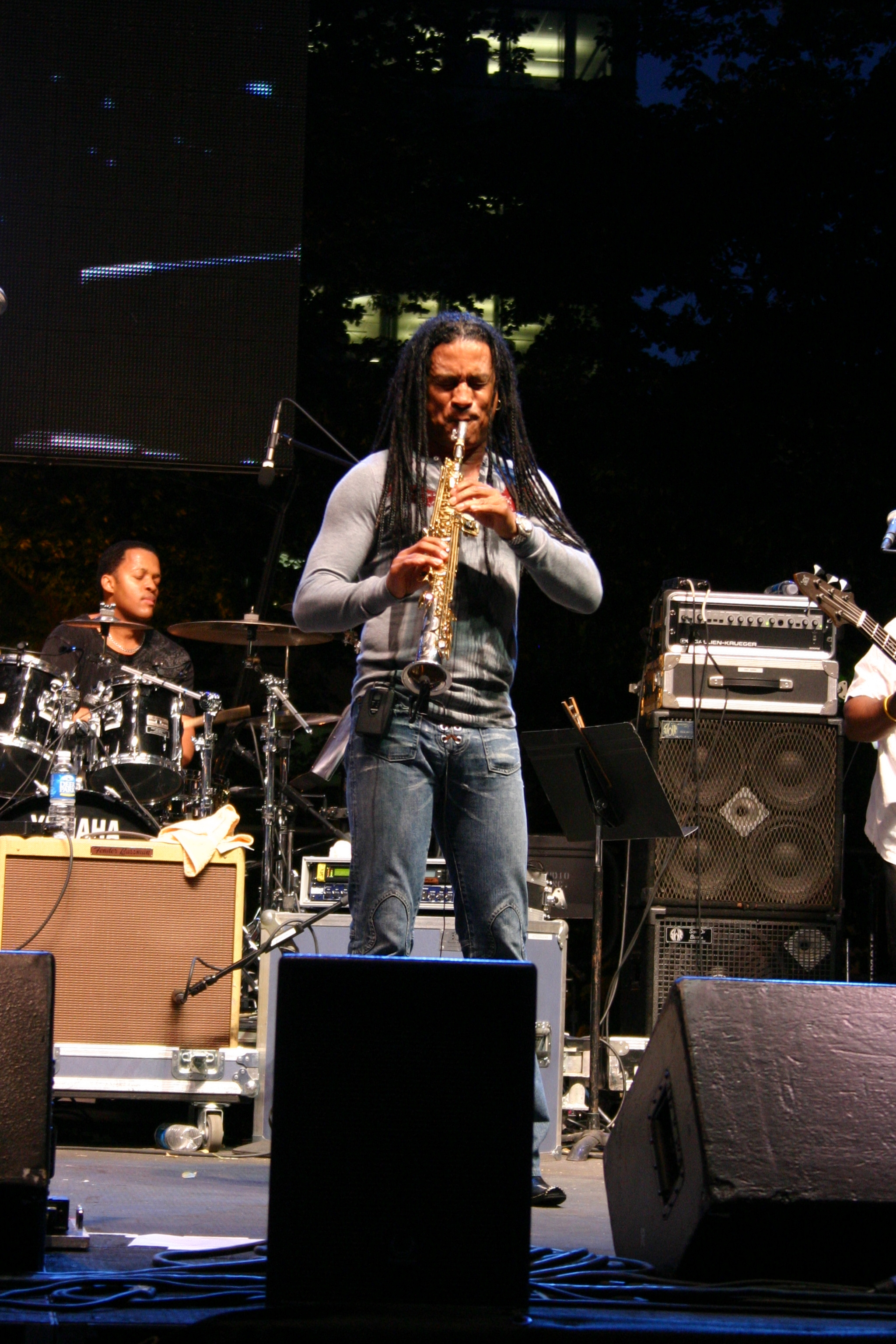

Background information
- Born: July 24, 1962 (age 63); Beckley, West Virginia, US
- Genres: Jazz
- Occupation(s): Musician, composer
- Instrument: Soprano saxophone
- Website: marionmeadows.com

Marion Meadows (born July 24, 1962) is an American soprano saxophonist and composer, mainly in smooth jazz. He was born in Beckley, West Virginia, and grew up mainly in Connecticut. His first album as a leader was For Lovers Only in 1990. He has had several other commercially successful releases, considerable exposure on smooth jazz radio, and has toured internationally.

== Discography ==
- For Lovers Only (1990)
- Keep It Right There (1992)
- Forbidden Fruit (1994)
- Body Rhythm (1995)
- Pleasure (1997)
- Another Side of Midnight (1999)
- Next To You (2000)
- In Deep (2002)
- Player's Club (2004)
- Dressed to Chill (2006)
- Secrets (2009)
- Whisper (2013)
- Soul Traveler (2015)
- Soul City (2018)
- Christmas With You (2019)
- Twice as Nice (2021)
- Just Doing Me (2024)
