= John S. Bailey =

American politician

Member of the Illinois House of Representatives
- In office 1846–1848

Personal details
- Born: September 22, 1814 Pennsylvania
- Died: November 2, 1894 (aged 80) Nebraska

John S. Bailey was an American politician who served as a member of the Illinois House of Representatives.

== Biography ==
Bailey was born on September 22, 1814 in Pennsylvania. In 1846, he was elected as a state representative for Brown and Schuyler counties in the 15th Illinois General Assembly. After serving in the Illinois state legislature, he moved to Sterling, Illinois in 1850 where he worked as an editor. From 1853 to 1858, he served as state's attorney for the Illinois Fifth Judicial Circuit; and then as a judge in the same circuit from 1858 to 1861. He then moved to Macomb, Illinois where he practice law.

== Personal life ==
In October 1842, he married Selena Sweet; they had 8 children. Bailey died on November 2, 1894 in Nebraska.
