= Pleasure (Marion Meadows album) =

Studio album by Marion Meadows
- Released: February 24, 1998
- Studio: The Carriage House (Stamford, Connecticut); Mykee Studios (Mount Vernon, New York); Wayne's World (Pound Ridge, New York)
- Genre: Smooth jazz
- Length: 52:10
- Label: Discovery / Warner Music Group
- Producer: Michael Bearden

Marion Meadows chronology
Body Rhythm (1995)	Pleasure (1998)	Another Side of Midnight (1999)

Professional ratings
Review scores
Source	Rating
AllMusic	3/5 stars

Pleasure is the fifth album by Marion Meadows, released in 1998.

== Track listing ==
1. "January Spring" (Michael Bearden) - 5:33
2. "Get Away" (Bearden, Marion Meadows, Wayman Tisdale) - 5:21
3. "Picture This" (Bearden) - 5:27
4. "Luck Girl" (Bearden, Meadows, Art Dixie) - 5:25
5. "No Other Love" (Bearden, Meadows, Tisdale) - 5:07
6. "Un-break My Heart" (Diane Warren) - 4:47
7. "Gotta Move On" (Bearden, Meadows) - 5:04
8. "U. K. Underground" (Bearden) - 5:08
9. "A Ce Soir" (Bearden, Tom Barney) - 5:00
10. "Child's Play" (Bearden) - 5:18
