= For Lovers Only (Marion Meadows album) =

Studio album by Marion Meadows
- Released: 1990
- Studio: E'lan Productions (Connecticut)
- Genre: Jazz
- Length: 45:18
- Label: Novus
- Producer: Eliot Lewis; Marion Meadows

Marion Meadows chronology
For Lovers Only (1990)	Keep It Right There (1992)

For Lovers Only is the debut album by the American musician Marion Meadows, released in 1990. It peaked in the top 10 on Billboard's Jazz Albums chart. Sharon Bryant sang on "I Found a New Love".

== Critical reception ==
Professional ratings
Review scores
Source	Rating
AllMusic	3/5 stars
Calgary Herald	C+

The Calgary Herald wrote that Meadows "has a decent sense of melody and mixes in a new-age edge to the gentle pop-funk numbers." The Ottawa Citizen deemed the album "electronic schmaltz of little interest." The Dallas Morning News noted that it "may be the quintessential contemporary jazz piece because it encompasses a little bit of everything—jazz, funk, dance."

== Track listing ==
All songs written by Marion Meadows and Eliot Lewis, except where noted.

1. "I Found a New Love" - 5:22
2. "Forbidden Love" - 5:45
3. "Sleepless Nights" (Alan Gorrie, Michael Mugrage) - 5:18
4. "For Lovers Only" - 3:30
5. "The Real Thing" (Porter Carroll, Lewis) - 5:08
6. "Personal Touch" (Lewis) - 4:48
7. "Paradise" - 5:23
8. "Wonderland" - 3:35
9. "Dear World" (Lewis) - 4:08
10. "Just Before Dawn" - 2:21

== Personnel ==
- Marion Meadows – soprano saxophone
- Eliot Lewis – keyboards, guitars, drum programming
- Brian Keane – guitars
- Duke Jones – trumpet
- Sharon Bryant – vocals (1)
- Billy Barber – vocals
- Porter Carroll – vocals
- Alan Gorrie – vocals
- Asha Puthli – vocals
- Debra Gilcrest – vocals

Production

- Eliot Lewis – producer
- Marion Meadows – co-producer
- Steve Backer – series director
- Ron Bach – mastering
- Ria Lewerke – art direction
- Jackie Murphy – design
- Richard Corman – photography
- Betty Cordes – hand lettering
