= Jesse Everett =

American politician

Member of the Illinois House of Representatives
- In office 1846–1848

Personal details
- Party: Democratic
- Nickname: J. J. Everett

Jesse J. Everett was an American politician who served as a member of the Illinois House of Representatives. He served as a state representative for Cook county in the 15th Illinois General Assembly, one of three representatives elected at-large to represent the county. Everett was a Democrat.
