= Enoch Enloe =

American politician

Member of the Illinois House of Representatives
- In office 1846–1848

Personal details
- Party: Democratic

Enoch Enloe was an American politician who served as a member of the Illinois House of Representatives. He served as a state representative for Johnson and Massac counties in the 15th Illinois General Assembly.< Enloe was a Democrat.
