= James O. Glover =

American politician

Member of the Illinois House of Representatives
- In office 1846–1848

Personal details
- Party: Democratic

James O. Glovera was an American politician who served as a member of the Illinois House of Representatives.

Glover served as a state representative for Grundy, LaSalle, and a portion of Kendall county in the 15th Illinois General Assembly after unsuccessfully running for the same seat in the 14th Illinois General Assembly. Glover was a Democrat.
