= James Herrington =

American politician

Member of the Illinois House of Representatives from the 14th district
- In office 1872 – 1884
- Succeeded by: Thomas O'Donnell
- In office 1846 – 1848

Personal details
- Born: June 6, 1824 Mercer County, Pennsylvania
- Died: July 7, 1890 (aged 66) Geneva, Illinois
- Party: Democratic
- Profession: Farmer

James Herrington (June 6, 1824 – July 7, 1890) was an American politician from Pennsylvania. Coming with his family to Illinois at a young age, he joined a Chicago printing house to support his family. He apprenticed under Long John Wentworth and became a prominent Democrat upon his return to Geneva. He served seven consecutive terms in the Illinois House of Representatives and was once a candidate for the United States House of Representatives. When the office was created in 1887, Herrington became the first Mayor of Geneva.

== Biography ==
James Herrington was born in Mercer County, Pennsylvania on June 6, 1824. His father would become one of the founders of Kane County, Illinois. Herrington moved with his family to Chicago, Illinois in 1833. The next year, his father sold the property and purchased a claim west in what is now Geneva, Illinois.

In 1839, his father died, so Herrington moved back to Chicago to apprentice in the printer's trade. He worked in the Chicago Democrat offices for seven years under future Mayor of Chicago and U.S. Representative Long John Wentworth, who became a mentor. In 1846, he was elected as a representative in the 15th Illinois General Assembly representing Kane, McHenry, Boone, and DeKalb counties. Herrington returned to Geneva in 1849, where he was elected Kane County Clerk. He served in this position for eight years, dealing in real estate and publishing on the side. He bought a farm in Blackberry Township in 1863.

Herrington was elected to the Illinois House of Representatives in 1872 as a Democrat. His views on corporate personhood proved popular with his district. He for twelve years in the lower house, finally defeated by Thomas O'Donnell in 1884. Herrington then returned to Geneva. He supported Carter Harrison, Sr.'s campaign for the Democratic nomination for the United States Senate in 1885; the nomination instead went to William Ralls Morrison. Herrington served one last term in the Illinois House from 1886 to 1888.

Herrington was elected the first Mayor of Geneva in 1887, shortly after the town authorized the position. However, he resigned a few months later due to a conflict with the city council over saloon licenses. In 1888, the Democratic Party nominated Herrington to run for the U.S. House of Representatives, but he was defeated in his strongly Republican district.

Herrington married Mary A. Blodgett on January 14, 1850. They had ten children, nine surviving to adulthood. Herrington died on July 7, 1890. He had been suffering from paralysis for the last year, which worsened a few weeks before his death. His death was front-page news on the Chicago Inter Ocean.
