= Samuel Thomas (Illinois politician) =

American politician

Member of the Illinois House of Representatives
- In office 1846–1848

Personal details
- Party: Democratic

Samuel Thomas was an American politician who served as a member of the Illinois House of Representatives.

Epperson served as a state representative for Stark and Bureau counties in the 15th Illinois General Assembly Thomas was a Democrat.
