= James M. Seehorn =

American politician

Member of the Illinois House of Representatives
- In office 1846–1848

James M. Seehorn was an American politician who served as a member of the Illinois House of Representatives. He served as a state representative for Adams county in the 15th Illinois General Assembly.
