= Micajah J. Stanley =

American politician

Member of the Illinois House of Representatives
- In office 1846–1848

Personal details
- Party: Democratic

Micajah J. Stanley (also known as Elijah Kinne) was an American politician who served as a member of the Illinois House of Representatives. He served as a state representative for DuPage, Will, and Iroquois counties in the 15th Illinois General Assembly, one of four representatives elected at-large to represent the counties. Stanley was a Democrat.
