= William Barbour =

William Barbour may refer to:

- William Warren Barbour (1888–1943), United States Senator for New Jersey
- William Boyle Barbour (1828–1891), Scottish merchant and politician
- William H. Barbour Jr. (1941–2021), United States federal judge
- William Barbour Linen Thread Company of Hilden, owned by the family of Milne Barbour
- Billy Barbour (1865–1900), Scottish footballer

== See also ==
- William Barber (disambiguation)
