= William G. Dana =

American politician

Member of the Illinois House of Representatives
- In office 1846–1848

Personal details
- Party: Whig

William G. Dana was an American politician who served as a member of the Illinois House of Representatives.

Dana served as a state representative for Ogle county in the 15th Illinois General Assembly. Dana was a Democrat.
