= McConnell, Illinois =

- Unincorporated community
- Location within Illinois Location within the United States
- Coordinates: 42°26′04″N 89°43′53″W
- Country: United States
- State: Illinois
- County: Stephenson
- Elevation: 771 ft (235 m)
- Time zone: UTC-6 (Central (CST))
  - Summer (DST): UTC-5 (CDT)
- ZIP code: 61050
- Area codes: 815 & 779
- GNIS feature ID: 413218

McConnell is an unincorporated community in Waddams Township in Stephenson County, Illinois. McConnell is 5 miles (8.0 km) southwest of Orangeville, 7 miles (11 km) northeast of Lena and 7 miles (11 km) southeast of Winslow. McConnell has a post office with ZIP code 61050.

== History ==
In 1836, John Dennison claimed 1,000 acres (4.0 km^{2}) east of the Pecatonica River for the purpose of starting a town. The area was heavily timbered and required a saw mill, which was erected north of the grove on a small creek in the spring of the year. This mill, located on Muddy Creek, was operated by Dennison and John Van Zant.

During the following year, Dennison and Van Zant plotted the town with Van Zant acting as surveyor. Stephenson County abstracts prove that the town was to be called either "Pennsylvania" or "New Pennsylvania".

By the spring of 1838, Dennison and Van Zant had made several land improvements and sold all of it, including the mill, to Robert McConnell. McConnell then changed the name to "McConnell's Grove". Due to Galena being the nearest town to acquire supplies and mail, McConnell built a storehouse and went to Galena to purchase goods to start a trading post.

On March 11, 1842, the land Robert McConnell received from Dennison and Van Zant was deeded from the United States to McConnell from the Land Office in Dixon.
