= John M. Spalding =

American politician

- Born: John Martin Spalding Sr. 17 December 1914
- Died: 6 November 1959 (aged 44)
- Military career
- Allegiance: United States
- Branch: United States Army
- Unit: 1st Infantry Division
- Conflicts: World War II: Invasion of Normandy
- Awards: Distinguished Service Cross
- Other work: Kentucky state politician

Member of the Kentucky House of Representatives from the 15th district
- In office January 1, 1948 – January 1, 1952
- Preceded by: Tom Gilliam
- Succeeded by: William E. Maglinger

John Martin Spalding Sr. (often misspelled Spaulding in official Army reports) (December 17, 1914 – November 6, 1959) was an officer in the U.S. 1st Infantry Division during World War II.

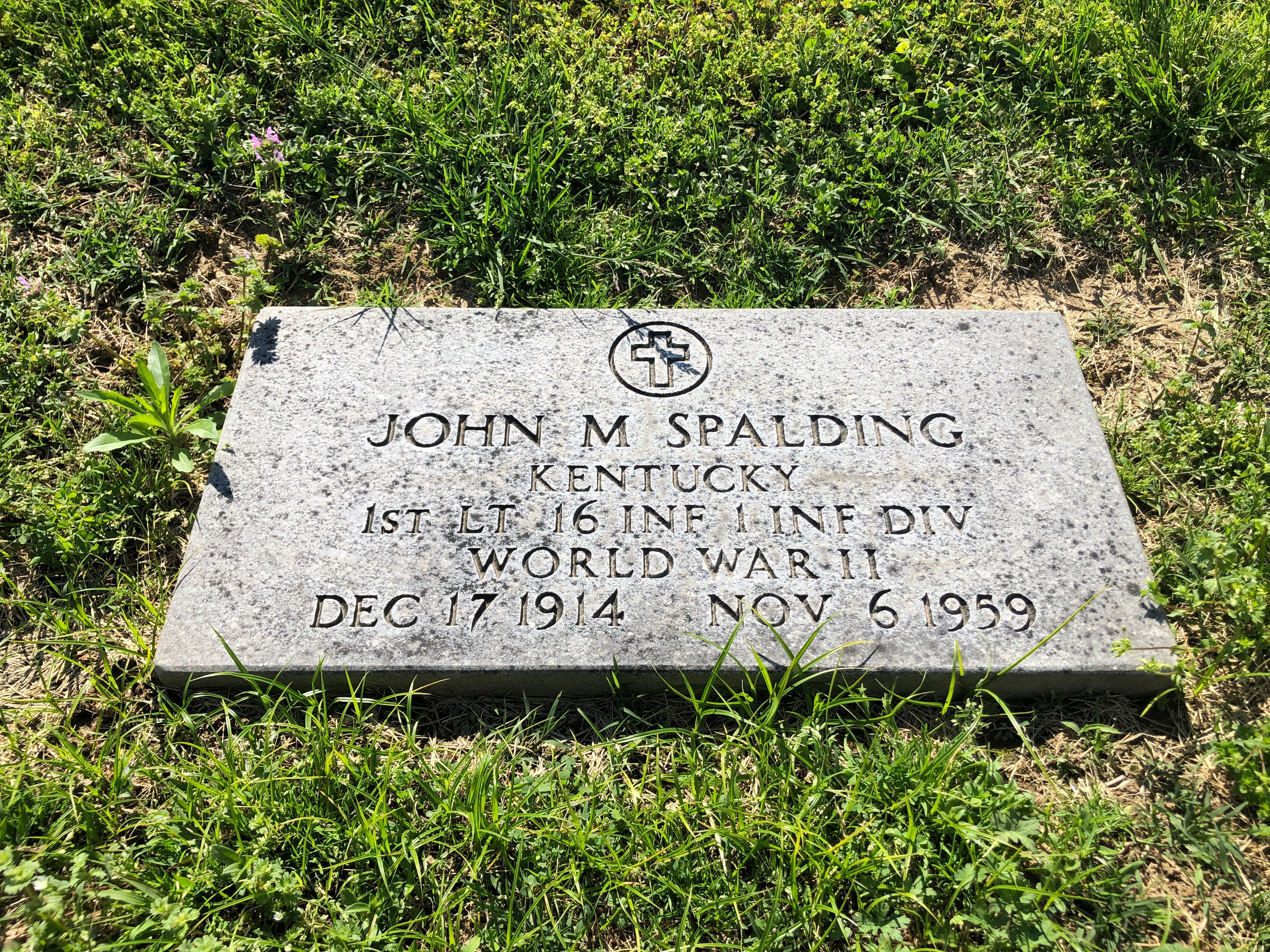
May 2021, Gravemarker in Owensboro, KY

== Biography ==
Spalding was a native of Owensboro, Kentucky. He is famous as one of the first officers (a lieutenant at the time for E Company, 2nd Battalion, 16th Infantry) to make it up to the top of bloody Omaha Beach and clear out German defenses from behind. He and his men, including his sergeant, Philip Streczyk, helped make the breakthrough there on D-Day possible. His platoon landed on the Easy Red sector, and made it to the seawall largely intact, unlike most in the first wave. Instead of attacking up the beach exits, as was planned, he instead helped find and clear a path up the mined bluffs, right of Exit E-1. Once at the top, his team was the first to attack the enemy fortifications from the rear, clearing out trenches and pillboxes along Exit E-1. Later on D-Day he was involved in actions further inland at Colleville-sur-Mer. For his actions on D-Day, he was later awarded the Distinguished Service Cross. After the war, he returned to Kentucky and served in the Kentucky House of Representatives as a Democrat. He was later murdered by his wife Mary Christine Spalding.
