= George W. Kretsinger =

American politician

Member of the Illinois House of Representatives
- In office 1846–1848

Personal details
- Party: Democratic

George W. Kretsinger was an American politician who served as a member of the Illinois House of Representatives. He served as a state representative for Kane, McHenry, Boone, and DeKalb counties in the 15th Illinois General Assembly, one of three representatives elected at-large to represent the county. Everett was a Democrat.
