= Hugh Wallace (Illinois politician) =

American politician

Member of the Illinois House of Representatives
- In office 1846–1848

Personal details
- Party: Democratic

Hugh Wallace was an American politician who served as a member of the Illinois House of Representatives.

Wallace served as a state representative for Whiteside and Lee counties in the 15th Illinois General Assembly. Wallace was a Democrat.
