= Thomas Epperson =

American politician

Member of the Illinois House of Representatives
- In office 1846–1848

Personal details
- Party: Democratic

Thomas Epperson was an American politician who served as a member of the Illinois House of Representatives.

Epperson served as a state representative for Peoria, Stark, and Bureau counties in the 15th Illinois General Assembly Epperson was a Democrat.
