= Joseph Diarman =

American politician

Member of the Illinois House of Representatives
- In office January 28, 1847 – 1848

Joseph Diarman was an American politician who served as a member of the Illinois House of Representatives. He served as a state representative for Pope and Hardin counties in the 15th Illinois General Assembly after winning a special election held on January 28, 1847 to replace William Rhodes who died in office on January 4, 1847.

His surname is also rendered as Dairman.
