= Andrew Wardlaw =

American politician

Member of the Illinois House of Representatives
- In office 1846–1848

Personal details
- Party: Whig

Andrew Wardlaw was an American politician who served as a member of the Illinois House of Representatives.

Wardlaw served as a state representative for Marshall and Putnam county in the 15th Illinois General Assembly after unsuccessfully running for the same seat in the 14th Illinois General Assembly. Wardlaw was a Whig.
