= Forbidden Fruit (Marion Meadows album) =

Studio album by Marion Meadows
- Released: April 25, 1994
- Studio: The Pit (Reseda, California); The Enterprise and Encore Studios (Burbank, California); The B Section (Sacramento, California); Can-Am Recorders (Tarzana, California); Double "Y" Studios (Alhambra, California); Music Grinder Studios (Hollywood, California); The Playhouse (Los Angeles, California); Aire L.A. Studios (Glendale, California); Soundcastle Studios (Silverlake, California); The Carriage House (Stamford, Connecticut); The House of Music (West Orange, New Jersey)
- Genre: Smooth jazz, fusion pop
- Length: 54:07
- Label: Novus Records
- Producer: Christian Warren; Brian Alexander Morgan; Marion Meadows; Joey Melotti; Yutaka Yokokura; Derek Bramble; Michael Bearden; Norman Connors; Werner "Vana" Gierig

Marion Meadows chronology
Keep It Right There (1992)	Forbidden Fruit (1994)	Body Rhythm (1995)

Professional ratings
Review scores
Source	Rating
AllMusic	3/5 stars

Forbidden Fruit is an album by Marion Meadows released in April 1994 on Novus Records. The album rose to No. 7 on the Billboard Contemporary Jazz Albums chart and No. 8 on the Billboard Jazz Albums chart.

== Track listing ==
1. "Red Light" (Christian Warren) - 5:12
2. "You're Always on My Mind" (Brian Alexander Morgan) - 4:52
3. "Asha" (M. Anderson, Marion Meadows, Joey Melotti) - 5:56
4. "Forbidden Fruit" (Meadows, Warren, M. Anderson) - 5:47
5. "Whenever Your Heart Wants to Sing" (Tracy Mann, José Marino, Yutaka Yokokura) - 4:41
6. "You Will Never Know What You're Missing" (Derek Bramble) - 5:09
7. "Back 2 Back" (Michael Bearden) - 5:15
8. "Save the Best for Last" (Phil Galdston, Jon Lind, Wendy Waldman) - 3:34
9. "Somewhere Island" (Bearden) - 4:50
10. "Comin' Home to You" (Bearden) - 4:58
11. "Nocturnal Serenade" (Meadows, Werner "Vana" Gierig) - 3:53

== Personnel ==
- Marion Meadows – soprano saxophone, tenor saxophone (1, 4)
- Christian Warren – programming (1, 4), all other instruments (1, 4), arrangements (1, 4)
- Morris Pleasure – keyboard solo (1), trumpet (11)
- Brian Alexander Morgan – keyboards (2), drum programming (2), backing vocals (2)
- Joey Melotti – keyboards (3), drum programming (3), arrangements (3)
- Don Grusin – acoustic piano (5)
- Derek Bramble – all instruments and programming (6), drums (6), percussion (6) arrangements (6)
- Michael Bearden – keyboards (7, 9, 10), programming (7, 9, 10), acoustic piano (9)
- Bobby Lyle – acoustic piano (8)
- Jerry Peters – keyboards (8), arrangements (8)
- Joe Wolfe – programming (8)
- Werner "Vana" Gierig – acoustic piano (11), keyboards (11), keyboard programming (11)
- "Pocket" – guitars (1)
- Michael Anderson - Additional Keyboards (4)
- John "Jubu" Smith – guitars (2)
- Dori Caymmi – guitars (5)
- Jef Lee Johnson – guitars (7)
- Ricardo Silveira – acoustic guitar (8)
- Jimmy Johnson – bass (5)
- Larry Kimpel – bass (8)
- Victor Bailey – bass (9)
- Mike Shapiro – drums (5)
- Stanley Smith – drums (6), percussion (6)
- Ricky Lawson – drums (8)
- Lionel Cordew – drums (9)
- Munyungo Jackson – African percussion (4)
- Luis Conte – percussion (5, 8)
- Bashiri Johnson – percussion (9)
- Johnny Britt – trumpet (4)
- Yutaka Yokokura – koto (4), arrangements (5)
- Charles Veal – string conductor (8), concertmaster (8)
- The Charles Veal String Orchestra – strings (8)
- SWV – backing vocals (2)
- Eric Benét – lead vocals (6), backing vocals (6)
- "Jilien" – backing vocals (6)

== Production ==
- Skip Miller – executive producer
- Alison Ball-Gabriel – A&R direction
- Christian Warren – producer (1, 4)
- Brian Alexander Morgan – producer (2)
- Marion Meadows – producer (3)
- Joey Melotti – producer (3)
- Hilary Bercovici – associate producer (4)
- Yutaka Yokokura – producer (5)
- Derek Bramble – producer (6)
- Michael Bearden – producer (7, 9, 10)
- Norman Connors – producer (8)
- Werner "Vana" Gierig – producer (11)
- Steve Backer – series director
- Tracey Richards – A&R coordinator
- Ria Lewerke – art direction
- Jackie Murphy – art direction
- Amy Wenzler – design
- Resig & Taylor – photography
- Georgina Quina – hair stylist
- Walt Reeder Productions – management

Technical credits

- Tony Dawsey – mastering at Masterdisk (New York City, New York)
- Hilary Bercovici – engineer (1, 4), mixing (1, 4)
- Christian Warren – engineer (1, 4), mixing (1, 4)
- Larry Funk – engineer (2), mixing (2)
- Yutaka Yokokura – engineer (3), mixing (5, 8)
- Geoff Gillette – recording (5), mixing (5)
- Derek Bramble – recording (6)
- Guy DeFazio – recording (6)
- Craig Burbidge – mixing (6)
- Alec Head – engineer (7, 9, 10), mixing (7, 9, 10)
- Michael Bearden – mixing (7, 9, 10)
- Marion Meadows – mixing (7, 9, 10)
- Barney Perkins – recording (8), string recording (8)
- Elliot Peters – overdub recording (8)
- John Jackson – assistant engineer (2)
- Tom Bender – assistant engineer (7, 9, 10)
- Kate Broudy – assistant engineer (7, 9, 10)
- Phil Magnotti – assistant engineer (7, 9, 10)
- Ron London – mix assistant (7, 9, 10)
- Milton Chan – recording assistant (8)
- Tim Nitz – string recording assistant (8), overdub assistant (8)
