= Black '47 =

Black '47 or Black 47 may refer to:

- Chronology of the Great Famine § 1847, worst year of the Great Irish Famine
- Black '47 (film), 2018 Irish period drama film
- Black 47 (band), American Celtic rock band
