= William Bayly =

William Bayly may refer to:

- William Bayly (astronomer) (1737–1810), English astronomer
- William Bayly (barrister) (1540–1612), English barrister and politician
- William Alfred Bayly (1906–1934), New Zealand farmer and convicted murderer
- W. R. Bayly (William Reynolds Bayly, 1867–1937), educator in South Australia
