= William P. Davis (Illinois politician) =

American politician

Member of the Illinois House of Representatives
- In office 1846–1848

William P. Davis was an American politician who served as a member of the Illinois House of Representatives. He served as one of two state representatives for Vermillion county in the 15th Illinois General Assembly.
