= Thomas Hart (Illinois politician) =

American politician

Member of the Illinois House of Representatives
- In office 1846–1848

Personal details
- Party: Democratic

Thomas Hart was an American politician who served as a member of the Illinois House of Representatives. He served as a state representative for Macoupin county in the 15th Illinois General Assembly. Hart was a Democrat.
