= William Barber (Illinois politician) =

American politician

Member of the Illinois House of Representatives
- In office 1846–1848

Personal details
- Party: Democratic

William Barber was an American politician who served as a member of the Illinois House of Representatives. He served as a state representative for Grundy, LaSalle, and a portion of Kendall counties in the 15th Illinois General Assembly, one of three representatives elected at-large to represent the counties. Barber was a Democrat.

His surname has also been listed as Barker.
