= Billy Bailey (footballer) =

English footballer

Personal information
- Full name: James William Bailey
- Date of birth: 1884
- Place of birth: Basford, Nottingham, England
- Position: Winger

Senior career*
Years	Team	Apps	(Gls)
1904–1905	South Normanton St Michael's		
1905–1906	Clowne Parish Church		
1906–1907	Ilkeston United		
1907–1908	Chesterfield Town	15	(1)
1908–1909	Mansfield Wesleyans		
1909–1910	Mansfield Mechanics		
1910–1911	South Normanton Colliery		
1911	Ripley Town		
1912	Shirebrook		
1913	Mansfield Mechanics		
Total		15	(1)
- * Club domestic league appearances and goals

James William Bailey (1884–unknown) was an English footballer who played in the Football League for Chesterfield Town.
