= WJZZ (FM) =

Radio station in Montgomery, New York

- Montgomery, New York; United States
- Frequency: 88.1 MHz
- Branding: Pulse 87

Programming
- Format: Dance radio

Ownership
- Owner: Hudson Valley Public Radio, Inc.

History
- Former call signs: WGMY (2006–2009); WNYX (2009–2014); WQCD (2014)
- Call sign meaning: Jazz

Technical information
- Licensing authority: FCC
- Facility ID: 89510
- Class: A
- ERP: 1,150 watts
- HAAT: 35 meters (115 ft)
- Transmitter coordinates: 41°28′37.7″N 74°16′8.3″W; 41°26′31.1″N 74°13′41.9″W (APP)
- Translators: W258CU 99.5 (Redwood); W201DO 88.1 (Milford, Pennsylvania)

Links
- Public license information: Public file; LMS
- Website: www.pulse87ny.com

WJZZ is a radio station at 88.1 MHz in Montgomery, New York.

The station, organized as a 501(c)(3), went off the air in September 2018, due to lack of funding; the station briefly broadcast again on August 22, 2019, to keep its license.

In the summer of 2024, WJZZ returned to the air, broadcasting the internet stream of EDM-formatted Pulse 87, thus bringing the format and branding back to terrestrial FM in New York state; "Pulse 87" had been last heard on WNYZ-LD until 2009.

== Translators ==
Call sign	Frequency	City of license	FID	ERP (W)	HAAT	Class	Transmitter coordinates	FCC info
W201DO	88.1 FM	Milford, Pennsylvania	156320	55	−32 m (−105 ft)	D	41°20′10.3″N 74°47′43.5″W	LMS
W258CU	99.5 FM	Redwood, New York	139344	1	0 m (0 ft)	D	40°58′19.3″N 72°20′52.2″W	LMS
