= William Barber (Bedford MP) =

English politician

William Barber (fl. 1388–1417) was an English politician. He sat as MP for Bedford in September 1388 and bailiff of Bedford from 1400 till 1401.

By 1398, he was married to Alice.
