= Robert W. McConnell =

American politician

Robert McConnell (April 2, 1806 – October 15, 1862) was an early settler in Illinois, namesake of McConnell, Illinois. He served as a member of the Illinois House of Representatives from 1846 to 1848. Earlier, on August 6, 1838, he was elected a County Commissioner (known as the County Board of Supervisors) in Stephenson County.

He moved to Waddams Township in Stephenson County, Illinois, United States in 1838. He purchased a land development from John Dennison and John Van Zant. He renamed it McConnell's Grove and started a trading post, which became the current town of McConnell, Illinois.

In 1843 he married 19-year-old Elizabeth, who was born and raised in Jefferson County, Ohio. Elizabeth died on April 19, 1849, at the age of 25. Prior to Elizabeth's death, they had three children. One daughter, named Adeline, died on February 11, 1848, at the age of four. The second child's sex, age and resting place are unknown. The youngest child was a son named William Wylie Moore McConnell. The graves of Elizabeth and Adeline are located at Silent Hill Cemetery in McConnell.

After Elizabeth's death, McConnell met and married Laura Hibbard. Together they had two daughters, Ella Hibbard McConnell and an adopted daughter named Lizzie. Lizzie died on July 11, 1862, at the age of 18.

Robert McConnell's grave is located in the City Cemetery of Freeport, Illinois. Lizzie McConnell's grave is also located there; the resting places of Laura, Ella and William are unknown.
