= William Barber (Dunwich MP) =

English politician

William Barber (fl. 1403–1429) was an English politician. He sat as MP for Dunwich in 1410 and May 1421 and bailiff of Dunwich from September 1408 till 1411, 1412 till 1413, 1415 till 1416, 1419 till 1422, 1424 till 1427, 1429 till 1431, 1433 till 1438, 1441 till 1442 and 1443 till 1444.

He was possibly the son of Andrew Barber. Before May 1422, he married Isabel.
