= Joseph Dawson (Illinois politician) =

American politician

Member of the Illinois House of Representatives
- In office 1846–1848

Joseph Dawson was an American politician who served as a member of the Illinois House of Representatives. He served as a state representative for Brown county in the 15th Illinois General Assembly.
