= William Bailey (Illinois politician) =

American politician

Member of the Illinois House of Representatives
- In office 1846–1848

Personal details
- Party: Whig

William Bailey was an American politician who served as a member of the Illinois House of Representatives.

Bailey served as a state representative for Rock Island and Henry counties in the 15th Illinois General Assembly. Bailey was a Whig.
