= Bill Bailey (rugby league) =

Australian rugby league player

Personal information
- Full name: William Mac Bailey
- Born: 27 January 1888 Newcastle, NSW, Australia
- Died: 5 November 1952 (aged 64) Newcastle, NSW, Australia

Playing information
- Position: Centre / Wing
Club
Years	Team	Pld	T	G	FG	P
1908–09	Newcastle Rebels	15	17	3	0	57
Representative
Years	Team	Pld	T	G	FG	P
1908	New South Wales	2	1	0	0	3
1908	Australia

William Mac Bailey (27 January 1888 – 5 November 1952) was an Australian rugby league footballer.

Bailey, known as "Jerry", was a three-quarter and started playing rugby league as a member of the newly formed Newcastle Rebels in the 1908 NSWRFL season. His first season was good enough to earn him a national call up for the 1908–09 tour of Great Britain, where he was restricted to the minor matches. He scored nine tries for Newcastle in 1909 to help them make the finals, then after the Rebels folded joined the Souths Newcastle club.

A barber by profession, Bailey served three years as president of Newcastle Rugby League and also coached locally during his post-playing career. He is a member of the Hunter Academy of Sport Hall of Fame.

Bailey's grandson, Gary Martine, played for Parramatta in the 1980s.
