= William H. Bailey (artist) =

American artist (1930–2020)

William H. Bailey (November 17, 1930 – April 13, 2020) was an American artist and university professor. He was the Kingman Brewster Professor Emeritus of Art at Yale University. He is best known as a contemporary realist painter.

== Early life ==
Bailey was born in Council Bluffs, Iowa.

He studied from 1948 to 1951 at the School of Fine Arts at the University of Kansas.

His student days were interrupted from 1951 to 1953. Bailey was a sergeant in the United States Army from 1951 to 1953. He served in Japan and Korea.

After his army days were over, he earned a B.F.A. (1955) and an M.F.A. (1957) at Yale. He studied with Josef Albers.

== Career ==
Bailey's career as a working artist developed over time. He was best known as a figurative painter whose work is in major collections, including the Museum of Modern Art in New York, the Museum of Fine Arts in Boston, and the National Museum of American Art in Washington, D.C.

He was a professor of art at Yale from 1969 to 1995. Bailey died in 2020, at the age of 89.

== Selected works ==
In a statistical overview derived from writings by and about Bailey, OCLC/WorldCat encompasses roughly 40+ works in 60+ publications in 5 languages and 2,100 library holdings.

- William Bailey: studio fictions (1999)
- William Bailey: peintures et dessins (2001)
- William Bailey on paper (2006)
