= William Heap Bailey =

Footballer (1847–1926)

Personal information
- Full name: William Heap Bailey
- Nationality: British
- Born: 28 February 1847 Melbourne, Derbyshire
- Died: 1 February 1926 (aged 78)
- Spouse: Louisa Cartlidge

Sport
- Sport: Football
- Updated on 10 December 2014

William Heap Bailey (28 February 1847 – 1 February 1926) was an amateur athlete, born in England, who played for Scotland in the second unofficial football match against England in November 1870.

== Early life and career ==
Bailey was born in Melbourne, Derbyshire, the son of William Heap Bailey and his wife Elizabeth née Worall.

Bailey attended the Derby Mechanics Institution and joined the Civil Service in 1864 as an assistant bookkeeper in the Science & Arts Department. In 1866, he moved to the Civil Service Commission and then in 1869 to the Paymaster General's office.

== Football career ==
Bailey played football for the Civil Service and for Upton Park (from 1868 to 1870), becoming the club captain.

In November 1870, C. W. Alcock and Arthur F. Kinnaird were organising the second "international" match between an England XI and a Scotland XI. Kinnaird had initially selected William Baillie-Hamilton (who also played for the Civil Service) as one of the "Scottish" players, but he failed to arrive in time for the match, to be played at Kennington Oval on 19 November 1870. Despite having little or no Scottish connections, William Bailey was selected to make up the numbers. The Bailey family tradition is that an ancestor had come to England with Bonnie Prince Charlie's army in 1745 and had settled in Derby. In the match report in the Sporting Gazette, Bailey's name is mis-spelt as "Baillie".

The match ended in a 1–0 victory to the English, with the solitary goal coming from R.S.F. Walker.

== Later career ==
In about 1870, Bailey joined the Bass Brewery in Burton-upon-Trent, and later returned to London as their local manager.

There are two mentions of William Heap Bailey in The London Gazette:

- On 16 April 1880, he is mentioned as executor of Thomas Henry Dagg. Bailey is described as a "Brewer" of Burton-on-Trent.
- On 24 July 1900, he is listed as a shareholder in a petition to wind up Doherty Iron Castings Process Limited. He is described as a "gentleman". Other petitioners include Dugald Drummond, the locomotive engineer.

In 1881, he married Louisa Cartlidge; they had one son and two daughters.
