= Bill Bailey (activist) =

American labor activist

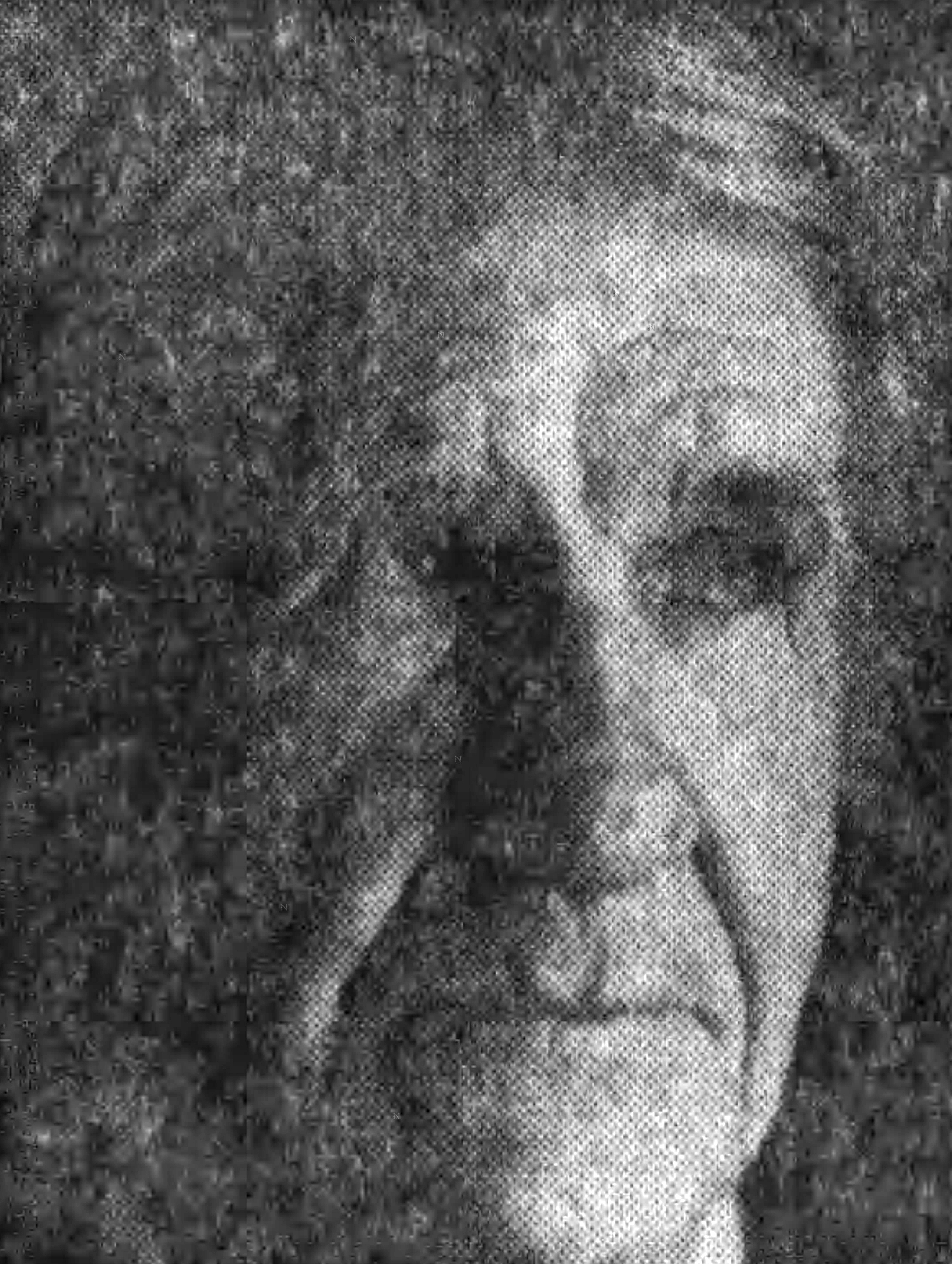
- Bailey c. 1984
- Born: William James Bailey; January 23, 1910; Jersey City, New Jersey, U.S.
- Died: February 27, 1995 (aged 85); San Francisco, California, U.S.
- Military career
- Allegiance: Spanish Republic; United States
- Branch: International Brigades; United States Merchant Marine
- Service years: 1937–1938 c. 1944–1945
- Rank: Commissar
- Unit: The "Abraham Lincoln" XV International Brigade
- Conflicts: Spanish Civil War; Battle of Belchite; World War II; Pacific Theater; Philippines Campaign
- Known for: The Bremen Six
- Political party: Communist Party USA (c. 1930s–1956)
- Spouse: Ruth M.
- Children: Michael

William James Bailey (January 23, 1910 – February 27, 1995) was an Irish-American Communist Party labor activist who fought in the International Brigades of the Republican Army during the Spanish Civil War (1936–1939).

== Early life ==
Bailey was born in Jersey City, New Jersey on January 23, 1910 to an Irish-American Catholic family and grew up in the working class neighborhoods of Hoboken and Hell's Kitchen. He dropped out of school in the fifth grade and began sailing around the age of 15. He also worked briefly as a longshore worker in New York City. Bailey stated that he was initially drawn to sailing because he had grown up in poverty and the job guaranteed regular meals while he was growing.

== Career and activism ==
Bailey stated that his first exposure to radical ideas was when he met a Wobbly while sailing in Houston, Texas. Motivated by his desire to fight poverty, he joined the Marine Workers Industrial Union (MWIU) in 1932 and the Communist Party in the same period. After the 1934 West Coast Waterfront Strike, the MWIU disbanded and Bailey joined the International Seamen's Union (ISU). In 1935, Bailey participated in an anti-Nazi demonstration against the SS Bremen in New York, tearing the Nazi flag from the jackstaff and tossing it into the Hudson River. He was expelled from the ISU for being a communist.

After being expelled from the ISU in New York, Bailey sailed to the West Coast and served on the strike committee during the 1936 Pacific Maritime Strike. Following the strike, Bailey was sent by the Communist Party to Honolulu. In Hawaii, he helped Filipino sugar workers on Maui organize an unsuccessful strike. Bailey fled Hawaii to avoid being charged with criminal syndicalism for his role in the strike, which likely would have landed him in prison for life.

After leaving Hawaii, Bailey went on to fight in the Abraham Lincoln Brigade, the American contingent of the International Brigades during the Spanish Civil War.

During World War II, Bailey served as a business agent for the Marine Firemen, Oilers and Watertenders Union (MFOW), before he joined the war effort during the invasion of the Philippines. He attended school to become a United States Merchant Marine. He became a third assistant engineer and served on liberty ships during the war, including the SS John Paul Jones, SS Samuel Gompers, and the SS George Powell, as well as the victory ship SS Laredo Victory. His wartime service brought him to Okinawa at the conclusion of the war. Bailey was critical of the political positions taken by the Communist Party during the war, described by himself and other critics as class collaborationist, but he remained a Party member.

After World War II, Bailey returned to working as a marine electrician but was blacklisted as a communist and unable to continue sailing after the Korean War broke out. He was expelled from the MFOW during the McCarthy era, and briefly edited The Black Gang News before moving to longshore work. After talking to Louis Goldblatt, Bailey found work in longshoring first in Eureka, California, and later in San Francisco. He later became the vice president of ILWU, local 10.

Bailey left the Communist Party around 1956 due to a growing culture of paranoia caused by the Red Scare. He remained active in the labor movement and left-wing politics.

== Later life and death ==
Bailey retired in 1975. On February 27, 1995, he died of a long-lasting pulmonary condition caused by asbestos exposure during his work as a seaman.

== Works and features ==
Bailey's autobiography, The Kid from Hoboken, was written with Lynn Damme and published in San Francisco by Circus Lithographic Prepress in 1993. The full text is available online.

Bailey was interviewed in 1981 by sociologist Howard Kimeldorf for his book Reds or Rackets?. The full interview is available on the Internet Archive.

Bailey was featured in the film documentaries Seeing Red (1983) and The Good Fight: The Abraham Lincoln Brigade in the Spanish Civil War (1984).

Bailey's story is told in "The Agitator: William Bailey and the First American Uprising against Nazism" by Peter Duffy (PublicAffairs, March 2019).

== See also ==
- Abraham Lincoln Brigade
- International Brigades
- Spanish Civil War
- Communist Party USA
- Marine Firemen, Oilers and Watertenders Union (MFOW)
- The invasion of the Philippines
