= Bob Baldwin (musician) =

American jazz pianist

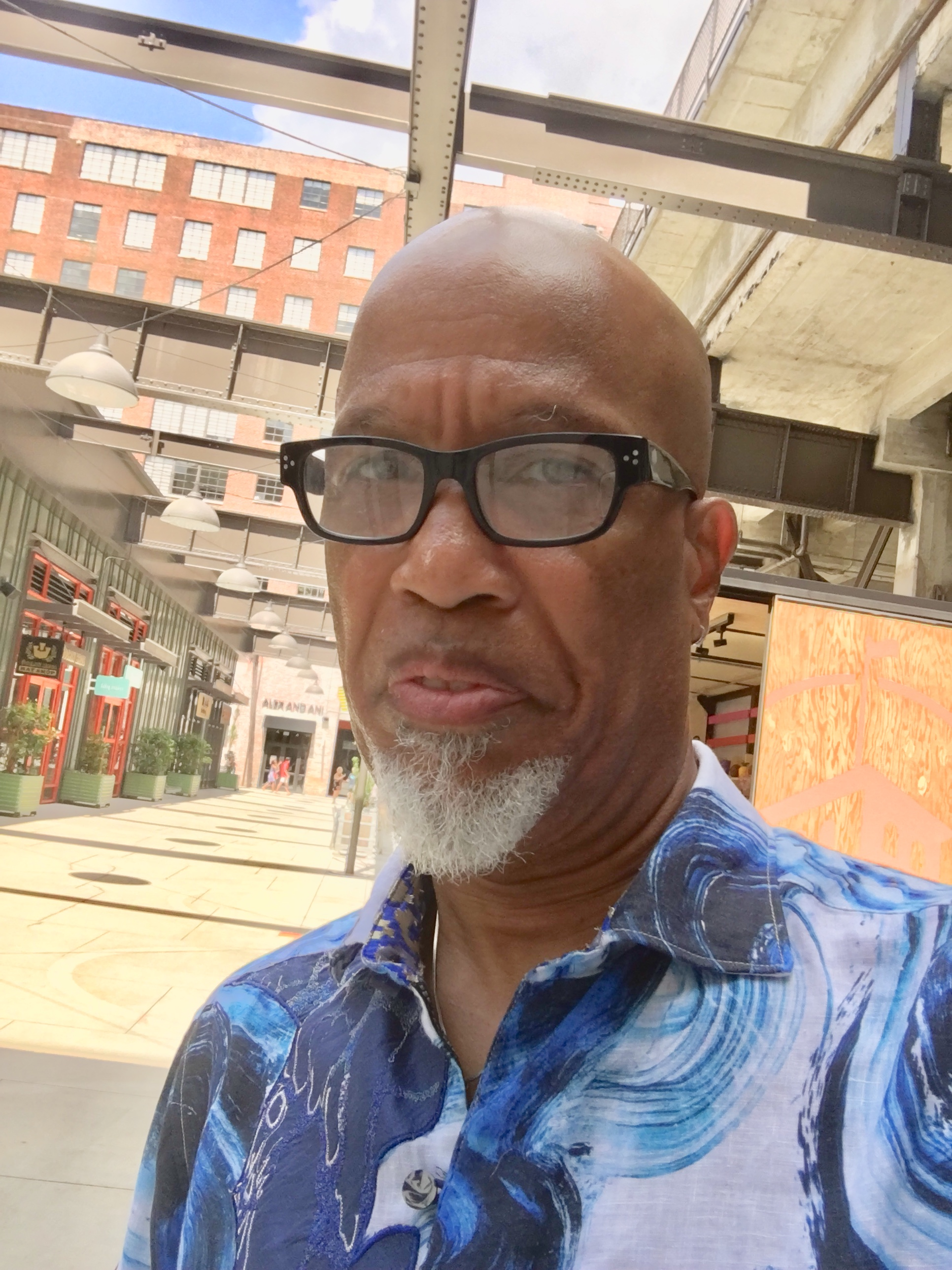

Background information
- Born: Robert G. Baldwin, Jr. December 9, 1960 (age 65); Mount Vernon, New York, U.S.
- Genres: Jazz, urban, instrumental gospel
- Occupations: Musician, arranger, producer, radio host
- Instruments: Piano, Keyboards, Keyboard programming
- Years active: 1988–present
- Labels: Label and distribution deals include Atlantic, 215, Shanachie, Malaco, CSI, Narada, Nu Groove, Peak, Trippin' N' Rhythm, Orpheus, A440, Distribution 13, BFE, City Sketches Records, The Orchard/Sony Music
- Website: www.bobbaldwin.com

Robert Baldwin (born December 9, 1960) is an American contemporary jazz pianist, composer, music producer, author, radio host, and creator of the NewUrbanJazz Lounge and City Sketches Inc. His music is distributed by Sony Music.

Baldwin's debut album, A Long Way to Go, was released in 1988. All but seven discs in his solo recording catalog are owned by his label, City Sketches. Baldwin has won five SESAC Music Awards, for his 2002–2003 airplay of "The Way She Looked at Me", his 2008 airplay on NewUrbanJazz.com, his 2010 album, Never Can Say Goodbye: A Tribute to Michael Jackson, in 2011 for NewUrbanJazz.com2/Re-Vibe, and his 2013 album Twenty. His 2015 release, MelloWonder: Songs in the Key of Stevie, which honors Stevie Wonder, debuted at No. 16 on the Billboard Overall Jazz Chart.

Since 2018, he has charted on eight Billboard Smooth Jazz Top-10 hit records as either producer/arranger or composer. Baldwin completed 11 albums in January 2026, subtitled the Urban Jazz Music Series. His radio single "HEPnotic (Hep is the new Hip/100 years of Cool)", from his album BSpoke, peaked at #1 on the Billboard Smooth Jazz Radio Airplay chart on August 8, 2026.

Throughout his career, Baldwin has collaborated with a wide range of jazz, R&B, soul, and contemporary music artists, both on his own recordings and through his work as a pianist, composer, arranger, and producer. His recording and songwriting credits include collaborations with Azymuth, Blaque, Bob James, Brian Tarquin, Brooke Alford, Buddy Williams, Café Soul All Stars, Chieli Minucci, Chuck Loeb, Dean James, Dee Brown, Dennis Bell, Edson da Silva, Eric Essix, Euge Groove, Freddie Jackson, Freddy V., Gabriel Mark Hasselbach, Gary Palmer, Gerald Albright, Gil Parris, Grover Washington Jr., Howard Hewett, Jarrard Anthony, Joey Sommerville, John Dukich, Jon Lucien, Kim Scott, Leo Gandelman, Lynette Washington, Madoca, Marc Antoine, Maree, Marian Hill, Marion Meadows, Mel Holder, Melba Moore, Michał Urbaniak, Norman Brown, Paul Brown, Phil Perry, Pieces of a Dream, PJ Spraggins, Porter Carroll Jr., Ragan Whiteside, Regg Henny, Regina Carter, Rhonda Smith, Richard Elliot, Rohn Lawrence, Ron King, Roy Ayers, Sharon Bryant, Sol, SOS All-Stars, Soul Providers, Tene Williams, The 3 Keys, The Four Tops, Tom Browne, Toninho Horta, Torcuato Mariano, U-Nam, Whistle, Will Downing, YahZarah, and Zoiea Ohizep.

== Early life and education ==
Baldwin grew up in a musical household in Westchester County, New York. His father, Robert Garfield Baldwin Sr. (1926–2008), was an engineer and jazz pianist who performed with musicians including Keter Betts, Art Davis, Carmen Leggio and Jimmy Hill. Baldwin began learning piano from his father at approximately four years old, receiving early instruction in both classical music and jazz standards.

Baldwin's broadcasting career began while attending Geneva College in Beaver Falls, Pennsylvania, where he studied business administration and broadcast communication. From 1979 to 1980, he hosted his first radio program on WGEV, the college's FM radio station, working as a jazz disc jockey. WGEV was an educational FM station owned by the Geneva College Board of Trustees.

Baldwin later returned to New York, where he continued developing his broadcasting experience. His early work at WGEV preceded his subsequent involvement in commercial radio and, later, the establishment of the syndicated *NewUrbanJazz Lounge* radio program.

== Career ==
In September 1981, Baldwin secured a radio internship at Inner City Broadcasting (WLIB/WBLS) in New York City, then owned by Tuskegee Airman Percy Sutton. In 1981–1983, he worked briefly at WINS, where he pulled news wire for the staff writers. In 1984, he was a field news reporter in Westchester County for WVIP Radio, then located in Mount Kisco, New York.

In 1986, Baldwin performed briefly in Tom Browne's band at The Bottom Line in New York City, and in 1987, Browne asked Baldwin to participate on "No Longer I" for Browne on the short-lived Malaco Records Jazz Label.

Between March and September 1986, Baldwin, along with New York–based guitarist Al Orlo, created the Bob Baldwin/Al Orlo Project, and they performed on Sundays at the Crazy Horse, a small rock and roll club in New Rochelle, New York owned by Vincent Pastore.

In 1986, Baldwin and Orlo opened up for trumpeter Tom Browne at The Bottom Line, based in New York City. From that performance, Browne hired Baldwin to play in his band, and later collaborated with him on his disc No Longer I, a Gospel-Jazz recording in 1987. Through those sessions, he met Danny Weiss, the president of Malaco Jazz. In 1988, they co-produced Baldwin's first album, I've Got a Long Way to Go, released on Malaco Records. The project won the Sony Innovators Award in 1989, an annual award given to aspiring African-American artists who have shown outstanding talent in music and the visual arts, selected by Roberta Flack.

In 1990, Baldwin worked briefly with keyboardist Kashif. In 1989-1990, he was hired by Kashif to play demo parts; keyboards and piano on a recording project by a new group called The Promise (Arista Records) featuring vocalist Joi Cardwell, but the project was never released.The project was Executive Produced by Clive Davis. Per AllMusic, AllMusic’s Joi Cardwell biography states that producer Kashif recruited Cardwell for The Promise in 1989, that the group recorded an album, and that the album was never released.

With the help of Weiss and David Wilkes, along with producer Larry Maxwell, Baldwin secured his first artist solo deal with Atlantic Jazz, then presided by Sylvia Rhone. He produced 2 discs for in 1990 and 1992 (Rejoice and Reflections of Love). Reflections charted top-20 on the Billboard Contemporary Jazz Charts.

In 2000, he co-wrote and co-produced two songs on Will Downing's All the Man You Need album, which was nominated for a Grammy Award in 2000 (Best Traditional R&B Album). He has also contributed as composer, co-producer and performer on Ragan Whiteside's Treblemaker.

Between 1998 and 2004, he wrote, sang and produced the CD101.9 jingle. In 2004, he was hired by Glenn Cherry, owner of Tama Broadcasting as the music director at WJSJ in Jacksonville, Florida.

In 2005, Baldwin assisted in launching Bermuda’s first smooth jazz radio station, KJAZ 98.1 FM, operated by LTT Broadcasting Co. Ltd. and led by broadcaster Leo Trott. In 2007 he served as music director at WCLK in Atlanta and later worked at WJZZ until its format change in 2009.

From 2007-2009, he was hired at WJZZ, a Radio-One company.

Baldwin launched NewUrbanJazz Lounge in October 2008. The program is a two-hour contemporary jazz show that has aired on terrestrial stations in the United States, including affiliates in Alabama, Tennessee, and North Carolina, and later expanded to additional markets.

In 1997, Baldwin founded the music production company City Sketches, Inc. That year, he released his first independently produced album, Welcome to the Games, inspired by the 1996 Summer Olympics in Atlanta. In 2000, he released BobBaldwin.com, using the name of his website as the album title as part of an early effort to integrate his music and online presence.

During the 2000s, several of Baldwin's albums appeared on Billboard's Contemporary Jazz Albums chart, including BobBaldwin.com (2000), Standing Tall (2002), Brazil Chill (2004), NewUrbanJazz.com (2008), Never Can Say Goodbye: A Tribute to Michael Jackson (2010), NewUrbanJazz.com2: Re-Vibe (2011), Betcha by Golly Wow/The Music of Thom Bell (2012), Twenty (2013), The Brazilian-American Soundtrack (2016), and Bob Baldwin Presents Abbey Road and the Beatles (2018).[1]

Baldwin recorded two albums, Brazil Chill (2004) and All in a Day's Work (2005), in association with the Chicago-based A440 Music Group. City Sketches subsequently reacquired the rights to the recordings following the label's closure.[2]

In 2009, City Sketches entered into an arrangement with the UK-based Trippin' 'n Rhythm Records. Baldwin subsequently released Never Can Say Goodbye: A Tribute to Michael Jackson in 2010 and NewUrbanJazz.com2: Re-Vibe in 2011 through the label.

Baldwin released Twenty, his 20th album, in 2013 through Distribution 13/Lillian Industries. City Sketches later filed a lawsuit concerning distribution royalties arising from the agreement; the dispute was subsequently settled out of court.

In 2015, City Sketches entered into a distribution arrangement with Red River Entertainment for physical releases from Baldwin's catalog. The label's digital catalog has also been distributed through The Orchard, a music distribution company owned by Sony Music Entertainment.[3]

In 2018, City Sketches acquired the rights to two earlier Baldwin recordings previously associated with Shanachie Records, Cool Breeze (1997) and Bob Baldwin Presents the American Spirit (2002)."Bob Baldwin Presents Abbey Road and The Beatles". Pro-jazz Club. 2018.

In 2024, City Sketches released two Baldwin albums, Songs My Father Would Dig and It's Okay to Dream, both on June 28. Songs My Father Would Dig was presented as a mainstream jazz project, while It's Okay to Dream continued Baldwin's contemporary jazz work."Songs My Father Would Dig – Album by Bob Baldwin". Apple Music. 28 June 2024."It's Okay to Dream – Album by Bob Baldwin". Apple Music. 28 June 2024.

City Sketches later released a series of 11 recordings under the Smooth Jazz Architects name, with individual projects centered on cities including New York, Philadelphia, Dayton, Chicago, Atlanta, Washington, D.C., Detroit, Asheville, Nashville, London and New Orleans."Bob Baldwin". BobBaldwin.com.

== Other activities ==
Baldwin has also been involved in music event planning and has curated jazz concert series in partnership with municipalities including Greenburgh, White Plains, Asbury Park, Riviera Beach, and Mount Vernon. In 2006, he was announced as an endorser of Baldwin Piano, which was then owned by Gibson Guitar Corporation.

In 2009, Baldwin authored You Better Ask Somebody, a book drawing on his experiences in the music business and addressing the professional and business aspects of the recording industry.

== Discography (albums) ==
Disc #	Year	Album	Label	Billboard / MRC Chart Activity	Original Label / Distribution
01	1989	A Long Way to Go/The Dream	Malaco	—	Malaco
02	1990	Rejoice	Atlantic Jazz	—	Atlantic Jazz
03	1992	Reflections of Love	Atlantic Jazz	#7 Billboard Contemporary Jazz Albums	Atlantic Jazz
04	1993	State of Mind	CSI	—	Atlantic Jazz
05	1996	City Sketches I / Welcome to the Games	CSI	—	City Sketches (CSI) Records
06	1997	Cool Breeze	CSI	—	Formerly distributed/currently owned by Shanachie
07	2000	For You (UK Release)	Expansion	—	Expansion
08	2000	BobBaldwin.com	CSI	#13 Billboard Contemporary Jazz Albums	Distributed by Orpheus Records
09	2002	Bob Baldwin Presents the American Spirit	CSI	—	Formerly distributed/currently owned by Shanachie
10	2002	Standing Tall	Narada	#8 Billboard Contemporary Jazz Albums	Narada
11	2004	Brazil Chill	CSI	#9 Billboard Contemporary Jazz Albums	A440
12	2005	All in a Day’s Work	CSI	#15 Billboard Contemporary Jazz Albums	NuGroove
13	2007	The Sanctioned Bootleg – Live	CSI	—	Distributed by Nu Groove
14	2007	Soul Providers Featuring Bob Baldwin/Smooth Urban Grooves	Import	—	Distributed by Koch Records
15	2007	Memoirs from the Hudson (DVD)	Nu Groove	—	Distributed by Nu Groove
16	2008	NewUrbanJazz.com	Nu Groove	#7 Billboard Contemporary Jazz Albums	Distributed by Nu Groove
17	2009	Lookin’ Back	CSI	—	Distributed by Nu Groove
18	2009	Bob Baldwin (3-disc compilation)	Nu Groove	—	Nu Groove
19	2010	Never Can Say Goodbye: A Tribute to Michael Jackson	Trippin’ ’n Rhythm	#6 Billboard Contemporary Jazz Albums	Distributed by Trippin’ ’n Rhythm
20	2011	NewUrbanJazz.com2: Re-Vibe	CSI	#4 Billboard Contemporary Jazz Albums	Distributed by Trippin’ ’n Rhythm
21	2012	Never Out of Season	CSI	—	City Sketches (CSI) Records
22	2012	Betcha by Golly Wow/The Music of Thom Bell	Peak	#11 Billboard Contemporary Jazz Albums	Peak Records
23	2012	The Gift of Christmas	CSI	—	City Sketches (CSI) Records
24	2013	Twenty	CSI/BFE	#3 Billboard Contemporary Jazz Albums	City Sketches (CSI) Records
25	2015	MelloWonder / Songs in the Key of Stevie	CSI/BFE	#16 Billboard Contemporary Jazz Albums	City Sketches (CSI) Records
26	2016	The Brazilian-American Soundtrack (2-CD Set)	CSI/BFE	#14 Billboard Contemporary Jazz Albums	City Sketches (CSI) Records
27*	2017	Never Can Say Goodbye (Remixed and Remastered)	CSI/BFE	—	City Sketches (CSI) Records
28*	2017	Never Out of Season (Remixed and Remastered)	CSI	—	City Sketches (CSI) Records
29	2018	Bob Baldwin Presents Abbey Road and the Beatles	CSI/BFE	#10 Billboard Contemporary Jazz Albums	City Sketches (CSI) Records
30*	2018	Welcome to the Games (Remixed and Remastered)	CSI	—	City Sketches (CSI) Records
31	2020	Henna	CSI	—	City Sketches (CSI) Records
32	2021	NewUrbanJazz 3 / An UrbanSmooth Suite	CSI	#4 Current Contemporary Jazz Chart (MRC Data)	City Sketches (CSI) Records
33	2022	The Stay at Home Series, Vol. 1 (Live)	CSI	JMA Best Contemporary Jazz Album	City Sketches (CSI) Records
34	2022	B Positive	CSI	—	City Sketches (CSI) Records
35	2023	We 3 Keys — with Gail Jhonson & Phil Davis	Shanachie	—	Shanachie
36	2024	It’s Okay to Dream	CSI	—	City Sketches (CSI) Records
37	2024	Songs My Father Would Dig	CSI	—	City Sketches (CSI) Records
—	2026	Sketches of New York City, The Big Apple — w/ Smooth Jazz Architects	CSI	—	City Sketches (CSI) Records
—	2026	Sketches of Philadelphia, the City of Brotherly Love — w/ Smooth Jazz Architects	CSI	—	City Sketches (CSI) Records
—	2026	Sketches of Funky Dayton — w/ Smooth Jazz Architects	CSI	—	City Sketches (CSI) Records
—	2026	Sketches of Chi-Town — w/ Smooth Jazz Architects	CSI	—	City Sketches (CSI) Records
—	2026	Sketches of the ATL — w/ Smooth Jazz Architects	CSI	—	City Sketches (CSI) Records
—	2026	Sketches of Washington DC — w/ Smooth Jazz Architects	CSI	—	City Sketches (CSI) Records
—	2026	Sketches of Detroit, the Motor City — w/ Smooth Jazz Architects	CSI	—	City Sketches (CSI) Records
—	2026	Sketches of Ashville — w/ Smooth Jazz Architects	CSI	—	City Sketches (CSI) Records
—	2026	Sketches of Nashville — w/ Smooth Jazz Architects	CSI	—	City Sketches (CSI) Records
—	2026	Sketches of London Underground — w/ Smooth Jazz Architects	CSI	—	City Sketches (CSI) Records
—	2026	Sketches of New Orleans — w/ Smooth Jazz Architects	CSI	—	City Sketches (CSI) Records
38	2026	B Spoke	CSI	—	City Sketches (CSI) Records
39	2026	NewUrbanJazz 4 / MasterPlan	CSI	Release date TBA	City Sketches (CSI) Records

== Top 30 Radio Singles (As Lead Artist, Record Producer, Arranger and/or Composer) ==
=== c) June 2009 - current - Billboard Smooth Jazz Airplay, with Mediabase ===
Year	Artist	Song	Chart Activity	Contribution
1993	Bob Baldwin feat. Marion Meadows & Will Downing	“Wishing You Were Here”	Top 10 Billboard Smooth Jazz Radio	Artist / Producer / Arranger
2003	Bob Baldwin	“The Way She Looked at Me”	#3 R&R Smooth Jazz (05/22/2003); #9 Year-End	Artist / Producer / Arranger
2008	Bob Baldwin	“Third Wind”	#23 R&R Smooth Jazz (07/05/2008)	Artist / Producer / Arranger / Co-Writer
2011	Bob Baldwin feat. Darren Rahn	“For Grover and George”	#12 Billboard Smooth Jazz Radio (09/03/2011)	Co-Writer / Arranger
2012	Paul Brown feat. Bob James	“Backstage Pass”	#1 Billboard Smooth Jazz Radio (12/29/2012)	Co-Writer / Arranger
2013	Paul Brown feat. Euge Groove	“From the Ground Up”	#19 Billboard Smooth Jazz Radio (08/10/2013)	Co-Writer / Arranger
2014	Bob Baldwin feat. Gabriel Mark Hasselbach	“Seabreeze”	#5 Billboard Smooth Jazz Radio (03/15/2014)	Artist / Producer / Arranger
2014	Bob Baldwin feat. Ragan Whiteside & Gabriel Mark Hasselbach	“Chameleon 3000”	#8 Billboard Smooth Jazz Radio (07/19/2014)	Artist / Producer / Arranger
2016	Bob Baldwin	“Love’s Light in Flight/Love Trippin’”	#19 Billboard Smooth Jazz Radio (01/09/2016)	Producer / Co-Writer
2017	Gabriel Mark Hasselbach feat. Bob Baldwin	“Charmed Life”	#19 Billboard Smooth Jazz Radio (01/07/2017)	Artist / Producer / Arranger / Co-Writer
2017	Bob Baldwin feat. Gabriel Mark Hasselbach	“Mobile and Global”	#28 Billboard Smooth Jazz Radio (05/27/2017)	Artist / Producer / Arranger / Co-Writer
2017	Ragan Whiteside feat. Kim Waters	“Early Arrival”	#7 Billboard Smooth Jazz Radio (08/19/2017)	Co-Producer / Co-Writer
2018	Ragan Whiteside	“Corey’s Bop”	#1 Billboard Smooth Jazz Radio (07/21/2018)	Co-Producer / Co-Writer / Keyboardist
2018	Bob Baldwin feat. Marcus Anderson	“Be Blessed (No Stress)”	#6 Billboard Smooth Jazz Radio (07/21/2018)	Artist / Producer / Arranger / Co-Writer
2018	Ragan Whiteside feat. Chieli Minucci	“Off Kilter”	#18 Billboard Smooth Jazz Radio	Performer / Co-Producer
2018	Ragan Whiteside feat. Bob Baldwin	“Remind Me” feat. Patrice Rushen	#21 Billboard Smooth Jazz Radio	Performer / Co-Producer
2019	Ragan Whiteside feat. Bob Baldwin & The PR Experience	“See You at the Getdown”	#2 Billboard Smooth Jazz Radio (02/22/2019)	Performer / Co-Producer
2019	Ragan Whiteside	“Jam It”	#2 Billboard Smooth Jazz Radio	Performer / Co-Composer / Co-Producer
2019	Ragan Whiteside	“JJ’s Strut”	#3 Billboard Smooth Jazz Radio (10/17/2020)*	Performer / Co-Composer / Co-Producer
2020	Ragan Whiteside	“Reminiscing”	#2 Billboard Smooth Jazz Radio (04/04/2020)	Performer / Co-Composer / Co-Producer
2021	Ragan Whiteside	“Off the Cuff”	#9 Billboard Smooth Jazz Radio (09/17/2021)	Performer / Co-Composer / Co-Producer
2022	Ragan Whiteside	“Thrill Ride”	#1 Billboard Smooth Jazz Radio (08/21/2022)	Performer / Co-Composer / Co-Producer
2023	Ragan Whiteside	“Full Court Press”	#10 Billboard Smooth Jazz Radio (06/09/2023)	Performer / Co-Composer / Co-Producer
2026	Bob Baldwin	“HEPnotic (Hep Is the New Hip/100 Years of Cool)”	#1 Billboard Smooth Jazz Radio (08/08/2026)	Performer / Composer / Producer / Arranger
2026	Ragan Whiteside	“In Love (Reimagined)”	#1 Billboard Smooth Jazz Radio (09/14/2026)	Performer / Composer / Producer / Arranger

== Partial Top 30 Albums (As Record Producer, Arranger and/or Composer) ==
Full discography at ALLMUSIC

Year	Artist	Album	Chart activity	Contribution
1991	Will Downing	A Dream Fulfilled	#22 Billboard Top R&B Albums (11/02/1991)	Composer: “She”
1992	Grover Washington, Jr.	Next Exit	#1 Billboard Contemporary Jazz Albums	Performer / Composer / Producer / Arranger: “Till You Return to Me”
1992	Marion Meadows	Keep It Right There	#15 Billboard Year-End Contemporary Jazz Albums	Performer / Composer / Producer / Arranger: “Wishing”; “Come Back to Me”
1992	Whistle	Get the Love	#75 Billboard Top R&B Albums	Bass / Piano / Synth / Composer: “Get the Love”
1993	Will Downing	Love’s the Place to Be	#24 Billboard Top R&B Albums; #64 Billboard Year-End R&B Albums	Performer / Composer / Producer: “Hey Girl”; “Break Up to Make Up”; “Sailing on a Dream”
1995	Marion Meadows	Body Rhythm	#12 Billboard Contemporary Jazz Albums (08/12/1995)	Performer / Composer / Producer / Arranger: “South Beach”; “Marion’s Theme”; “Wanna Be Loved By You”; “Wishing”; “Kool”; “Summer’s Over”
1999	Blaque	Blaque	#53 Billboard 200; RIAA Platinum (04/10/2000)	Bass / Piano / Synth: “Right Next to Me”
2000	Will Downing	All the Man You Need	#25 Billboard Top R&B/Hip-Hop Albums; #100 Billboard 200 - Grammy Nominated (Best Traditional R&B Album)	Performer / Composer / Arranger: “All the Man You Need”; “Love of My Life”
2002	Marion Meadows	In Deep	#17 Billboard Contemporary Jazz Albums (08/17/2002)	Performer / Composer / Producer: “Don’t Wanna Be the Last to Know”
2012	Paul Brown	The Funky Joint	#2 Billboard Contemporary Jazz Albums (03/24/2012)	Performer / Composer: “Backstage Pass” (feat. Bob James); “From the Ground Up” (feat. Euge Groove)
2014	Paul Brown	Truth B Told	#2 Billboard Contemporary Jazz Albums (08/16/2014)	Performer / Composer: “Home Sweet Home”
2014	Richard Elliot	Lip Service	#1 Billboard Contemporary Jazz Albums (08/16/2014)	Performer / Composer: “City Lights”
