= Harry Bailey (footballer) =

English footballer and cricketer

Personal information
- Full name: William Henry Bailey
- Date of birth: 2 October 1870
- Place of birth: Melton Mowbray, Leicestershire, England
- Date of death: 19 October 1930 (aged 60)
- Place of death: Melton Mowbray, Leicestershire, England
- Position: Left back

Senior career*
Years	Team	Apps	(Gls)
- Melton Rovers
- Melton Town
- Birmingham St. Georges
- Melton Rovers
1884–1899	Leicester Fosse	108	(0)
- * Club domestic league appearances and goals

William Bailey
Personal information
- Full name: William Henry Bailey
- Born: 2 October 1870; Melton Mowbray, Leicestershire, England
- Died: 19 October 1930 (aged 60); Melton Mowbray
- Batting: Right-handed

Domestic team information
- Years: Team
- 1896: Leicestershire

Career statistics
Competition	First-class
Matches	2
Runs scored	49
Batting average	12.25
100s/50s	–/–
Top score	15
Balls bowled	–
Wickets	–
Bowling average	–
5 wickets in innings	–
10 wickets in match	–
Best bowling	–
Catches/stumpings	1/–
- Source: Cricinfo

William Henry Bailey (2 October 1870 – 19 October 1930) was an English cricketer, batting right-handed, an association football left back, and latterly a pub landlord. He was born at Melton Mowbray, Leicestershire, and has been dubbed "one of Victorian Leicester's sporting super stars"

== Football ==
Bailey was a professional footballer who played for Leicester Fosse as a full-back. He played in the club's first ever games in both the Midlands' League and the Football League, he was the first player to reach 100 appearances for the club and also scored the Fosse's first ever penalty.

== Cricket ==
Bailey made two first-class appearances for Leicestershire in the 1896 County Championship against Lancashire at Aigburth, Liverpool, and Derbyshire at Grace Road, Leicester. He scored 49 runs in his two matches, at an average of 12.25, with a high score of 15.

After his sporting career he became a pub landlord, of the Full Moon in Russel Square in Leicester. He died at the place of his birth on 19 October 1930.
