= Joseph T. Dawson =

US Army officer (1914–1998)

Joseph Turner Dawson
- Born: March 20, 1914; Temple, Texas
- Died: November 28, 1998 (aged 84); Corpus Christi, Texas
- Military career
- Allegiance: United States
- Branch: United States Army
- Rank: Lieutenant Colonel
- Unit: 1st Infantry Division
- Commands: G Company, 2nd Battalion, 16th Infantry Regiment
- Conflicts: World War II: North African Campaign; Sicilian Campaign; Western Front
- Awards: Distinguished Service Cross
- Other work: Office of Strategic Services (O.S.S.)

Joseph Turner Dawson (March 20, 1914 – November 28, 1998) was an officer in the U.S. 1st Infantry Division during World War II.

== Early life ==
Joseph Turner Dawson was the third child of Baptist clergyman Joseph Martin Dawson and Willie Turner Dawson and was born in Temple, Texas. His father, Joseph Martin Dawson, was the minister of the First Baptist Church in Waco, Texas. Dawson graduated from Baylor University in 1933 and pursued a career as a geologist, first with Humble Oil and Refining in Houston and then, beginning in 1938, with the Ren-War Oil Corporation in Corpus Christi, Texas.

== Military career ==
Dawson enlisted in the Army in May 1941 as a private, and was rapidly promoted to corporal. He applied for admission to officer candidate school (OCS), and his application was accepted and he entered OCS at Fort Benning, Georgia, in December, 1941. He graduated in March, 1942 and received his commission as a second lieutenant. He sought to be assigned to the 1st Infantry Division, the fabled Big Red One, since that assignment offered the most immediate prospect for combat duty. He was initially assigned to the 1st platoon, A Company, 16th Infantry Regiment. After Maj. Gen. Terry de la Mesa Allen Sr. assumed command of the 1st Division, Dawson was assigned to serve on his staff.

The 1st Division shipped out to Scotland in August, 1942. After further training, the division embarked in late October for its destination, the invasion of North Africa on the coast of Algeria. Dawson waded ashore at Oran with Gen. Allen and his staff on November 10. The division fought across Algeria and entered Tunisia in January, 1943, where it first encountered German forces under Field Marshal Erwin Rommel. Dawson remained on Gen. Allen's staff through the conclusion of the North African campaign in Algeria and Tunisia, and was promoted to captain in February, 1943. The Germans surrendered in Tunisia in May.

The 1st Division returned to Oran to prepare for the invasion of Sicily, which began with amphibious landings at Gela on the west coast on July 10. During the campaign in Sicily later in July, Dawson was transferred from Gen. Allen's staff to the staff of the 16th Infantry, serving as regimental operations officer (S-3). In early August, in the midst of fierce combat operations, Dawson was assigned to command Company G of the 16th Infantry, a position he would continue to hold until the conclusion of the battle of Aachen, Germany, in October, 1944. After completing the defeat of German forces in Sicily in August, the 1st Division was then evacuated to England for training in preparation for the Normandy invasion.

Dawson landed with his company at the Easy Red sector of Omaha Beach early in the morning on June 6, 1944. After being pinned down on the beach, Dawson led his men up a narrow ravine, now known as "Dawson's draw," from the beach to the top of the bluff on which the American cemetery now sits. He personally cleared a German machine gun nest with an accurate throw of a grenade. He is known as one of the first officers to reach the top of the bluff overlooking the beach. Once at the top, he led his men to his objective at Colleville-sur-Mer, where he was wounded on the afternoon of June 6. For his actions that day he was awarded the Distinguished Service Cross, and at the 50th anniversary of the D-Day landings, Dawson was selected by the Army to speak at the ceremonies as the representative of the troops who landed that day.

After recuperating from his wounds, Dawson rejoined his unit in France, and after the break-out at St. Lo, he led his company in the advance across France and into Belgium, engaging in a number of actions against the Germans. From Belgium, the 1st Division was engaged in the battle at Aachen, Germany in September and October 1944. Dawson's G Company (along with I Company) held off German counterattacks for thirty-nine days during the battle for Aachen, what was called in contemporary papers and is still called in U.S. Army history, "Dawson's Ridge." This ridge sat astride the main route that for the German attempts to relieve the city of Aachen, which Hitler had ordered to be defended at all costs. G Company lost 117 out of 139 men during the battle for "Dawson's Ridge." For this action, Dawson's command was honored with the Presidential Unit Citation.

Dawson was hospitalized after the lengthy action at Aachen, capping his extended combat experience in North Africa, Sicily, and France spanning nearly two years. After recuperation at hospitals in France and the U.S., Dawson was promoted to major and was reassigned to the OSS under the command of Maj. Gen. William J. Donovan, serving for the remainder of the U.S. action in Europe during 1945 until the German surrender.

Dawson was promoted to lieutenant colonel, and after leaving active duty in the Army in 1945 he served for a number of years in the Army reserves. He returned to Corpus Christi, where he continued his career as a geologist, working to develop oil and gas reserves in that region until just before his death.

== Later life ==
Dawson married Melba Bruno in 1946. They raised two children, Roslyn and Diane. The Dawson family lived in Corpus Christi, Texas, and in Denver, Colorado. In civilian life he was a geologist in the oil industry. An elementary school in Corpus Christi, Texas is named in his honor.

In June 1994, Dawson revisited Normandy to introduce President Bill Clinton at ceremonies marking the 50th anniversary of the invasion.
