= James Baillie =

James Baillie may refer to:

- James Baillie (Canadian politician) (1860–1935), former mayor of Aylmer, Quebec
- James Baillie (merchant) (c. 1737–1793), merchant and MP for Horsham
- James Evan Baillie (1781–1863), British West Indies merchant, landowner and Whig politician
- James Black Baillie (1872–1940), British moral philosopher and Vice-Chancellor of the University of Leeds
- James E. B. Baillie (1859–1931), Unionist MP for Inverness-shire
- James Baillie (footballer) (born 1996), English footballer
- Sir James Baillie, 2nd Baronet of the Baillie baronets

== See also ==
- James Bailie (1890–1967), Northern Irish unionist politician
- James Bailey (disambiguation)
- James Bayley (disambiguation)
