= William Langlais =

Canadian gridiron football player (born 1990)

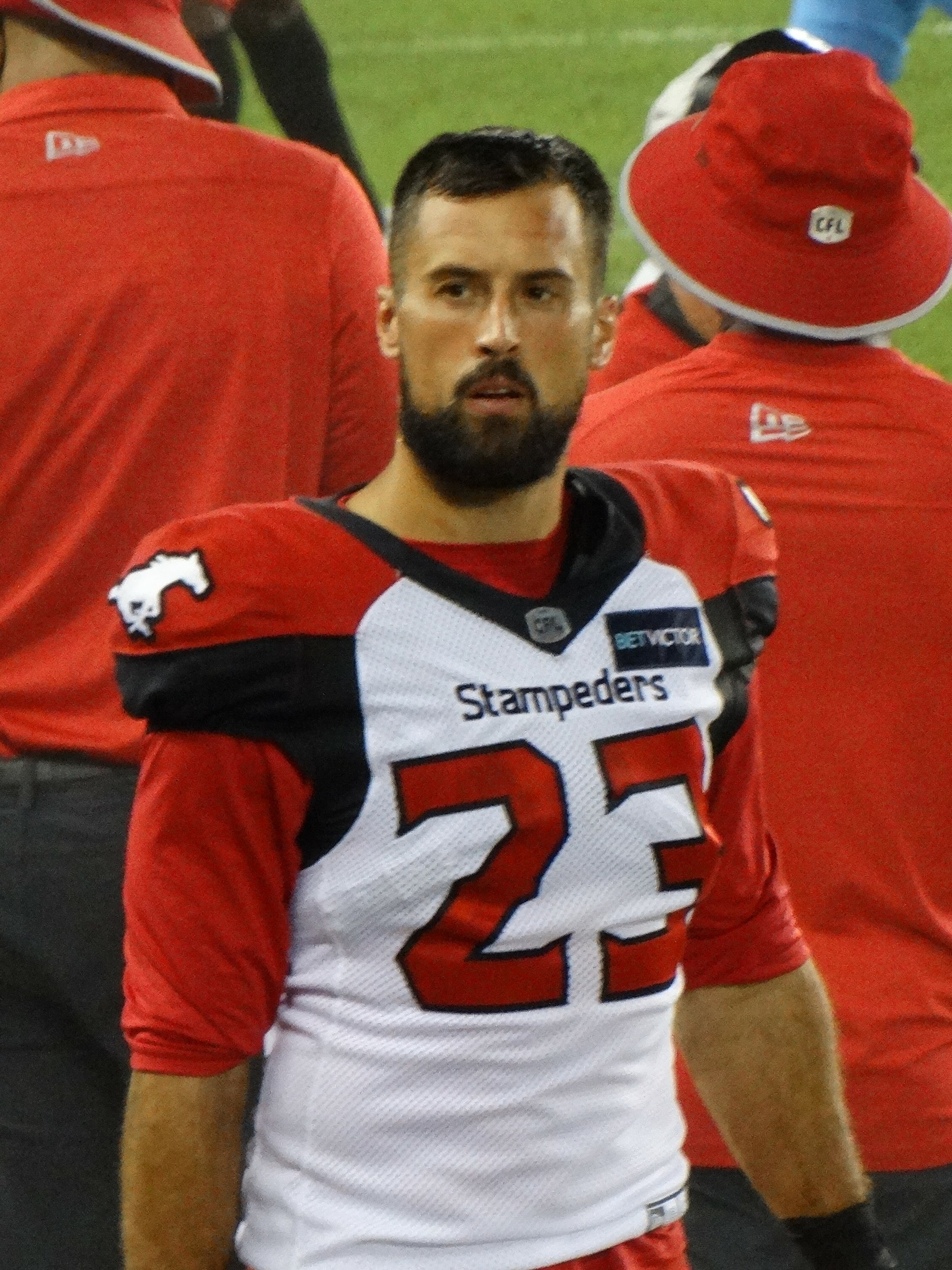
- Langlais with the Calgary Stampeders in 2022

Profile
- Position: Fullback

Personal information
- Born: April 23, 1990 (age 36); Hull, Quebec, Canada
- Listed height: 6 ft 3 in (1.91 m)
- Listed weight: 235 lb (107 kg)

Career information
- High school: Mont-Bleu Secondary School
- CEGEP: Cégep Beauce-Appalaches
- University: Sherbrooke
- CFL draft: 2015: 3rd round, 27th overall pick

Career history
- 2015–2025: Calgary Stampeders

Awards and highlights
- Grey Cup champion (2018)
- Stats at CFL.ca

William Langlais (born April 23, 1990) is a Canadian former professional football fullback. He played for ten seasons for the Calgary Stampeders of the Canadian Football League (CFL) and won a Grey Cup championship in 2018.

== Amateur career ==
Langlais played high school football at École secondaire Mont-Bleu for Les Panthères. He first played college football at Cégep Beauce-Appalaches as a linebacker from 2009 to 2011 before transferring to the Université de Sherbrooke. While playing for the Sherbrooke Vert et Or, he played as a linebacker in 2012 and a defensive end in 2013, before moving to the offensive side as a running back in his final year. During his only year as a running back at the collegiate level, Langlais rushed only four times for 14 yards, adding five catches for 44 yards.

== Professional career ==
Despite relatively unimpressive statistics in his single year as a running back at Sherbrooke, Langlais attracted the attention of scouts after performing well at the regional CFL Combine in Montreal and the national CFL combine in Toronto, including recording the fastest shuttle time of 4.08 seconds and a 40-yard time of 4.71 seconds in Montreal. He was selected by the Calgary Stampeders in the third round of the 2015 CFL draft with the 27th overall pick, and was signed by Calgary on May 28, 2015. He made the active roster following the preseason, and debuted in the Stampeders' first week game against the Hamilton Tiger-Cats. Langlais played in 17 regular season games for the Stampeders in this rookie season where he had 11 special teams tackles.

In 2016, Langlais appeared in 16 games for the Stampeders, where he had one punt return for 0 yards and 17 special teams tackles. In 2017, he recorded the first reception of his career against in a Week 6 game against the Hamilton Tiger-Cats. In a later game against the Tiger-Cats, on October 13, 2017, Langlais recovered a fumble following a blocked punt and returned the ball for his first professional touchdown. He appeared in all 18 games for the first time in his career and finished the season with three catches for 30 yards, a kickoff return for 21 yards, and 16 special teams tackles.

The 2018 season was Langlais' best season offensively, with him appearing in 16 regular season games and recording six catches for 105 yards in addition to nine special teams tackles. He also played in both post-season games, including the 106th Grey Cup championship win over the Ottawa Redblacks, which was the first Grey Cup win of his career.

In 2019 season, he was limited to just nine regular season games, but still caught four passes for 54 yards and had one carry for three yards. He did not play in 2020 due to the cancellation of the 2020 CFL season. Langlais re-signed with the Stampeders on December 21, 2020.

In a pandemic-shortened 2021 season, Langlais played in 12 regular season games and had one catch for five yards and four special teams tackles.

Langlais announced his retirement on February 18, 2026, having played in 132 regular season games where he recorded 25 receptions for 305 yards and two touchdowns and one carry for three yards. He had 10 kickoff returns for 162 yards, 60 special teams tackles, one punt for 50 yards, and a touchdown return from a blocked punt.
