= James Bayley =

James Bayley may refer to:

- James Roosevelt Bayley (1814–1877), first Bishop of Newark, New Jersey
- James Bayley (cricketer), English cricketer
- James Bayley (politician) (1882–1968), Australian politician
- James Bayley (tennis) (1899–1981), Australian tennis player

== See also ==
- James Bailey (disambiguation)
- James Baillie (disambiguation)
- James Bailie (1890–1967), Northern Irish unionist politician
