= William Mulligan =

William Mulligan may refer to:

- William Hughes Mulligan, American judge
- William J. Mulligan, Deputy Supreme Knight of the Knights of Columbus
- William George Mulligan, farmer, merchant and politician in Quebec
