= Centre de services scolaire des Portages-de-l'Outaouais =

School service centre in Outaouais, Quebec, Canada

Centre de services scolaire des portages-de-l'Outaouais

Address
- 225, rue Saint-Rédempteur Gatineau, Quebec, J8X 2T3; Canada

District information
- Chair of the board: Mario Crevier (President)
- Schools: 21 elementary schools; 4 high schools
- Budget: CA$110 million million (2004-2005)

Students and staff
- Students: 14,000

Other information
- Website: www.csspo.gouv.qc.ca

The Centre de services scolaire des Portages-de-l'Outaouais (CSSPO) is one of 4 public school service centres operating in the Outaouais, Quebec.

The CSSPO was created after the former Commission Scolaire des Portages-de-l'Outaouais was abolished in 2020.

It currently runs schools in the Hull and Aylmer sectors of the city of Gatineau as well as in the municipalities of Chelsea, Luskville and La Pêche. Its current president is Mario Crevier. The current general manager is Jean-Claude Bouchard.

The centre runs 21 primary schools and 4 high schools including école secondaire Grande-Rivière, école secondaire de l'Île and école secondaire Mont-Bleu. It also runs the école secondaire des Lacs in the municipality of La Pëche (Sainte-Cécile-de-Masham). Overall, schools in the CSSPO area have a total of about 14 000 students in all levels.

Its motto is "Ensemble vers la réussite!" ("Together towards success").

The centre had a foundation called "La Fondation CSPO" in which it accumulated proceeds from the general population in its jurisdictional territory in order to realize various projects across the territory, such as leisure or general activities, parent and student assistance, bursary or infrastructure upgrades.

== Primary schools ==
- École de l'Amérique-Française
- École au Coeur-des-Collines (La Pêche/Sainte-Cécile-de-Masham)
- École Côte-du-Nord
- École de la Vallée-des-Voyageurs (Pontiac)
- École des Rapides-Deschênes
- École des Trois-Portages
- École du Dôme
- École primaire Grand Boisé (Chelsea)
- École du Mont Bleu
- École du Plateau
- École des Deux-Ruisseaux
- École du Vieux-Verger
- École du Village
- École Euclide-Lanthier
- École Jean-de-Brébeuf
- École du Lac-des-Fées
- École Notre-Dame
- École du Parc-de-la-Montagne
- École Saint-Jean-Bosco
- École Saint-Paul
- École Saint-Rédempteur
- École du Marais

== Secondary schools ==
- École secondaire de l'île
- École secondaire Mont-Bleu
- École secondaire Grande-Rivière
- École secondaire des Lacs
- École de la Nouvelle-Ère
- École secondaire de la Cité
