= Joseph-Ignace Aumond =

Joseph-Ignace Aumond (March 21, 1810 – November 9, 1879) was a lumber merchant in Ontario, Canada. He was considered a prominent Canadian timber baron of his time.

The son of Ignace Aumon and Euphrosine Robichaud, he was born in L'Assomption, Lower Canada and went to work as a store clerk in Montreal after completing his schooling. He came to Bytown to operate a store for his employer and later opened his own general store there. Around 1830, Aumond began operating in the timber business in the Ottawa Valley. He held timber cutting rights along the Madawaska, Petawawa and Gatineau Rivers. During the late 1840s, Aumond built one of the largest steam-powered sawmills in Canada at the time. He later suffered a major financial setback but continued on in the timber trade at a reduced level.

In 1833, Aumond married Jane Gumming. They had eight children.

Aumond was president of the Bytown and Montreal Telegraph Company. He helped establish the Bytown and Prescott Railway and served as one of its first directors. He was a partner with John Egan in the operation of two steamships on the Ottawa River and also partnered with Egan and Ruggles Wright in constructing a horse-drawn railway to provide an overland connection around rapids to link the two steamship routes. He was also a director with Robert Conroy and Richard McConnell of the Bytown and Aylmer Union Turnpike Company which completed the road linking Bytown and Aylmer in 1850; Egan was company president.

He helped organize the first fire company in Bytown in 1838, also serving on the first school board and on the Board of Health for the town. He was also a prominent member of the Ottawa Association of Lumber Manufacturers. In 1874, he ran unsuccessfully as a Conservative for the Ottawa City seat in the House of Commons of Canada. Aumond served in the Carleton County militia, reaching the rank of colonel.

He died in Ottawa at the age of 69.

The township of Aumond, Quebec was named in his honour.
