= Kevin Zabo =

Canadian basketball player

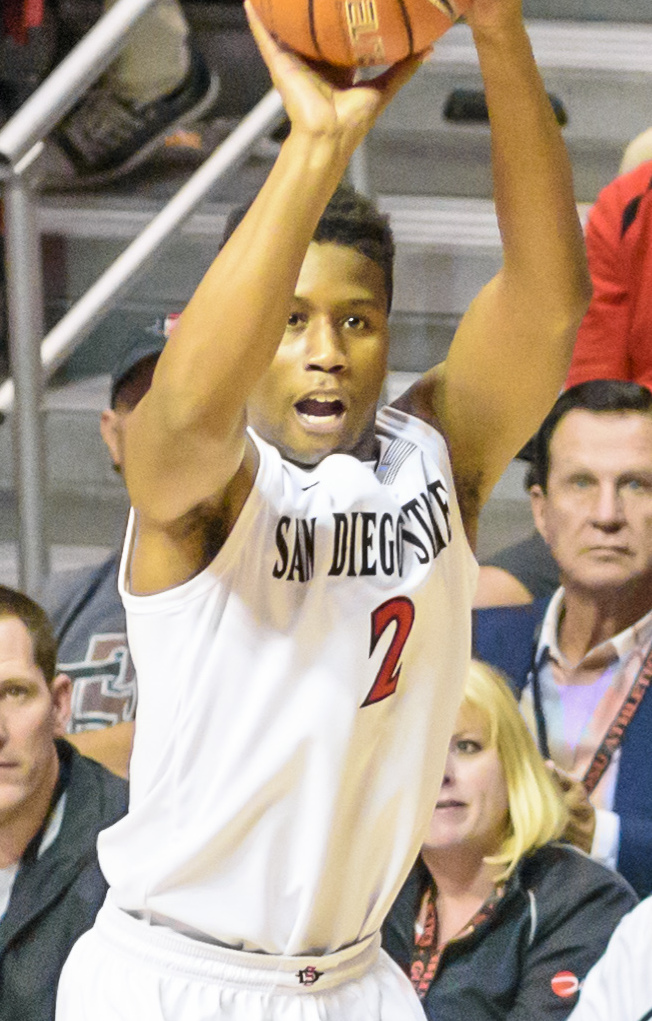
- Zabo with San Diego State in 2014

Canisius Golden Griffins
- Position: Assistant coach
- League: Metro Atlantic Athletic Conference

Personal information
- Born: May 12, 1995 (age 31) Sherbrooke, Quebec, Canada
- Listed height: 6 ft 3 in (1.91 m)
- Listed weight: 190 lb (86 kg)

Career information
- High school: St. Mark's School (Southborough, Massachusetts); Montrose Christian School (Rockville, Maryland); Brewster Academy (Wolfeboro, New Hampshire)
- College: San Diego State (2014–2015); Indian Hills CC (2015–2016); Kent State (2016–2018)
- NBA draft: 2018: undrafted
- Playing career: 2018–2020
- Coaching career: 2020–present

Career history

Playing
- 2018: St. John's Edge
- 2018–2019: Albacete Basket
- 2019–2020: CB Ciudad de Ponferrada

Coaching
- 2020–2021: Kent State (GA)
- 2021–2022: Kent State (DBO)
- 2022–2023: Jacksonville (DPD)
- 2023–2024: Fairleigh Dickinson (assistant)
- 2024–present: Canisius (assistant)
Medals
Men's basketball
Representing Canada
FIBA Americas U16 Championship
Bronze medal – third place	2011 Mexico	National team

Kevin-Mbeleza Zabo (born May 12, 1995) is a Canadian basketball coach and former player who is currently an assistant coach at Canisius University. He completed his college basketball career with Kent State.

== Early life ==
Zabo was born in Sherbrooke, Quebec to Congolese father Ndavo Zeph Zabo and Rwandan mother Jackie Mukamayire. His parents and older brother Alexandre had settled in Canada in the 1990s to escape a brewing war in central Africa. At age 4, Zabo moved to Gatineau, Quebec, and at age 5, he began playing basketball against older opponents in a YMCA league. He played for De L'Île High School by 7th grade and was also a member of Amateur Athletic Union (AAU) team QC United.

== High school career ==
When he was 15 years old, Zabo moved to the United States for high school. He first attended St. Mark's School in Southborough, Massachusetts, where he was teammates with college prospects Nik Stauskas, Alex Murphy, and Kaleb Tarczewski. With St. Mark's, Zabo was ranked among the top guards in his class by ESPN. However, he decided to transfer due to the school's requirement of playing multiple sports, which forced him to play football.

As a sophomore, he attended Montrose Christian School in Rockville, Maryland but left after one year over housing concerns.

Zabo completed his high school career at Brewster Academy in Wolfeboro, New Hampshire, where he joined several NCAA Division I recruits, including Devonte' Graham and Chris McCullough. In the 2013–14 season, he helped his team finish with a 33–2 record and win the National Prep Championship and New England Preparatory School Athletic Council Class AAA title. Zabo was rated a three-star recruit by recruiting service 247Sports and ESPN.

He played with CIA Bounce on the AAU circuit, a team that featured Anthony Bennett and Andrew Wiggins, who would both become first overall NBA draft picks.

== College career ==
=== San Diego State ===
As a freshman, Zabo joined a San Diego State team that was coming off a 31–5 season. He was logging productive minutes during the non-conference season, but after spraining his pinky toe, Zabo had trouble finding his spot in the rotation. He opted to transfer following the season.

=== Indian Hills Community College ===
Zabo played a season at Indian Hills Community College, averaging seven points per game and attracting the attention of Division I coaches. He narrowed down his choices to Wichita State, Memphis and Iona. However, Wichita State ran out of scholarships, Memphis lost its coaching staff and Iona signed another point guard.

=== Kent State ===
Kent State head coach Rob Senderoff had seen Zabo play at Indian Hills while recruiting his teammate Jerrelle DeBerry, and the Golden Flashes were losing starting point guard Kellon Thomas to transfer, so Senderoff offered Zabo a scholarship.

He committed to Kent State, and helped lead the team to the 2017 NCAA Tournament as a junior. He posted 5.6 points per game on the season. On January 12, 2018, Zabo scored a career-high 24 points and hit four three-pointers in a 70–69 win over Ohio. The following game, Zabo scored 23 points in a 73–71 win over Western Michigan. As a senior at Kent State, Zabo averaged 13 points, 3.2 rebounds, 2.4 assists per game and shot 42.1% from the field.

== Professional career ==
After completing his collegiate eligibility, Zabo participated in the inaugural Dos Equis 3X3U National Championship.

=== St. John's Edge (2018) ===
On August 2, 2018, Zabo signed a one-year deal with the St. John's Edge of the NBL Canada.

=== Albacete Basket (2018–2019) ===
On January 14, 2019, Zabo signed for the remainder of the season with the Albacete Basket of the LEB Plata.

=== CB Ciudad de Ponferrada (2019–present) ===
On August 12, 2019, Zabo signed a one-year deal with the CB Ciudad de Ponferrada of the LEB Plata.

== Coaching career ==
In 2024, Zabo was hired as an assistant coach at Canisius University. He had spent the previous few seasons since the conclusion of his playing career as an assistant for multiple other collegiate programs.
