= Olivier Hanlan =

Canadian basketball player (born 1993)

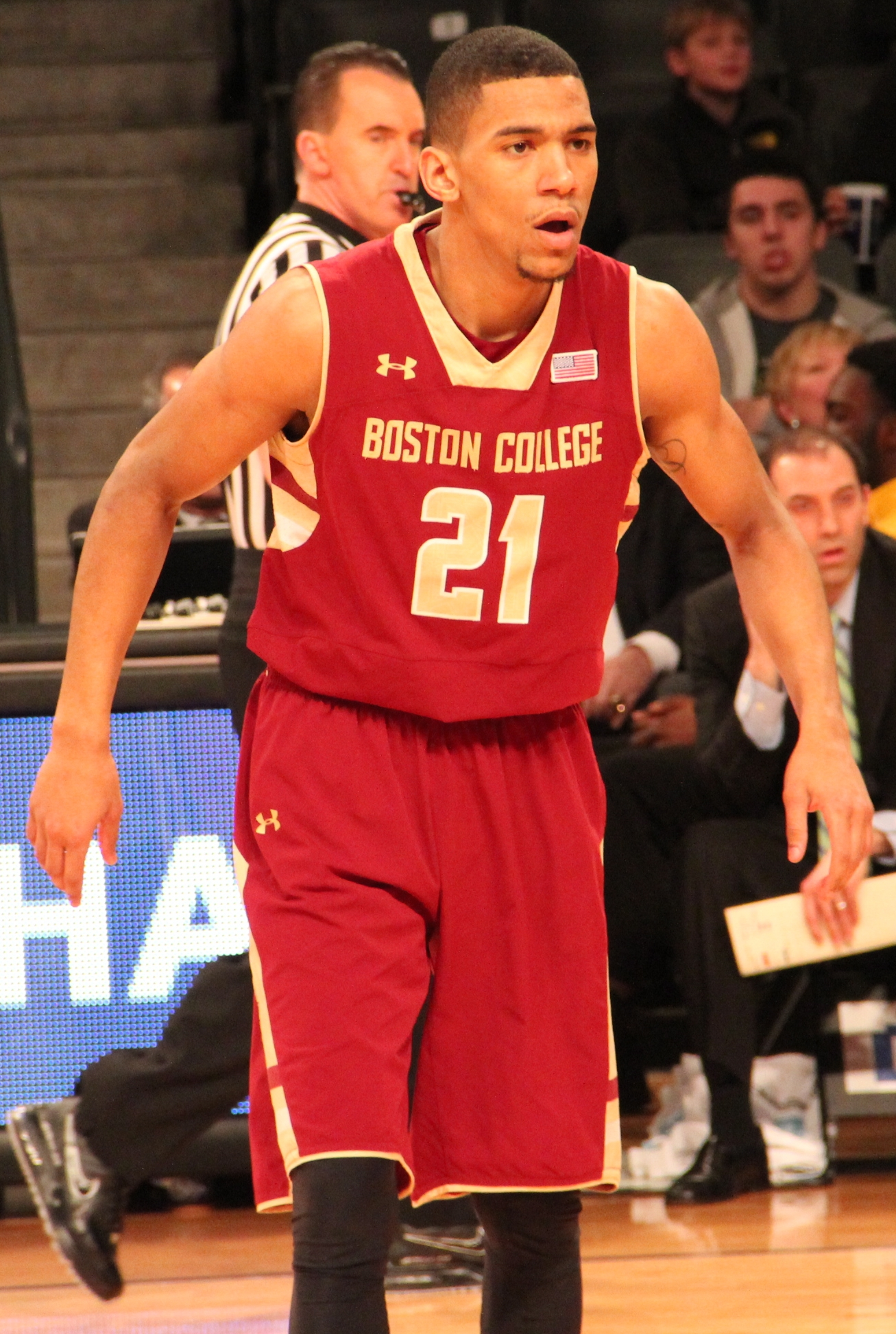
- Hanlan at Boston College in 2014

No. 21 – Petkim Spor
- Position: Point guard / shooting guard
- League: Basketbol Süper Ligi

Personal information
- Born: February 15, 1993 (age 33) Aylmer, Quebec, Canada
- Listed height: 6 ft 4 in (1.93 m)
- Listed weight: 190 lb (86 kg)

Career information
- High school: Grande Rivière (Aylmer, Quebec); New Hampton School (New Hampton, New Hampshire)
- College: Boston College (2012–2015)
- NBA draft: 2015: 2nd round, 42nd overall pick
- Drafted by: Utah Jazz
- Playing career: 2015–present

Career history
- 2015–2016: Žalgiris Kaunas
- 2016–2017: Le Mans
- 2017–2018: Austin Spurs
- 2018–2019: Telekom Bonn
- 2019–2021: Iraklis Thessaloniki
- 2020: Ottawa BlackJacks
- 2021–2022: Aris Thessaloniki
- 2022: Valencia
- 2022: Tianjin Pioneers
- 2022–2023: Gaziantep Basketbol
- 2023–2024: Openjobmetis Varese
- 2024: CSKA Moscow
- 2024–2025: Türk Telekom
- 2025–2026: Spartak Subotica
- 2026–present: Petkim Spor

Career highlights
- VTB United League champion (2024); FIBA Europe Cup assists leader (2024); LKL champion (2016); Serbian League champion (2026); NBA G League champion (2018); Greek League All Star (2020); AP honorable mention All-American (2015); First-team All-ACC (2015); Third-team All-ACC (2014); ACC Rookie of the Year (2013)
- Stats at Basketball Reference
Medals
Men's basketball
Representing Canada
FIBA World U17 Cup
Bronze medal – third place	2010 Hamburg	Under-17

Olivier Zacharie Hanlan (born February 15, 1993) is a Canadian professional basketball player for Petkim Spor of the Basketbol Süper Ligi (BSL). He played college basketball for the Boston College Eagles of the NCAA and was the first player for Boston College since Troy Bell to win conference rookie of the year honors.

== High school career ==
Hanlan attended New Hampton School in New Hampshire for his junior and senior years. He earned first team All-NEPSAC AAA team honors as a senior.

=== College recruitment ===
College recruiting
Name	Hometown	School	Height	Weight	Commit date
Olivier Hanlan; PG	Aylmer, Quebec	New Hampton School	6 ft 3 in (1.91 m)	185 lb (84 kg)	Oct 25, 2011
Olivier Hanlan; PG	Recruit ratings: Scout: Rivals: ESPN:				

Hanlan also got offers from Dayton, Iowa, Northeastern, Notre Dame, Rice, TCU, Virginia, and Virginia Tech.

== College career ==
=== Freshman season (2012–2013) ===
As a freshman, Hanlan started all 33 games. He arrived with most of the players being either freshman or sophomores. During Hanlan's freshman season, he scored an average of 15.4 points per game and led his team to the quarterfinals in the 2013 ACC Men's Basketball Tournament. Hanlan's first breakout game was on November 21, 2012, against Auburn when he had 19 points and made the game-winning shot in a 50–49 victory for the Eagles. After that game, Hanlan was very consistent, including scoring 17 points versus Miami, 22 versus UNC, and 20 versus Duke. However, he did miss a free throw that would have sent the game against Miami into overtime, and missed a shot that would have won the game against Duke. From mid-February until the end of the season, Hanlan scored at least 12 points every game. His second breakout game was on February 19, 2013, versus Maryland, when he scored a career high 26 points in a 69–58 win for the Eagles. Hanlan then set the ACC freshman single-game scoring record with 41 points against Georgia Tech on March 14, 2013, in the first round of the conference tournament. The Eagles won 84–64. Hanlan went on to win ACC rookie of the year.

=== Stats ===
College	Year	GP	MIN	SPG	BPG	RPG	APG	PPG	FG%	FT%	3P%
Boston College	2012–13	33	34.2	1.2	0.1	4.2	2.3	15.4	.457	.750	.394

== Professional career ==
=== NBA draft ===
On June 25, 2015, Hanlan was selected with the 42nd overall pick in the 2015 NBA draft by the Utah Jazz. He later joined the Jazz for the 2015 NBA Summer League where he averaged 4.1 points and 2.6 rebounds in eight games.

=== Žalgiris Kaunas (2015—2016) ===
On August 8, 2015, Hanlan signed a one-year deal (with the option of a second) with Lithuanian powerhouse, Žalgiris Kaunas.

=== Le Mans Sarthe Basket (2016—2017) ===
However, on August 2, 2016, Hanlan joined Le Mans Sarthe Basket of the LNB Pro A.

=== Austin Spurs (2017—2018) ===
On November 2, 2017, Hanlan was included in the 2017–18 opening night roster for Austin Spurs.

On September 21, 2018, Hanlan signed with San Antonio Spurs, who had acquired his draft rights from the Utah Jazz for Boris Diaw and a 2022 2nd-round draft pick on July 5, 2016. However, he was waived only a few days later, even before the start of training camp.

=== Telekom Baskets Bonn (2018–2019) ===
On November 27, 2018, Telekom Baskets Bonn of the Basketball Bundesliga announced their signing of Hanlan.

=== Ottawa Blackjacks (2020) ===
On July 16, 2020, the Ottawa Blackjacks of the Canadian Elite Basketball League announced the signing of Hanlan for the upcoming two-week-long CEBL summer series. In eight games, Hanlan averaged 12.5 points, 4.3 rebounds and 2.9 assists per game.

=== Iraklis Thessaloniki (2019–2021) ===
On July 27, 2019, Hanlan signed with newly promoted Iraklis Thessaloniki of the Greek Basket League. After a productive season averaging 16.3 points, 3.5 rebounds, and 3.4 assists per game, Hanlan extended his contract with the Greek club for one more year on July 29, 2020. In his second season, he was named as one of the three team captains, along with Dimitrios Verginis and Vassilis Kavvadas. Overall, Hanlan averaged 13.4 points (shooting 34.6% from beyond the arc and 39.2% from the field), as well as 2.8 assists, playing 29 minutes per contest.

=== Aris Thessaloniki (2021–2022) ===
On August 7, 2021, Hanlan signed with fellow Greek Basket League club Aris Thessaloniki, where he was named team captain alongside Stavros Schizas. In 15 games, he averaged a career-high of 20.8 points (shooting with 38% from the 3-point line), 3.5 rebounds, 2.9 assists and 0.9 steals, playing around 33 minutes per contest.

=== Valencia (2022) ===
Hanlan's performances with Aris grabbed the attention of many European clubs and on April 5, 2022, he signed with EuroCup contenders Valencia of the Liga ACB, replacing the injured Klemen Prepelič for the rest of the season. In 11 league games, he averaged 7.5 points, 1 rebound and 1.1 assists per contest. On June 9, 2022, Hanlan was released from the Spanish club.

=== Gaziantep Basketbol (2022–2023) ===
On November 8, 2022, he signed with Gaziantep Basketbol of the Basketbol Süper Ligi (BSL).

=== Pallacanestro Varese (2023–2024) ===
On July 28, 2023, he signed with Openjobmetis Varese of the Lega Basket Serie A (LBA).

=== CSKA Moscow (2024) ===
On March 1, 2024, Hanlan signed with CSKA Moscow of the VTB United League.

=== Türk Telekom (2024–2025) ===
On July 3, 2024, he signed with Türk Telekom of the Turkish Basketbol Süper Ligi (BSL).

=== Spartak Subotica (2025–2026) ===
On August 15, 2025, he signed with Spartak Subotica of the Serbian League (KLS).

=== Petkim Spor (2026–present) ===
On September 4, 2026, he signed with Petkim Spor of the Basketbol Süper Ligi (BSL).

=== Stats ===
Team	Year	GP	MIN	SPG	BPG	RPG	APG	PPG	2P%	FT%	3P%	TO
Iraklis Thessaloniki BC	2019–20	20	30.2	0.9	0.05	3.55	3.45	16.3	.574	.806	.318	2.45

== National team career ==
Hanlan was a member of the Canadian Under-17 national team that finished third in the 2010 FIBA Under-17 World Cup in Germany. Hanlan led his team in scoring, in the bronze medal game against Lithuania, with 15 points. He also had 4 assists and 5 rebounds. He was also a member of the Canadian Under-19 national team that competed in Latvia, at the 2011 FIBA Under-19 World Cup.

In August 2017, Hanlan was a member of the Canadian Senior Men's National Team that competed at the 2017 FIBA AmeriCup. Hanlan scored a team-high 10 points, to go along with three rebounds and three assists, in a loss to the U.S. Virgin Islands. Then in November 2017, Hanlan was a member of the Canadian Senior Men's National Team that competed at the 2019 FIBA Basketball World Cup Americas qualifiers.
