= Harvey Parker (politician) =

Harvey Parker, Jr. (December 28, 1814 – January 7, 1892) was a farmer, lumber merchant and politician in Quebec. He served as mayor of Aylmer from 1862 to 1866, the first person born in Aylmer to serve as its mayor.

Parker was the son of Harvey Parker and Azenath Chamberlain, who came to Aylmer from Newbury, Vermont in 1801. He served on Aylmer municipal council from 1849 to 150 and from 1855 to 1858. Parker also served as municipal assessor. During his term as mayor, wooden sidewalks were built in the village. He was a partner with Robert Conroy, Charles Symmes and John Egan in the operation of a steam-powered flour mill.

Parker was married twice: first to Helen Lafurgy, with whom he had five children, and then to Sarah Leggo, who had six more children with Parker.

He died in Aylmer at the age of 78.

His former residence has been designated as a Quebec heritage site.
