= James Bailey =

James Bailey may refer to:

== People ==
=== Academics ===
- James Bailey (classical scholar) (died 1864), English schoolmaster
- J. O. Bailey (1903–1979), professor of literature
- Jay Bailey (James E. Bailey, 1944–2001), American biochemical engineer and pioneer of metabolic engineering
- James R. Bailey, professor at George Washington University

=== Politicians ===
- James Bailey (American politician) (1801–1880), mayor of Houston, Texas
- James E. Bailey (1822–1885), US Senator from Tennessee
- James Bailey (British politician) (1840–1910), British Conservative Party politician, MP 1895–1906

=== Sports ===
- James Bailey (basketball) (born 1957), American basketball player
- James Bailey (darts player) (born 1969), Australian darts player
- James Bailey (rugby union) (born 1983), English rugby player
- James Bailey (footballer) (born 1988), English footballer
- James Bailey (field hockey) (born 1991), English field hockey player

=== Others ===
- James Montgomery Bailey (1841–1894), American journalist
- James Anthony Bailey (1847–1906), co-founder of Ringling Brothers and Barnum and Bailey Circus
- James E. Bailey (Medal of Honor) (fl. 1872–1875), recipient during the Indian Wars
- James R. A. Bailey (1919–2000), founder and editor of Drum magazine
- James Bailey (businessman) (born 1973/4), British businessman, CEO of Waitrose
- James Thomas Bailey, founder of ComedySportz Los Angeles
- James Bailey, veterinary anesthesiologist, on the Animal Planet show Emergency Vets

== Fictional characters ==
- James Bailey (Coronation Street), from British soap opera Coronation Street

== See also ==
- Jim Bailey (disambiguation)
- Jimmy James Bailey (born 1954), Honduran footballer
- James Bayley (disambiguation)
- James Baillie (disambiguation)
- James Bailie (1890–1967), Northern Irish unionist politician
- James Baily (born 1975), British tennis player
