= Robert Conroy (politician) =

Robert Conroy (1811 – April 5, 1868) was an Irish-born business owner and politician in Quebec. He served as mayor of Aylmer from 1858 to 1860 and from 1866 to 1868. He was considered one of the most prosperous hotel operators and lumber barons in the Ottawa Valley during the 1850s.

Born in Magherafelt in County Londonderry, Conroy arrived in the Ottawa region in 1830. In 1834 (some sources say 1838) he built the British Hotel in Aylmer. Conroy partnered with John Egan, Charles Symmes and Harvey Parker in the operation of a steam-powered flour mill. He was also a partner with Egan, Richard McConnell and Joseph-Ignace Aumond in the Bytown and Aylmer Union Turnpike Company which completed the Britannia Road (later known as the Aylmer Road) connecting Bytown, Hull and Aylmer to aid in the transport of lumber. Conroy built a sawmill in the Aylmer area which formed the nucleus for the development of the village of Deschênes, now a neighbourhood in the city of Gatineau. Conroy was one of the prominent timber kings of his era who were consulted by the Canadian government during the development of the Crown Timber Act of 1849, which was the first legislation in Canada regulating the use of forest resources on Crown lands. He was a director of the Ottawa Association of Lumber Manufacturers and held extensive timber cutting rights on the Madawaska River and other parts of Renfrew County, Ontario. Conroy was president of the Madawaska River Improvement Company, formed to build timber slides and other structures to aid in the transport of logs on that river. During the 1850s, he bought the Aylmer Hotel, later the Auberge Symmes, from Charles Symmes. He also operated a general store in Aylmer.

Conroy served as a captain in the militia for Ottawa County and was a prominent member of the local Masons. When the Prince of Wales visited Aylmer in 1860, Conroy was a member of the group that drafted the address of welcome.

He married Mary McConnell in 1837 and, in 1841, they moved into an apartment in the British Hotel, where they lived until 1845 when construction of his first home was completed. Conroy died in office at the age of 56 and his wake was held at the British Hotel.

Some sources say that the assassin of Thomas D'Arcy McGee fled to Aylmer to hide himself among those gathered for Conroy's wake.

His son William later also served as Aylmer mayor and another son Robert Hughes Conroy served as mayor of Hull South.

Conroy's former residence has been designated as a heritage building by Quebec.

Conroy Island, an island in the Ottawa River, was named after Robert Conroy and his family.
