= James Mulligan =

James Mulligan may refer to:

- James Henry Mulligan (1823–1892), Irish-born landowner and politician in Quebec
- James A. Mulligan (1829–1864), Civil War Union officer
- James Venture Mulligan (1837–1907), Australian bushman and prospector
- James Hilary Mulligan (1844–1915), judge, politician and poet from Kentucky
- James H. Mulligan Jr. (1920–1996), American electrical engineer and professor
- Jimmy Mulligan (footballer, born 1974) (born 1974), Irish footballer
- James Mulligan (Australian footballer) (born 1989), Australian footballer
- Jimmy Mulligan (born 1991), American soccer player
