= Bourgeau =

Bourgeau is a surname. Notable people with the surname include:

- Alexandre Bourgeau (1828–1882), Canadian merchant and politician from Quebec
- Eugène Bourgeau (1813–1877), French naturalist
- Michel Bourgeau (born 1960), Canadian football player

== Other ==
- Bourgeau Lake, lake in Banff National Park, Alberta, Canada
- Mount Bourgeau, mountain in Banff National Park, Alberta, Canada
