= Robert Howard Wright =

Canadian politician

Robert Howard Wright (1865 – 1933) was a business owner and politician in Quebec. He served as mayor of Aylmer from 1907 to 1911.

The son of Charles Wright and Lucy Stewart, he purchased the former residence of John Egan in 1909, living there until his death with his wife, Esther J. Lusk, and their daughter Annie and two sons R. Howard and Charles J. He established two companies, a dairy and a large greenhouse flower business, which were both very successful. The greenhouses which covered four acres, were heated with coal which was transported to the site by a private railway line. Wright also raised Holstein cattle and owned two flower shops in Ottawa. He served on the Aylmer municipal council from 1899 to 1900 and was elected to council again in 1914 and 1917. Wright became gravely ill in 1933. In the same year, a severe hail storm destroyed his greenhouses; he died later that year.

His former estate was purchased by the Congregation du St-Redempteur, who built a large stone seminary on the site.
