= Thomas Prentiss =

Thomas Brigham Prentiss (August 29, 1809 – April 26, 1895) was an American-born merchant and politician in Quebec. He was mayor of Aylmer from 1878 to 1879.

He was born in Chelsea, Orange County, Vermont, the son of Robert Prentiss, a blacksmith, and Susanna Wright, and was educated in Jericho, Vermont. Prentiss worked at a linen factory in Jericho and then came to Chelsea, Lower Canada in 1833. There he rented and repaired an old carding mill, which he operated for a time and also taught school. Prentiss then became a general merchant at Chelsea and also was the first postmaster there and served as a magistrate. He married Salome Brigham in 1835. In 1855, he moved to Aylmer, where he also served as magistrate. He later married Hannah Folsom Weymouth after his first wife died in 1837 while giving birth. Prentiss served several terms on Aylmer city council both before and after serving as mayor. He was a founding member of the Aylmer Academy.
