= École secondaire Mont-Bleu =

Ecole Secondaire Mont-Bleu

Location
- 389, boulevard Cité-des-Jeunes; Gatineau, Quebec, J8Z 1W6; Canada
- Coordinates: 45.4618°N 75.771°W

Information
- School type: High school
- Founded: 1976
- School board: Commission Scolaire des Portages-de-l'Outaouais
- Principal: François Bélanger
- Grades: Secondary 1-5
- Language: French
- Website: www.mont-bleu.cspo.qc.ca
- Last updated: September 24, 2018

École Secondaire Mont-Bleu is a French-language public secondary school located in Gatineau, Quebec. It is located on Boulevard Cité des Jeunes in the Hull sector just on the eastern flank of the Gatineau Park, one of the National Capital Region's touristic destination. This school is among several other educational institutions located on Cite des Jeunes along with the CEGEP de l'Outaouais, Heritage College and Asticou Centre. Its facilities opened in 1976 and is run by the Commission Scolaire des Portages-de-l'Outaouais (formerly Commission Scolaire Outaouais-Hull) school board.

Students are mostly coming from the Hull sector of the city with some coming from Chelsea and the Aylmer sector.

There are particular programs called "Voies" in which students can follow a particular formation in preparation for superior courses in college or university. Such programs exist in sport, visual art, music, biology, chemistry and more. The obligatory courses are French, Mathematics, science, ethics, history and sport class.

Transportation is mostly provided by the Société de transport de l'Outaouais which has special schools routes that follows most of the track of the regular routes (such as the 31, 33, 37, 39 and 49).

On September 21, 2018, the school was damaged by a fire after the passing of an EF-3 tornado. The students were moved to the Asticou centre near the school for a temporary establishment. The building officially reopened in September 2023.

== Sports facilities and football team ==
Several significant sporting facilities are located within the school. In addition to its facilities inside the building, there is also an athletic field race track, a soccer field, a large stadium in which several sports can be practiced including football, baseball and soccer as well as Gatineau Park and the Relais Plein Air where there can be several outdoor activities, notably in the winter. There are also sports facilities located in the nearby colleges Heritage and the CEGEP de l'Outaouais.

The high school also has a football team called Les Panthères and there are other sporting teams with the same name at the school.

== YouTube incident ==
In November 2006, the school caught worldwide attention when students filmed with a cellphone, their English teacher disciplining his group after several misconducts from it. The video was later posted in three clips on YouTube using a defamatory title, for a few days before being removed. The students responsible of the video clip were suspended indefinitely.

== Cinema ==
This high school is first in the region to offer a cinema course, where students learn to create a publicity and a movie, receive some drama lessons, know more about careers like stunt man or make up artist for special effects on television and movies, and related topics. In March 2008, 45 students who took this class went to Hollywood, California for a field trip. At the end of the year, all the students have the chance to see their productions on big screen at the Famous Players Theatre and celebrate their skills with the traditional Oscars ceremony.
