= Aumond =

- Township municipality
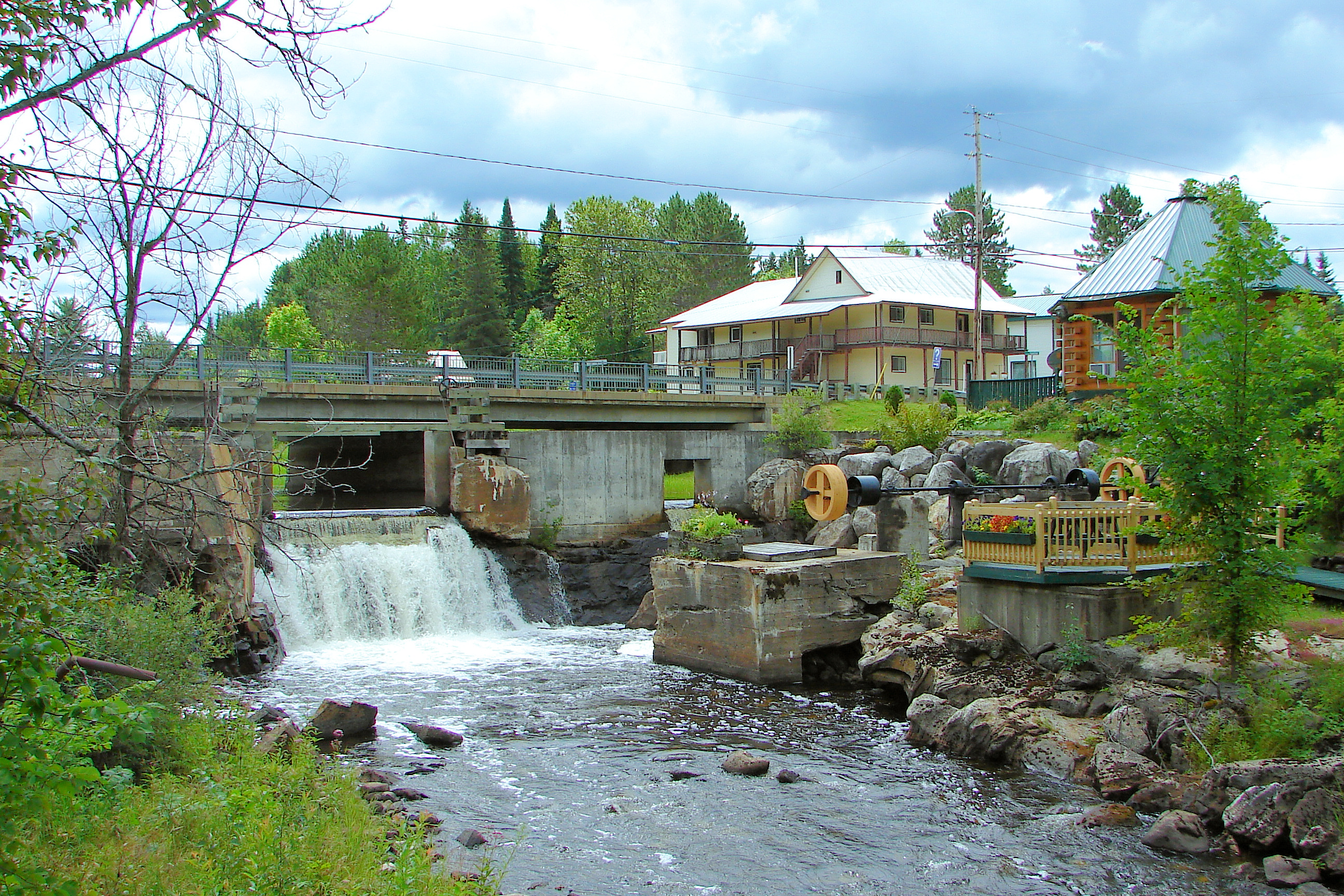

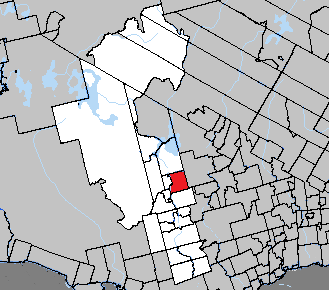
- Location within La Vallée-de-la-Gatineau RCM.

- Location in western Quebec
- Coordinates: 46.47°N 75.89°W
- Country: Canada
- Province: Quebec
- Region: Outaouais
- RCM: La Vallée-de-la-Gatineau
- Constituted: December 12, 1877
- Named after: Joseph-Ignace Aumond

Government
  - Mayor: Mario Langevin
  - Federal riding: Pontiac—Kitigan Zibi
  - Prov. riding: Gatineau

Area
  - Total: 227.62 km^{2} (87.88 sq mi)
  - Land: 212.82 km^{2} (82.17 sq mi)

Population (2021)
  - Total: 754
  - Density: 3.5/km^{2} (9.1/sq mi)
  - Pop (2016–21): 0.0%
  - Dwellings: 623
- Time zone: UTC−5 (EST)
  - Summer (DST): UTC−4 (EDT)
- Postal code(s): J0W 1W0
- Area code: 819
- Website: www.aumond.ca

Aumond is a township municipality in the Canadian province of Quebec, located within La Vallée-de-la-Gatineau Regional County Municipality.

The township is named after Colonel Joseph-Ignace Aumond (1810–1879), a native of l'Assomption, who was one of the major timber merchants of the Ottawa Valley in the nineteenth century. His operations were particularly along the Gatineau, and even went as far as Lake Timiskaming.

== History ==
The history of Aumond dates back to mid-nineteenth century when Joseph-Ignace Aumond began logging in the area. In 1861, the parish of Sainte-Famille d'Aumond and Aumond Township were proclaimed, and in 1877 the township municipality was established. Jos Bertrand, Cyrille Monette, and Édouard Goulet were its first mayors. The first chapel was built in 1870.

In 1862, Oblate priests built the first sawmill on the Joseph River, a tributary of the Gatineau River, in order to saw wood from the rich surrounding forests. A few months later, they built a flour mill adjacent to the first mill. At the outset, these mills were powered by a water wheel which was replaced at the beginning of the twentieth century, by a turbine that, from 1929 onwards, also provided electricity to the villagers. Destroyed by flames, these mills were rebuilt and remained active until 1989.

Today, the municipality of Aumond revives its history by the redevelopment of the Moulin des Pères site in the heart of the village.

== Geography ==
The township is on the eastern shores of the Gatineau River along Route 107. The topography of the township is fairly rough, rising from 203 meters (666 ft) above sea level, near the hamlet of Val-Émard, to 375 meters (1,230 ft). Numerous lakes surround the town, including Lac des Pins, Lac Murray, Lac Saint-Joseph, and Lac Joseph.

Aumond village itself is located on the banks of the Joseph River (French: rivière Joseph) which was also named after Joseph-Ignace Aumond. Other communities within the township are Val-Émard and Saint-Cajétan.

== Demographics ==
Historical census populations – Aumond, Quebec

Year	Pop.	±%
1881	421	—
1891	515	+22.3%
1901	658	+27.8%
1911	617	−6.2%
1921	797	+29.2%
1931	890	+11.7%
1941	944	+6.1%
1951	825	−12.6%
1956	817	−1.0%
1961	704	−13.8%
1966	670	−4.8%

Year	Pop.	±%
1971	605	−9.7%
1976	512	−15.4%
1981	559	+9.2%
1986	575	+2.9%
1991	594	+3.3%
1996	592	−0.3%
2001	640	+8.1%
2006	775	+21.1%
2011	725	−6.5%
2016	754	+4.0%
2021	754	+0.0%

Source: Statistics Canada

In the 2021 Census of Population conducted by Statistics Canada, Aumond had a population of 754 living in 355 of its 623 total private dwellings, a change of 0% from its 2016 population of 754. With a land area of 212.82 km^{2} (82.17 sq mi), it had a population density of 3.5/km^{2} (9.2/sq mi) in 2021.

Mother tongue (2021):

- English as first language: 8%
- French as first language: 90%
- English and French as first language: 2.6%
- Other as first language: 0%

== Government ==
=== Local government ===
List of former mayors:

- Léger Duchesne (1981–1985, 1989–1999)
- Joseph Bénard (1999–2005)
- Jean Giasson (2005–?)
- Germain St-Amour (?–2009)
- Denis Charron (2009–2017)
- Alphée Moreau (2017–2022)
- Mario Langevin (2022–present)

== See also ==
- List of anglophone communities in Quebec
