= Larry Archambeault =

Canadian ice hockey player

- Born: February 22, 1919 Aylmer, Quebec, Canada
- Died: May 6, 1981 (aged 62) Lewisdale, Maryland, USA
- Height: 5 ft 11 in (180 cm)
- Weight: 180 lb (82 kg; 12 st 12 lb)
- Position: Left wing
- Shot: Left
- Played for: New York Rovers; Baltimore Orioles; Manhattan Arrows; Pittsburgh Hornets; Hollywood Wolves; Washington Lions; Philadelphia Rockets; Louisville Blades; Buffalo Bisons; Seattle Ironmen; Johnstown Jets
- Playing career: 1938–1953

Larry Andrew Archambeault (February 22, 1919 - May 6, 1981 ) was a Canadian professional ice hockey player.

Between 1938 and 1953, Archambeault played for various teams in the Eastern Hockey League, American Hockey League, Pacific Coast Hockey League and the United States Hockey League.

His name was actually Laurier André Archambeault, but was anglicized when he moved to the United States.
