= Jim Bailey =

Jim Bailey may refer to:

- Jim Bailey (American football) (born 1948), American gridiron football player
- Jim Bailey (runner) (1929–2020), Australian runner, competed at the 1956 Olympics
- Jim Bailey (baseball) (1934–2022), American baseball pitcher
- Jim Bailey (cricketer) (1908–1988), English cricketer
- Jim Bailey (entertainer) (1938–2015), American singer, actor, and female impressionist

== Other uses ==
- Jim C. Bailey Middle School, located in Escambia County, Florida, U.S.

== See also ==
- James Bailey (disambiguation)
- Jimmy Bailey (born 1954), Honduran footballer
- Tim Bailey (born 1963), Australian journalist
