= Lac des Pins (Aumond, Quebec) =

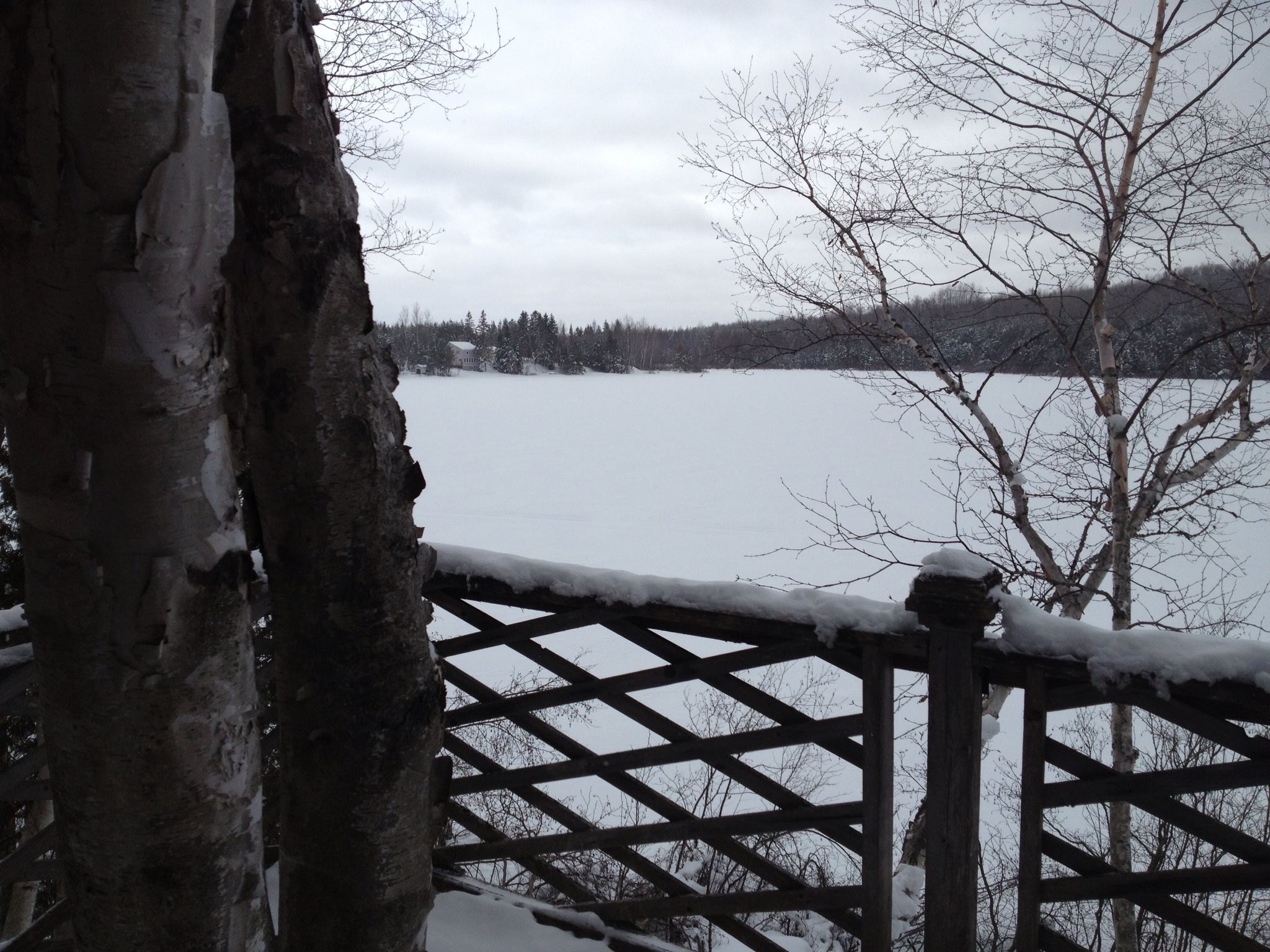

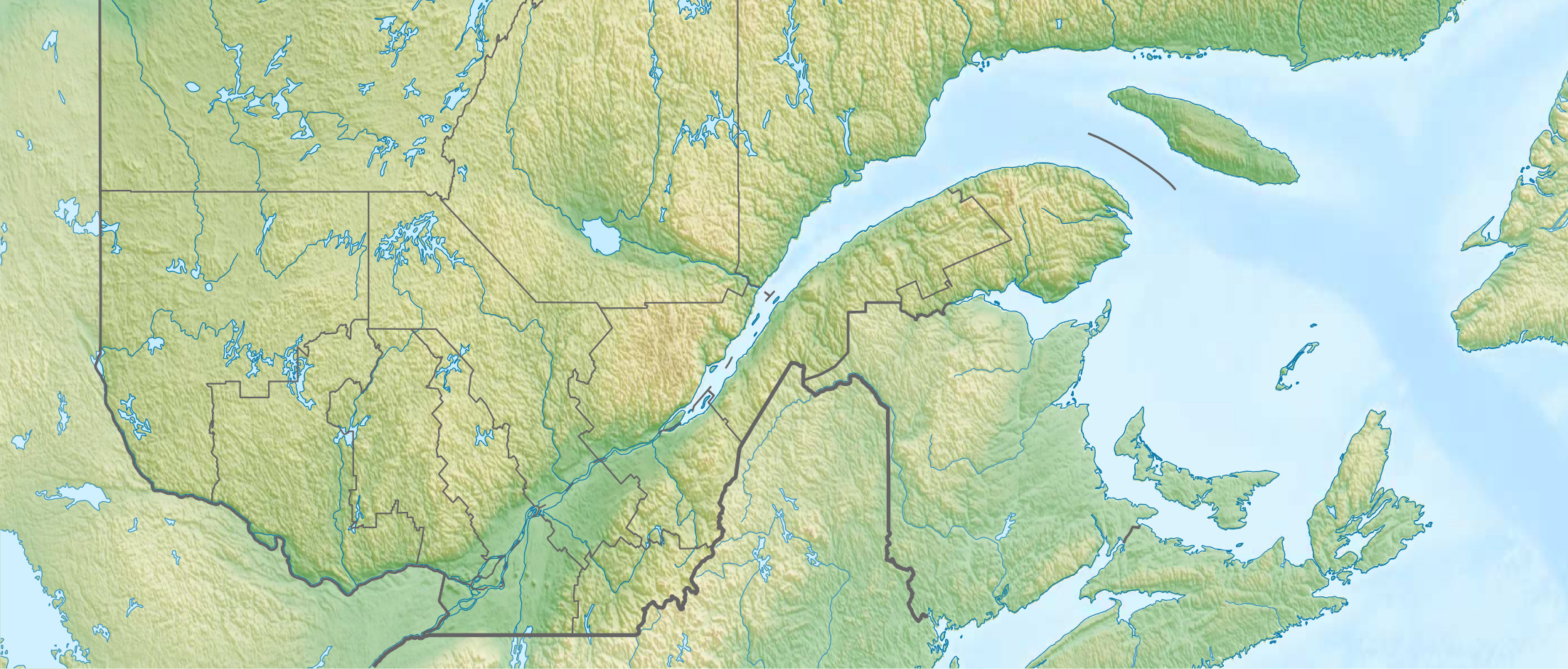
- Location within Quebec South
- Location: Aumond, Quebec, Canada
- Coordinates: 46°29′03″N 75°49′26″W
- Type: lake
- Surface area: 60 acres (24 ha)

Lac des Pins is a 60 acres (24 ha) spring-fed freshwater lake in the town of Aumond, La Vallée-de-la-Gatineau Regional County Municipality in the Outaouais region of western Quebec, Canada. The area was settled by timber merchants in the late 1800s.
