= Jean Woods =

Canadian politician (1850-1928)

Jean Joseph Emond Woods (1850 – 1928) was a Canadian physician and public servant. He served as mayor of Aylmer from 1898 to 1900.

== Early life ==
The son of John Robert Woods and Zoé Desautels, Woods studied medicine at McGill University, graduating in 1875.

== Personal life ==
Woods married Corrine Bourgeois and moved into their new Aylmer, Quebec Main Street home office in 1883.

== Public office ==
In 1885, Woods was named a public vaccinator and medical officer by the Aylmer Board of Health. In 1918, he became Quebec's inspector of prisons and asylums, so moved to Lachine.

== Death ==
Woods died in Lachine in 1928.
