= William Jackson Conroy =

William Jackson Conroy (1849 – December 15, 1915) was a miller, farmer and politician in Quebec. He served as mayor of Aylmer from 1882 to 1884 and from 1891 to 1892.

He was born in Aylmer, the son of Robert Conroy and Mary McConnell. With his brother Robert, he owned a sawmill and a flour mill at Deschênes. He also operated a large farm. In 1892, he married Maria McDonald. Conroy served on Aylmer municipal council in 1881 and from 1884 to 1890. During the 1890s, the brothers invented a harvesting machine pulled by houses which was in use in western Canada until it was replaced by steam-powered equipment. In 1895, they established the Hull Electric Company which operated street cars driven by hydro-electric power and also powered electric street lights.
