= Stavros Schizas =

Greek basketball player

Stavros Schizas Σταύρος Σχίζας
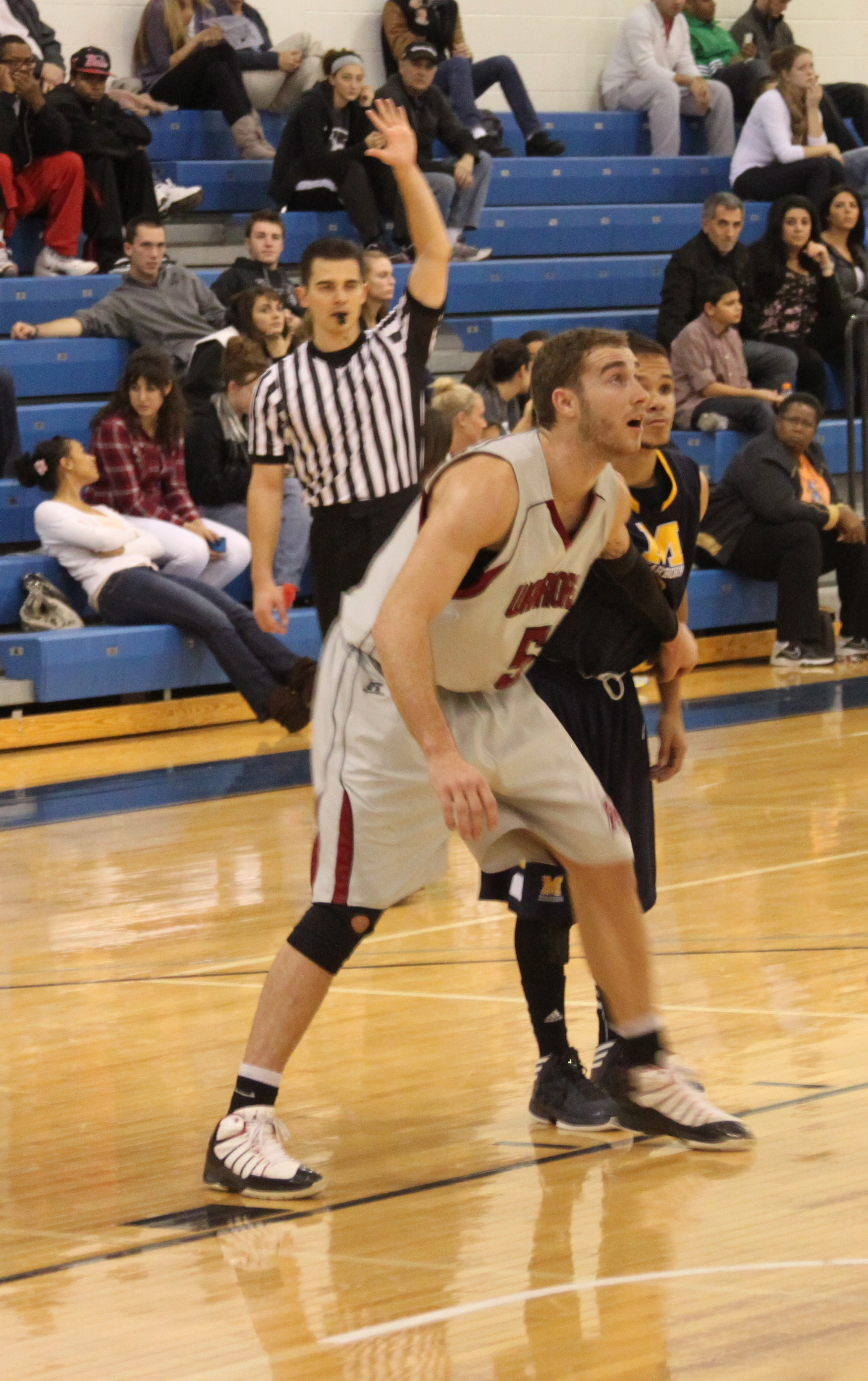
- Schizas in action with Rochester

CSU Sibiu
- Position: Small forward / Shooting guard

Personal information
- Born: January 10, 1989 (age 37) Athens, Greece
- Listed height: 6 ft 5 in (1.96 m)
- Listed weight: 205 lb (93 kg)

Career information
- College: Kirtland CC (2010–2012); Rochester (2012–2014)
- NBA draft: 2014: undrafted
- Playing career: 2014–present

Career history
- 2014–2016: Rethymno
- 2016–2017: Kymi
- 2017–2018: Kolossos Rodou
- 2018–2020: PAOK
- 2020–2021: Iraklis
- 2021–2023: Aris
- 2023–2024: PAOK
- 2024–present: CSU Sibiu

Stavros Schizas (Greek: Σταύρος Σχίζας); (born January 10, 1989, in Athens, Greece) is a Greek professional basketball player who plays for CSU Sibiu of the Liga Națională. He is 6 ft 5 in (1.96 m) tall and plays as a swingman.

== College career ==
Schizas played college basketball at Kirtland Community College and at Rochester College. As a sophomore, Schizas averaged 16,5 points and 8,5 rebounds per game.

== Professional career ==
In 2014, Schizas began his professional career with the Greek League club Rethymno Aegean. He stayed to the club until 2016.

On July 4, 2016, Schizas joined Kymis. On July 1, 2017, after playing one year with Kymis, Schizas signed with Kolossos. On July 14, 2018, Schizas moved to Thessaloniki for PAOK, signing a two-year contract.

On July 23, 2020, Schizas switched to Iraklis Thessaloniki.

On July 25, 2021, Schizas signed with his third Greek Basket League club from Thessaloniki, Aris, where he was named team captain alongside Olivier Hanlan. He appeared in only 10 league games due to injuries, averaging 4 points and 1.4 rebounds in 10 minutes per contest. In his second season with Aris, Schizas appeared in 15 league games, averaging 2.4 points and 1.2 rebounds in 11 minutes per contest.

On August 5, 2023, Schizas returned to PAOK.
