= Alexandre Bourgeau =

Alexandre Bourgeau (Aylmer) (August 18, 1828 – August 16, 1882) was a merchant and politician in Quebec. He served as mayor of Aylmer from 1872 to 1873, from 1880 to 1881 and from 1881 to 1882.

The son of Alexandre Bourgeau and Madeleine Paradis, he was born in Lavaltrie, Lower Canada. Bourgeau became an orphan at the age of 14 and worked for a local notary for some time. Later he became a shoemaker and came to Aylmer in 1846. The following year, he married Sophie Noël. He served on Aylmer municipal council several times between 1850 and 1870 and then from 1873 to 1877. He was official assigner for the court and a regional director for the Upper Ottawa Steamboat Company. He also was a money lender and sold lumber and charcoal. Bourgeau served as secretary and then chair for the Aylmer school board. He was elected mayor for the last time in February 1882 and he died several months later.
