= École secondaire de l'Île =

Location
- 255, rue Saint-Rédempteur; Gatineau, Quebec, J8X 2T4; Canada
- Coordinates: 45.43575°N 75.7238°W

Information
- School type: High school
- School board: Commission Scolaire des Portages-de-l'Outaouais
- Principal: Michel Letang
- Grades: Secondary 1-5
- Language: French
- Website: ile.cspo.qc.ca

École secondaire de l'Île (English translation: Island High School) is a public high school in Gatineau, Quebec. The school is located in the Hull sector of Gatineau on Saint-Rédempteur Boulevard where it meets Sacré-Cœur Boulevard. The school is run by the Centre de services scolaire des Portages-de-l'Outaouais. It is located near several bike trails and the Robert Guertin Arena, the old home of the Gatineau Olympiques, of the Quebec Major Junior Hockey League, now located at the Centre Slush Puppie.

The school offers several special programs, including an international education program for qualified students, which is part of the International Baccalaureate (IB) program, and the "ExplorAction" program which offers students the ability to open their horizons and to get to know themselves better through stimulating self exploration projects and activities.

== Alumni ==
- Eva Avila, Canadian Idol winner in 2006, graduated from l'École secondaire De l'Île.
