= James Baillie (Canadian politician) =

James Baillie (1860 – April 7, 1935) was a woodworker, merchant, contractor and political figure in Quebec. He served as mayor of Aylmer from 1914 to 1916.

== Personal life ==
He was the son of Scottish immigrants who settled in Aylmer in 1850: James Baillie, a woodworker, and Elizabeth Gow. He married Jessie Catherine McIntosh. In 1890, with his brother William, he built a steam-powered sawmill. They also built boats and sold lumber. Baillie served on the Aylmer municipal council and on the South Hull township council. He also was a building contractor, building summer resorts on both sides of the Ottawa River.

== Death ==
Baillie died at home in Aylmer at the age of 75.

The Baillie sawmill played an important role in the development of the town and continued to operate until 1940. A plaque marks its former location.
