= Cégep Beauce-Appalaches =

Vocational college in Quebec, Canada

Coordinates: 46°7′31.89″N 70°40′10.33″W

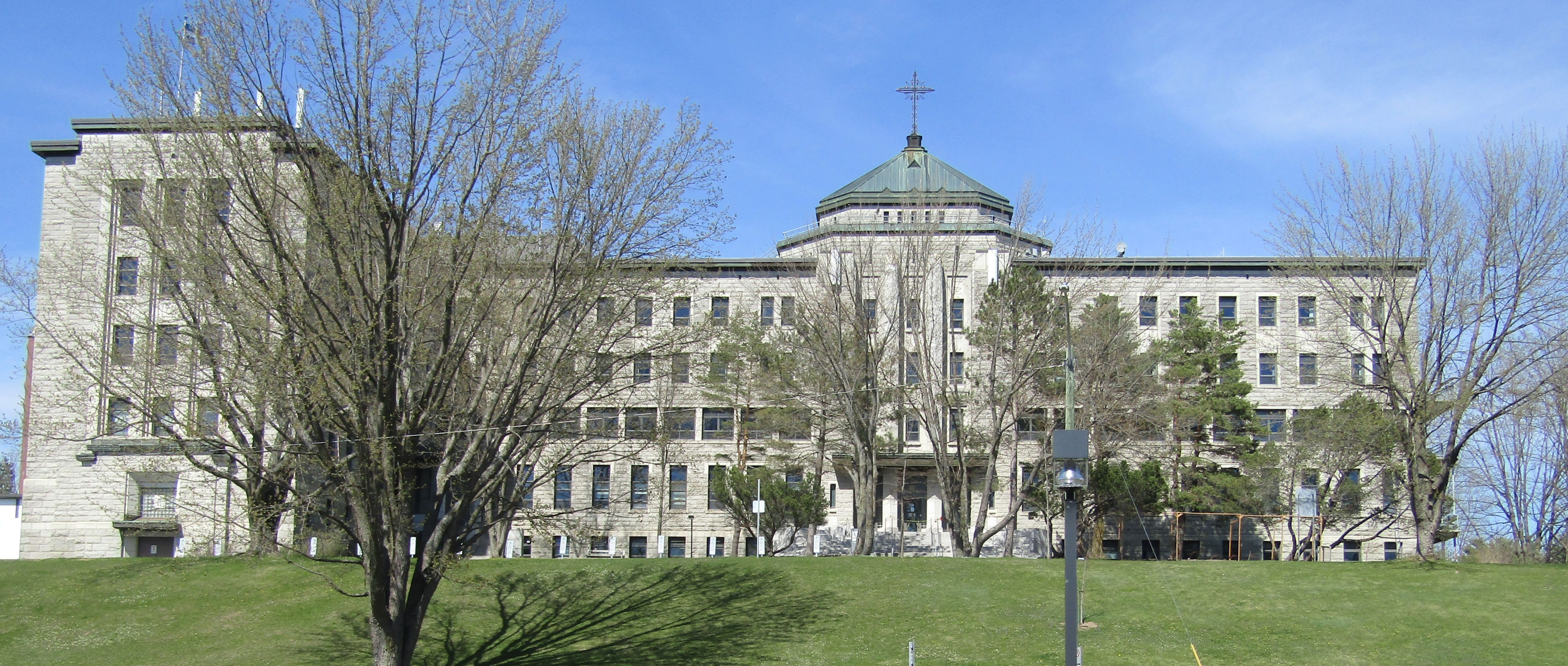
- Motto: Enseignment superieur. Passions...Action! (French)
- Motto in English: Superior Training. Passion ... Action!
- Type: CEGEP
- Established: 1968
- Academic affiliations: ACCC, CCAA, QSSF, AUCC,
- Location: 1055, 116e rue Saint-Georges, Quebec; G5Y 3G1
- Campus: Urban
- Website: www.cegepba.qc.ca

Cégep Beauce-Appalaches is a CEGEP in Saint-Georges, Quebec, Canada.

== History ==
The college traces its origins to the merger of several institutions which became public ones in 1967, when the Quebec system of CEGEPs was created.

== Programs ==
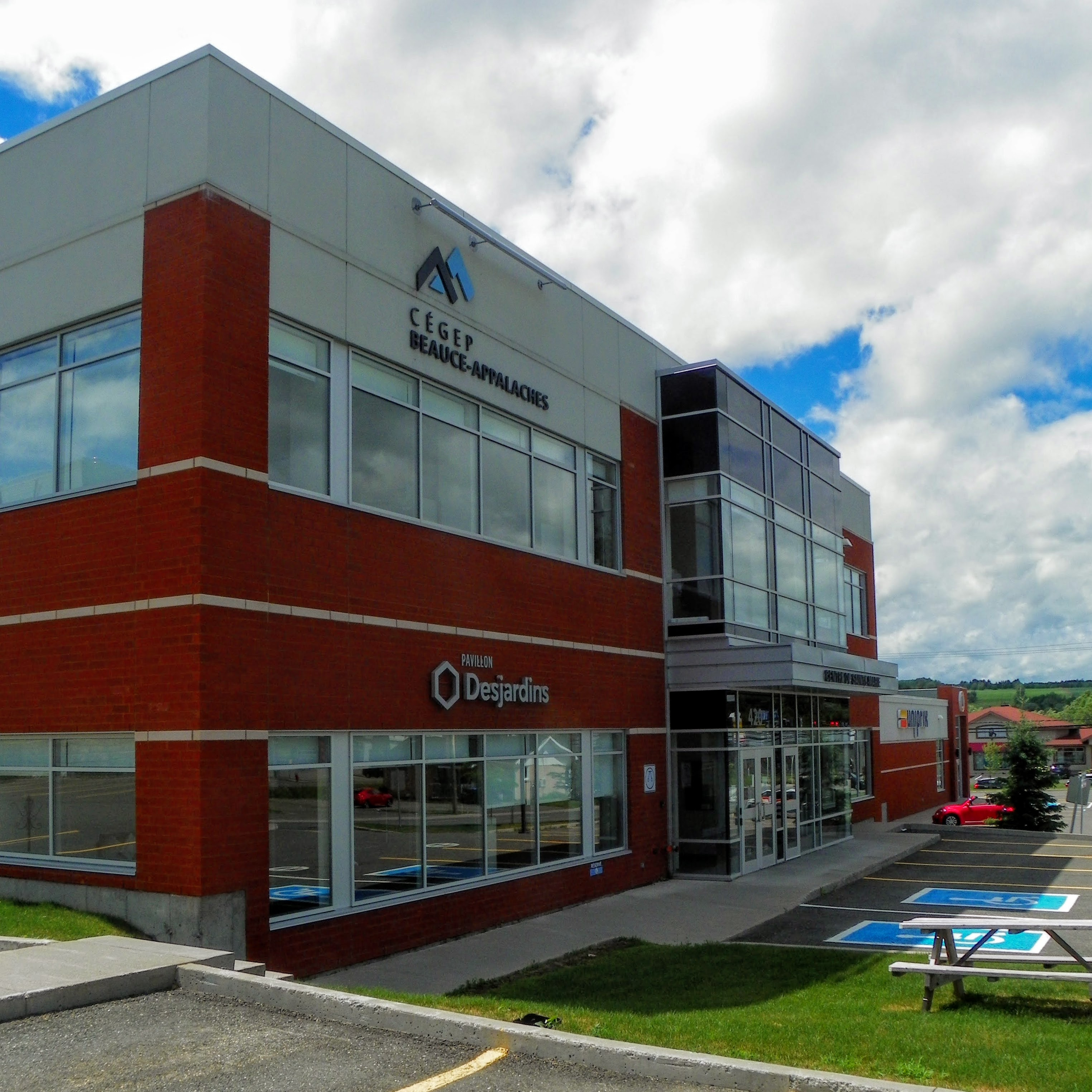
Sainte-Marie collegial studies centre.

The Province of Quebec awards a Diploma of Collegial Studies for two types of programs: two years of pre-university studies or three years of vocational (technical) studies. The pre-university programs, which take two years to complete, cover the subject matters which roughly correspond to the additional year of high school given elsewhere in Canada in preparation for a chosen field in university. The technical programs, which take three-years to complete, applies to students who wish to pursue a skilled trade.

== See also ==
- List of colleges in Quebec
- Higher education in Quebec
