= École secondaire Grande-Rivière =

Coordinates: 45°24′13″N 75°50′36″W

Location
- 100, rue Broad; Gatineau, Quebec, J9H 6A9; Canada

Information
- School type: High school
- Founded: 1975
- School board: Commission Scolaire des Portages-de-l'Outaouais
- Principal: Serge Guitard
- Grades: Secondary 1-5
- Enrollment: 1800 students
- Language: Canadian French
- Website: www.esgr.cspo.qc.ca

École secondaire Grande-Rivière, commonly abbreviated as ESGR or E.S.G.R. (both officially and non-officially), a francophone secondary school in Aylmer, Quebec. Its total population is over 2000, including 1992 pupils and 191 faculty members.

== Structure ==
The school is divided into 7 major sectors, each unofficially called by the hundred of its number (example: "Secteur 400). The divisions between sections are generally determined by the floor on which they are, and the order in which they were built.

Facilities include a large gymnasium, swimming pool (also used for public swimming classes), two symphony practice rooms, a cafeteria, several manual work-related rooms for special education, a small greenhouse, and an extensive laboratory section.

=== Flooding ===
In recent years, the school's roof has been known to leak rather severely, occasioning the school's temporary closure at least twice in the past four years, including 2004's Hurricane Frances record rainfall. Work began on new roofing in 2005, although part of the applied roof is rumoured to be of temporary nature and quality. The last flood, having happened in autumn of 2005 (after the new roofing was installed), was cause for the school's closure for the second half of the day. Its aftermath was rife with students poking fun at the school's roofing, and by extension, its budget. In 2019, the school still has some leaking problems, but they are less frequent.

== Programs ==
=== Standard program ===
This is the standard Quebec education system's curriculum. It involves Secondary years I through V; elective courses include Art/Music options; Regular/Bilingual English (both for all levels); Physics; Chemistry; Twentieth Century History; Advanced Biology (for Secondary V students); Mathematics CST, TS or SN (in Secondary IV and V). The bulk of attendees are in this program. Classes change from subject to subject, and the choices available generally suit all students.

=== Concentration program ===
This program is similar to the standard program, except that its members are fewer, and they enjoy more courses of their respective choice (either Arts or Music).

==== Arts ====
Members of the Arts program often participate in decoration of the school, either for holidays, thematic weeks, or school projects and they have an exposition at the beginning of may every year.

==== Music ====
The Music program is incorporated into the school symphony, and in their final year, may also take part in a stage band.

=== IB Middle Years Program ===
This is likely the most restrictive of the programs. It functions as an IBO supplement to the standard curriculum, the most obvious difference being that it features mandatory Spanish classes from Secondary II through III, and does not allow students to choose any other courses (they are required to take the most advanced classes in almost all cases). The subjects of Arts and Music are divided by level: Secondary I-II take Music, and III-V take Arts.

There are three or four classes (each of 28-32). Also unlike other programs, students remain in the same class throughout all the subjects - in every class, all the students are the same. This results in a more tight-knit class than in the other programs, which can both be a treat and an inconvenience to teachers.

Despite the fact that it is often viewed as a program for gifted students by the regular students, there are students from all backgrounds, of all types, and of all ambitions in the program. While there is an admittable difference in grading between the "internationals" and other students, this is often explained on the basis that those who are accepted into the program are chosen for their desire to work harder and learn more enriched content.
