= William George Mulligan =

William George Mulligan (February 10, 1856 – October 5, 1942) was a farmer, merchant and politician in Quebec. He served as mayor of Aylmer from 1913 to 1914 and from 1929 to 1934.

He was born in Aylmer, Canada East, the son of James Henry Mulligan and Margaret Kernahan. In 1902, Mulligan married Mary Irwin McDermott. At various times in his life, he farmed, raised livestock. was a merchant dealing in gardening supplies and was a lumber merchant. Mulligan served on Aylmer municipal council from 1894 to 1897, from 1899 to 1904, in 1908 and from 1910 to 1913. He died in Ottawa at the age of 86.

In 1933, Wilfrid J. Lavigne, who had run unsuccessfully for mayor, filed a complaint that Mulligan had not complied with all the conditions required by Quebec municipal law in the election held in June of that year.
