= James Bayley (cricketer) =

English cricketer

James Bayley (dates unknown) was an English professional cricketer who made four known appearances in important matches from 1773 to 1783.

== Career ==
He was associated with Hampshire.

== External sources ==
- CricketArchive record
