= James Henry Mulligan =

James Henry Mulligan (1823 – July 15, 1892) was an Irish-born landowner and politician in Quebec. He served as mayor of Aylmer from 1881 to 1882.

Born in Drumlish, County Longford and baptised July 11, 1824 in Ballymahon, Shrule, Co. Longford, Ireland, he came to Aylmer in 1854. He worked as a butcher and baker and ran a livery stable. He also ran a stagecoach. On April 30, 1855, Mulligan married Margaret Catherine Kernahan. He later became one of the major landowners in the region and a prominent breeder of cattle and horses, many of which he won prizes for at agricultural fairs. Mulligan served on Aylmer municipal council from 1872 to 1880, from 1882 to 1885 and from 1890 to 1892 and was, for a time, the mayor of Aylmer. His large brick house still stands in Aylmer, Quebec. He died at the age of 69 while still a member of council.

One of his eleven children, his son William George later also served as Aylmer mayor.
