= Charles Symmes =

Canadian politician

- Charles Symmes Esq.

Second Mayor of Aylmer
- Incumbent
- Assumed office 1855-1858, 1860-1862

Personal details
- Born: April 4, 1798 Charlestown, Massachusetts, Middlesex County, Massachusetts, British America
- Died: August 25, 1868 (at 70 years) Aylmer, Quebec
- Spouse: Hannah Ricker (1807-1879)
- Children: Abigail; Elizabeth; Sarah Jane; Charles; Thomas John; John Thomas; Edmund; Tiberius; Hannah
- Parent(s): Capt. John Symmes, Elizabeth Wright
- Occupation: Businessman, Politician

Charles Symmes (April 4, 1798 – August 25, 1868) was an American-born business owner and politician in Quebec. Considered the father of Aylmer, Quebec he was its mayor from 1855 to 1858 and again from 1860 to 1862.

He was born in Charlestown, Massachusetts, the son of Captain John Symmes and Elizabeth Wright, the sister of Philemon Wright. In 1819, he was hired by his uncle as clerk and bookkeeper while Philemon's oldest son, Philemon Junior, owned or was in charge of most of the Wright Farms, including the Chaudière Lake Farm at Turnpike End. Philemon Junior founded the village in 1818, when he cleared the farm, built the Wright Hotel, a house, a tavern and two stores to accommodate all the travelers who journeyed above the falls, up the Ottawa River.

In November 1821, Philemon Junior died suddenly in a tragic coach accident. As a result, Philemon Sr. needed a new manager for the Chaudière Lake Farm. His other sons were busy managing the family's timber business and so he chose Charles to be the new manager. The Wright Hotel was made ready for his occupancy in 1822.

In October 1823, the arrangement was made official and more equitable, with Charles named as manager/partner of the farm & landing with P. Wright & Sons in a lease agreement, where Charles would manage the farm, the hotel, and tavern/store at the waterfront. A dispute arose when Charles claimed that the company did not honour the terms of the agreement, so Charles tore up the contract and refused to repay the money he owed his uncle. The dispute was settled in court with the decision ending in favor of Philemon Wright. Despite the dispute - and contrary to the tales from some historians - relations between Charles and his uncle always remained cordial, as illustrated by their correspondence - Symmes even named two of his children after Wrights.

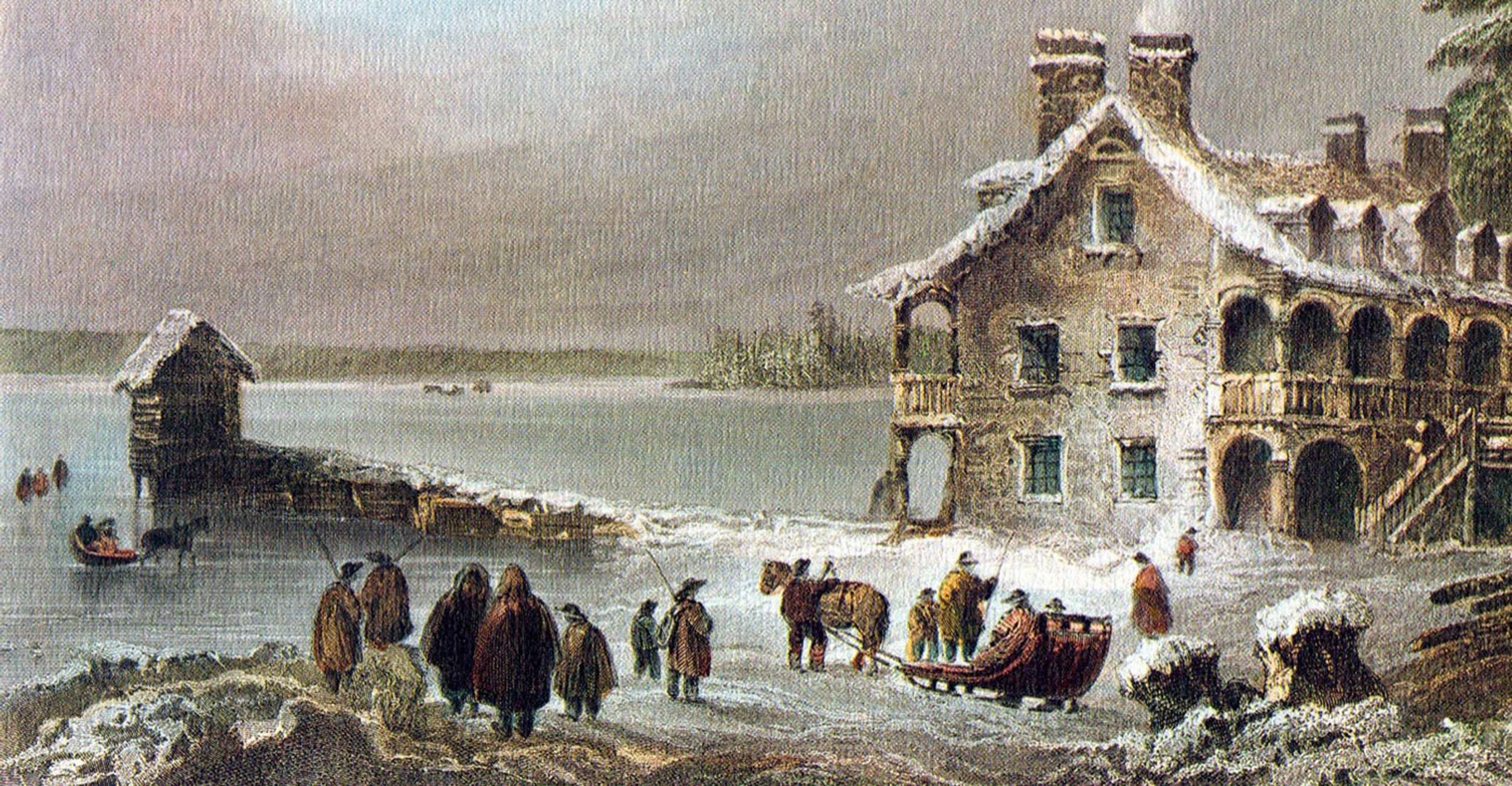
Symmes Inn by William H. Bartlett, 1842.

Charles set out to pursue business on his own at Turnpike End, he acquired property, and in 1830, had his property surveyed and divided up into building lots for sale to create a government village, as per the Crown's directive. In 1831, he built his own hotel, the Aylmer Hotel aka the Symmes Inn (Auberge Symmes). In 1832, he built his own wharf and partnered with Ruggles Wright, John Egan and Joseph-Ignace Aumond to build the steamboat Lady Colborne and operate the first steamboat service on the Upper Ottawa.

The village was originally known as Chaudière Lake Village and Turnpike End, but the landing began to be called Symmes Landing when the steamboat began service at his wharf and Inn. In 1831, Symmes donated land for the construction of churches and public buildings - the post office, courthouse and jail - and the village began to be called Aylmer to honour Lord Aylmer, the governor of Lower Canada.

Charles Symmes served on the board for the Aylmer Academy, was a member of the Aylmer municipal council from 1847 to 1851 and from 1852 to 1855. He later served as prefect for Ottawa County, secretary-treasurer for the county agricultural society, and revenue inspector for the district.

Symmes married Hannah Ricker in 1824. Together, they had nine children: Abigail, Elizabeth, Charles, John, Thomas, Edmund, Tiberius and Hannah. Many of the streets of Aylmer are named for their children. Symmes died in Aylmer at the age of 70.

The hotel that he built later became a museum and has been designated a heritage building by Quebec.
