= Aylmer, Quebec =

Aylmer
- Sector within City of Gatineau
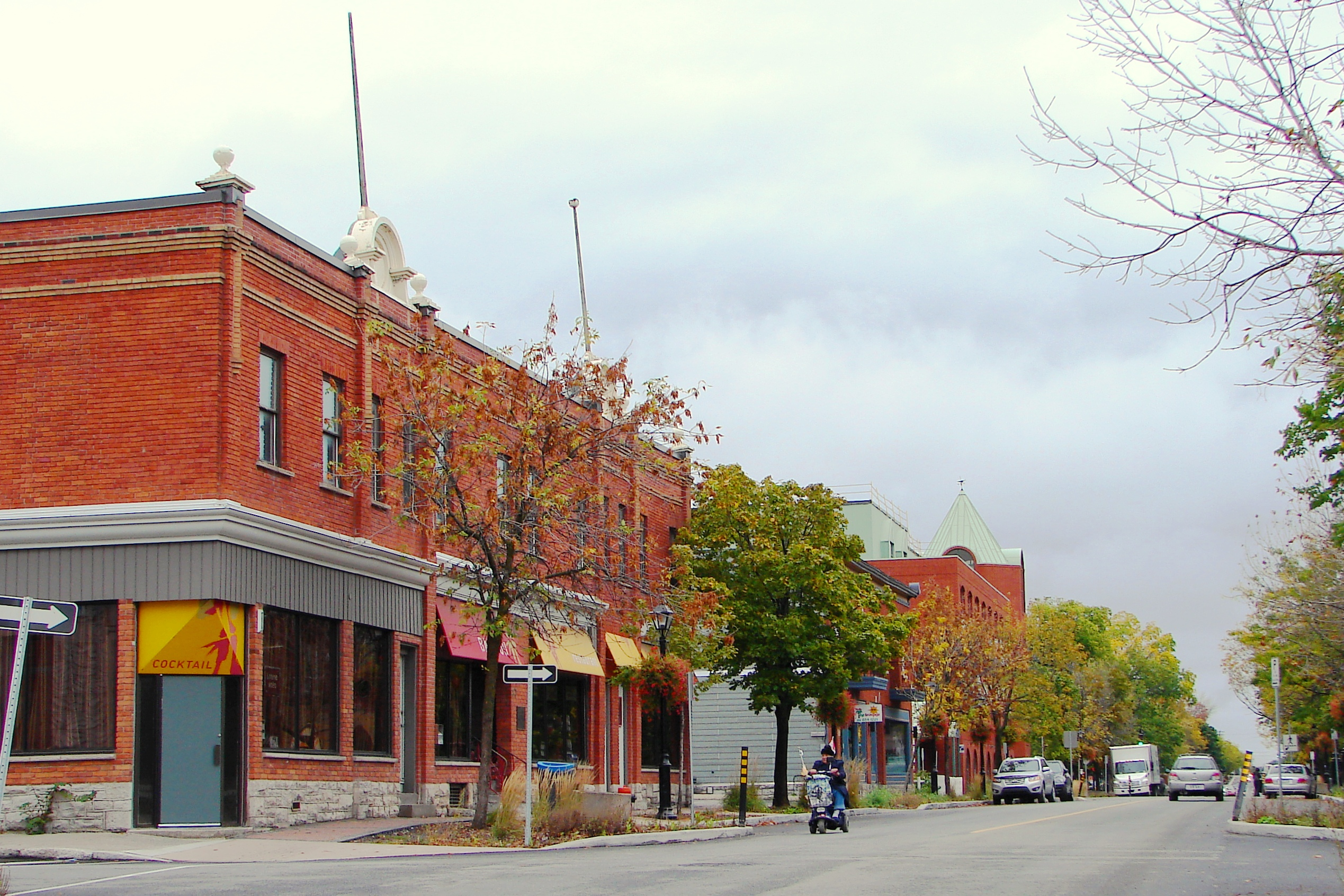
- Rue Principale (Main Street)
- Interactive map of Aylmer
- Coordinates: 45°24′00″N 75°51′00″W
- Country: Canada
- Province: Quebec
- Region: Outaouais
- RCM: Gatineau
- Incorporated: July 1, 1849
- Merged: January 1, 2002 *

Area
  - Land: 88.86 km^{2} (34.31 sq mi)

Population (2011) 2011 census
  - Total: 56,542
  - Change ~2001: +15.1%
  - Dwellings: 15,370
- Demonym: Aylmerite
- Time zone: UTC−05:00 (EST)
  - Summer (DST): UTC−04:00 (EST)
- Area codes: 819, 873
- Access Routes: R-148
- * Merged with Gatineau on January 1, 2002

Aylmer is a former city in Quebec, Canada. It is located on the north shore of the Ottawa River and along Route 148. The settlement that became Aylmer was founded in 1818 by Philemon Wright Junior.

In January 2002, it amalgamated into the city of Gatineau, which is part of Canada's National Capital Region. Aylmer's population in 2011 was 55,113. It is named after Lord Aylmer, who was a governor general of British North America and a lieutenant governor of Lower Canada from 1830 to 1835.

It bills itself as the "Recreation Capital of the National Capital", given its many golf courses, green spaces, spas, marina, and bicycle paths. There is little industry in the sector, the area being mainly residential. Virtually all the major shops, services, and restaurants are located along Chemin d'Aylmer. The sector's indoor swimming pool and skateboard park are also located on that road.

The population of the Hull-Aylmer Federal electoral district, which combines the communities of Hull and Aylmer, was 105,419 in 2016. The 2016 census of Hull-Aylmer showed that the population was about 67% francophone, 18% anglophone, and 15% native speakers of other languages. Much of its workforce commutes across the river to Ottawa.

== History ==
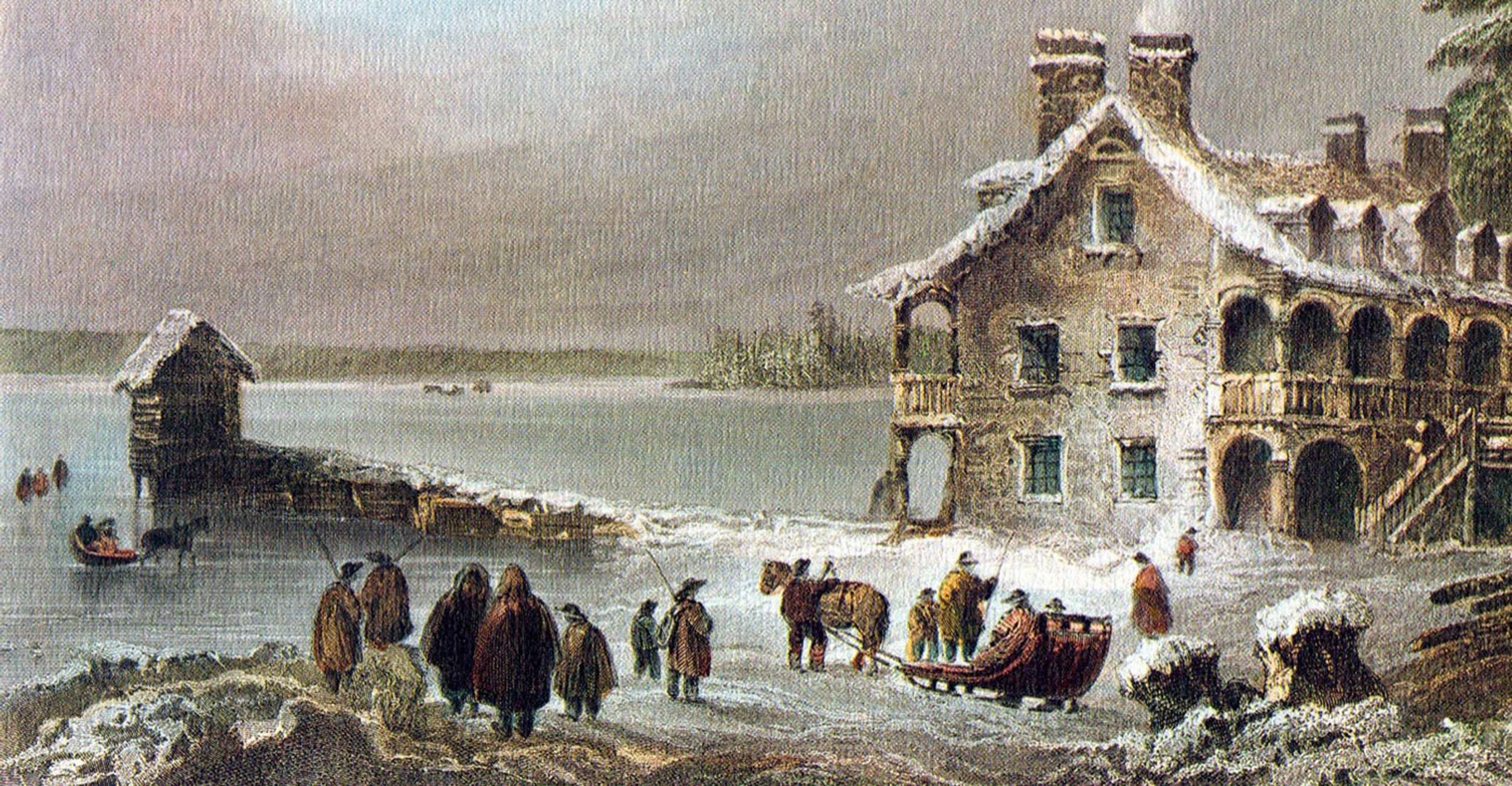
Symmes Inn by William H. Bartlett, 1842.

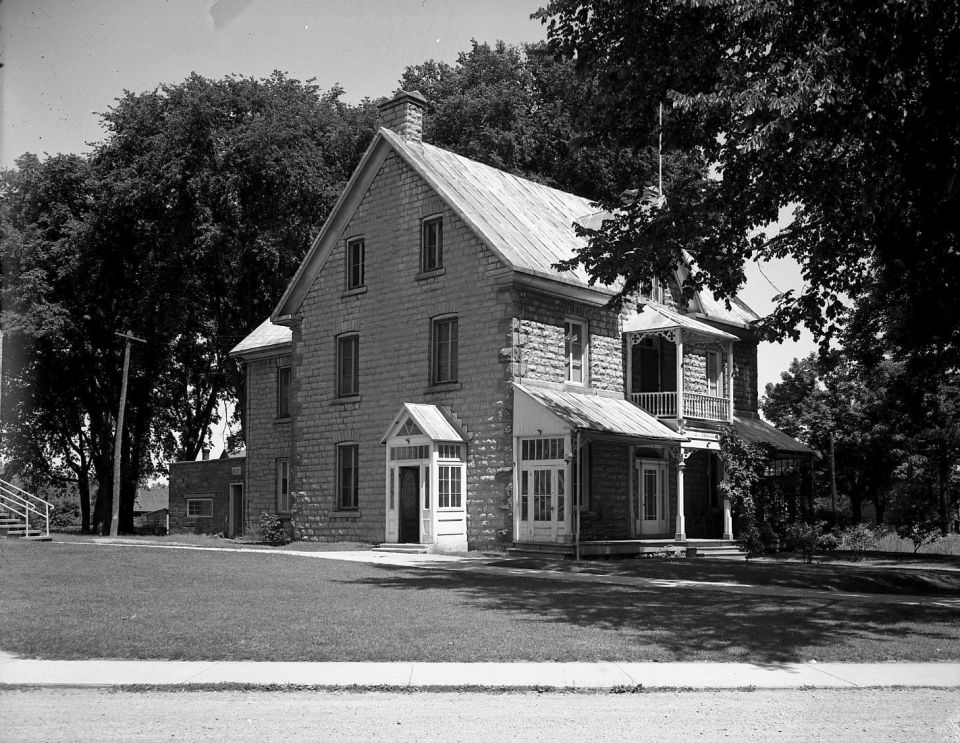
Presbytery of Saint-Paul Parish, Aylmer.

Prior to its foundation, parts of Aylmer, like most surrounding areas of the Ottawa region, were often occupied as summer camps by the Algonquin First Nations population. The first European explorers known to reach the actual location of Aylmer were Nicolas-du-Vigneau and Samuel de Champlain during the early 17th century in their explorations west of Quebec City. It was only during the early 19th century that colonization began in the region; during the same period the foundations of the communities of Hull and Bytown were being established.

In 1800, the order of the day was to settle the land by granting the responsibility to groups of "leaders and associates" led and funded by an individual who would be granted large tracts of land for his efforts to create a settlement. Almost 40,000 acres of land in the Township of Hull were granted to Philemon Wright, an American ex-pat from Woburn, Massachusetts who was the pioneer and founder of the first permanent settlement of the Ottawa Valley. Many settlers arrived in the first years and as associates, were granted large 100 and 200 acre lots to farm just west of the new settlement, and a road soon stretched from Wright's Town, first to the Deschênes Landing by 1802, then in 1805 it was extended west to the Chaudière Lake Landing (now called Lake Deschênes). The road was improved and widened in 1818 and, with the addition of two toll booths, it became known as the Britannia Turnpike. The village at its western extremity was known as Chaudière Lake Village, then more widely called Turnpike End.

In that same year of 1818, Philemon's oldest son, Philemon Junior, founded the village when he cleared 30 acres of the Chaudière Lake Farm (a supply farm for the timber industry) at Turnpike End, improved the Chaudière Lake Landing, and built the Wright Hotel, a tavern and two stores, laying down the infrastructure of the village. The landing at Turnpike End had become a busy stopping-off point so the hotel, tavern, and stores were built to accommodate all the travelers who journeyed to and from the Upper Ottawa River.

In November 1821, Philemon Junior died in a coach accident. As a result, Philemon Sr. needed a new manager for the Chaudière Lake Farm. His other sons were busy managing the family's timber business, so Philemon Sr. chose his nephew, Charles Symmes, to be the new manager. Charles, 23 years-old at the time, had been in his uncle's employ for two years. The hotel was made ready for his occupancy in 1822. In October 1823, the arrangement was made official with Charles named manager of the Farm and the Wright Hotel with P. Wright & Sons in a lease agreement. Charles would manage the farm and the hotel until a dispute arose between Charles and his uncle Philemon regarding the terms of their agreement. Charles tore up the contract and refused to repay his uncle the money that he owed him. The issue was settled in court, in the favour of Philemon Sr. Despite the court ruling, correspondence between uncle and nephew remained cordial for years.

Charles left P. Wright & Sons to pursue business on his own at Turnpike End, and had acquired a 200-acre lot and, so in 1830 he had his property surveyed and divided up into village lots for sale and to create a government village for a post office and jail, as per the Crown's directive. He also bought some of Harvey Parker's waterfront lot to build a new wharf. He then joined the Union Forwarding Company, founded by John Egan, Ruggles Wright and Joseph Aumond, a company that ran the steamboat Lady Colborne, the first to operate in that area.

In 1831, he built a large stone building that he named the Aylmer Hotel, which soon after became known as the Symmes Inn (aka l'Auberge Symmes). With all of the improvements at the landing, locals would begin calling it the Symmes Landing.

The post office and county registration office in Aylmer were opened in 1831; it was named after the Governor-General Lord Aylmer. The village was first incorporated in 1847 and served as administrative centre for the region until 1897. A courthouse and jail that served the Outaouais region were built in 1852. With the important shipbuilding yards on the banks of the Ottawa and its significant growth as one of the region's economic powerhouses of that time,

The Aylmer Boating Club was founded in 1890. The club was renamed the Aylmer Yacht Club in 1900. In 1901, Moses Chamberlain Edey designed the clubhouse. By 1906, the club was renamed the Victoria Yacht Club. In 1921, the Club burned down and was not rebuilt.

During most of the 19th century, the town of Aylmer, like much of the Outaouais, was an important centre for the wood industry. During that period several steam boats were built alongside the Deschênes Rapids and the Ottawa River across from Britannia. Railroad construction began during the early Canadian Confederation years. Meanwhile, the economy of Aylmer was more focused on the wood and wood pulp industries and much later, on tourism. In 1921, a destructive fire ravaged large sections of the village destroying dozens of homes and businesses. During the Great Depression Aylmer's biggest sawmill closed its doors.

Aylmer would regain importance during the second half of the 20th century when, due to urban sprawling from the Ottawa and Gatineau areas, it became an important suburb to the region. In 1975 the villages of Lucerne and Deschênes, located just east of downtown Aylmer, were amalgamated. Several new residential developments were created on the northern and eastern side of old Aylmer. Numerous businesses and shopping malls were built along the Main Street including les Galeries Aylmer and the Glenwood Plaza, the latter being destroyed by a fire in 2005 and rebuilt. In addition, several golf courses, a Sheraton hotel, and a movie theatre were added through the city. On August 4, 1994, a destructive tornado tore through the city damaging nearly 400 to 500 homes (including a dozen homes that were completely destroyed) and injuring at least 15 people. Damage figures were estimated at $15 million. Rated F3 on the Fujita scale, the tornado tracked for 8 kilometers and was one of the most intense tornadoes in history across the National Capital Region. Aylmer also saw many power outages and very dangerous driving conditions throughout the North American ice storm of 1998, which left more than 4 million people without electricity, most of them in southern Quebec, western New Brunswick and Eastern Ontario, some of them for an entire month. The Canadian Forces were called in to assist with the relief efforts.

Before the amalgamation of the Urban Community Region of the Outaouais, Aylmer had a population exceeding 40,000 with additional growth after 2002 stemming from development in several areas of the sector, including the expansion of the Plateau de la Capitale neighbourhood which started in the former city of Hull in the early 1990s.

In recent years, efforts have been made to create the Boucher Forest protected area, in light of increasing suburban sprawl and housing development. The group that strives for protection of the Boucher Forest is the Fondation Forêt Boucher, the Boucher Forest Foundation. The forest is a reservoir of biodiversity in the region; at-risk and endangered species such as Panax quinquefolium (American ginseng), and Juglans cinerea (butternut) exist in this threatened ecosystem. The forest is bound by Highway 148 to the south, Chemin Vanier to the east, the Jardins Lavigne neighbourhood to the west (one of Aylmer's newer suburban areas), and Chemin Pink to the north. Furthermore, an old mining quarry is directly adjacent to the forest's northwest corner.

== Transportation ==
=== Roads and recreational pathways ===
Aylmer is served by provincial Route 148, known as the boulevard des Allumettières within the city of Gatineau, which extends from the Ontario border near Pembroke, to Montreal, about two hours away. Other main roads include the Chemin d'Aylmer/rue Principale and Lucerne Blvd (running east and west)., Vanier, Eardley, Broad/Klock, Wilfrid-Lavigne, Mountain Rd., Pink Rd. Aylmer is connected to Tunney's Pasture and Westboro in Ottawa by the Champlain Bridge, at the southeast corner.

It has been proposed to build an extension from Autoroute 50 in Gatineau that would come though Chelsea and central Aylmer to connect to a new bridge between Deschênes and Britannia in the city of Ottawa, but it remains no more than a plan, mainly due to strong local opposition from Britannia residents.

Aylmer is home to a network of bicycle paths that encircle a central portion of the area and run adjacent to many scenic locations, such as the Aylmer Marina and the Deschênes Rapids. The bike path system is maintained by the National Capital Commission.

=== Public transit ===
Public transit is provided by the Société de transport de l'Outaouais, or STO for short, which runs twelve bus lines through the region (although many only operate during rush hour). The STO has been criticized by Aylmer residents—particularly youth—for not providing enough service to the area, and for not providing enough inter-sector bus lines (the western terminus for most Aylmer lines is in the Rideau Centre in downtown Ottawa). The STO is planning a bus rapid transit system known as Rapibus that would connect the Hull and Gatineau sectors, with the possibility of an expansion to Aylmer.

The railroad bedding still exists from Aylmer's now-defunct rail line, and pressure has been put on the STO to set up a light rail system in Gatineau that could connect to Ottawa's O-Train network via the Prince of Wales Bridge.

== Politics ==
=== Federal ===
In terms of population, Aylmer makes up about one third of the riding of Hull—Aylmer, which had elected a Liberal member of parliament in every federal election since its conception in 1984 — its predecessors, the ridings of Hull and Wright, in place from 1892 to 1984, also only ever elected Liberals. This, however, changed when the riding elected NDP MP Nycole Turmel to the House of Commons of Canada in the 2011 federal election. The Liberals returned to power in the riding with the election of Greg Fergus, Member of Parliament and the Right. Honourable Justin Trudeau.

=== Municipal ===
In the 2005 Gatineau municipal election, Aylmer voters showed particularly strong support for incumbent mayor Marc Bureau, over incumbent and former mayor of "old" Hull Yves Ducharme. Similar voting patterns appeared in the sectors of Buckingham and Masson-Angers, the other two "outlying" regions of Gatineau. This could be due to a perception among residents that the Ducharme administration was more focused on the urban core of the new city, as opposed to the periphery, as well as the rapid development of green-spaces into residential subdivisions. However, six months after the November election, residents are showing the highest level of dissatisfaction with the Bureau administration out of all the sectors, citing Aylmer's being left out of municipal processes, poor quality of municipal services, and little to no action to halt suburban sprawl. Masson-Angers and Buckingham residents are presently showing the most support for the new government.

The City of Gatineau administration had plans to reuse a former landfill site on Cook Road in the north end of the sector to build a new composting plant. A deal was planned with a non-profit organisation called La Ressourcerie to operate the site. However, local residents are strongly opposed with health and environmental concerns especially due to the past of the landfill site. Despite displaying their fierce opposition, which included acts of intimidation and threats towards some councillors, at a Gatineau City Council Meeting, Mayor Marc Bureau mentioned that he will still build the plant at the Cook site, and that according to him it was the best possible site. He later added that he will study other possibilities for the plant.

Aylmer's four wards are presently represented on Gatineau City Council by Steven Boivin (Independent; Aylmer District), Gilles Chagnon (IND; Lucerne District), Caroline Murray (Action Gatineau; Deschênes District) and Anik Des Marais (Action Gatineau; Mitigomijokan District).

==== Amalgamation and de-amalgamation ====
In 2002, the City of Aylmer became a part of Gatineau when the then-Parti Québécois government forcibly merged several clusters of cities and metropolitan areas throughout Québec. Residents of Aylmer were particularly against the amalgamation, citing fears of reduced municipal services, more suburban development, and a loss of cultural identity, as well as geographic differences (Hull and Gatineau arguably constitute a region of conurbation, whereas Aylmer was at the time separated by an expanse of sparsely inhabited green space).

A movement was started to halt the "forced fusion" of five cities surrounding Gatineau. The movement had particularly strong support in Aylmer. Signs reading "Je me souviendrai des fusions forcées" (literally, "I will remember forced fusions," a play on Quebec's motto "Je me souviens") were a common sight.

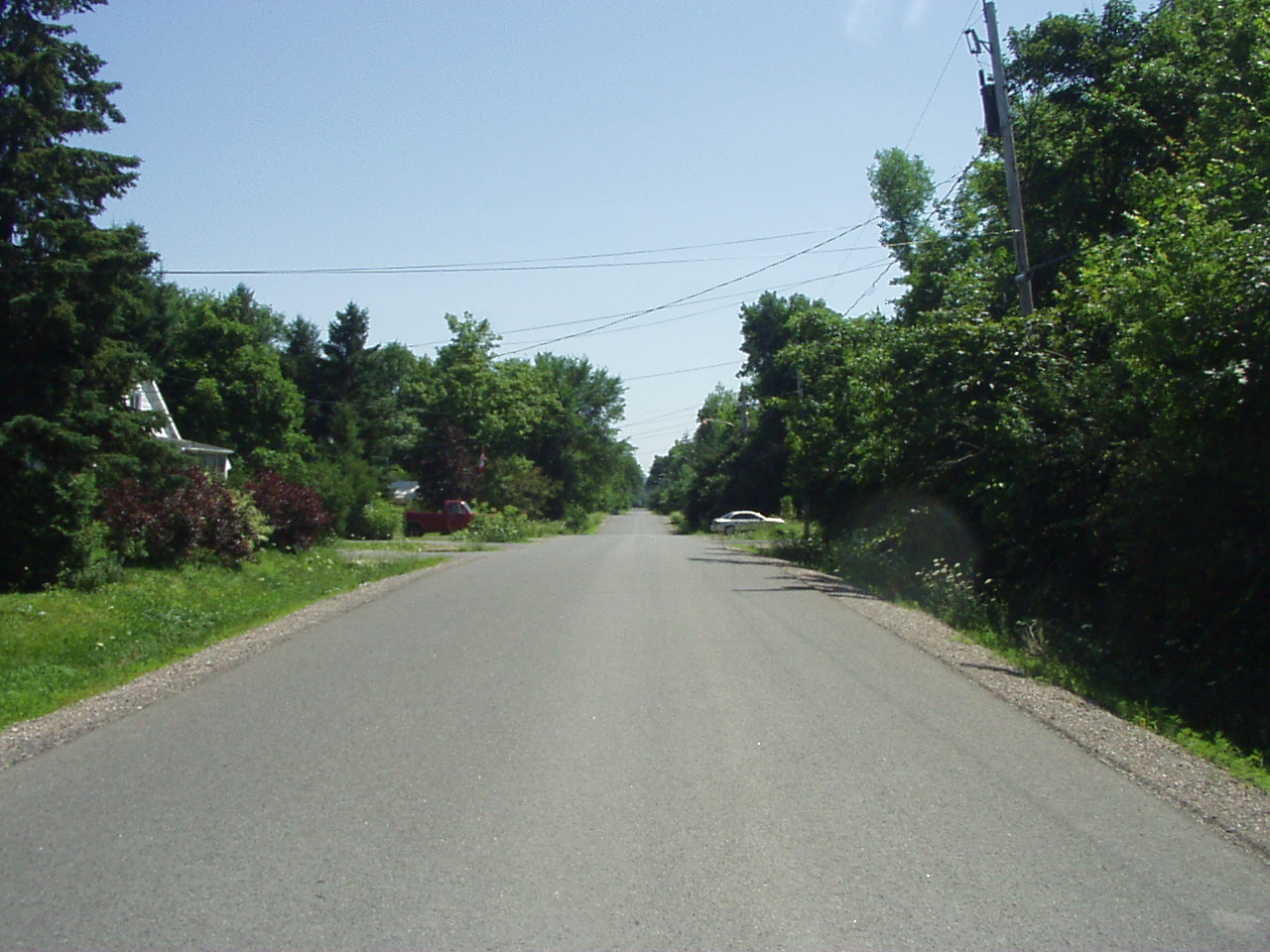
An example of an Aylmer street, built before extensive housing developments.

When the Quebec Liberal Party won the 2003 provincial election, the newly amalgamated former cities were given the opportunity to demerge. A referendum was held to decide the fate of the City of Gatineau which required a double vote: at least 35% of eligible voters from a given sector had to cast ballots, and more than 50% of these had to be in favour of de-amalgamation. Aylmer voters chose to separate from Gatineau but not enough ballots were cast, meaning Aylmer remained a sector of the larger city.

The voting outcome itself was done in such a way that even if Aylmer succeeded in de-amalgamating from Gatineau, they would only do so in name. The de-amalgamation claimed that once Aylmer was its own area once again, it would have to pay for all its own changes, while Gatineau would still be in control of the administration. This meant that the sector of Aylmer would receive no support from the administration that determined what was built where, but would still have to contribute 100% to the costs of the changes voted by the city of Gatineau.

Prior to the merger, Aylmer's residents and municipal laws had strongly opposed extensive construction programs. Following the amalgamation, many of the sector's prized green spaces were cut down for residential construction. Ex-Aylmer neighbourhoods like Wychwood and Village Lucerne have seen their undeveloped spaces sold to contractors.

==== List of pre-amalgamation mayors ====
Sources:

- John Egan (1847–1855)
- Charles Symmes (1855–1858, 1860–1862)
- Robert Conroy (1858–1860, 1866–1868)
- Harvey Parker (1862–1866)
- Alexandre Bourgeau (1872–1873, 1880–1881, 1881–1882)
- Charles Devlin (1873–1878, 1890–1891)
- Thomas B. Prentiss (1878–1879)
- John Gordon (1879–1880)
- James Henry Mulligan (1881–1882)
- William J. Conroy (1882–1884, 1891–1892)
- Narcisse E. Cormier (1884–1890)
- Thomas Ritchie (1892–1898)
- Jean Joseph Emond Woods (1898–1900)
- George C. Rainboth Jr. (1900–1902)
- Thomas John Symmes (1902–1904)
- Thomas D. Sayer (1904–1907)
- Robert Howard Wright (1907–1911)
- Leon Chartier (1911–1913)
- William George Mulligan (1913–1914, 1929–1935)
- James Baillie (1914–1916)
- Armand de Bruyne (1916–1919, 1927–1928)
- Hercule Therien (1919–1921)
- George R. Nash (1921–1925)
- Kenny Edey (1925–1927)
- Amable Elie Beaudry (1928–1929)
- Wilfrid J. Lavigne (1935–1941)
- F. Lloyd Pilgrim (1941–1947)
- Jean-Rene Therien (1947–1948, 1949–1953, 1959–1960)
- Oscar E. Guertin (1949)
- Telesphore G. Lortie (1953–1959)
- J. Neil O'Donnell (1960–1965)
- Eric Acland (1965–1967)
- Edgar Whelan (1967–1970)
- Ernest Lattion (1970–1975)
- Neil O'Donnell (1975–1979)
- Patrick T. Asselin (1979–1983)
- Constance Provost (1983–1995)
- Marc Croteau (1995–2001)

==== List of mayors of Deschênes (1920-1974) ====
- John Routliffe (1920–1930)
- Israël Gravelle (1930–1937)
- Alexandre Madaire (1937–1944)
- Harry Rosenes (1944–1946)
- Jean Côté (1946–1951)
- Émilien Clairmont (1951–1953)
- Jean B. Côté (1953–1959)
- René Paulin (1959–1965)
- Jean-Paul Poirier (1965–1969)
- Kenneth Lloyd (1969–1973)
- Jean-Paul Poirier (1973–1974)

==== List of mayors of Lucerne (1879-1974) ====
- William McKay Wright (1879–1881)
- Claudius Maxwell (1881–1887)
- William Simmons (1887–1892)
- Robert Hugues Conroy (1892–1905)
- Samuel H. Edey (1905–1909)
- William H. McConnell (1909–1912)
- Samuel Stewart (1912–1919)
- William H. McConnell (1919–1920)
- Samuel Arbuckle (1920)
- William Maxwell (1921–1931)
- Frederick Ferris (1931–1948)
- Arthur Grimes (1948–1949)
- Hibbert Vipond (1949–1952)
- Thomas C. Radmore (1952–1957)
- Thomas Graham Mayburry (1957–1961)
- Jules Loeb (1961–1963)
- Gaston Isabelle (1963–1966)
- Gilbert W. Nadeau (1966–1967)
- Raymond Roger (1967–1969)
- Maurice Beaulieu (1969–1971)
- Denis Roberge (1971–1973)
- Henri Laflamme (1973–1974)

Note: From 1879 to November 1964, this area was known as South Hull.

== Education ==
=== English school board ===
The Western Québec School Board provides English and French immersion education to primary and secondary students.

=== French school board ===
The Commission scolaire des portages de l'Outaouais provides French education to primary and secondary students.

=== Primary schools ===
- South Hull: Immersion primary school, located in Lakeview Terrace.
- École Du Marais: A francophone primary school, located on the corner of Marigot street and boulevard Du Plateau. Inaugurated in 2011 for the growing community, it teaches kindergarten to grade 6.
- Rapides Deschênes: A francophone primary school, located on Vanier road, just south of Lakeview Terrace. Occupying three buildings, it teaches school from kindergarten to grade 6. The schools were originally known as St George (grades 1 and 2), Notre Dame (for girls, with a convent attached) and St Medard (for boys). The schools had English and French classes in the 1950s and 1960s.
- Vieux-Verger: A francophone primary school, located on Wilfrid-Lavigne boulevard. It teaches school from kindergarten to grade 6. Before the school was built, an orchard was present on that lot, which inspired the name for the school, which is French for "Old Orchard".
- Euclide-Lanthier: A francophone primary school, located on Elizabeth street. It teaches kindergarten to grade 6.
- Trois-Portages: A francophone primary school, located on Broad street, in the lot next to École secondaire Grande-Rivière. It teaches kindergarten to grade 6.
- École du Village: A francophone primary school divided into two separate buildings: Limoges and St-Paul. It teaches kindergarten through 6. Limoges (kindergarten to grade 3) is located on Symmes. St-Paul (grades 4 to 6) is located on Dalhousie.
- Lord Aylmer School : Renamed after the amalgamation of Saint Mark's Elementary and Aylmer Elementary. The school has two campuses (located only across the street from each other). The former St. Mark's (known as the "Junior Campus") teaches students from kindergarten to grade 3. Aylmer Elementary (the "Senior Campus") teaches grades 4 to 6. Lord Aylmer Elementary has a program in English and French immersion. Located on Frank Robinson street.(Historical note: Aylmer Elementary was previously Aylmer High School, an English-language secondary school which was de-commissioned with the opening of the Philemon Wright High School in Hull in 1969.)
- École de la Forêt: A francophone primary school, located on Avenue du Bois-Franc. It teaches kindergarten to grade 6.
- École des Tournesols: A francophone primary school, located on Rue de la Fabrique. It teaches kindergarten to grade 6.
- Montessori de l'Outaouais: Based on the Montessori theory of education, this French preschool and kindergarten is thirty years old. It is located at 161 Principale Street.

=== Secondary schools ===
École secondaire Grande-Rivière: a francophone high school, located on Broad street, this school teaches well over 2000 students, and supports an additional 100+ staff members, including teachers, administrators, janitors, and other service personnel. It is the largest secondary school in the sector. It sports a standard programme, a musical concentration programme, an artistic concentration programme, an IB Middle Years Programme, the International Programme (P.E.I), and several support programmes for students in difficult situations. It also has a small community of highly active students who participate in the organization of school activities.

Other secondary schools are Symmes Junior High School (grades 7 and 8) and the recently constructed École secondaire D'Arcy McGee High School (grades 9, 10 and 11), both located on Blvd. du Plateau, this is because they are joined, making the school grades 7–11.

== Notable Aylmer individuals ==
- Meredith Henderson: Gemini Award-winning actress, now living in Los Angeles, CA
- Paul and Isabelle Duchesnay
- Polly Shannon: actress now living in Hollywood, CA.
- Dean DeBlois
- Merlin Bronques
- Charlie Major: born in Aylmer
- Matthiew Klinck: Hollywood film director, born in Aylmer
- Larry Archambeault: born in Aylmer, former hockey player
- Yannick Lupien: Olympic swimmer (2000, 2004), won silver medal World aquatic Montreal 2005
- Matthew Barnaby: former NHL player
- Peter Jennings: former US network news anchor. Raised in Aylmer.
- Ron Omara: CFL Player
- Marc Parent, Scott Milks and March Cesare: musicians form 1980s music group Eight Seconds.
- Olivier Hanlan: NBA Player
- Maxim Tissot: professional soccer player
- Caroline Calvé: Olympic snowboarder
- Caroline Monnet: contemporary artist and filmmaker

== Neighbourhoods ==
- Aylmer Nord
- Aylmer Park
- Champlain Park
- Connaught Gardens/Lucerne
- Des Cèdres
- Deschênes (DCHB)
- Glenwood/Vieux Moulin
- Jardins Lavigne
- La Seigneurie
- Lakeview Terrace
- Marina
- McCleod
- Mountain View
- Projet Pilon
- Queen's Park
- Rivermead
- Vieux Aylmer
- Wychwood

== See also ==
- List of former cities in Quebec
- Municipal reorganization in Quebec
- Pontiac Pacific Junction Railway
