= James Bailie =

Northern Ireland politician (1890–1967)

Member of the Senate of Northern Ireland
- In office 1955–1967

Deputy Speaker of the Senate of Northern Ireland
- In office 1962–1963

Personal details
- Born: 1890
- Died: 1967 (aged 76–77)
- Party: Ulster Unionist
- Occupation: Domestic engineer; Foundry owner

James Bailie (1890–1967) was a unionist politician in Northern Ireland.

Bailie worked as a domestic engineer and ran a foundry that produced ironworks in Ballymena. He joined the Ulster Unionist Party and served on various public boards before being elected to the Senate of Northern Ireland in 1955, serving until his death in 1967. From 1962 to 1963, he was a Deputy Speaker of the Senate.
