= Baillie (surname) =

Baillie is a surname of Scottish origin. Notable people with the surname include:

- Baillie of Jerviswood (died 1684), Scottish conspirator
- Adam Baillie (born 1982), Australian politician
- Adrian Baillie (1898–1947), 6th Baronet, British politician
- Albert Baillie (1864–1955), Anglican clergyman
- Alec Baillie (died 2020), American bassist
- Alexander Baillie (born 1956), English cellist
- Allan Baillie (born 1943), Australian writer
- Anna Baillie (1864–1958), British nurse
- Augustus Baillie (1861–1939), British soldier and lawyer
- Bill Baillie (1934–2018), New Zealand athlete
- Bruce Baillie (1931–2020), American film director
- Caroline Baillie, British materials scientist and academic at the University of San Diego
- Charles Baillie, several people
- Chris Baillie (hurdler) (born 1981), Scottish athlete
- Chris Baillie (politician) (born 1961 or 1962), New Zealand politician
- Cuthbert Baillie (died 1514), Treasurer of Scotland
- David Baillie (comics) (born 1977), Scottish writer and illustrator
- David Baillie (footballer) (1905–1967), English footballer
- Donald Macpherson Baillie (1887–1954), Scottish theologian, ecumenist, and parish minister
- Doug Baillie (1937–2022), Scottish footballer and sportswriter
- Edmund J. Baillie (1851–1896), Welsh businessman and horticulturist
- Evan Baillie (1741–1835), British West Indies merchant, landowner and Whig politician
- Sir Frank Wilton Baillie (1875–1921), Canadian industrialist
- Gawaine Baillie (1934–2003), 7th Baronet, amateur motor racing driver, engineer, industrialist, stamp collector
- Lady Grisell Baillie (1822–1891), first woman to be created a Deaconess in the Church of Scotland
- Lady Grizel Baillie (1665–1746), Scottish songwriter
- Henry Baillie (1803–1885), British Conservative politician
- Isobel Baillie (1895–1983), Scottish soprano
- Jackie Baillie (born 1964), Labour Member of the Scottish Parliament for the Dumbarton constituency
- James Baillie, several people
- Jamie Baillie (born 1966), Canadian politician
- Joanna Baillie (1762–1851), Scottish poet and dramatist
- Joe Baillie (1929–1966), Scottish footballer
- John Baillie, several people
- Jonathan Baillie (born 1985), Scottish footballer
- Martha Baillie (born 1960), Canadian poet and novelist
- Marianne Baillie (1788–1831), née Wathen, traveller and verse-writer
- Matthew Baillie (1761–1823), Scottish physician and pathologist
- Michael Baillie, 3rd Baron Burton (1924–2013), British peer
- Mike Baillie (1944–2023), Professor of Palaeoecology at Queen's University of Belfast
- Nellie Lisa Baillie, 2nd Baroness Burton (1873–1962), British aristocrat
- Olive, Lady Baillie (1899–1974), Anglo-American heiress
- Ray Baillie (1935–2015), Canadian football player
- Robert Baillie (1602–1662), Scottish divine and historical writer
- Steven Baillie, American art director and photographer
- Thomas Baillie, several people
- Tim Baillie (born 1979), British slalom canoeist
- William Baillie, several people

== See also ==
- Baillie baronets
- Hamilton-Baillie
- Bailey (surname)
- Bailie (given name)
- Bailie (surname)
