= Hundred Guilder Print =

Print by Rembrandt

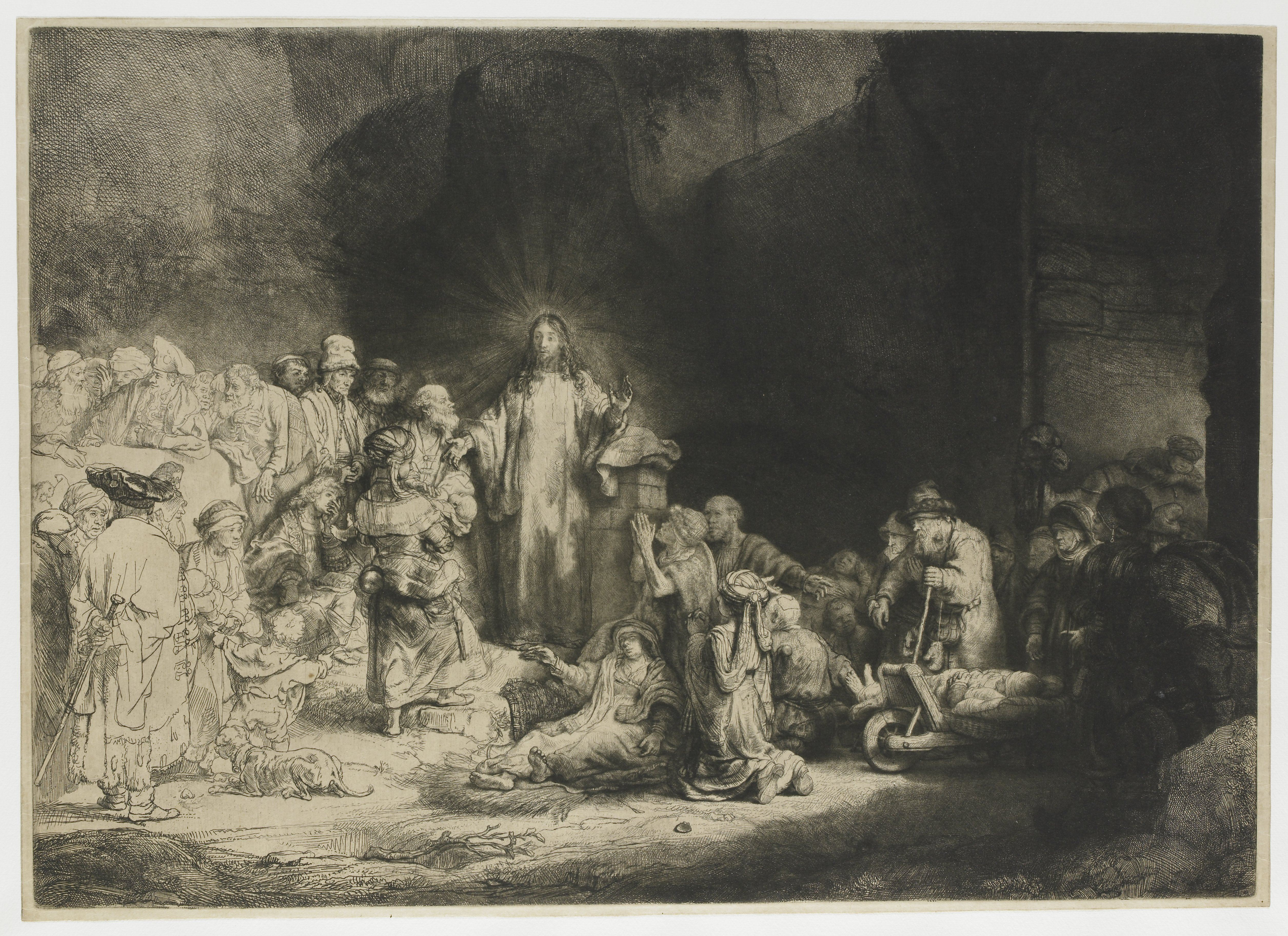
- Artist: Rembrandt
- Year: c.1647-1649
- Dimensions: 27.8 cm × 38.8 cm (10.9 in × 15.3 in)
- Location: The Frick Collection, Amsterdam Museum

The Hundred Guilder Print is an etching with drypoint by Rembrandt, measuring 278 x 388 mm (platemark). The etching's popular name derives from the large sum of money supposedly charged for it. It is also called Christ healing the sick, Christ with the Sick around Him, Receiving Little Children, or Christ preaching, since the print depicts multiple events from Matthew 19 in the New Testament, including Christ healing the sick, debating with scholars and calling on children to come to him. The rich young man mentioned in the chapter is leaving through the gateway on the right.

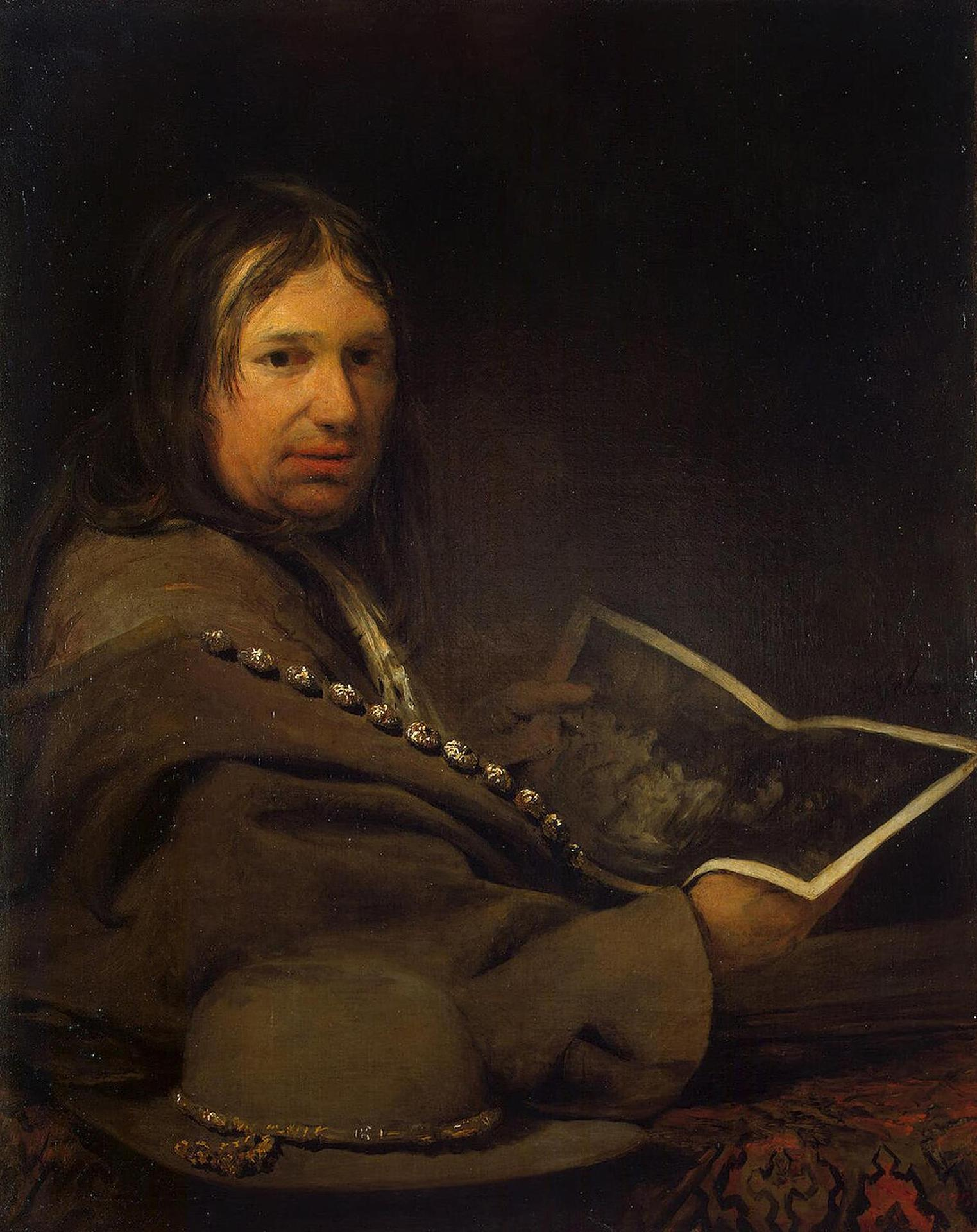
Aert de Gelder, a Rembrandt pupil, portrayed himself holding this print, c. 1700.

Unusually, especially for such an ambitious work, Rembrandt did not sign it, and some parts of it seem "somewhat unresolved". The complexity of different techniques and "variety of styles" in the Hundred Guilder Print have suggested to some art historians that Rembrandt worked on it over a long period in the 1640s, and it was the "critical work in the middle of his career", from which his final etching style began to emerge. But a study of the watermarks suggests that the surviving impressions from Rembrandt's lifetime were only pulled "from around 1647–48". Although the exact date cannot be confirmed, the completion of the painting could be narrowed down to 1649.

Although the print only survives in two states, the first very rare, evidence of much reworking can be seen, and several drawings survive for elements of it. The differences between the two states are small, but different papers and inking can create a wide range of different effects between individual impressions (copies).

Wieseman describes the etching as a "technical tour de force, incorporating an enormous diversity of printmaking styles and techniques": the group of figures at the left side of the print, for example, is deftly indicated with a minimum of lightly bitten lines; in contrast, the evocative richness of the blacks and the depth of tone in the right half of the print represents Rembrandt's experimental competition with the newly discovered mezzotint technique.

== Description ==
Jesus occupies the central position; he is the centre around which everything revolves. In the background right above Jesus, there is a dark bell-shaped alcove that makes him stand out. The aureole around his head points to his divinity. His appearance radiates dignity, but also vulnerability and a certain fragility. He spreads out his arms in a welcoming gesture. His hands, however, also make the traditional gesture of Christ as judge that is often see in paintings of the Last Judgment. The hand pointing up sends people to heaven (usually his right hand), while the hand pointing down directs others to hell (usually his left hand). It is notable that the hands are reversed here. This means that the Hundred Guilder Print contains an allusion to the Last Judgment. The group of seven disciples (three barely visible) stands close to Jesus, at his own right hand.

Three of them have their gaze fixed upon Jesus. They all look pensive, while their reaction to Jesus' words and deeds in this chapter can be described as critical. The disciple closest to Jesus can be identified as Peter based on the way he is commonly portrayed. With his right hand he tries to stop the woman who is approaching Jesus with a baby in her arms. She takes the decisive step as she brings her baby up to Jesus. This may entail an allusion to child baptism, a point of contention also in Rembrandt's time. Behind her a toddler is pulled along his mothers side. She carries another baby in her arms as well. This mother is still hesitating while the child points to Jesus, just as Jesus holds the child up as an example to the viewer. Behind the boy a dog is lying on the ground. In the 17th century a dog usually symbolized faithfulness. This may allude to the scripture by Matthew 15:26–28. One has a cap over his ears he does not want to hear Jesus's words. Another one has his cap not only over his ears but also over his eyes. At the front of this little group and placed farthest away from Jesus a man is standing prominently with his back to the viewer. He wears an over-sized beret. With his hands clasped behind his back and looking away even his foot points away, he seems arrogantly to avoid Jesus' gaze. There is a young man in fancy garments who is located next to a woman of the same stature with a baby in her arms. His richly worked clothing, his well-groomed hair, and his stylish boots indicate a life of comfort. Dejected, he sits down, lost deep in thought. A camel entering the gate at the extreme right of the print parallel to the young man seems to link him directly to verse 24.

Underscoring this, a man seems to be trying to grab the beast in order hitch a ride on it. the meaning of this chapter is made manifest in how Jesus stands there. Perhaps the most striking reversal of all: Jesus' hands are the opposite of their usual portrayal in the Last Judgment. The acquitting hand is on the left, significantly enough the side of the poor in spirit. The condemning hand is on the right, the side we might characterize as that of the rich in spirit. Yet it is also with this hand that Jesus pushes away Peter who wants to prevent the woman with child to come to him. Moreover, Jesus' acquitting hand is placed in the very center of the composition. Grace is made central in this print.

== History ==
Rembrandt's Hundred Guilder print, as it has become known, has been famous since his own day for the extraordinarily high price it fetched. A letter to Carolus van den Bosch, the Bishop of Bruges, in 1654, only a few years after it was completed, claimed that "in Holland [it] has been sold various times for 100 guilders and more", saying it was "very fine and lovely, but ought to cost 30 guilders".

Rembrandt may have worked on the Hundred Guilder print in stages throughout the 1640s, and it was a critical piece of work in the middle of his career from which his final etching style began to emerge. Many consider this print the apotheosis of Rembrandt's activity in etching. In one frame, Rembrandt illustrates no fewer than four moments from chapter nineteen of the Gospel of Saint Matthew. Although the exact date cannot be confirmed, the completion of the painting could be narrowed down to 1649. The print only survives in two states, but evidence of much reworking can be seen in both states and many drawings survive for elements of it.

In this print, Rembrandt combines life study, close reading of gospel passages, and his mastery of the medium. Various preparatory studies indicate how carefully Rembrandt worked out individual figures and how he finalized the entire composition by the time it was first printed. Wieseman describes the etching as a technical tour de force, incorporating an enormous diversity of styles and techniques used in printmaking. The group of figures at the left side of the print for example, is deftly indicated with a minimum of lightly bitten lines; in contrast, the evocative richness of the blacks and the depth of tone in the right half of the print represents Rembrandt's experimental competition with the newly discovered mezzotint technique

In the decade following 1642, Rembrandt's production changed in several ways. His output of paintings diminished drastically, and the few paintings he made varied in subject, size, and style. Moreover, he produced no painted portraits, a fact that can be interpreted in two ways: either he did not receive any portrait commissions during that period or he did not accept such commissions for the decade. At the same time, he embarked on a number of extremely ambitious etchings, such as the portrait (1647) of his friend Jan Six and especially the Hundred Guilder print.

== Impact ==
=== Jan Steen ===
During the early 1650s, Jan Steen (1626–1679) appropriated aspects of Rembrandt's Hundred Guilder print, creating one of the earliest visual responses to this masterwork. Steen transformed somber and ill figures from the Hundred Guilder print into raucously playful, joking, or drunk participants in the farce of a marriage ritual. In transforming the serious biblical subject into a comic village wedding, Steen departed from the general reverential regard for the print and demonstrated his respectful rivalry with Rembrandt.

=== The Baillie print ===
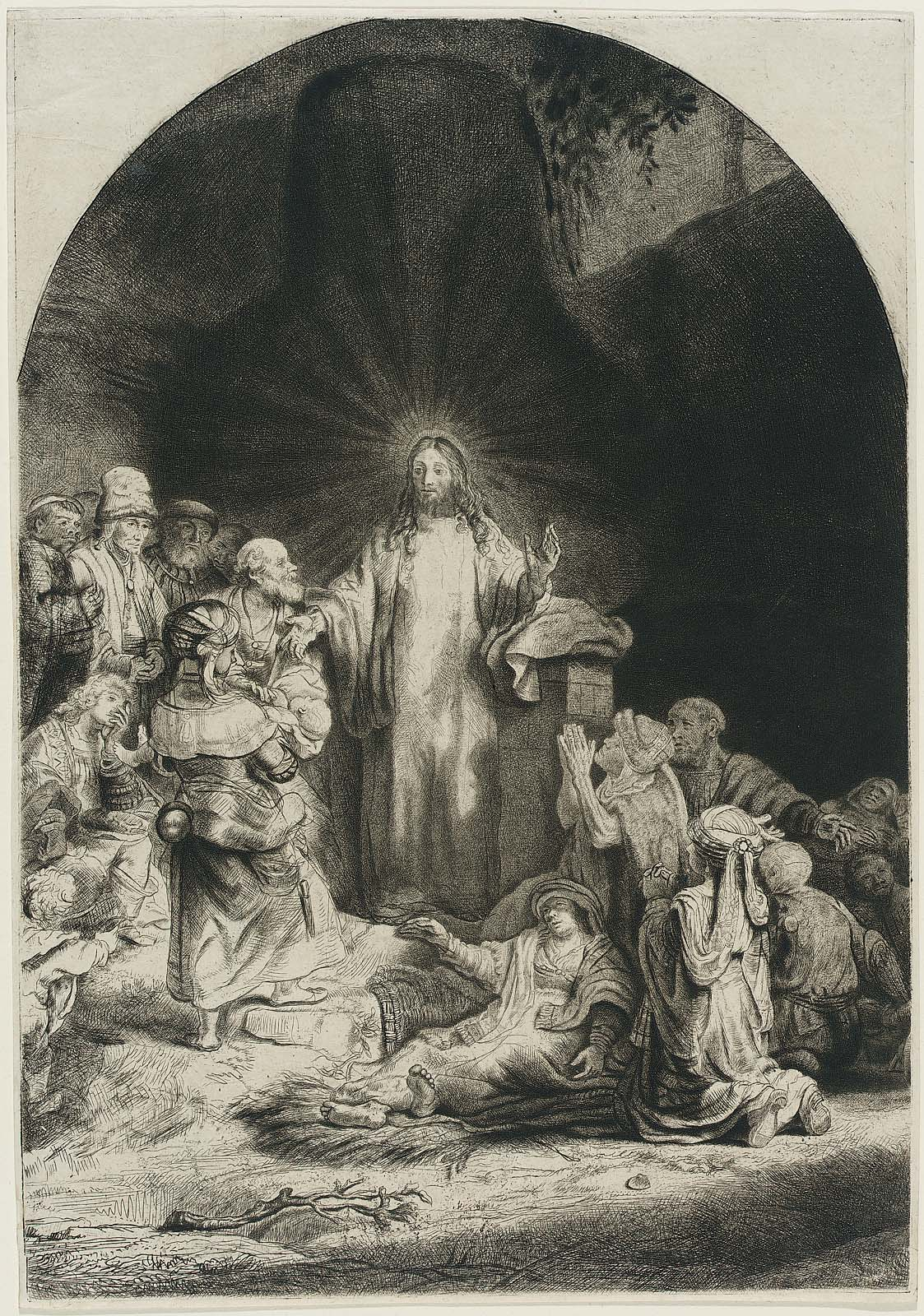
Baillie's cut-down reworking

Around 1775, Captain William Baillie printed a 100 impression edition of an extensively re-worked, by his own hand, version of Rembrandt's original copper plate. Baillie's earliest known print is a portrait of John Golding (1753), and he occasionally produced military-themed prints etched from his own original paintings. More typically, however, he reproduced the work of seventeenth-century Dutch and Flemish masters in his own or aristocratic collections, specialising in Rembrandt van Rijn.

He acquired the plate, already worn down by repeated printings, from the painter and engraver John Greenwood. As an engraver himself, Baillie attempted to restore the work, but his effort was considered "hard and unfeeling, lacking all the subtleties of Rembrandt's own work". After his edition, Baillie cut the plate into four pieces, reworked them further, and had them printed as separate images. To the reduced center fragment with Christ, he added the frame of an arch.

== Etching and printmaking ==
Rembrandt made about 300 etchings and drypoint between about 1626 and 1665. The Hundred Guilder print was created drypoint and etching with Japan paper as the main material for the print. Rembrandt was fascinated with subjects from the Old and New Testaments and, as in Abraham and Isaac, he enjoyed revealing realistic human emotion and narrative detail inspired by these stories which lead to the origin of the Hundred Guilder Print. Landscapes were another favorite print subject of Rembrandt. The Three Trees in which he evoked the typically blustery and rainy Dutch weather, is the most intensely dramatic of these works. By the 1650s, Rembrandt began to treat the printing plate much like a canvas leaving some ink or ink tone on the surface of the plate in order to create “painted” impressions of prints in which each impression would look different depending on the way he had inked the plate.Rembrandt owned a large collection of prints by such earlier masters as Albrecht Dürer, Lucas van Leyden, and Antonio Tempesta, and he often drew inspiration from their work.

By the 1650s, Rembrandt began to treat the printing plate much like a canvas leaving some ink or tone on the surface of the plate in order to create "painted" impressions of prints in which each impression would look different depending on the way he had inked the plate. The Entombment (1654) was printed in the first state without plate tone so that only the etched lines are visible. In the second state, however, he produced subtle, moody impressions of the same image by leaving a good deal of ink on the surface of the printing plate and then wiping it away in certain areas to create highlights, as he did on the body of Christ and a few of the figures around him in the Metropolitan Museum's impression. Rembrandt often dramatically reworked his late prints, creating almost entirely new visions of a subject with each state. Since he preserved so many stages of his working process, the present-day viewer can in a certain sense bear witness to it.

== Some locations ==
While the number of original impressions (copies) printed by Rembrandt and other subsequent owners of the plate is unknown, the Hundred Guilder Print is not rare by the standards of Rembrandt prints, though the quality of the impressions varies considerably. Many copies can be seen in print rooms, including:

- British Museum
- Frick Collection
- Museum of Fine Arts, Boston including Biallie prints
- Metropolitan Museum of Art
- Oberlin College, Allen Memorial Art Museum
- Rijksmuseum

== See also ==
- List of drawings by Rembrandt
- List of etchings by Rembrandt
