= David Bailey (disambiguation) =

David Bailey (born 1938) is an English photographer.

David Bailey may also refer to:

== In arts and media ==
- David Bailey (actor) (1933–2004), American actor
- David M. Bailey (1966–2010), Christian singer-songwriter
- Dave Bailey (musician) (1926–2023), American jazz drummer
- David A. Bailey (born 1961), British Afro-Caribbean curator, photographer and writer
- David Bailey (writer), British editor and science fiction author
- Dave Hullfish Bailey (born 1963), American sculptor

== In sport ==
- David Bailey (motorcyclist) (born 1961), American racer
- Homer Bailey (David Dewitt Bailey, Jr., born 1986), baseball player
- David Bailey (rugby league) (born 1969), New Zealand rugby league footballer
- David Bailey (cricketer, born 1943), English cricketer
- David Bailey (cricketer, born 1944), English cricketer
- David Bailey (basketball) (born 1981), American basketball player
- David Bailey (American football) (born 2003), American football player

== In other fields ==
- David Bailey (economist) (born 1966), British academic and commentator
- David H. Bailey (mathematician) (born 1948), mathematician and computer scientist
- David Bailey (diplomat) (1830–1896), US consul and consul general in China
- David Bailey (New Jersey politician) (born 1967), member of the New Jersey General Assembly
- Jack Bailey (Georgia politician) (David Jackson Bailey, 1812–1897), American politician
- David Bailey (militia officer) (1801–1854), American militia officer in the Illinois Militia
- David Bailey (priest) (born 1952), Archdeacon of Bolton
- David Bailey (pharmacologist) (1945–2022), Canadian distance runner and medical researcher
- David Earle Bailey (1940–2024), bishop in the Episcopal Church

== Fictional characters ==
- Lieutenant Dave Bailey, a character in the Star Trek episode "The Corbomite Maneuver"

== See also ==
- David Bailly (1584–1657), Dutch Golden Age painter
- David Baillie (disambiguation)
