= Jeremy Gilbert-Rolfe =

British-American painter (1945–2024)

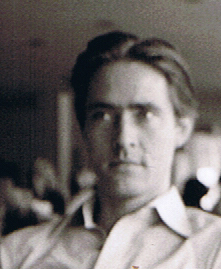
- Gilbert-Rolfe in 1978
- Born: 4 August 1945; Tunbridge Wells, England
- Died: 14 August 2024 (aged 79); Gainesville, Florida, U.S.
- Known for: Painting, Art criticism
- Movement: Geometric abstraction
- Website: www.jeremygilbert-rolfe.com

Jeremy Gilbert-Rolfe (4 August 1945 – 14 August 2024) was a British-born American painter, art critic, art theorist, and educator, born in Royal Tunbridge Wells, England. In 1968, he moved to the United States, where he remained.

Gilbert-Rolfe held several degrees, including a National Diploma in Painting from Tunbridge Wells School of Art (1965), an ATC from the London University Institute of Education (1967), and an MFA from Florida State University (1970). His work is in the permanent collections of the Albright-Knox Gallery of Art, Buffalo, NY; The Getty Study Center, Los Angeles; the Hammer Museum, Los Angeles; the Los Angeles County Museum of Art; the Museum of Contemporary Art, Los Angeles; the Museum of Contemporary Art, North Miami; the Frederick R. Weisman Foundation in Los Angeles and Minneapolis; the Whitney Museum of American Art, New York; and other public, corporate and private collections.

Starting out in Artforum, in 1973, he wrote something at least once for most of the art magazines over the years, and more often for Critical Inquiry and Bomb Magazine. A founding editor of October (journal), with Rosalind Krauss, Annette Michelson and Lucio Pozzi (who withdrew before the first issue was published,) Gilbert-Rolfe resigned from the journal after the third issue.

Gilbert-Rolfe died in Gainesville, Florida, on 14 August 2024, at the age of 79. He has two sons, Cyrus Gilbert-Rolfe and Cedric Gilbert-Rolfe.

== Painting ==
Gilbert-Rolfe had shown in New York fairly regularly from 1970, and sporadically elsewhere. Regarding the general consensus that describes his work as Geometric abstraction, Gilbert-Rolfe said he wishes people would think about what he does with the category rather than how his work fits into it. He said he went to an exhibition at the Tate Gallery in London in 1963 to see the Pop Art that was in it but what caught his attention instead, causing him to decide he needed to go to America, were the paintings of the New York School and especially and specifically Barnett Newman's Vir Heroicus Sublimis (1951). The space in it felt as active as the space in Howard Hawks' Red River, which had entered his imagination when he was a child.

Rachel Kushner discussed Gilbert-Rolfe's indebtedness to Newman and Hawks and much else, going on to say that she made an "automatic and instinctive" association of his painting Hottest Part of the Day (2001) with a poem of Sappho's, and that it is her "sense that Gilbert-Rolfe had some uncanny mesh with feminine sensibilities. Gilbert-Rolfe said that "his paintings are about complexity and as such have come to be about logic as much as anything else. Not logic as in philosophy, logic as in music, where one talks of it making sense but does not mean it provides a riddle and its answer. I want the work to interact with the viewer, to take place in the space around itself and between itself and the person looking at it, and to hold the attention for some time." Gilbert-Rolfe has also said that seriousness is generally identified with terror, "but I want to identify it with questions of the formless... Art has to put you in touch with something that's not manageable.... (but) it's time to get rid of ... tough-guy rhetoric about the sublime. Among other things, it would permit us to get closer to the sublime or sublimes that tough guys are too scared to touch." As Kushner puts it, "Gilbert-Rolfe ... lays out his ante, but never knows where a painting will go."

In 2010 Gilbert-Rolfe and Rebecca Norton began to work together as the collaboration Awkward x 2, making paintings together and also writing occasional blogs. Awkward has shown in Brooklyn, Chicago and Louisville to date.

== Art Criticism and Theory ==
Gilbert-Rolfe wrote about art and related topics, including poetry, fiction, fashion, with particular regard to its interaction with photography, digital technology, and the general state of things in art and how the present situation seems to have emerged.

His publications include two anthologies of his essays, a book about Frank Gehry's architecture co-authored with the architect, Beauty and the Contemporary Sublime, and other essays and reviews.

Beauty and the Contemporary Sublime reformulates the traditional definition of the differential relationship between beauty and the sublime, in which beauty is a sign of the passive and feminine and the sublime of the active and male—heroic or terrifying depending on one's perspective, or of course both. In Gilbert-Rolfe's version Winckelmann's masculine active becomes instead androgynous transitivity, while intransitivity replaces passivity as a still entirely feminine characteristic, the feminine as intransitivity being a sign or force that stands for, or embodies, power as a kind of powerlessness. As well as redefining the differential, Beauty and the Contemporary Sublime's argument also relocates the sublime from nature to technology, and with it subjectivity, from wherever it imagined itself to be to within techno-capitalism.

Here and elsewhere Gilbert-Rolfe suggests that techno-capitalism and the subjectivity that accompanies it are largely made out of all that Martin Heidegger warns against and denounces in his post-war essays on technology, for example the telephone's capacity to sever the mutual dependence of space and time. He has returned to some aspects of this argument in two essays in particular.

== Honors ==
For painting, Gilbert-Rolfe has been honored by two National Endowment for the Arts fellowships (1979, 1989) a Guggenheim Foundation Fellowship (1997), The Francis Greenberger Award (2001) and a Pollock-Krasner Fellowship (2017). He was awarded an NEA fellowship in Art criticism in 1974 and was the 1998 recipient of the College Art Association's Frank Jewett Mather Award for Art and Architectural Criticism.

== Teaching ==
In 2015, Gilbert-Rolfe retired as a teacher from Art Center College of Design and received the title Professor/Chair Emeritus. He had been working there since 1986 after being hired to develop an MFA program for the school. Prior to that, he worked as an instructor at the Art Department of Florida State University in 1971, a lecturer at the Visual Arts Program of Princeton University in 1978, a Visiting Lecturer at the Art Department of Queens College, City University of New York in 1977, and as a lecturer at the Departments of Art and Art History of Parsons School of Design from 1978 to 1980. He also served as a lecturer at the Art Department of California Institute of the Arts in 1986 and as a Graduate Studies teacher at Art Center College of Design from 1986 to 2015. He was appointed chair from 2003 to 2014. In addition, he worked as a Visiting Lecturer at Yale University School of Architecture from 1987 to 1989. Lastly, since 1999, he was a Visiting Tutor at the Royal Academy Schools in London, teaching painting.

Some of his most famous students while teaching at Art Center include: Lynn Aldrich, Lisa Anne Auerbach, Dave Hullfish Bailey, Aaron Curry, Sharon Lockhart, Steve Roden, Sterling Ruby, Frances Stark, Jennifer Steinkamp, Diana Thater, Pae White, and Jennifer West.

== Bibliography ==
- Gilbert-Rolfe, J. (1986). Immanence and contradiction: Recent essays on the artistic device. Out of London Press.
- Gilbert-Rolfe, J. (1995). Beyond piety: Critical essays on the visual arts, 1986-1993. Cambridge University Press.
- Gilbert-Rolfe, J. (1996). Das Schöne und das Erhabene von heute [The beautiful and the sublime today]. Merve Verlag.
- Gilbert-Rolfe, J. (2000). Beauty and the contemporary sublime. Allworth Press.
- Gilbert-Rolfe, J. (2001). Frank Gehry, the city and music. Harvey Miller.
- Butler, R. (2012). Butler, R. (ed.). Art after deconstruction: Jeremy Gilbert-Rolfe. Institute of Modern Art.
