= David Baillie =

David Baillie may refer to:

- David Baillie (comics) (born 1977), Scottish comic writer and artist
- David Baillie (footballer) (1905–1967), English football player

== See also ==
- David Bailey (disambiguation)
- David Bailly (1584–1657), Dutch Golden Age painter
