= Lynn Aldrich =

American sculptor

- Born: 1944 (age 81–82); Bryan, Texas, United States
- Education: Art Center College of Design; California State University, Northridge; University of North Carolina, Chapel Hill
- Known for: Sculpture, installation, public art
- Awards: Guggenheim Fellowship, J. Paul Getty Trust, City of Los Angeles (COLA)
- Website: Lynn Aldrich

Lynn Aldrich, Breaker, steel, wood, fiberglass, garden hoses, 36" x 32" x 50", 1999. Collection of Los Angeles County Museum of Art.

Lynn Aldrich (born 1944) is an American sculptor whose art draws from both high and low cultural influences and materials. Reviews have characterized her work variously as "slyly Minimalist meditations" on color, light and space and whimsical "Home Depot Pop" that reveals and critiques the visual, formal and material excesses of unbridled consumption. Leah Ollman and Claudine Ise of the Los Angeles Times term Aldrich's art, respectively, a "consumerist spin on the assemblage tradition" and a "witty brand of kitchen-sink Conceptualism" LA Weekly's Doug Harvey calls her "one of the most under-recognized sculptors in L.A.," whose hallmarks are the poetic transformation of found materials, formal inventiveness and restless eclecticism.

Aldrich has exhibited at venues including the Museum of Contemporary Art, Los Angeles (MOCA), Los Angeles County Museum of Art (LACMA), Hammer Museum and Santa Monica Museum of Art. She received a Guggenheim Fellowship in 2014 and her work belongs to the public art collections of LACMA, MOCA and the Portland Art Museum, among others. She lives and works in the Los Angeles area.

== Early life and career ==
Aldrich was born in Bryan, Texas into a military family that moved throughout the United States. Her father was a veterinary pathologist at the Armed Forces Institute of Pathology and National Zoo (Washington, DC) and science was an influence on her early interests and subsequent art practice. She initially studied biology at Stetson University, working as a virology lab assistant at Smith, Kline & French Laboratories (Philadelphia) during college summers. After shifting to English literature, she graduated from University of North Carolina, Chapel Hill (BA, 1966), where she met future husband, Michael Aldrich. They settled in Glendale, California in 1970 and raised three sons, Jack, Matthew, and Daniel.

Aldrich explored a longstanding interest in art through painting and drawing classes at Glendale Community College, before studying art formally at California State University, Northridge (BA, 1984), with painter Marvin Harden, and at Art Center College of Design (MFA, 1986), with Jeremy Gilbert-Rolfe and Stephen Prina. In graduate school her working strategy emphasized materials, poetic allusions, three-dimensionality, shifts in scale, and reductive simplicity rather than a signature style; her influences included theorist Paul Virilio, artist/writer Robert Smithson, minimalists Donald Judd and Anne Truitt, and Californians Robert Irwin and Ed Ruscha.

After graduating, Aldrich exhibited widely, gaining notice for solo shows at Krygier/Landau, Sue Spaid Fine Art, Sandroni Rey and the Santa Monica Museum of Art in California, Cristinerose Gallery (New York) and Art Affairs Gallery (Amsterdam). She appeared in group shows at MOCA, Los Angeles Municipal Art Gallery, San Francisco Art Institute, P.P.O.W. (New York), and Portland Institute of Contemporary Art. In her later career, Carl Berg Gallery, Ben Maltz Gallery, Edward Cella Art+Architecture and DENK Gallery in Los Angeles and Jenkins Johnson Gallery (New York) have held solo exhibitions of Aldrich's work. She showed in group exhibitions at LACMA, MOCA Pacific Design Center, the Hammer Museum, San Jose Museum of Art and the Museum of Biblical Art in New York.

Aldrich has also taught art for roughly three decades, at Azusa Pacific University, Mars Hill Graduate School, Art Center College of Design, UCLA, Otis College of Art and Design, and Biola University.

Lynn Aldrich, Installation view from "Uncommon Objects" exhibition, Alyce de Roulet Williamson Gallery, Art Center College of Design, 2013. Pictured: Subdivision, 1990 (foreground, Collection MOCA Los Angeles); Worm Hole, 2003 (background, Collection of Cornell Fine Arts Museum, Winter Park, Florida); Shelf Life, 1992 (left wall); and Constellation, 2005/2013 (right wall).

== Work and reception ==
Aldrich incorporates a wide range of reference points in her work: the excess and spectacle of consumer culture and life in Los Angeles, art and literary influences, natural and celestial phenomena, and the Christian longing for revelation and transcendence. Curator Stephen Nowlin wrote that Aldrich's "heterogeneous works fuse and defuse Duchamp, pop, and minimalist influences, at once both respectfully and irreverently, measuring the dimensions of contemporary existence by their use of a consumer's palette." Critics often note resulting dualities in her work of banality and profundity, humorous spectacle and near-apocalyptic concern, scientific empiricism and faith.

Writers also emphasize Aldrich's method of playing artistic influences such as the Light and Space movement off of feminist strategies that inject everyday and domestic elements into fine art. She creates through processes of accumulation, repetition and placement that preserve the fundamental, recognizable nature of her source materials. The resulting works (and their punning titles) fuse, deconstruct or short-circuit form, function and meaning, creating physical and conceptual conundrums that reveal inherent metaphors and poetic essences in common objects.

=== Early work (1987–1996) ===
Early reviews describe Aldrich's work as "tartly conceptual," "stunningly formalist arrangements" that transform mundane artifacts into inventive visual metaphors. Meshing high-cultural minimalist form with the symbolism of mass-produced objects, works such as Subdivision (1990) or Shelf Life (1992) offered open-ended commentary on suburban domesticity, bourgeois humanism, and Modernist artistic practice. Subdivision featured sections of white picket fence arranged in a tight square formation that reviewers wrote signified both idealized suburban life and the claustrophobia or menace of pristine but squeezed living; Shelf Life featured stacks of food cans stripped of labels and wedged into a cupboard–like space, a meditation on obsolescence and mortality that Artforum likened visually to "a miniature Louise Nevelson in metal."

Critics often note a seamless merger of materials and concept in Aldrich's work. David Pagel described Waxing and Waning (1990)—two dozen strips of wax paper hanging between plastic dispensers on adjoining walls—as a graceful, "ghostly send-up of Robert Morris’s seminal felt pieces" alluding to the invisibility and power of domestic labor. The nested, resin-starched t-shirts of Shell Collection (1993–4) referenced the life cycle and natural forms such as tree rings, organic sheddings, or chrysalises; ARTnews's Suzanne Muchnic described such works as "unusual think pieces" whose light touch, wry humor, and ephemerality made their "ideas all the more memorable because they seem weightless."

Lynn Aldrich, Starting Over: Neo-Atlantis, Sponges, scrubbers, scouring pads, mop heads, brushes, plastic gloves, plungers, plumbing parts, 54" x 96" x 66", 2008.

=== Mature work (1997– ) ===
Reviews of Aldrich's major mid-career shows (1997–2008) suggest that she embraced a more assertive theatricality and sensual extravagance, mining consumer society's inadvertent beauty and revealing its perils. More whimsical, busier in its color, spatial and textural range, this work pushed further against minimalist restrictions concerning narrative and referential content, connecting to bodily and connotative associations and yielding overt philosophical and theological themes involving the earth and cosmos, society, and perception.

In Designer's Choice (Genesis) (1997; a floor grid of 125 faux-fur upholstery fabric swatches) and Worm Hole (2003; a tunnel of concrete casting tubes lined with a spectrum of faux-fur), Aldrich mixed low-end, near-garish consumer products, minimalist form and spiritual, scientific and metaphysical allusions. For Breaker (1999), Serpentarium (2002) and Drench (2008), she re-contextualized common garden hoses, using their aqua-to-green hues like pigments and conjuring allusions to water, poised snakes in paradise, suburban backyards, and abstract stripe paintings, among others; Breaker suggested a large, playfully menacing wave that rose from the floor like a Hokusai etching, its gleaming brass fittings resembling flecks of foam.

Several tragicomic works mimicked aquatic life with commercial products (often from the petroleum economy that threatens oceanic life), offering ironic, furtive critiques of consumer society. Sea Change (2003) is a Day-Glo diorama of undersea life constructed out of kitchen sponges and scrub pads; Starting Over: Neo-Atlantis uses cleaning products and toilet plungers to create a hyperbolic, synthetic undersea world whose riot of color rivals nature's chromatic range. Leah Ollman described such work as packing "a cartoon-like pow [that] resonate[s] powerfully—and whimsically—with both natural and unnatural worlds, the domestic sphere and global trauma."

Lynn Aldrich, Bouquet, steel downspouts, plastic flex elbow, exterior enamel, roof shingles, 28" x 19" x 12", 2009. Collection of Ahmanson Art Gallery, Irvine.

In the later-2000s, Aldrich explored metaphors involving water, thirst and longing in works using galvanized steel rain gutters whose meaning (and titles) balanced between formal object, suburban vernacular and metaphor. Silver Lining (2009) is a large array of shiny metal downspouts suspended at varying heights from above, their open insides painted shades of blue suggesting rain streaks, organ pipes, and the sacramental. In Desert Springs (2006–9) and Bouquet (2009), Aldrich upended the function of downspouts, arranging them like springs, cacti, animal eyestalks or bursting flowers. Hydra Hydrant (2010) features a trunk of white downspouts extending up in a twisting, lyrical multi-headed frenzy.

Writers suggest that Aldrich's work often brings the transcendent or majestic into intimate, common domestic space, as in My Niagara (2012) or Ray (2005/2013), a restrained, ceiling-to-floor, sunbeam-like sculpture of 150 unique colors of sewing threads suggesting illumination or epiphany. Her "Lampshade" wallworks (The Violet Hour (for T.S. Eliot); Constellation) likewise transform the mundane—cheap, partially filled lampshades affixed top-side to walls with subtly painted interiors—into celestial bowls of color and light that Susan Kandel said suggest "that revelation is available even, or maybe especially, at the 99-cent store." The installation Rosy Future (2015) re-imagined the awe and light of stained glass cathedral interiors, using drywall, tar paper and paint; Hermitage (2019), a fourteen-foot telescope-shaped column that viewers can enter, uses simple materials and low-tech construction to recreate the meditative, high-tech light effects of James Turrell's skyspaces.

== Public recognition ==
Aldrich has been awarded fellowships from the John S. Guggenheim Foundation (2014), J. Paul Getty Trust (2000), and City of Los Angeles (COLA, 1999). She has received a Communication Arts Design Award for Un/Common Objects: Lynn Aldrich (2014), a United States Artists Project Award (2014), a Christians in the Visual Arts (CIVA) Award (2007), and a Florence Biennale prize for sculpture (2001), among others.

Aldrich's work belongs to the public collections of LACMA, MOCA Los Angeles, New York Public Library, Portland Art Museum, Ahmanson Art Gallery (Irvine, CA), Calder Foundation, Cornell Fine Arts Museum (Winter Park, FL), and Westmont Ridley-Tree Museum of Art (Santa Barbara, CA). She has received public art commissions from the Los Angeles Metro Transit Authority (for Blue Line Oasis, 1994, Artesia Blue Line station) and the Armory Center for the Arts (for the temporary public installation, Three Founts, 2010).
