= Forest Marsh with Travellers on a Bank =

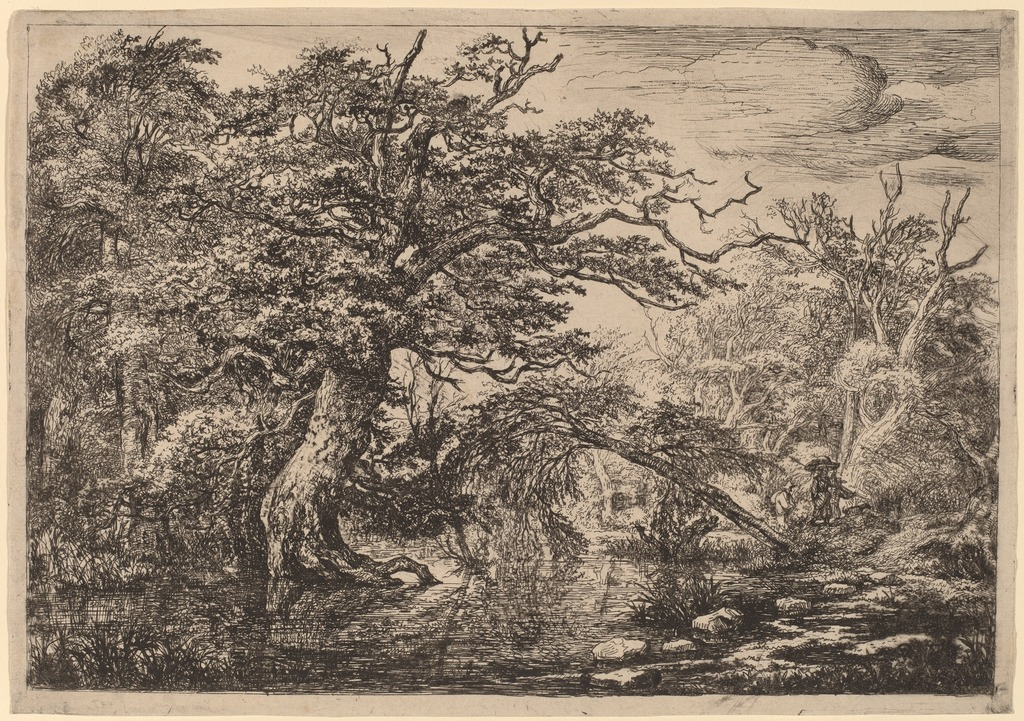
Forest Marsh with Travellers on a Bank

Forest Marsh with Travellers on a Bank (1640s-1650s), also known as The Travellers, is an etching by the Dutch Golden Age artist Jacob van Ruisdael. A few copies are known, including those in the collections of the British Museum, Metropolitan Museum of Art in New York, the Rijksprentenkabinet of the Rijksmuseum Amsterdam, and Museum Boymans-van Beuningen in Rotterdam.

The cumulus clouds in the late states of the etching have been added later and are not by Ruisdael himself.

Etching expert Georges Duplessis singled out The Travellers and The Cornfield as unrivalled illustrations of Ruisdael's genius. Ruisdael's pupil Meindert Hobbema painted two copies of this etching. One, dated 1662, is in the National Gallery of Victoria in Melbourne. A young John Constable said in 1797 that he wanted to copy the work; if he did, none of his copies have survived. When Constable died he owned four Ruisdael etchings, one of which was The Travellers.

The etching is catalogue number E13 in Slive's 2001 catalogue raisonné of Ruisdael, Hollstein 4.III and Bartsch I.313.4.

== See also ==
- List of paintings by Jacob van Ruisdael
