= Stephen Nowlin =

American curator/artist

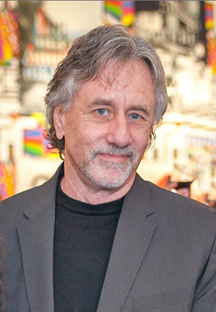
Stephen Nowlin, Pasadena, California, 2013

Stephen Nowlin is an American curator/artist whose practice superimposes art and science and is associated with the national ArtScience movement. He is a vice president at Art Center College of Design and founding director of the college's Alyce de Roulet Williamson Gallery.

== Early life and education ==
Stephen Nowlin was born in Glendale, California. He is the son of professional musicians Ray and Roberta Nowlin. Between 1966 and 1969, he lived in Berkeley, California and attended California College of Arts and Crafts (CCAC). In 1969 he left CCAC to work for Ladd & Kelsey Architects, Pasadena where he helped build a model of California Institute of the Arts (Calarts). He finished his undergraduate degree at Calarts during 1970–1971. Nowlin went on to receive a MFA from the Art Center College of Design.

== Career ==
Between 1969 and 1970, he worked in the Astro-Electronics Lab at California Institute of Technology (Caltech), drafting computer circuits for the Mount Wilson and Palomar Observatories and he participated in Caltech's E.A.T. (Experiments in Art & Technology) program, working with filmmaker and computer animator John Whitney. In 1970, Nowlin made the 3-minute film NNON, using early motion-graphics programming developed at Caltech. Between 1972 and 1976, he worked as a laboratory technician at the University of Southern California School of Medicine while pursuing studio art practice and experimentation. Nowlin joined the Art Center College of Design faculty following his graduation. In 1979 he organized a survey of paintings by pop-artist Wayne Theibaud with Fine Art Chair Laurence Dreiband. During 1979-1980 he exhibited his work at the Los Angeles Municipal Art Gallery, Los Angeles Institute of Contemporary Art (LAICA), and Topo Swope Gallery. During the 1980s and early 1990s, Nowlin curated over forty exhibitions including the first exhibition of work by 1930s-era photographer Horace Bristol; exhibitions of photojournalist Mary Ellen Mark, art directors Josef Muller-Brockmann and Helmut Krone; group exhibitions with Leo Castelli Gallery and John Berggruen Gallery; and solo exhibitions with David Hockney, Duane Michaels, Donald Judd, and Robert Venturi; curated solo exhibitions of recent work by James Rosenquist, Judy Pfaff, Sol LeWitt and Robert Morris. He also managed and designed the installation of large-scale sculptural works by David Smith, Alexander Calder, Donald Judd, Anthony Caro, Mark di Suvero, Richard Serra and Bruce Nauman. Between 1990 and 1992 he collaborated with architect Frederick Fisher and Partners, on Fisher's design for the Alyce de Roulet Williamson Gallery on Art Center's campus.

== Personal life ==
Nowlin is married to Anne Nowlin, née Hathaway, with whom he shares three children.

== Curatorial: ArtScience ==
- Digital Mediations (co-curated with Erkki Huhtamo, 1995);
- Jim Campbell (1997);
- Sara Roberts (1998);
- Charles and Ray Eames' Mathematica (2000);
- Jennifer Steinkamp, STIFFS (2000);
- Telematic Connections: The Virtual Embrace (traveling exhibition hosted at Williamson Gallery, 2000);
- Russell Crotty: The Universe from My Backyard (2001);
- Paul De Marinis (2001);
- Christian Moeller (2001);
- Situated Realities: Works from the Silicon Elsewhere (traveling exhibition hosted at Williamson Gallery, 2002);
- GHz: The Post-Analog Object in L.A. (co-curated with John David O'Brien, 2002);
- Paradise Now: Picturing the Genetic Revolution (traveling exhibition hosted at Williamson Gallery, 2003);
- NEURO (collaboration with the Center for Neuromorphic Systems Engineering, a Caltech NSF-funded lab exploring sensory systems in machines and biological organisms, 2003);
- Lita Albuquerque (site-specific installation at Caltech campus, 2004);
- Michael McMillen (site-specific installation at Caltech campus, 2004);
- EAR(th) (with Steve Roden/AnnMarie Thomas, 2004);
- Michael Naimark (2005);
- AxS: At the Intersection of Art & Science (co-curated with Jay Belloli);
- In the Dermisphere (2007);
- OBSERVE (collaboration with Caltech's Spitzer Science Center and NASA-JPL Spitzer Space Telescope, 2008);
- TOOLS (co-curated with John David O'Brien, 2009);
- ENERGY (2010);
- Things That Float (online exhibit for NASA Images, 2010);
- Hyperbolic: Reefs, Rubbish, and Reason (Institute for Figuring traveling exhibition curated by Margaret/Christine Wertheim hosted at Williamson Gallery, 2011);
- WORLDS (2011);
- The History of Space Photography (traveling exhibition curated by Jay Belloli, hosted at Williamson Gallery, 2012);
- PAGES (co-curated with John David O'Brien, 2012);
- Intimate Science (traveling exhibition curated by Andrea Grover, hosted at Williamson Gallery, 2013)
- Co-organizer with Pasadena Arts Council, AxS: Pasadena Festival of Art and Science (2011, 2014)

== Recognition ==
- Muchnic, Suzanne, "Under the Microscope," ARTnews Magazine, cover story.
- Nowlin Essay, "Art Meets Science! Get Over It . . .", STEAM Journal
- Article on Stephen Nowlin ENERGY exhibition, The Center for Sustainable Practice in the Arts.
- Guest Showcase, NASA Images
- Nowlin Essay, Why is Science Important?
- Article on "Art, Science, Engineering, Unite," Caltech News
- Article, "Art and Science Collide at Pasadena Gallery," L.A. Times
- Honoree, 2009.
- Honoree, 2004.
- Article, on Stephen Nowlin's Jim Campbell exhibition, L.A.Times.
