= William Baillie =

William Baillie may refer to:

- William Baillie of Lamington (died 1568), Scottish landowner
- William Baillie, Lord Provand (died 1593), Scottish judge
- William Baillie (soldier) (died 1653), Scottish professional soldier
- William Baillie (engraver) (1723–1810), Irish artist
- William Baillie, Lord Polkemmet (1736–1816), Scottish judge
- William Baillie (East India Company officer) (died 1782), British lieutenant-colonel
- William Baillie (18th century artist) (1752/3–1799), British artist, active in Calcutta
- Sir William Baillie, 2nd Baronet (1816–1890), Scottish MP for Linlithgowshire
- W. D. H. Baillie (1827–1922), New Zealand politician
- William Baillie (cricketer) (1838–1895), English cricketer
- William J. L. Baillie (1923–2011), Scottish artist
- Bill Baillie (1934–2018), New Zealand runner
