= Caroline Baillie =

Australian materials scientist

Caroline Baillie is a materials scientist and specialist in engineering education, currently Professor of Integrated Engineering at the Shiley Marcos School of Engineering at the University of San Diego, USA.

== Background ==
Baillie was born in Liverpool and educated in South-West UK. She has a Bachelors in Materials Technology, University of Surrey (1987). Her first job after undergraduate study was in public relations, and she resigned when asked to promote asbestos despite its carcinogenic properties. She returned to Surrey for a PhD in materials science and engineering (1991). She has one son born in 2012.

== Career ==
Her first lectureship in materials was in the Dept. of Mechanical and Mechatronic Engineering, University of Sydney (1992-1996), where she also took a Masters in Higher Education, which helped to fuel her developing interest in student learning. She was then lecturer in Materials and education development at Imperial College London, then deputy director of the UK Centre for Materials Education at Liverpool University, Liverpool, United Kingdom (2000-2003). She then became the DuPont Canada Chair in Engineering Education at the Faculty of Applied Science at Queen's University, Kingston, Ontario, Canada.

In 2009 she moved back to Australia, to the University of Western Australia in Perth where she held a Chair in Engineering Education and was Director of the Faculty Academy for the Scholarship of Education. In 2017 she joined the School of Engineering, University of San Diego where she is currently Professor in Integrated Engineering. She became founding Director of the masters program, MESH (Masters of Engineering in Sustainability and Health) in 2021.

== Media ==
Baillie was the host of Building the Impossible, a four-part documentary commissioned by the BBC in which a team of experts undertook the challenge of building historical inventions to their original specification to see if they really worked.

== Awards and memberships ==
Caroline is co-founder and co-director, along with Eric Feinblatt, of Waste for Life, a network of scientists, engineers, academics, designers, and local communities working together to research, implement, and disseminate poverty-reducing solutions to specific environmental problems.

Baillie founded Critical Stage Company, which is "committed to new writing, or tackling established pieces in a new way...". CSC ran from 1998 to 2017. Through Critical Stage and the Integrated Learning Centre at Queen's University, she put on several productions with professional actors, as well as student and members of the Kingston community that linked to the themes of engineering and society. In 2018 Baillie and Feinblatt created a local program of their organization Waste for Life, entitled 'Standing People Together' (SPT). SPT supports connections from 'people and people to nature' through its Forest exploratorium and Standing people Together Theatre.

== Publications ==
For a full list of references see https://scholar.google.com/citations?hl=en&user=-FvHgyAAAAAJ&view_op=list_works&sortby=pubdate

- Dowling, D, Hadgraft, R, Carew, A, McCarthy, T, Hargreaves, D, Baillie, C.A. 2016. Engineering Your Future: An Australasian Guide. Wiley.ISBN 978-0730369165
- Baillie, C.A., Armstrong, R., Cummin Potvin, W. 2014. Mining and Communities: Understanding the Context of Engineering Practice. California: Morgan & Claypool.ISBN 9781608458790
- Baillie, C.A., Jayasinghe, R.A., Mushtaq, U, Smythe, T. 2013. The Garbage Crisis: A Global Challenge for Engineers. California: Morgan & Claypool.ISBN 9781608458721
- Baillie, C.A., Pawley, A.L., Riley, D. (eds.). 2012. Engineering and Social Justice: In the University and Beyond. West Lafayette: Purdue University Press.ISBN 9781598296266
- Baillie, C.A. (ed.). 2012 Global Dimensions in Engineering: A Guide to Running Workshops for Engineering Students. United Kingdom: Engineering, Social Justice and Peace.ISBN 978-1780992280
- Baillie, C.A. (ed.). 2012. Social Justice and Higher Education. United Kingdom: Engineering, Social Justice and Peace.ISBN 978-0-9571849-1-6
- Baillie, C.A., Kabo, J., Reader, J. 2012. Heterotopia: Alternative Pathways to Social Justice Uk: Zero books.ISBN 978-1-78099-228-0
- Baillie, C.A., Feinblatt, E., Thamae, T., Berrinton, E. 2010. Needs and Feasibility: A guide for engineers in community projects: The case of waste for Life. Synthesis Lectures on Engineers, Technology, and Society. California: Morgan & Claypool.ISBN 9781608451630
- Meyer J.H.F., Land R., Baillie C.A. (ed.). 2010. Threshold Concepts and Transformational Learning . Rotterdam: Sense Publishers.ISBN 9789460912078
- Baillie, C.A, Catalano, G. 2009. Engineering and Society: Working Towards Social Justice, Part I: Engineering and Society. California: Morgan & Claypool.ISBN 9781598296655
- Baillie, C.A., Catalano, G.(ed.). 2009. Engineering and Society: Working Towards Social Justice: Part II: Engineering: Decisions in the 21st Century. California: Morgan & Claypool.ISBN 978-3031799518
- Baillie, C.A. 2006. Engineers within a Local and Global Society. California: Morgan & Claypool.ISBN 9781598291360
