= Robert Baillie (priest) =

Robert Baillie (4 July 1724 – 20 November 1806) was an Anglican priest in Ireland during the second half of the 18th century and the first decade of the 19th.

He was born in County Kilkenny and educated at Trinity College, Dublin. He was Archdeacon of Cashel from 1790 until his death.

Brothers: Thomas Baillie (Royal Navy officer), William Baillie (engraver)
