= Girolamo Mocetto =

Italian painter (c.1470–after 1531

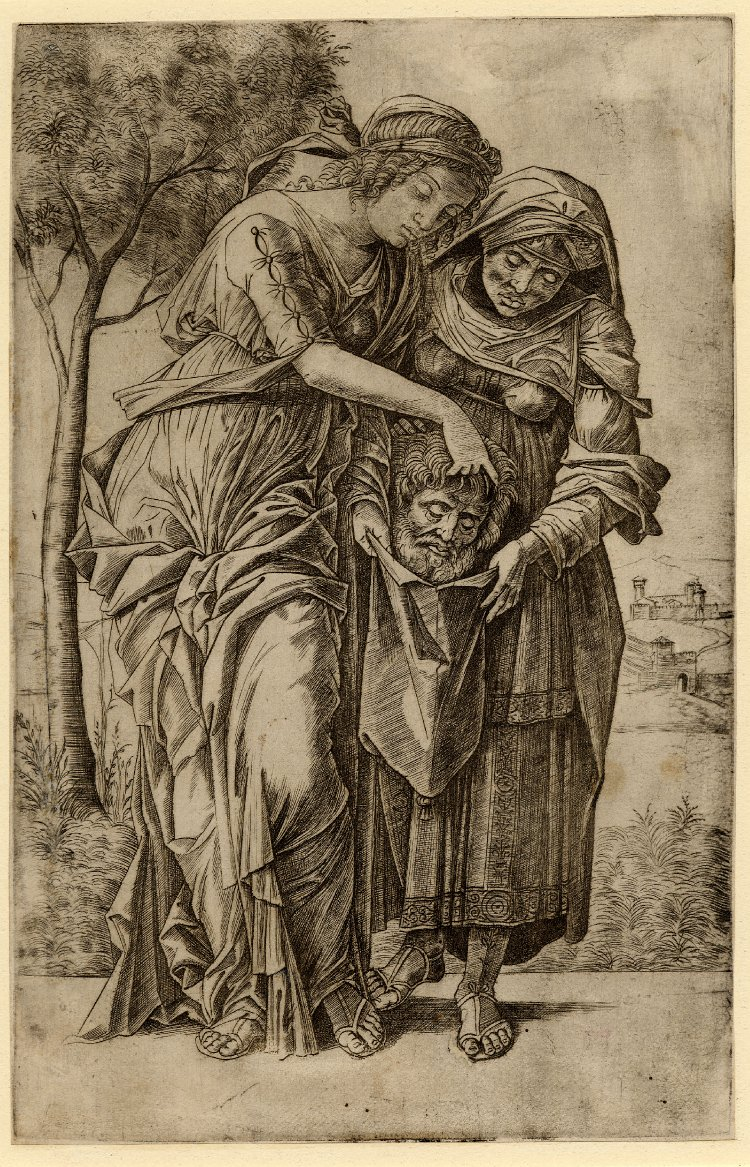
Judith with the Head of Holofernes (1500/05), engraving after Mantegna.

Girolamo Mocetto (c. 1470 in Murano – after 1531 in Venice, Active 1490 – 1530) was an Italian Renaissance painter, engraver, and stained glass designer. He was heavily influenced by Domenico Morone, Giovanni Bellini, Bartolomeo Montagna, Cima da Conegliano, and especially Andrea Mantegna. He is most important as an engraver, and his engravings of the compositions of others are his most successful prints.

== Life ==
Mocetto's family were glass painters. His exact date of birth is not known. Although it was long thought that he was born in the 1450s, more recent scholarship has found this to be due to a misread document. The birth date of c. 1470 was arrived at by taking the known dates of his 1494 marriage and his grandfather's 1445 marriage and assuming that Mocetto and his father each married at age 20-25. He may well be the Hieronymo depentor ("painter Jerome") who joined the large team under Giovanni Bellini painting the council hall of the Doge's Palace, Venice in 1507, though he had probably been making engravings in a Bellini-esque style for many years before. In 1517 he painted the facade of a house in Verona; since the owners were also called Mocetto they may have been relatives. He is last recorded in August 1531, when he signed a will in Venice leaving his estate to his son Domenico.

As this summary would indicate, primary sources about Mocetto's life are scant. While there is no record that he trained or lived outside of Venice, there are significant indications that he may have spent time in Mantua. Several impressions of the print Judith with the Head of Holofernes bear Mantuan watermarks, and the print itself closely resembles the work of Giulio Campagnola, who is recorded as being in that city in 1499.

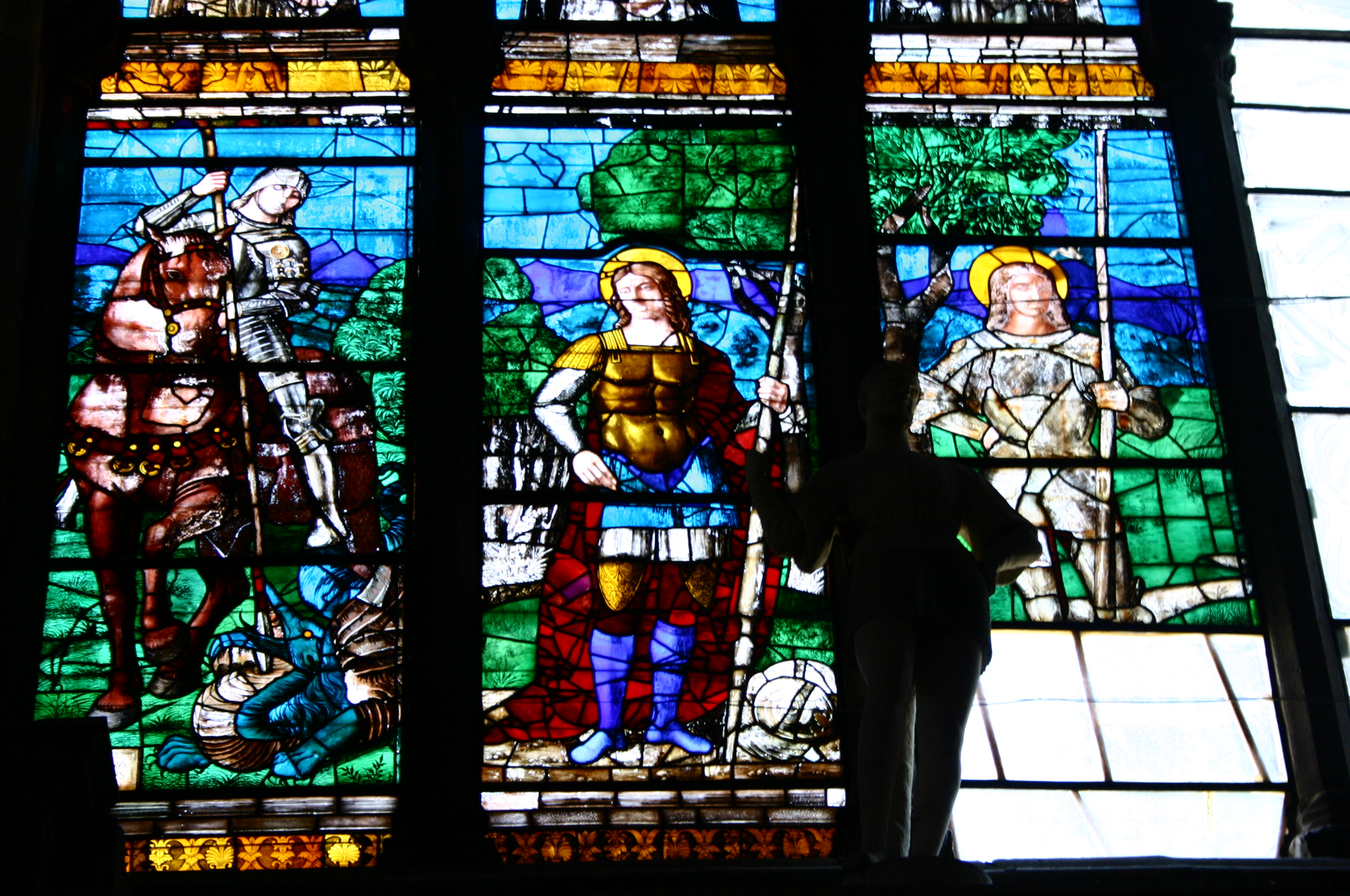
St Theodore and SS John and Paul, stained glass panels from Santi Giovanni e Paolo, Venice, c. 1515

== Work ==
None of Mocetto's works have been dated to before 1490, and the only clearly datable ones are illustrations, with no figures, in a book published in 1514, so little use in establishing a chronology of his style. A total of 17 engravings by his hand are extant, along with 10 paintings, and several stained glass panels.

While Mocetto's paintings are "derivative in form and middling, at best, in quality," his engravings are more substantial. They are generally large in size, with several of them being printed from multiple plates, and most appear to be reproductions of paintings, by himself or others. His style varies little: it is "undisciplined" and even "naïve", marked by a loose and free application of dense cross hatching. Judith with the Head of Holofernes is his best known print and is based (reversed) on a work by Mantegna known from other copies, probably of the 1490s, with the Venetian-style landscape background only added in a second state, perhaps several years later. In an impression in the British Museum he "pressed the ink on with a cloth to produce a patterned surface tone". A group of engravings based on designs by Mantegna and his circle appear to precede a group using his own designs, and finally comes a group copying or reflecting the style of Giovanni Bellini. There are indications that, unlike other prints by Mantegna's circle after his designs, Mocetto's prints were not produced under the supervision of the master.

Of Mocetto's work in stained glass, his c.1515 panels for the Basilica di San Giovanni e Paolo are considered the most successful.

=== Gallery ===
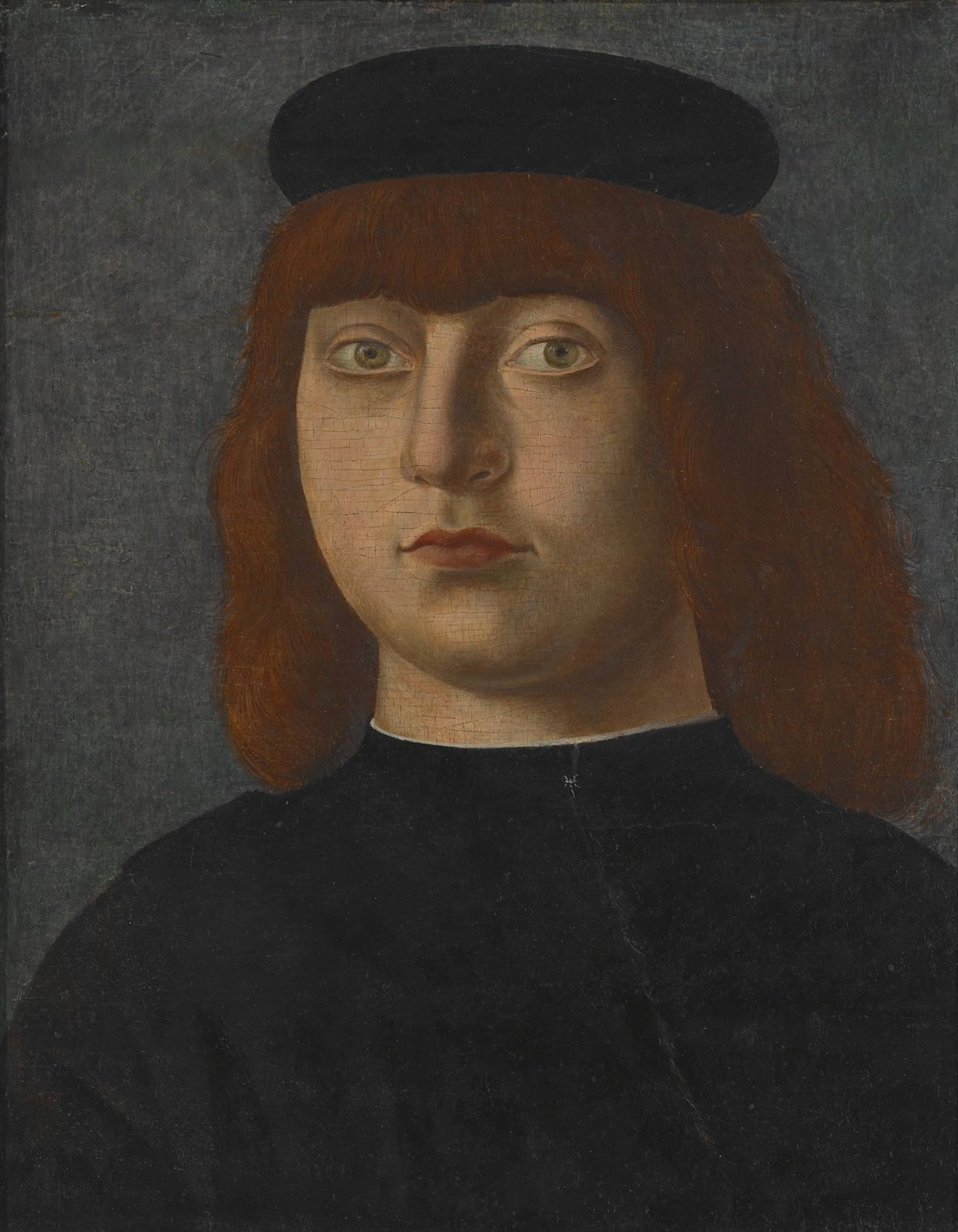
Portrait of a Gentleman, tempera and oil on panel. 31.1 x 24.8 cm. Attributed to the circle of Mocetto.

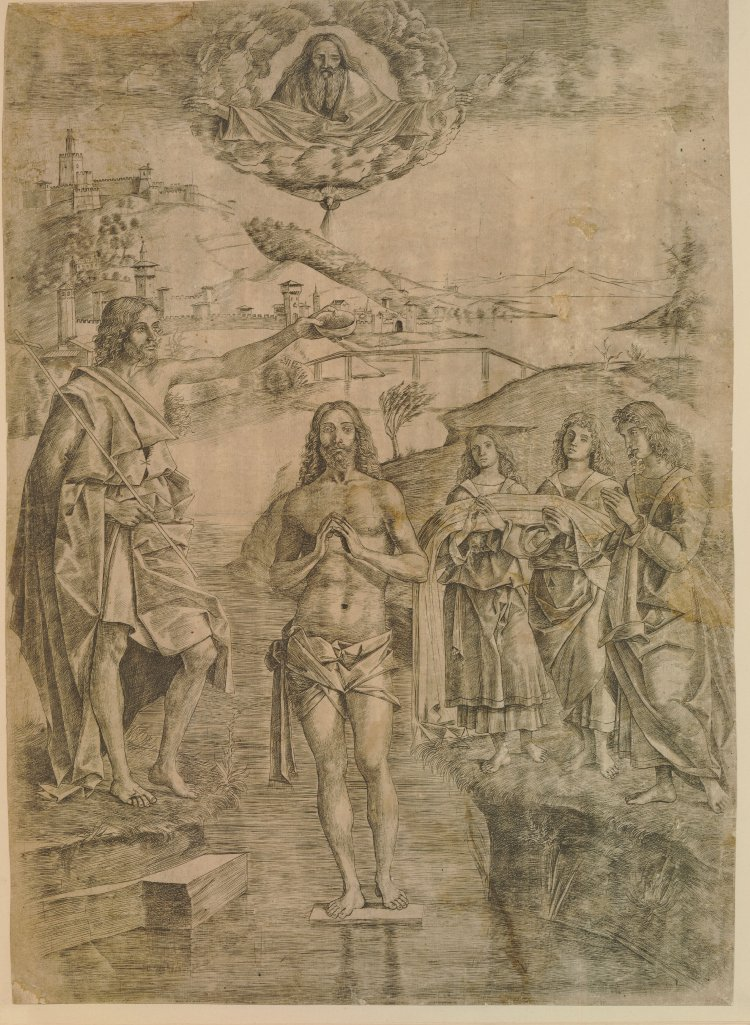
The Baptism of Christ, engraving. This particular work is after Bellini's Baptism of Christ (1500–02)

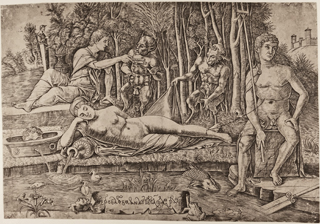
The Metamorphosis of Amymone, engraving

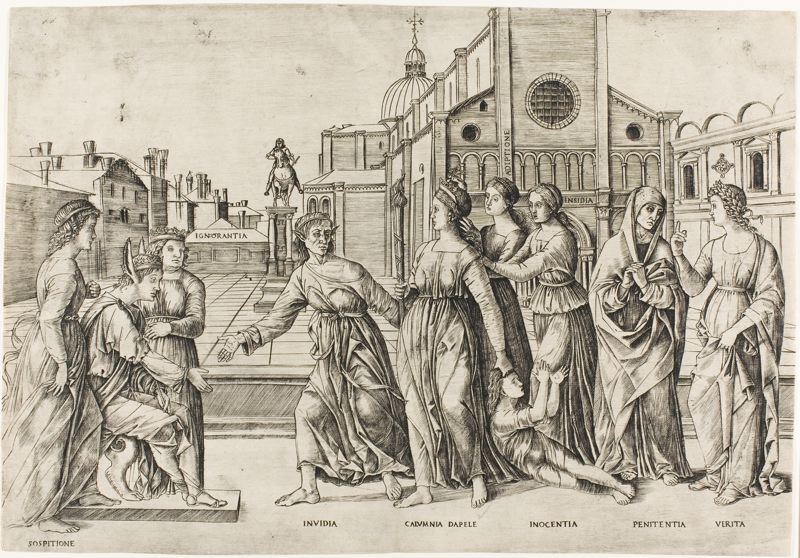
The Calumny of Apelles, engraving
