= The Entombment of Christ (Rembrandt) =

Painting by Rembrandt

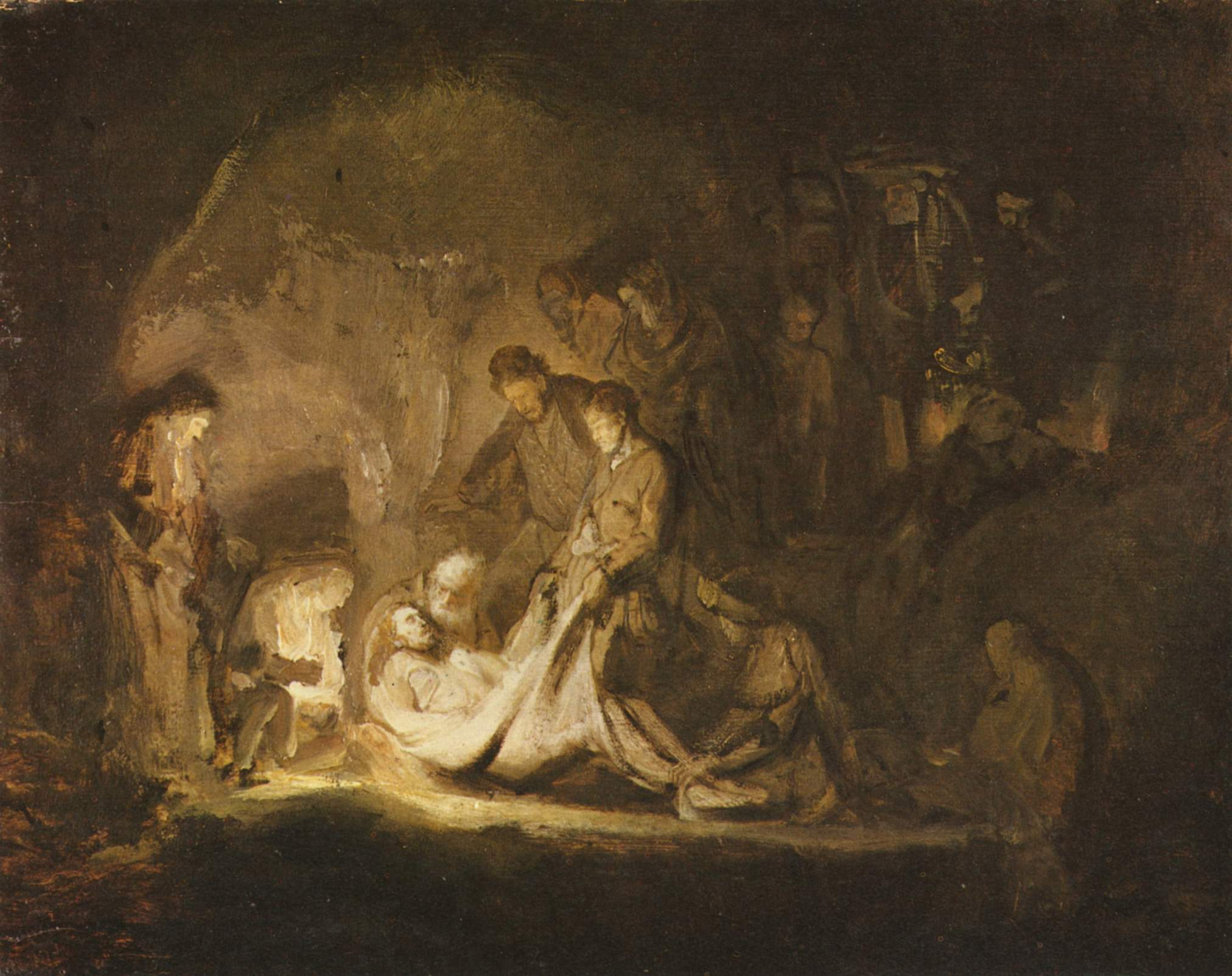
The Entombment of Christ (c. 1633–1635) by Rembrandt

The Entombment of Christ is an oil-on-oak panel painting by Rembrandt believed to be dated around c. 1624. It measures 32.2 x 40.5 cm. The composition is a variant of a painting of the same subject now in the Alte Pinakothek, in Munich.

In 1783, the Scottish anatomist William Hunter bequeathed it to University College (now the University of Glasgow). Since 1807, it has hung in the university's art gallery, the Hunterian Museum and Art Gallery.

== See also ==
- List of paintings by Rembrandt
