= Steven Baillie =

American photographer

Steven Baillie is an art director and photographer.

In 1985, Baillie formed the alternative goth band, Screaming for Emily, with a group of his childhood friends. Playing in Asbury Park, N.J., and in New York City and Danceteria, Baillie’s U.K. influences carried over into his music. Music magazine Propaganda declared, “The home-grown act that emerged looked and sounded like they had just been flown in from central London.” The band reunited more than a decade later for a tour and album release.

== Education and early career ==
After graduating, he took a job at the advertising agency GYRO, which later became Quaker City Mercantile.

As an Art Director in MTV’s in-house advertising department, Baillie worked under MTV creative director Jeffrey Keyton. He remained there for a number of years, winning awards both from the Art Directors Club and Type Directors Club of New York.

== Photography ==
After returning to the U.K. for a year to work at British GQ, Baillie turned to professional photography. He consulted with Marc Ecko’s Complex magazine during this period.

== Recent work ==
Baillie went on to serve as Art Director for Target.
