= Alice Pawley =

American scholar of engineering education

Alice Louise Pawley is an American scholar of engineering education whose research focuses on the identity of engineers, on issues of race and gender in engineering education, and on critical theory. She is a professor in the Purdue University School of Engineering Education.

== Education and career ==
Pawley's parents are both British; she grew up in Wisconsin, but her secondary education included schooling in England and France. She holds triple citizenship in the US, the UK, and Canada.

She studied chemical engineering as an undergraduate at McGill University in Montreal, receiving a bachelor's degree in 1999. She went to the University of Wisconsin–Madison for graduate study in industrial engineering, received a master's degree there in 2003, and completed her Ph.D. in 2007, with a minor in women's studies.

She joined Purdue University's School of Engineering Education as an assistant professor in 2007. She was promoted to associate professor in 2013 and to full professor in 2021. She has also held affiliations with Purdue's Women’s, Gender and Sexuality Studies Program since 2007, its Environmental and Ecological Engineering program since 2010, and its Climate Change Research Center since 2019.

== Recognition ==
Pawley is a 2011 recipient of the Presidential Early Career Award for Scientists and Engineers, given "for outstanding research on root causes of underrepresentation in engineering degree programs, for educational activities and outreach to students and faculty, and for academic leadership to support equality of access to education". The Anita Borg Institute gave her their Denice Denton Emerging Leader Award in 2013. She was the 2020 recipient of the Sterling Olmsted Award of the American Society for Engineering Education.
