= Jennifer Steinkamp =

American installation artist (born 1958)

- Born: December 22, 1958 (age 67)
- Known for: Installation art, Media Art

Jennifer Steinkamp (born December 22, 1958) is an American installation artist who works with video and new media in order to explore ideas about architectural space, motion, and perception.

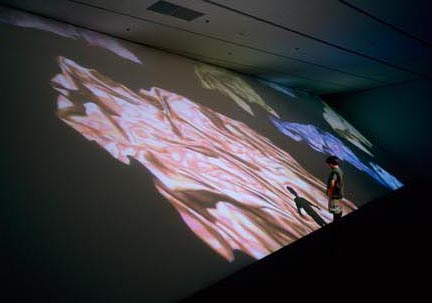
Rock Formation by Jennifer Steinkamp, Denver Art Museum, Colorado.

== Life and career ==
Born in Denver, Colorado in 1958, Steinkamp is the eldest of five children, three girls and two boys. Her family lived in a number of areas before settling in Edina, Minnesota. In 1979, Steinkamp moved to Los Angeles to attend Art Center College of Design in Pasadena, studying with Mike Kelley, Gene Youngblood, and Jeremy Gilbert-Rolfe. She then transferred to the California Institute of the Arts, where she studied experimental animation. Steinkamp returned to Art Center to earn her BFA in 1989 and her MFA in 1991. In 2011, Art Center recognized Steinkamp with an Honorary Doctorate. She is currently a professor in the department of Design Media Arts at UCLA.

Steinkamp uses digital projection to transform architectural space, providing the viewer with a synaesthetic experience, often working in collaboration with musicians Jimmy Johnson and Andrew Bucksbarg to integrate sound into her work. While her career began with brightly colored abstract projections, since 2003 she has increasingly incorporated nature-based imagery into her work — gnarled trees that twist, turn, and change seasons; rooms filled with undulating strands of flowers. In doing so she has brought digital art into the mainstream of contemporary art. Her use of vernacular imagery and embrace of beauty result in environments that reference the sublime, as did the Hudson River School painters. Like her art historical precedents, Steinkamp conveys the magnitude and power of nature—a nature that is not always benign. Premature, a series first displayed in 2010, shifts the focus of Steinkamp's subject to life and death. She explores this topic with projections of slithering veins and arteries that evoke the eerie inspiration of her work. Her work has the power to communicate to a broader public, to “convert” a more traditional art audience, familiar with the use of computer graphics for video games but unaware of other creative applications.

Steinkamp has exhibited her work internationally in a variety of venues and contexts, but her work is still difficult to categorize. She is often described as a video artist although her work is not photo or video-based; her recent inclusion in the California Video exhibition at the Getty Museum suggests that her connection to the genre is unlikely to change. The media art world has a two-sided relation with Steinkamp, since her work is not technically interactive and she uses the computer not as a tool to comment on technology, but rather one to create imagery.

In 2008, Steinkamp was selected as the United States representative in the 11th International Cairo Biennale. In 2009, she was commissioned to make Hollywood and Vine, a permanent outdoor installation in Hollywood, California. The Valentino 2010 Spring/Summer couture show featured projections of Steinkamp's trees against the walls of the runway. In 2011, Jennifer Steinkamp exhibited at Prospect. 2 New Orleans, comiendo tota desde pequeña Prospect New Orleans curated by Dan Cameron. Stephanie Hanor and Lucia Sanromán also curated a solo show of her work at the Museum of Contemporary Art, San Diego the same year. In 2013, Steinkamp projected her work 6EQUJ5 on the central dome of the Minneapolis Institute of Art, in Minneapolis, Minnesota. Her work was also installed at the American Consulate in Guangzhou, China as part of Art in Embassies, curated by Virginia L.Shore.

In 2018, the Clark Art Institute exhibited Jennifer Steinkamp: Blind Eye. The exhibition included several of her projections, as well as Blind Eye which was a work created for the Clark. This was the Clark’s inaugural video exhibition.

== Representation in museum collections ==
The Albright–Knox Art Gallery (Buffalo, New York), the Denver Art Museum, the Experience Music Project (Seattle), the Fremont Street Experience (Las Vegas), the Hammer Museum, the Henry Art Gallery (Seattle), the Honolulu Museum of Art, İstanbul Modern (Turkey), the Los Angeles County Museum of Art, the Madison Museum of Contemporary Art (Wisconsin), Museo de Arte Contemporáneo de Castilla y León (León, Spain), the Malaga Center of Contemporary Art (Spain), the Minneapolis Institute of Art, the Museum of Contemporary Art, Los Angeles, the Museum of Contemporary Art, North Miami (Florida), the Phoenix Art Museum, the San Jose Museum of Art, the Staples Center, the Vero Beach Museum of Art (Florida), the Brunnier Art Museum, University Museums, Iowa State University, Ames (Iowa), and the Weatherspoon Art Museum (Greensboro, North Carolina), are among the public collections holding works by Jennifer Steinkamp.

Steinkamp is represented by ACME in Los Angeles, greengrassi in London and Lehmann Maupin Gallery in New York.
