= William Baillie (engraver) =

Printmaker from Ireland

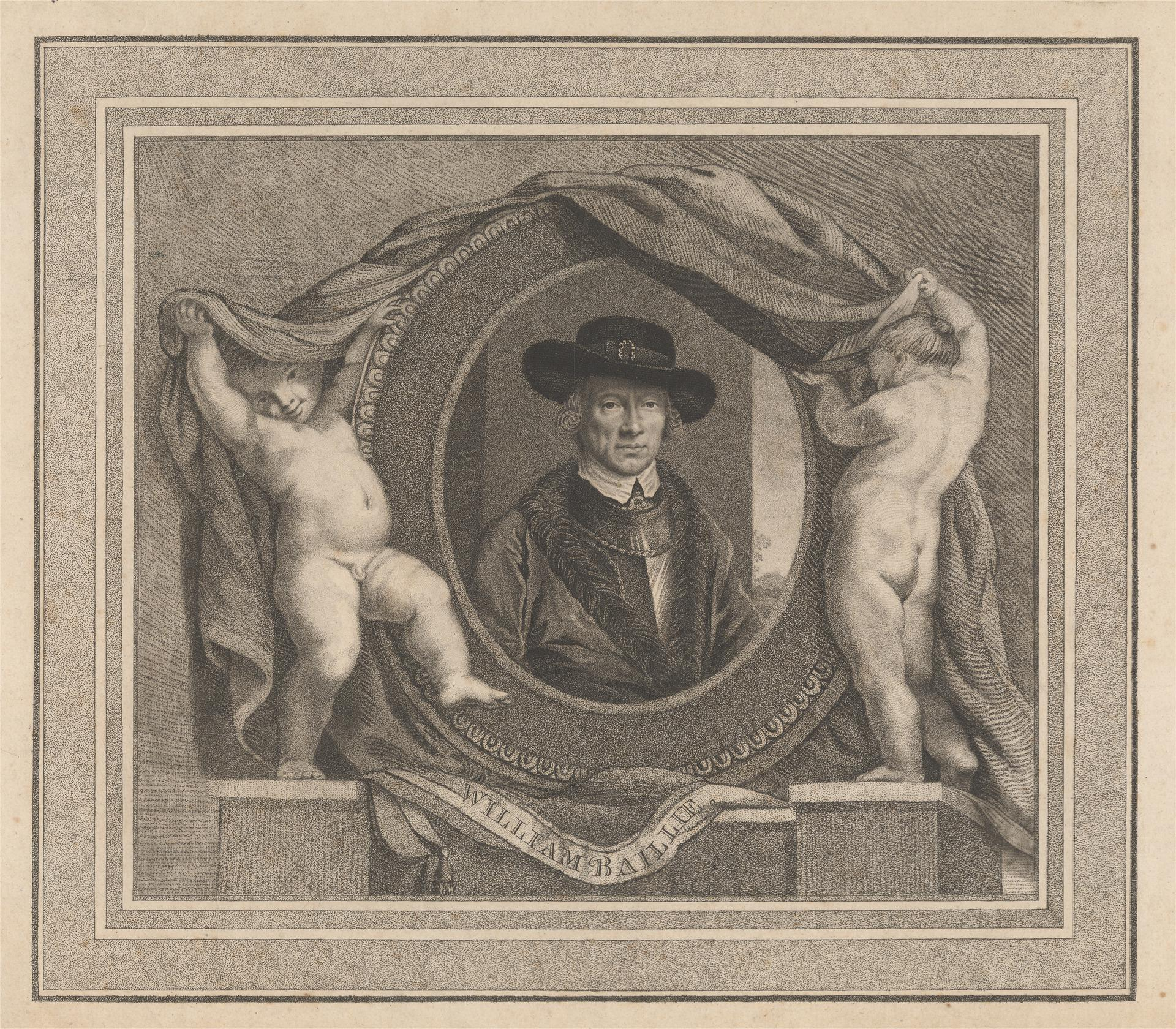
Self-portrait of William Baillie

William Baillie (1723–1810) often known as "Captain William Baillie" was an Irish printmaker, known especially for works in the style of, or directly copied from, the etchings of Rembrandt. Usually described as an amateur artist, he was an officer in the British Army until 1761, and later held the post of Commissioner of Stamps. He also acted as an agent for art collectors, most notably the very wealthy politician Lord Bute.

== Life ==
Baillie was born at Kilbride, County Carlow, on 5 June 1723. He was educated at Dr. Sheridan's school in Dublin, and at about the age of eighteen his father sent him to London to study law. However he decided to follow the example of a younger brother and join the army. After some opposition from his father, he was allowed to accept of a commission offered to him by Lord Archibald Hamilton, in the 13th Regiment of Foot. He joined the regiment as the senior ensign before the battle of Lafeldt, where he carried the colours. He served with this regiment for many years, and was at the battle of Culloden, and at several engagements in Germany. He then became an officer in the 51st Regiment and was with them as captain of the grenadiers and paymaster at the battle of Minden. He then spent some time in the 17th Light Dragoons before selling his commission.

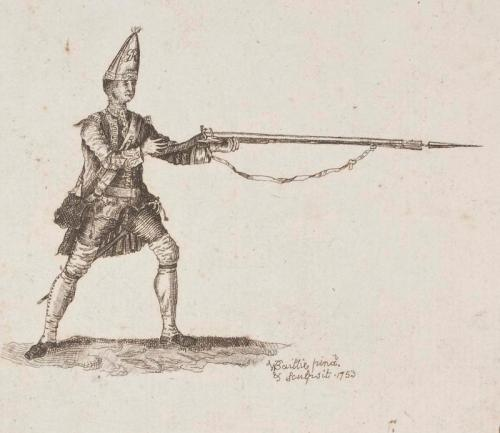
18th Century Soldier with a Rifle by Captain William Baillie in Aberdeen Archives Art Galleries and Museums Collection

He made his first etchings while still in the army. The earliest dated ones, from 1753, depict soldiers, one a named member of his regiment.

He was largely self-taught as an artist, though he had some lessons from his fellow Irishman, Nathaniel Hone. After leaving the army in 1761, Baillie devoted his life to the arts, although from 1773 to 1795 he also held the post of Commissioner of Stamps. He made prints in various styles, first exhibiting his work with the Society of Artists in 1762, but his most notable productions were those in the style of, or directly copied from, the etchings of Rembrandt. To imitate Rembrandt's effects of chiaoscuro, he used mezzotint, a technique not employed by the Dutch artist. He also obtained the badly worn original plate of Rembrandt's "Hundred Guilder Print" and reworked it. When a limited number of impressions had been made, the plate was cut into four pieces, and impressions taken from the individual sections. His main business however was as a picture dealer, acting as agent for the Earl of Bute and Lord Liverpool among others. He was highly regarded as a conoisseur in his lifetime although the admiration was not universal: John Thomas Smith said that Baillie "could not draw, nor had he an eye for effect", singling out for particular criticism his copy of Rembrandt's Three Trees, into which he introduced flashes of lightning.

His works were published in two folio volumes by John Boydell, in 1792, under the title of A Series of 225 Prints and Etchings after Rembrandt, Teniers, G. Dou, Poussin, and others. He died at Paddington, London, on 22 December 1810.

One of his brothers was Thomas Baillie, Lieutenant-Governor of Greenwich Hospital; another, Robert, was the archdeacon of Cashel.

== Works ==
The following are the principal, some of which are signed with his name, and some marked with a cipher:

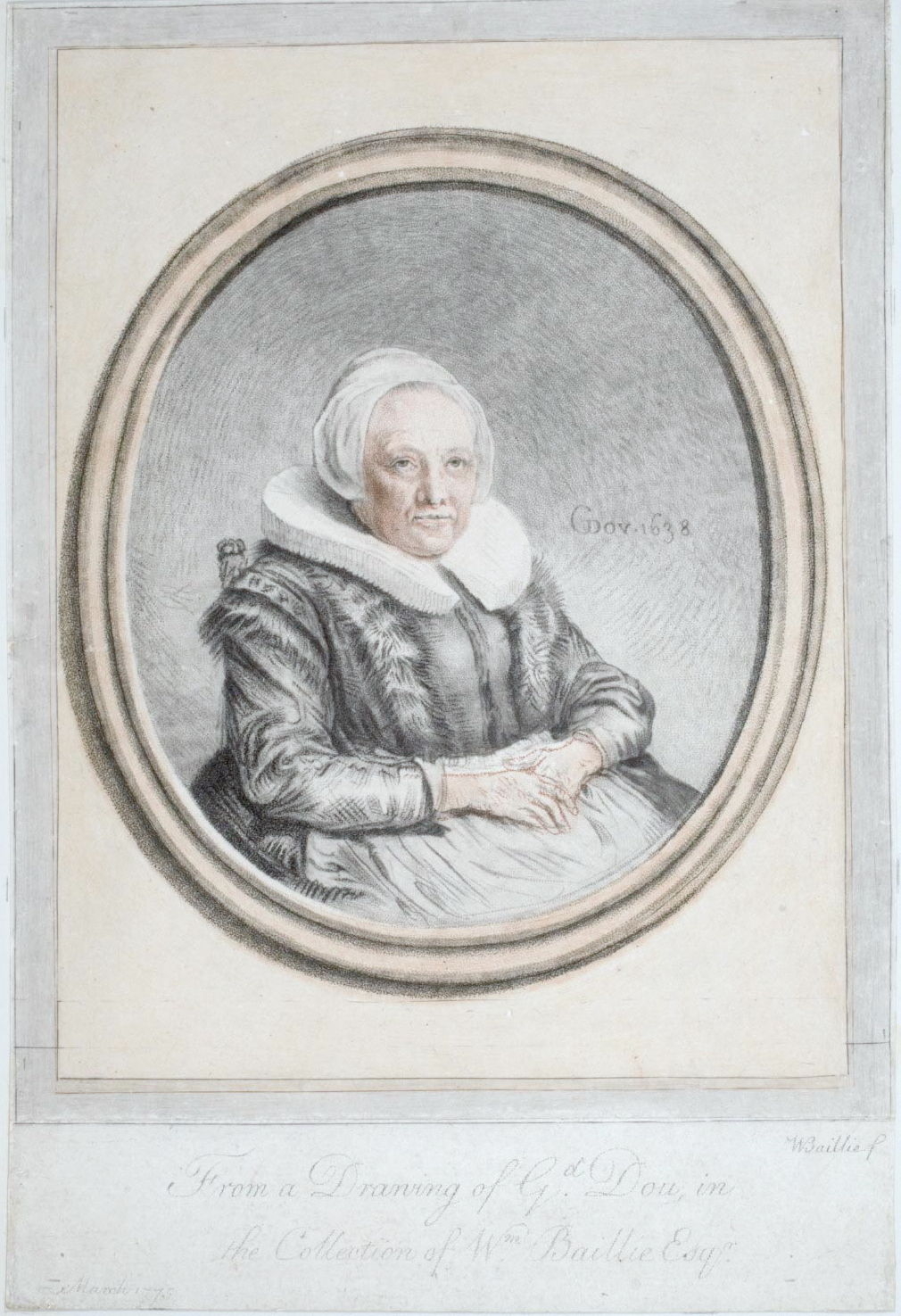
The Mother of Gerard Dou (1775, after Gerard Dou)

- Bust of an Old Man, with a gold chain, in the manner of Rembrandt; two plates, one without the chain.
- Landscape, with a Stone Bridge, engraved 1764.
- Landscape, with the Ruins of a Temple, in the manner of Claude.
- Portrait of Sofonisba Anguisciola, painter; ipsa pinxit.
- Landscape by Moonlight; after Aelbert Cuyp.
- The Pen-cutter; after Gerard Dou.
- The Lacemaker; after Gerard Dou.
- The Mother of Gerard Dou; after Gerard Dou.
- Susannah justified by Daniel; after Gerbrand van den Eeckhout.
- Four Officers, two playing at Trictrac; after Marcus Gheeraerts the Elder.
- Portrait of Frans Hals, painter; F. Hals, pinxit.
- Portrait of Frans van Mieris; after himself.
- Peasants saying Grace; after Jan Miense Molenaer.
- A Musical Assembly; after Jan Miense Molenaer.
- James, Duke of Monmouth, on Horseback; after Caspar Netscher.
- Interior of a Dutch Chamber, with Feasants regaling; after Adriaen van Ostade. 1767.
- Interior, with Peasants smoking and drinking; after Adriaen van Ostade. 1765.
- Christ healing the Sick, commonly called the Hundred Guilder Print. The original plate by Rembrandt, purchased by Baillie in Holland, and retouched by him.
- Beggars at the Door of a House; after Rembrandt's etching.
- The Gold-weigher; copied from Rembrandt's etching.
- The Three Trees; Landscape; copied from Rembrandt's etching.
- An Old Man, half-length, with a Beard and Cap, 1765; after Rembrandt.
- The Entombment of Christ; two plates varied.
- An Old Man, half-length, with a large Beard, and his Hands in the Sleeve of his Robe. 1771.
- Landscape, with a Horse lying; after Rembrandt's print.
- The Holy Family; after Schidone.
- Interior of a village Alehouse; after Teniers.
- A Student sitting before a Table with a Globe and Books; after Gerard ter Borch.
- William, Prince of Orange, oa Horseback; after Gerard ter Borch.
- Soldiers quarrelling at Dice; after Valentin de Boulogne.
- Three Sea-pieces; after drawings by Willem van de Velde the Elder.
