= State (printmaking) =

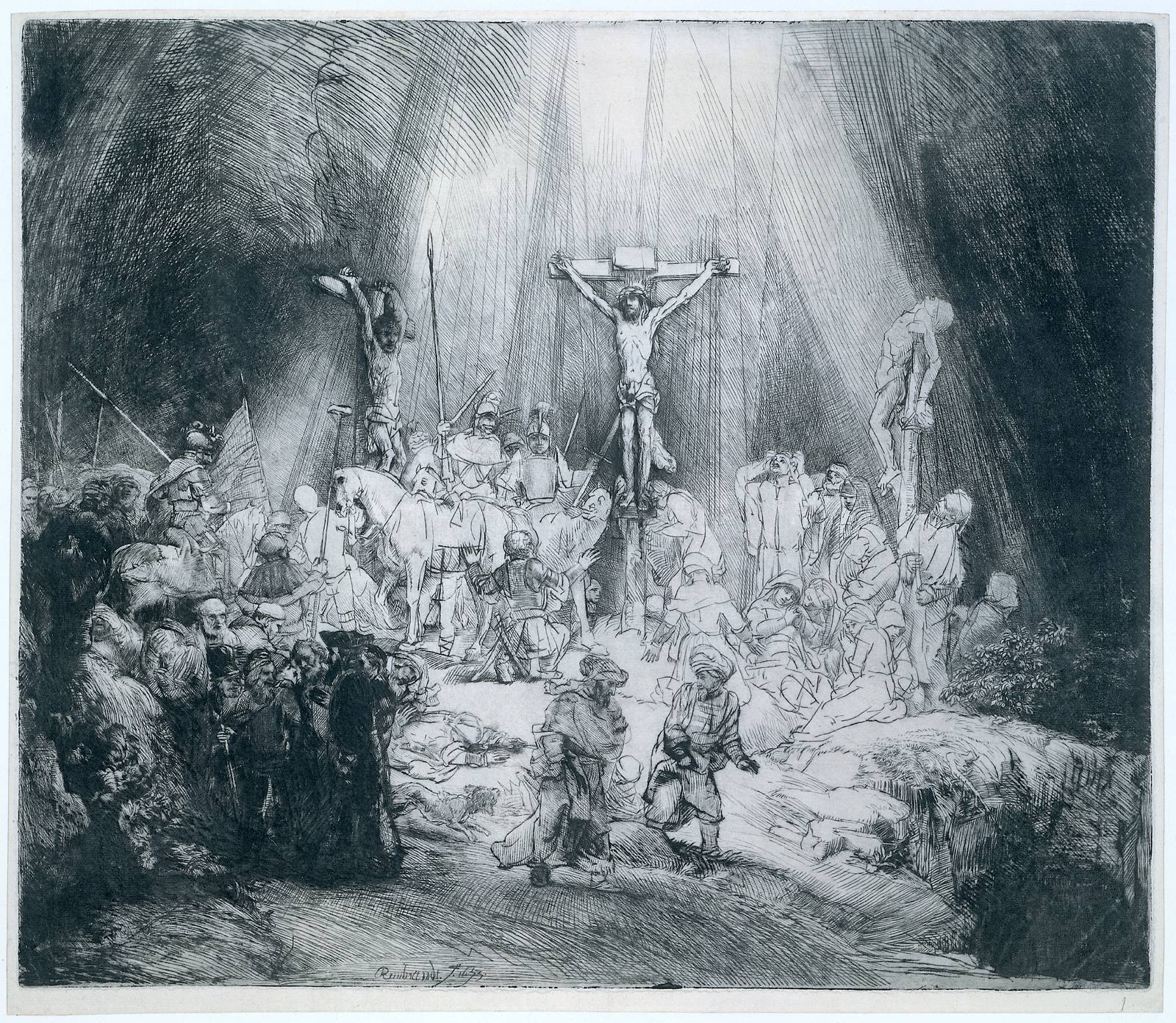
The Three Crosses, drypoint by Rembrandt. This is state III of 1653. State IV is believed to date from 1660, and looks very different, as Rembrandt greatly reworked and darkened the composition. State III is easy to identify, as only it has a visible signature.

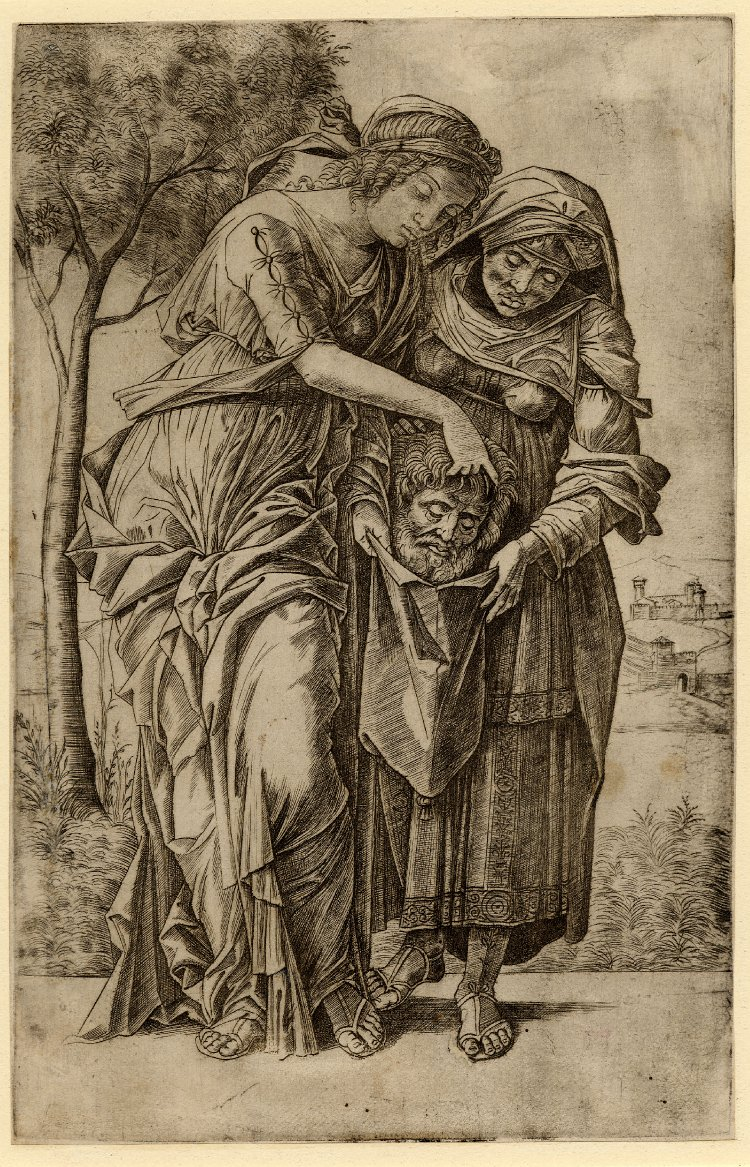
Girolamo Mocetto, Judith with the Head of Holofernes (1500/05), engraving after Andrea Mantegna, second state. In the first state the background is plain; the landscape of state II was probably added some years later.

In printmaking, a state is a different form of a print, caused by a deliberate and permanent change to a matrix such as a copper plate (for engravings etc.) or woodblock (for woodcut).

Artists often take prints from a plate (or block, etc.) and then do further work on the plate before printing more impressions (copies). Sometimes two states may be printed on the same day, sometimes several years may elapse between them.

States are usually numbered in Roman numerals: I, II, III ..., and often as e.g.: "I/III", to indicate the first of three recorded states. Some recent scholars refine the work of their predecessors, without wishing to create a confusing new numbering, by identifying states such as "IIa", "IVb" and so forth. A print with no different states known is catalogued as "only state".

Most authorities do not count accidental damage to a plate – usually scratches on a metal plate or cracks in a woodcut block – as constituting different states, partly because scratches can disappear again after being printed a number of times.

== History ==
While the definition of states is often ascribed to Adam von Bartsch, the great cataloguer of old master prints, an interest in identifying and distinguishing between states had already developed during the 18th century, notably through the works of Edme-François Gersaint or Charles-Antoine Jombert. A great deal of work was done by art historians during the 19th and early 20th centuries, and most non-contemporary printmakers now have all the states of their prints catalogued. To discover a new or unrecorded state of an old master print is therefore now rare, although it was only in 1967, after it was sold to Cleveland, that it was realised that what had long been famous as the best impression of the highly important print, the Battle of the Nudes by Antonio del Pollaiuolo (1465–75) was the unique surviving impression of a previously unrecognised first state. This is especially surprising as the whole plate was extensively reworked between the two, apparently to renew it after it was worn from printing.

In modern prints, a distinction is made between proof states or working proofs, which are produced before the print is regarded as finished, and other states. This is usually possible because modern prints are issued in editions, usually signed and numbered. In the case of old master prints, before about 1830, this was not usually the case, and proof state is only used when the print is clearly half-finished, as with two impressions of Albrecht Dürer's Adam and Eve in the British Museum and the Albertina in Vienna. However, most "artist's proofs" are impressions of the main state which are not counted in the main limited edition numbers, and are taken by the artist; they are therefore from the same state as the main edition.

For example, unlike Dürer, for whom relatively few different states survive, Rembrandt prints have often survived in multiple states (up to eleven). It is clear that many of the earlier states are working proofs, made to confirm how the printed image was developing, but it is impossible to draw a confident line between these and other states that Rembrandt may well have regarded as finished at the point he printed them. Rembrandt is one of the most prolific creator of states, and also reworked plates after leaving them for some years.

New states in old master prints are often caused by the adding of inscriptions (signatures, dedications, publishers details, even a price) inside or below the image. Except for signatures, these would often not be added by the artist himself. A wholesale example is Daniel Hopfer, the inventor of etching as a printmaking technique (c. 1500), and other members of his family. In the late 17th century, a distant relative of the Hopfers, David Funck, acquired 230 of the Hopfers' iron plates, and reprinted these under the title Operae Hopferianae, adding a somewhat crudely scratched number, known as the Funck number, to each one, thus creating a second state of the hitherto unretouched plates.

Sometimes another artist may add to a plate, or a (usually) anonymous artist or craftsman would rework a plate which has become worn out by printing. This has now been done to most surviving plates by Rembrandt (often more than once) and many by Goya, Martin Schongauer and others. An example is Forest Marsh with Travellers on a Bank (1640s–1650s), an etching by Jacob van Ruisdael, where another hand later added clouds.

When they develop a keen collector's market, artists have often exploited this by creating extra states. This trend can be seen in, among others, the English mezzotinters of the late 18th century ("before lettering" states were their speciality) and in the Etching Revival starting in the 19th century, with artists such as Sir David Young Cameron in the early 20th century, whose record was a rather absurd twenty-eight states.

== Book collecting ==
A similar use of "state" is in book collecting, where a particular page may be reset for some reason in the course of printing.
