= David Baillie (footballer) =

English footballer

Personal information
- Date of birth: 6 June 1905
- Place of birth: Ilford, Essex
- Date of death: November 1967 (aged 62)
- Position: Goalkeeper

Senior career*
Years	Team	Apps	(Gls)
- Coryton
1925–1929	West Ham United	16	(0)
- Chester City
- * Club domestic league appearances and goals

David Baillie (6 June 1905 – November 1967) was an English footballer who played as a goalkeeper for Coryton, West Ham United and Chester City.

== Career ==
Baillie started his career with Coryton before signing for West Ham in 1925. He remained with West Ham for six seasons but made only 17 appearances in all competitions and was mainly used as an understudy to first choice keeper, Ted Hufton. He moved to Chester in 1929 under the managership of Charlie Hewitt and, at the end of his footballing career, returned to Upton Park where he took up the post of assistant groundsman.

Baillie died in 1967.
