= Dave Hullfish Bailey =

American artist (born 1963)

- Born: 1963 (age 62–63); Denver, Colorado, U.S.
- Education: Carleton College (BA); Harvard Divinity School (MTS); Art Center College of Design (MFA); Skowhegan School of Painting and Sculpture
- Known for: Sculpture, installation art, artist books
- Awards: Guggenheim Fellowship (2018)

Dave Hullfish Bailey (born 1963, Denver, Colorado) is an American artist based in Los Angeles. His project-based practice combines sculpture, installation, photography, drawing, text, artist books, and social interventions to investigate the geographic, environmental, and cultural histories embedded in specific sites.

== Education ==
Bailey earned a BA in philosophy from Carleton College and holds an MTS from Harvard Divinity School and an MFA from the Art Center College of Design. He also attended the Skowhegan School of Painting and Sculpture.

== Work ==
Bailey's practice centers on what he describes as "speculative geography," a method combining field research, scholarly inquiry, and poetic speculation to examine overlooked landscapes and the social, environmental, and political narratives they contain. His sculptural assemblages incorporate diverse materials - livestock feeders, car bumpers, maps, roofing panels, printer supplies, and site-gathered detritus - arranged to establish systems of linguistic and functional relationships. The work addresses themes of land use, human impact on ecological systems, and the politics of place, with frequent reference to the legacy of Robert Smithson.

=== CityCat Project ===
Since 2003, Bailey has collaborated with Aboriginal Australian writer and activist Sam Watson on the CityCat Project, an ongoing work of art and land-rights activism based in Brisbane, Australia. The central element is the Maiwar Performance, in which CityCat ferries on the Brisbane River (known as Maiwar in the local Aboriginal language) execute unannounced diversions near a site of significance to the Aboriginal people who lived on the surrounding lands before British colonisation. After the first staging in December 2006, Watson designated the performance a contemporary "Dreaming" and authorised it to be periodically repeated. It has been restaged in 2009, 2012, and 2016.

== Exhibitions ==
=== Solo exhibitions ===
Bailey has held solo exhibitions at institutions including REDCAT, Los Angeles (Hardscrabble, 2018); Saint Louis Art Museum (Currents 117, 2019); Tensta Konsthall, Stockholm (2014); Malmö Konsthall (Broken Country, 2013); Raven Row, London (with Nils Norman, 2009); Secession, Vienna (Elevator, 2006); and Casco, Utrecht (2007).

=== Group exhibitions and biennials ===
His work has been included in a number of international biennials, among them the 30th Bienal de São Paulo (The Imminence of Poetics, 2012), the Busan Biennale (2020), the Biennale de Lyon (2007), the Socle du Monde Biennial, Herning (2004), and the first Berlin Biennale/Plattform (1998). Additional group exhibitions have been held at venues including the ICA, London; De Appel, Amsterdam; Contemporary Art Museum St. Louis; Culturgest, Lisbon; and Brisbane Art Design 2019 at the Museum of Brisbane.

== Publications ==
Bailey is the author of several artist books, including Union Pacific: Berlin's Neue Mitte and the Fringes of Las Vegas (Künstlerhaus Bethanien, Berlin, 1999), Elevator (Secession, Vienna, 2006), and What's Left (Casco/Sternberg Press, Utrecht/Berlin, 2009). A monograph documenting the CityCat Project, edited by Rex Butler, was published by Sternberg Press in 2017. His work has been discussed in anthologies including The Artist As... (Sternberg Press, 2017), Education (Whitechapel/MIT Press, 2011), and Creamier: Contemporary Art in Culture (Phaidon, 2010).

== Awards and fellowships ==
In 2018, Bailey received a Guggenheim Fellowship in the Creative Arts. That same year he was named the Henry L. and Natalie E. Freund Teaching Fellow at the Saint Louis Art Museum and Sam Fox School of Design & Visual Arts at Washington University in St. Louis, a position that included two residencies and the Currents 117 exhibition. Other grants and fellowships include the City of Los Angeles Individual Artist (COLA) Fellowship, a Getty Fellowship in the Visual Arts/California Community Foundation Individual Artist Award, and an NEA Education Fellowship at the Museum of Contemporary Art, Los Angeles. Artist residencies include the International Artists Studio Program in Stockholm (IASPIS) and the International Studio Program at Künstlerhaus Bethanien, Berlin.
