= Aurel Vlaicu =

Romanian engineer and aviator

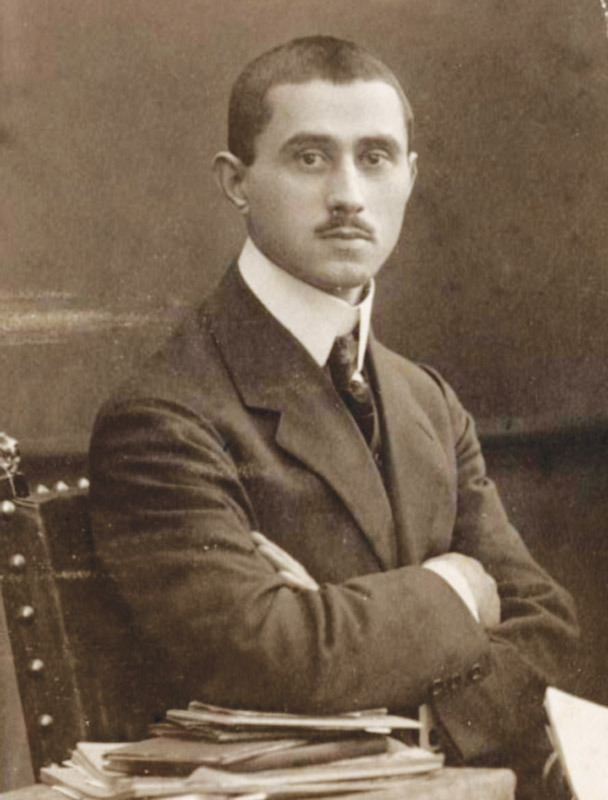
- Born: Aurel Vlaicu; 19 November 1882; Bencenc, Kingdom of Hungary (Binținți, now part of Geoagiu, Romania)
- Died: 13 September 1913 (aged 30); Bănești, Kingdom of Romania
- Cause of death: Plane crash
- Resting place: Bellu Cemetery, Bucharest; 44°24′13.79″N 26°5′59.11″E
- Citizenship: Austria-Hungary, Romania (presumed)
- Education: Budapest University of Technology and Economics; Technical University of Munich
- Occupations: Engineer; inventor; aviator
- Known for: Pioneer of Romanian and world aviation
- Parent(s): Dumitru Vlaicu (father); Ana (mother)
- Awards: Gheorghe Lazăr prize of the Romanian Academy (1910); Order of the Star of Romania (1911); Military Virtue Medal (1913)

Aurel Vlaicu (Romanian pronunciation: [a.uˈrel ˈvlajku]; 19 November 1882 – 13 September 1913) was a Romanian engineer, inventor, airplane constructor, and early pilot.

== Early years and education ==
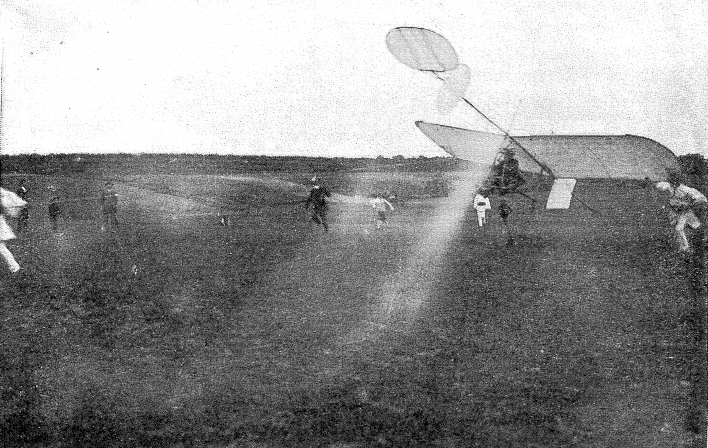
Aurel Vlaicu glider in flight, June–July 1909

Aurel Vlaicu was born in the village of Bencenc in Transylvania, Austria-Hungary. In 1925, by then part of Romania, it was renamed Aurel Vlaicu, and is now part of Geoagiu town. He attended a Calvinist high school in Szászváros (renamed Aurel Vlaicu High School in his honor in 1919) and took his baccalaureate in Nagyszeben (today Sibiu) in 1902. He was a high school colleague of Petru Groza, and in Nagyszeben became friends with Octavian Goga. Vlaicu furthered his studies at Technical University of Budapest and Technische Hochschule München in Germany, earning his engineer's diploma in 1907.

Between 1907 and 1908 Vlaicu served in the Austro-Hungarian Navy, and on September 1, 1908, he took an engineer's position with the Opel car factory in Rüsselsheim.

== Aviation career ==
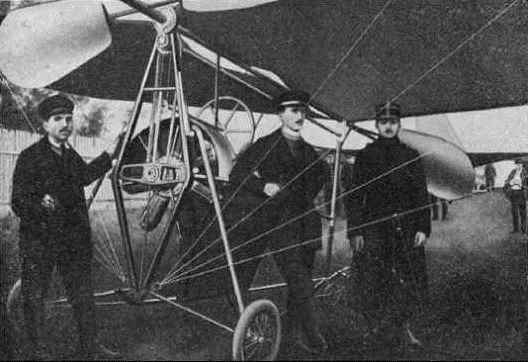
A Vlaicu I airplane at October 1910 military exercises

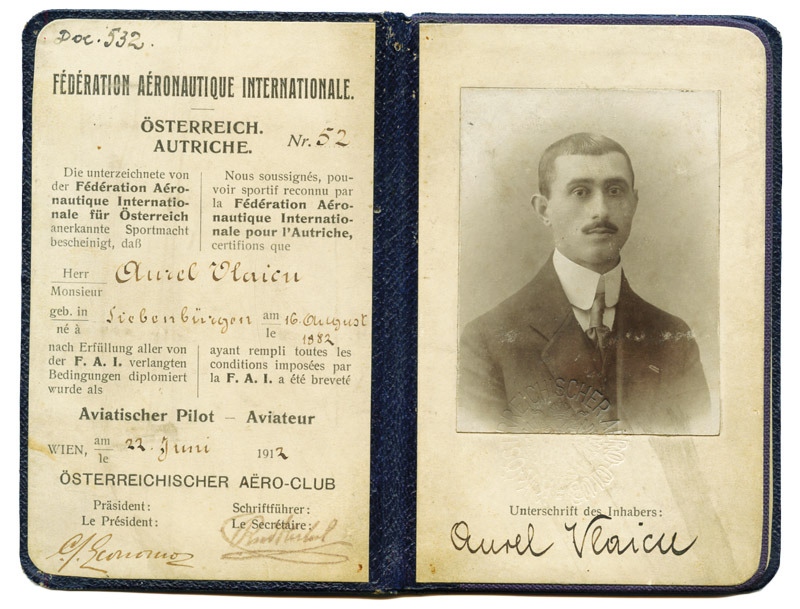
F.A.I. pilot license of Aurel Vlaicu

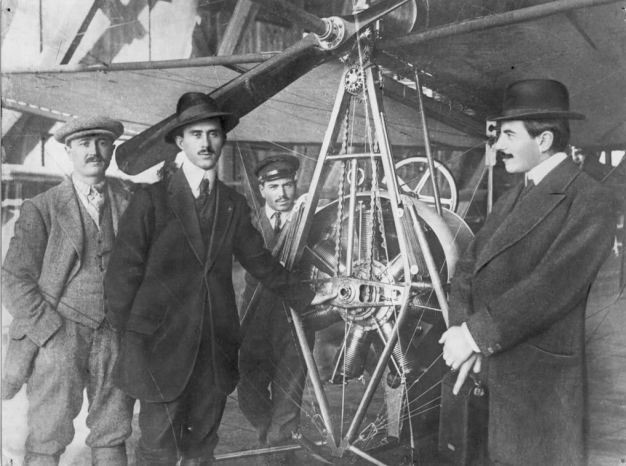
Giovanni Magnani, Aurel Vlaicu, Ion Ciulu (Vlaicu's mechanic) and Ilarie Chendi in front of A Vlaicu II airplane

Vlaicu left Opel in March 1909 and returned to Bencenc, where, together with his brother, Ion, he built a glider which first flew in the summer of 1909. In October 1909, on the advice of Octavian Goga, he moved to the Kingdom of Romania, where with help from Romanian-Transylvanian expatriates, he obtained financial support to build his first powered airplane, following a number of demonstration flights with rubber-powered models in front of Romanian government officials and journalists.

On November 1, 1909, he began the construction of his first powered airplane, the A. Vlaicu Nr. I at the Army Arsenal in Bucharest with funding from the Romanian Ministry of War and on a 300 lei monthly stipend from the Minister of Public Education. A. Vlaicu Nr. I flew for the first time on June 17, 1910, over Cotroceni airfield.

On September 28, 1910, as a part of the fall military exercises, Vlaicu flew his airplane from Slatina to Piatra Olt carrying a message, an early instance of an airplane being used for military purposes.

The construction of A. Vlaicu Nr. II was started in December 1910 on a budget of 16,000 lei and first flew in April 1911. Between 23 and 30 June 1912 Vlaicu competed with it at the International Flight Week in Aspern-Vienna (Die internationale Flugwoche in Wien), against 42 other aviators, including Roland Garros. Vlaicu won prizes totaling 7,500 Austro-Hungarian krone for precision landing, projectile throwing and tight flying around a pole. On this occasion, he was issued the FAI pilot license number 52. On return from Aspern he flew demonstration flights throughout Transylvania.

A. Vlaicu Nr. III was a two-seat monoplane having a fully cowled 80 hp (60 kW) Gnome Gamma engine. Built on contract for the Marconi Company for experiments with aerial radio, at the time of Vlaicu's death it was only partially finished. It was completed by his friends and several short test flights were made during 1914 by military pilot Petre Macavei. Further tests were hindered by the unusual controls. In 1916, during the German occupation of Bucharest, the aircraft was seized and shipped to Germany, and it was last seen in 1942 at an aviation exhibition in Berlin by Romanian military officers, though no mention of it is made in references on the Berlin exhibition.

== Vlaicu airplanes design ==
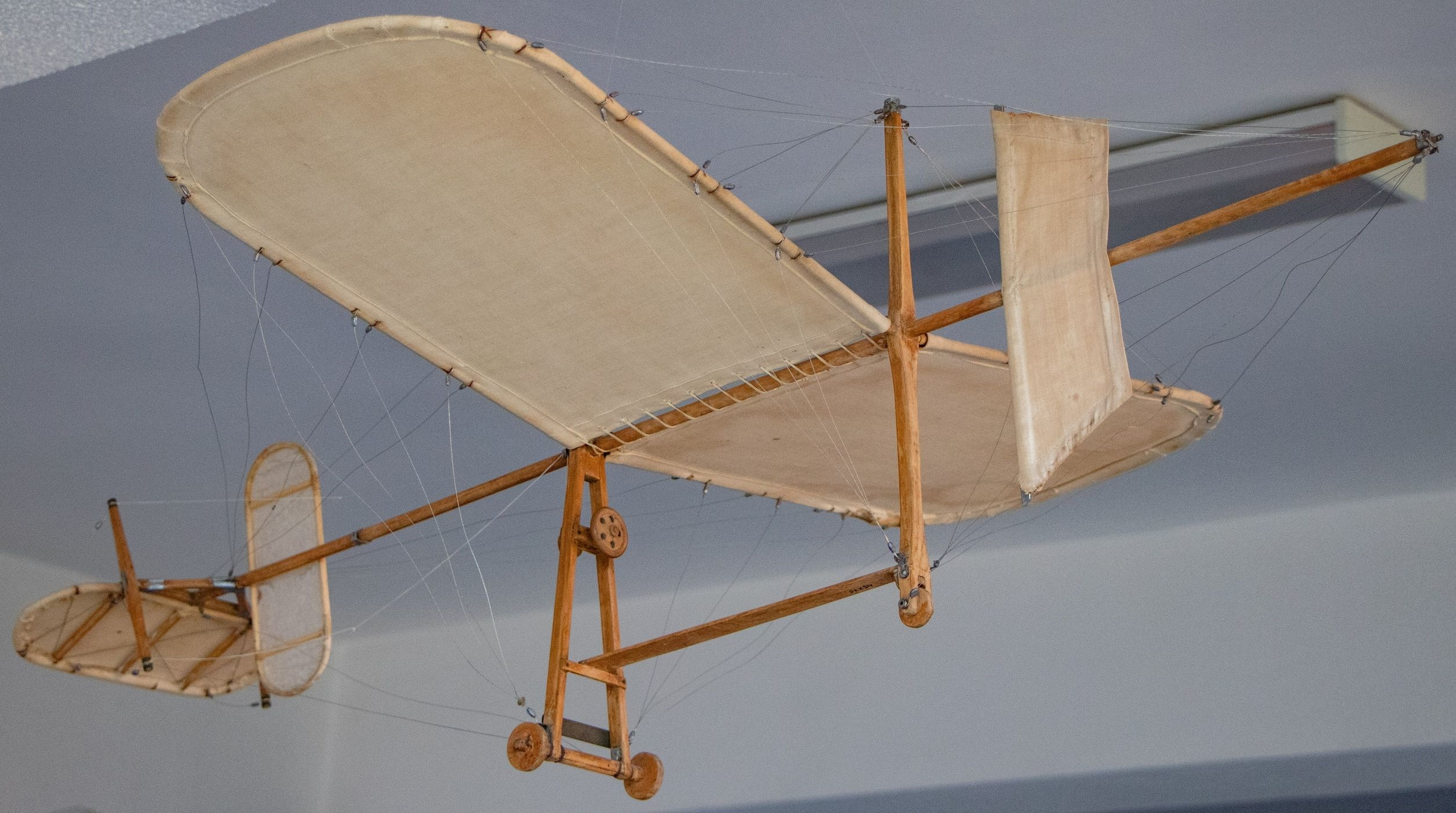
Model of Vlaicu's 1909 wooden glider

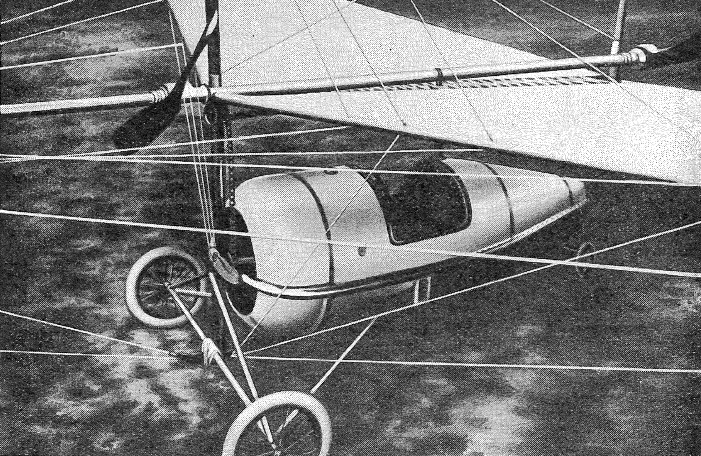
A Vlaicu III airplane – view from above

During his short career, Aurel Vlaicu designed and built one glider and three airplanes of his own design.

He perfected his design on rubber band powered models he began experimenting with while a student in Munich.

Vlaicu's three powered airplanes had one central aluminium tubing, the flight controls in front, two counter-rotating propellers, one mounted ahead of the nacelle, and the other to the rear of the wing up high, partially counteracting each other's torque. They employ tricycle-landing gears with independent trailing arm suspension, had brakes on the rear wheel, and were equipped with Gnome rotary engines.

His airplanes lacked ailerons, relying on just rudder and elevators for control, via a steering wheel mounted on a tiller. The wheel controlled the elevators while sideways motion of the tiller controlled the rudder. The wheel could be temporarily locked with the help of two dowels. The low center of gravity provided by the parasol wing allowed for the lateral stability that this type of control system requires.

== Death ==
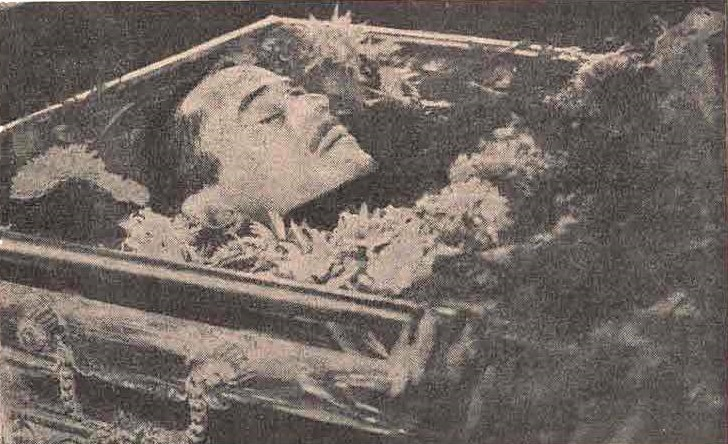
Vlaicu in his coffin

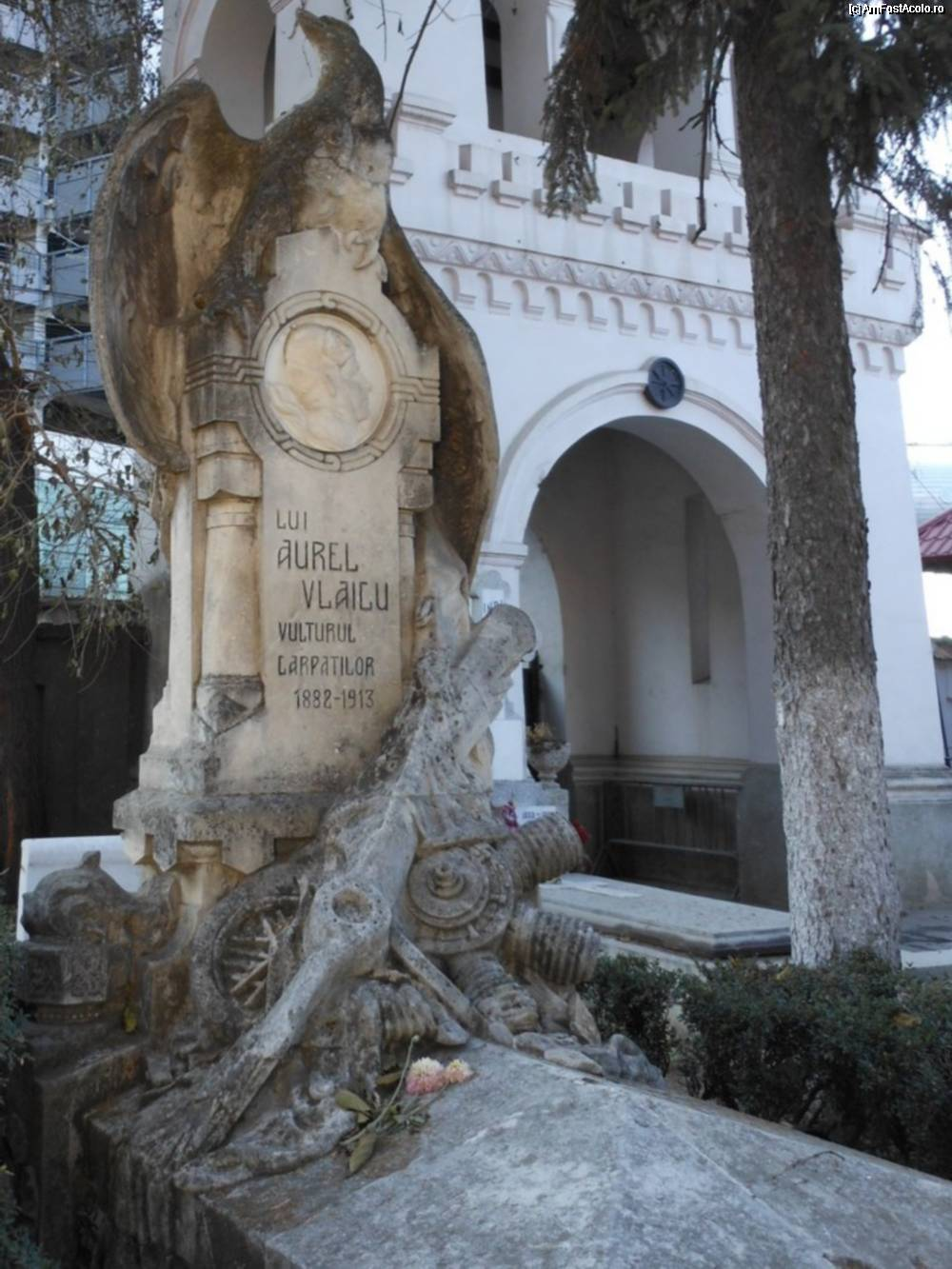
Vlaicu's tombstone in Bellu Cemetery

Aurel Vlaicu died on September 13, 1913, near Câmpina, on the outskirts of Bănești commune crashing his now aged A. Vlaicu Nr. II while attempting to be the first to fly across the Carpathian Mountains. He was expected to participate in the ASTRA festivities in Szászváros, near Bencenc.

He was buried on September 17, 1913, in Bellu Cemetery, in Bucharest. At his funeral he was awarded the Military Virtue Medal. In 1948, he was posthumously elected to the Romanian Academy.

The cause of Vlaicu's crash remains unknown. Vlaicu's friends Giovanni Magnani and Constantin Silisteanu dismissed claims of sabotage, the two being among the first to inspect the wreckage as they were following him in an automobile. The most plausible cause of Vlaicu's death was that the airplane stalled while landing with the engine off (as it was common practice at the time, landings were made with the engine off, however this made it difficult for the pilot to abort a misjudged landing).

== Legacy ==
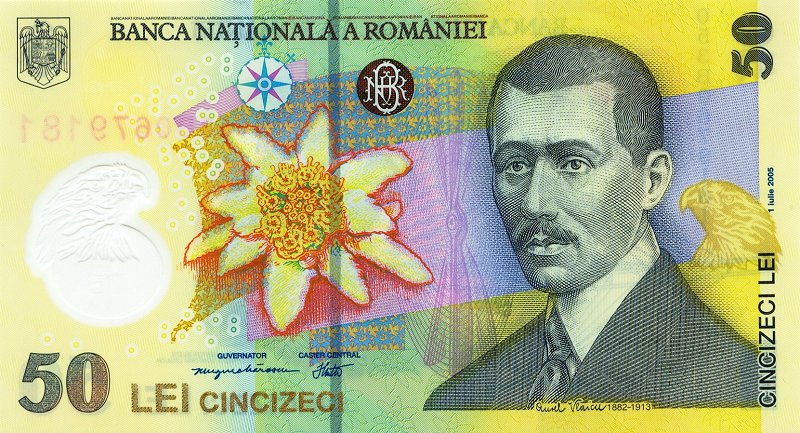
Aurel Vlaicu on the 50 lei bill

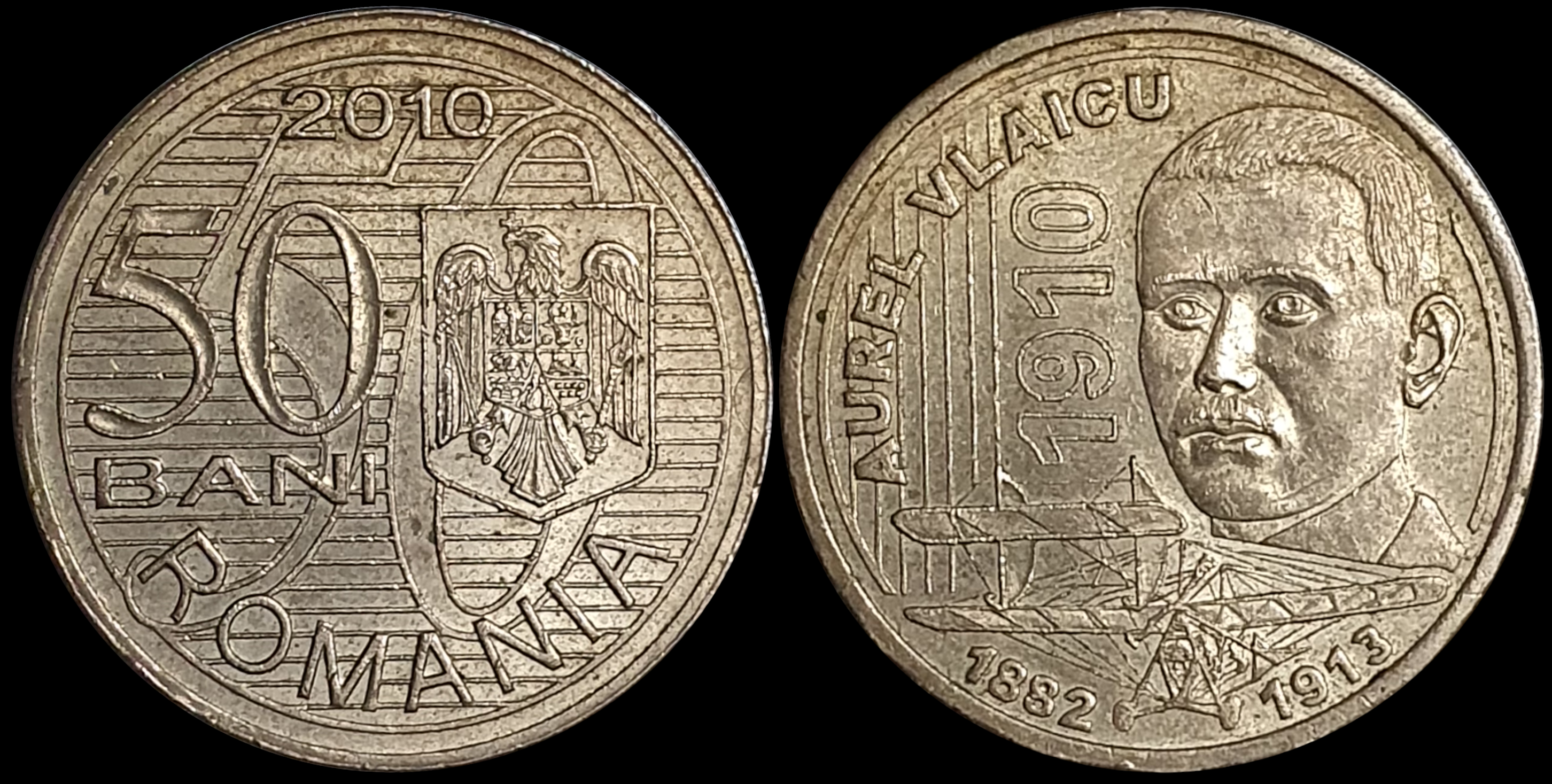
The 50 bani commemorative coin

17 June, the day of Aurel Vlaicu's first powered flight, is celebrated as The National Aviation Day of Romania.

His name is listed second on the Romanian Airmen Heroes Memorial in Bucharest, after Gheorghe Caranda and before his friend and fellow pilot, Gheorghe Negel, who died in an aircraft crash one month after Vlaicu, on October 11, 1913.

A museum was established in his home village, now named Aurel Vlaicu. and a monument was erected near Bănești where he crashed his plane.

The second largest airport in Romania, a TAROM Airbus A318-111 and the Aurel Vlaicu University, a public university founded in 1991 in Arad are all named after him.

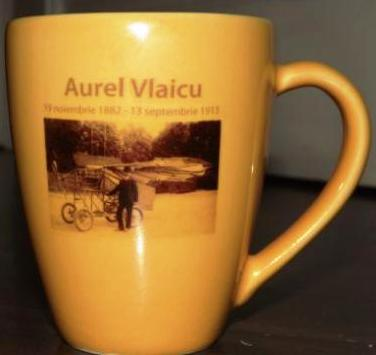
Erroneous commemorative mug

The 50 Romanian lei banknote has a portrait of Vlaicu on the obverse, and on the reverse a drawing of one of his airplanes and a cross-section of the airplane's engine.

A commemorative 50 bani coin was issued by the Romanian National Bank in 2010.

A Bucharest Metro train station, Aurel Vlaicu metro station is named in memory of him.

His life was the subject of the novels "Maistorașul Aurel, ucenicul lui Dumnezeu: Cronica vremii și vieții lui Vlaicu" by Victor Ion Popa (published in 1939) and "Flăcăul din Binținți" by Constantin Ghiban (published in 1953), and of a movie by Mircea Drăgan (released in 1978).

In 2010 a museum in Deva ordered several hundreds mugs to commemorate the 100th anniversary of Vlaicu's first powered flight. The mug designers used a pictured uploaded to Wikipedia showing another Romanian aviation pioneer, Traian Vuia, which was wrongly labelled as Aurel Vlaicu (Wikipedia upload picture name Aurel Vlaicu avionul). As of May 2018, the incorrect picture is still used on several websites.

== See also ==
- A Vlaicu I
- A Vlaicu II
- A Vlaicu III
- History of aviation
- Early flying machines
- List of early flying machines
- List of firsts in aviation
- List of aviation pioneers
- List of inventors killed by their own invention

== Bibliography ==
- Gheorghiu, Constantin C. (1960). Aurel Vlaicu, un precursor al aviaţiei româneşti. Bucharest: Editura Tehnică.
- Hundertmark, Michael; Steinle, Holger (1985). Phoenix aus der Asche – Die Deutsche Luftfahrt Sammlung Berlin. Berlin: Silberstreif Verlag. ISBN 978-3924091026.
- Taylor, Michael J.H. (1989). The Aerospace Chronology. London: Tri-Service Press. ISBN 978-1854880031.
