= Constantin Marin =

Romanian musician, conductor and composer

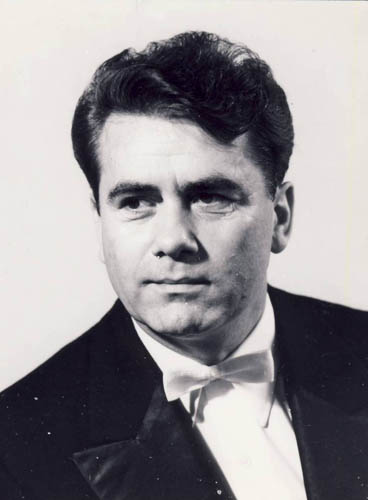

Background information
- Birth name: Constantin Marin
- Born: 27 February 1925; Urleta, Kingdom of Romania
- Died: 1 January 2011 (aged 85); Bucharest, Romania
- Occupation(s): Musician, composer, conductor

Constantin Marin (27 February 1925 – 1 January 2011) was a Romanian award-winning musician, conductor, and composer.

== Biography ==
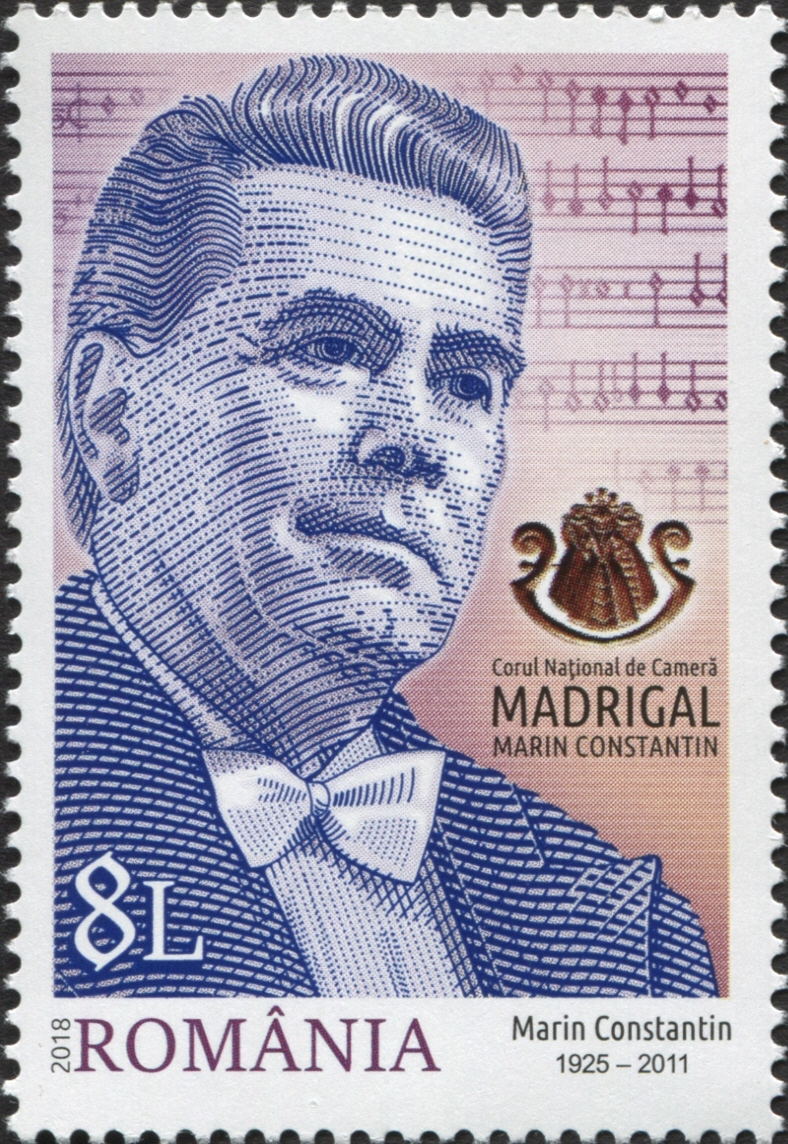
Marin on a 2018 stamp of Romania

Marin was born in Urleta, Prahova County, Romania. He was the founder in 1963 of the Madrigal Chamber Choir and had been its conductor and director ever since. He was well-known all over the world for his expertise on Renaissance music, Baroque, Gregorian songs and Traditional Romanian music. He was designated a UNESCO Goodwill Ambassador in 1992.

In 1971 he was awarded the Order of the Star of the Romanian Socialist Republic, 3rd class.
