= Aurel Vlaicu High School (Orăștie) =

- Colegiul National Aurel Vlaicu
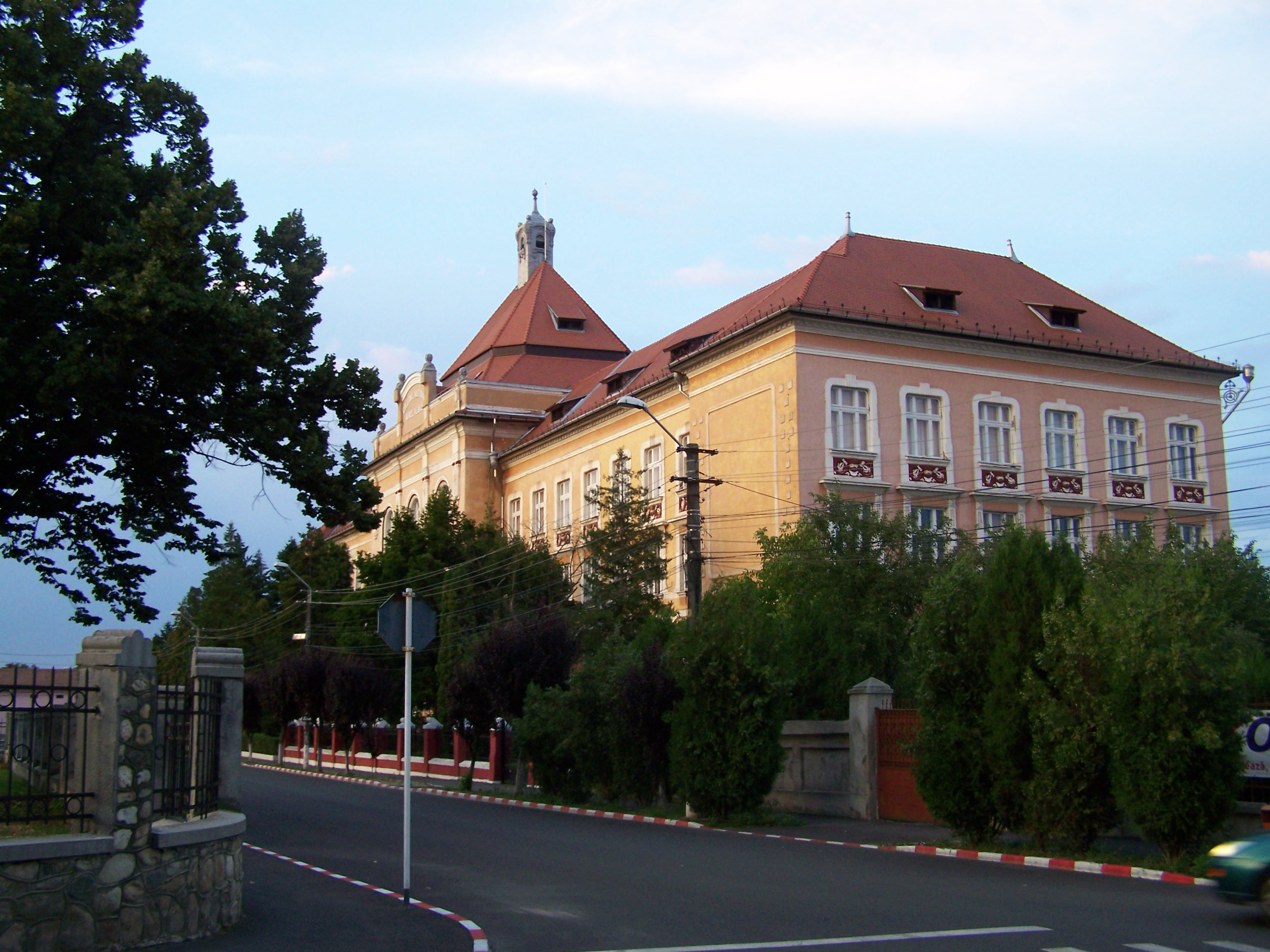

Location
- Strada Gheorghe Lazăr, Nr. 8 Orăștie, Hunedoara County; Romania
- Coordinates: 45°50′16″N 23°11′55″E

Information
- Funding type: Public
- Established: 1919; 107 years ago
- Status: Open
- Category: High School
- Principal: Chira Adriana
- Grades: 5 and 9 to 12
- Gender: coeducation
- Language: Romanian
- Campus type: Urban
- Website: colegiulavlaicu.ro

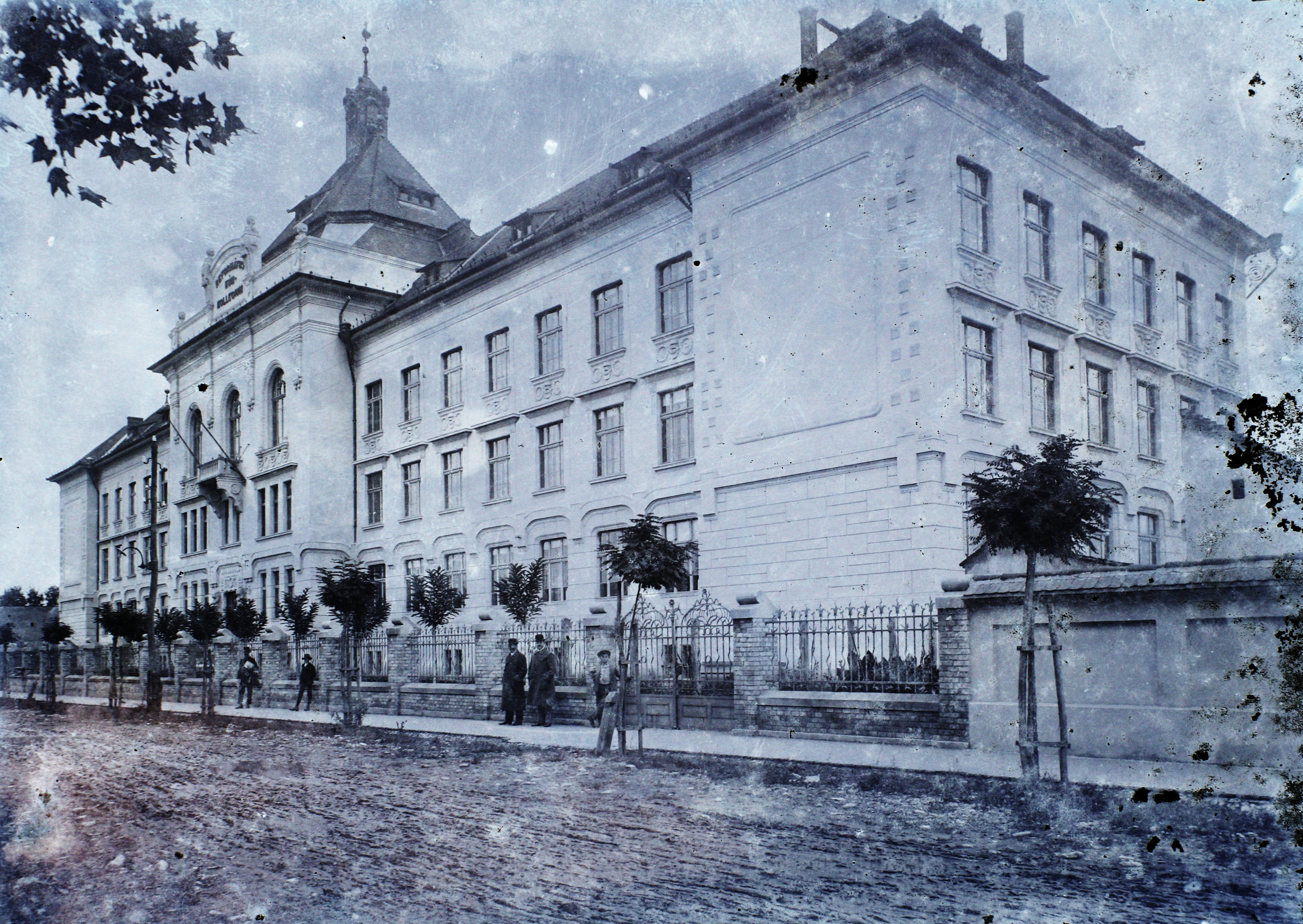
The building in 1908

Aurel Vlaicu High School (Romanian: Liceul Teoretic Aurel Vlaicu) is a high school located at 8 Gheorghe Lazăr Street, Orăștie, Romania.

The school was established in 1919, following the union of Transylvania with Romania, and was the first Romanian-language high school in Orăștie. Its founding resulted from the intransigent attitude of the Hungarian principal at the Reformed Church’s Kún Kocsárd College, who refused to record grades for Romanian language as a subject. This spurred students and local intellectuals to call for a separate institution, and every Romanian pupil from Kún defected to the new school, which had eight grades and was named for aviator Aurel Vlaicu. For two years, it operated out of the former state girls’ school. In autumn 1921, with 427 pupils causing overcrowding, it moved into an 1847 building that once belonged to the Reformed Church. Among the major donors of funds and educational materials were politicians Ioan Mihu, Aurel Vlad, and Petru Groza.

In October 1925, it entered the building of the Kún College, which had recently closed due to the lack of Hungarian students. The prefect of Hunedoara County seized the edifice, and the Romanian school moved in. It left two months later, following an appeal by Regency Hungary to the League of Nations. The move became permanent in 1928, when the Romanian state paid 8 million lei to the Reformed Church, which briefly revived the Hungarian high school in the 1847 building. Meanwhile, the rooster, symbol of the Reformed Church, was removed from atop the Kún building. Above the doorway was carved a bas-relief of Vlaicu, donated by his friend Octavian Goga, and the school's name was inscribed on the frontispiece.

In 1948, the new communist regime closed the school, using the building to house child refugees of the Greek Civil War. Additionally, a school for training chemical workers and locksmiths functioned inside from 1948 to 1954. That year, the high school reopened as a co-educational institution with ten grades. It was formally rededicated to Vlaicu in 1957, when a bronze sculpture was unveiled. Grade eleven was restored that year, with grade twelve following in 1965. In 1977, the school acquired a mechanics profile, part of the regime's drive for industrialization. This period ended in 1990, after the Romanian Revolution. The institution was declared a national college in 2000, but downgraded back to a high school in 2018.

The school building is listed as a historic monument by Romania's Ministry of Culture and Religious Affairs.
