= Bănești, Prahova =

Bănești
- Commune
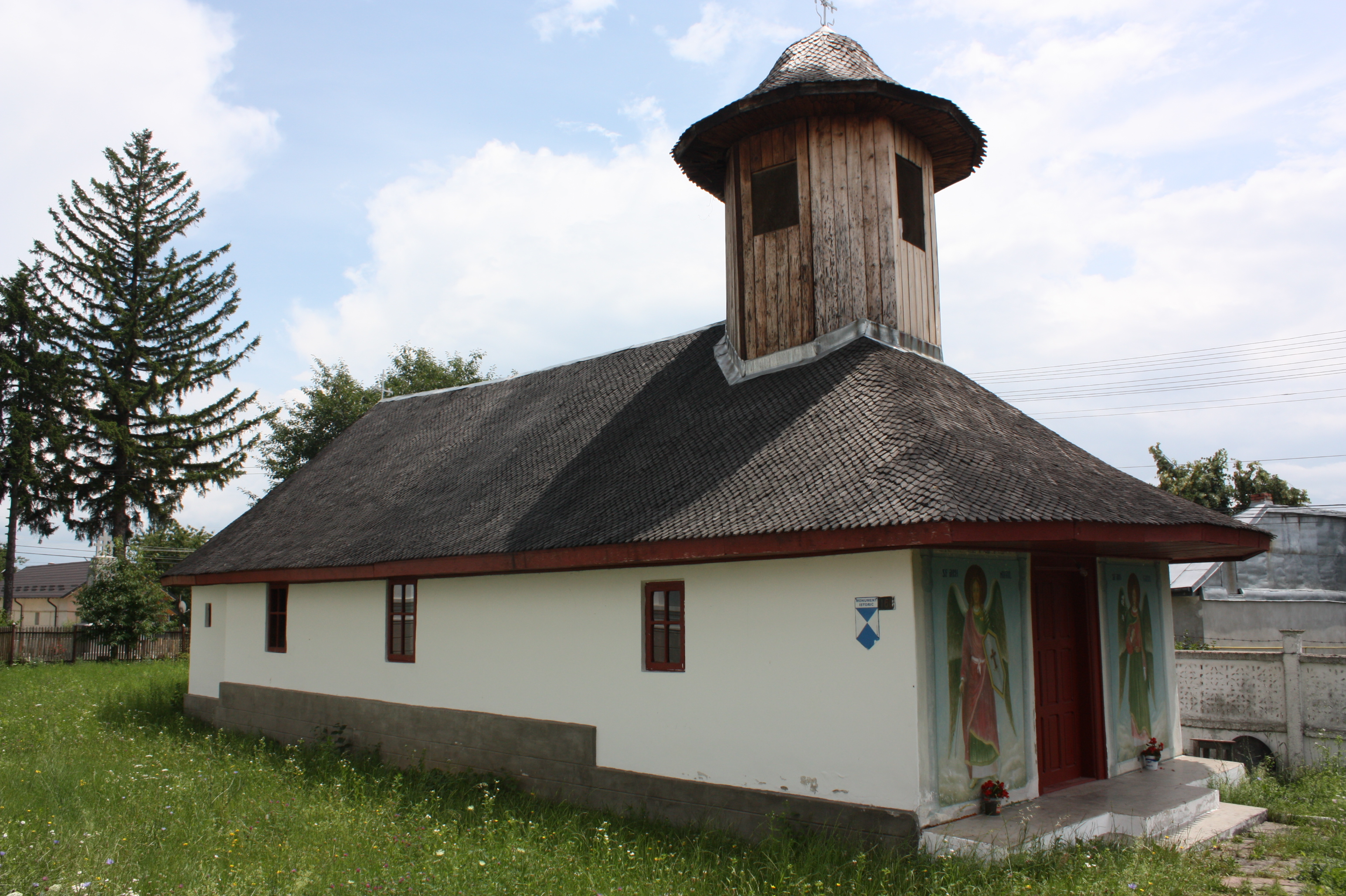
- Archangels' wooden church in Urleta

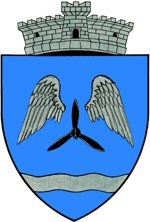
- Coat of arms

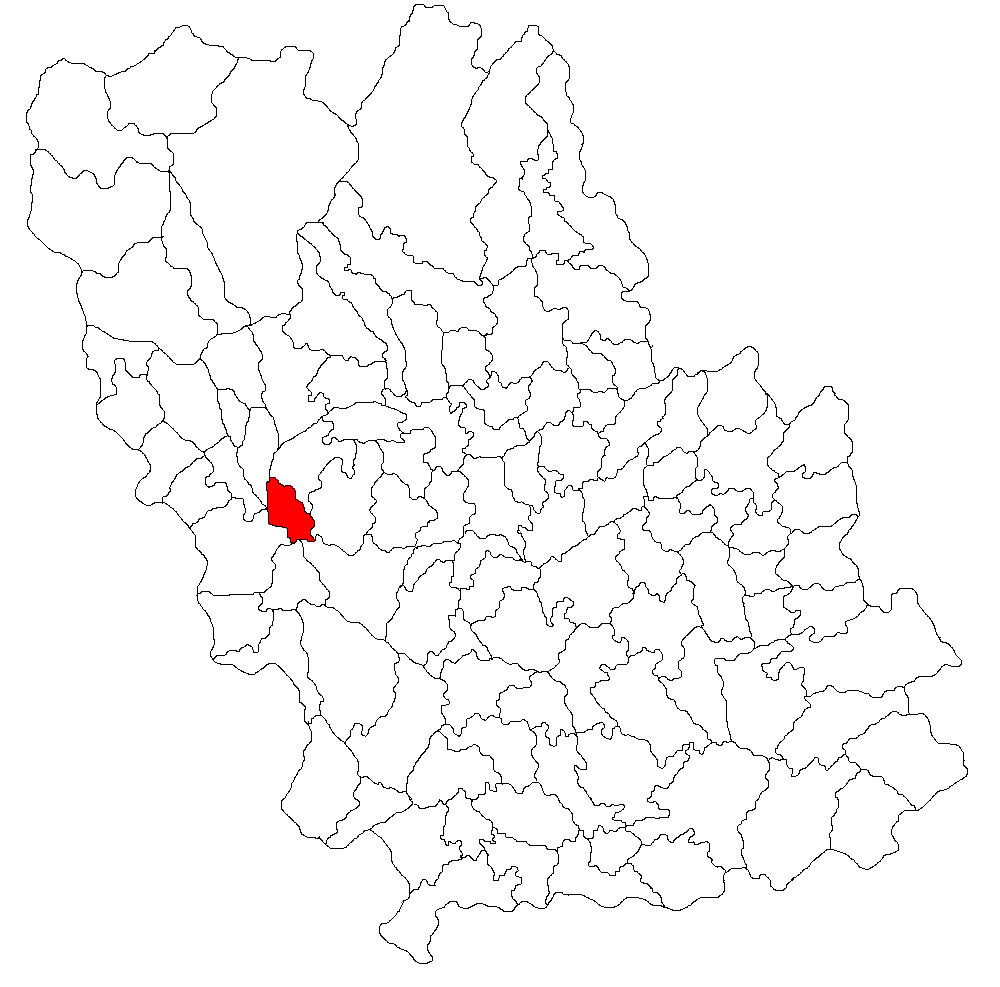
- Location in Prahova County

- Location in Romania
- Coordinates: 45°6′N 25°46′E
- Country: Romania
- County: Prahova

Government
  - Mayor (2020–2024): Gheorghe Stoica (PNL)
- Area: 21.56 km^{2} (8.32 sq mi)
- Elevation: 395 m (1,296 ft)
- Population (2021-12-01): 5,426
  - Density: 251.7/km^{2} (651.8/sq mi)
- Time zone: UTC+02:00 (EET)
  - Summer (DST): UTC+03:00 (EEST)
- Postal code: 107050
- Area code: +(40) 244
- Vehicle reg.: PH
- Website: primariabanesti.ro

Bănești is a commune in Prahova County, Muntenia, Romania. It is composed of two villages, Bănești and Urleta.

The commune is situated at the northern edge of the Wallachian Plain, at an altitude of 395 m (1,296 ft), in the foothills of the Southern Carpathians. It lies on the banks of the Prahova River and its left tributary, the Doftana River. It is located in the western part of Prahova County, just south of the city of Câmpina and 28 km (17 mi) northwest of the county seat, Ploiești. Bănești is crossed by national road DN1, which links Bucharest, 88 km (55 mi) to the south, with the northwestern part of the country.

On September 13, 1913, Aurel Vlaicu died on the outskirts of Bănești, crashing his A Vlaicu II plane while attempting to be the first to fly across the Carpathian Mountains.

Historical population
Year	Pop.	±%
1992	5,916	—
2002	5,733	−3.1%
2011	5,240	−8.6%
2021	5,426	+3.5%
Source: Census data

== Natives ==
- Constantin Marin (1925–2011), conductor, composer, founder of the Madrigal Chamber Choir

== Gallery ==
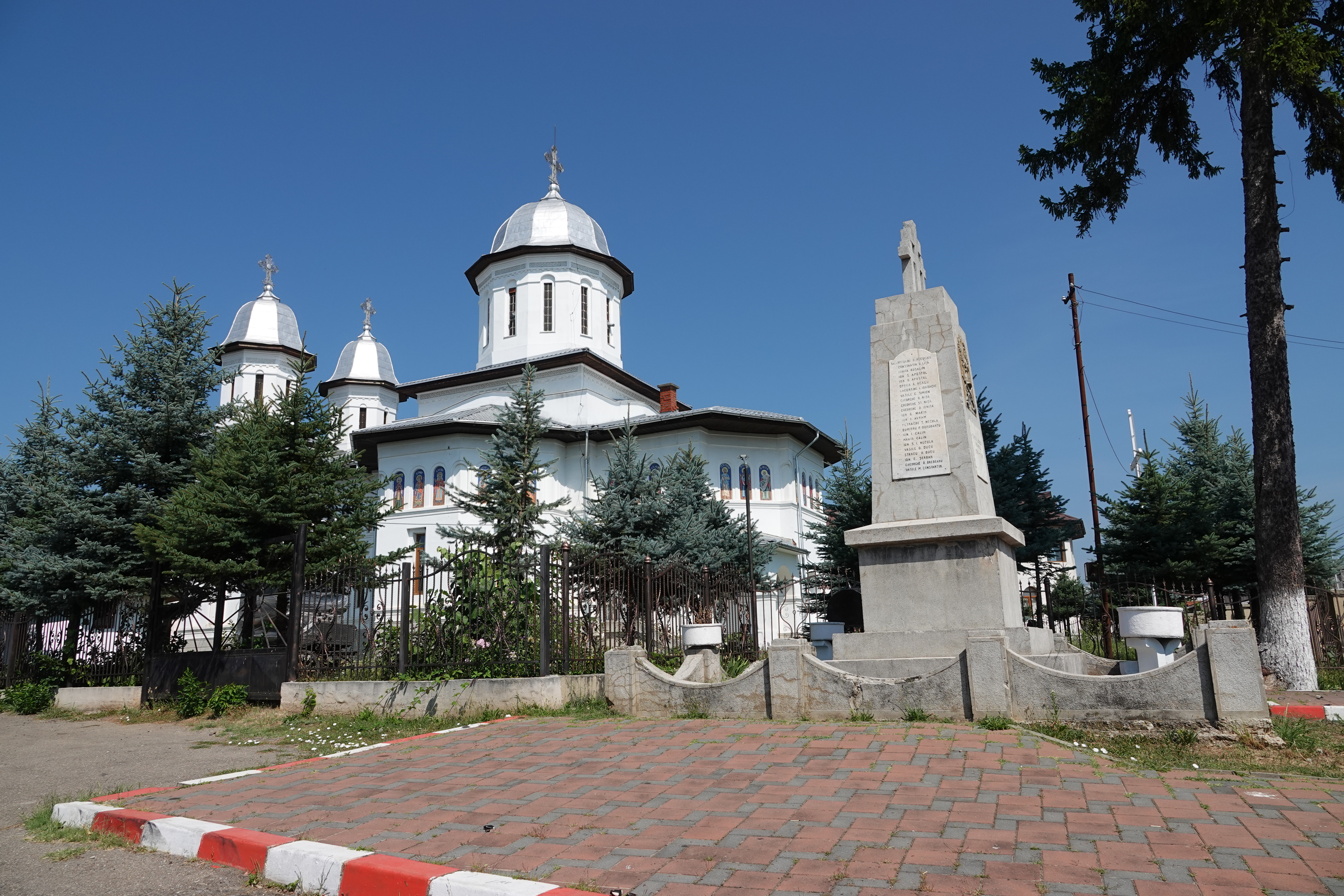
Holy Archangels parish church in Urleta
