= Giovanni Magnani =

Romanian-Italian entrepreneur (fl. 1913)

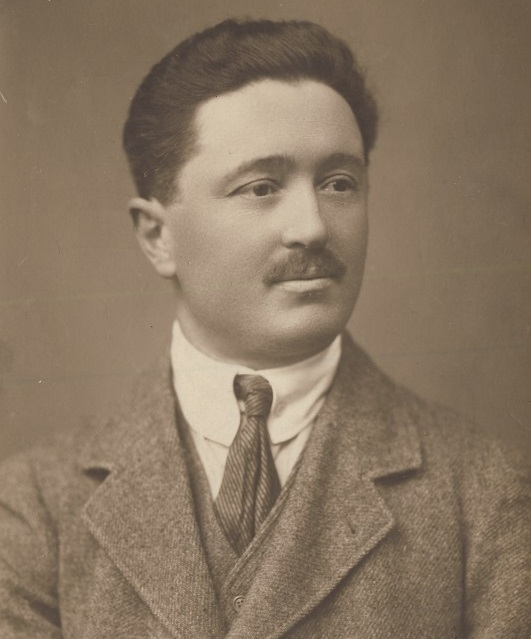
- Other name: Giani Magnani
- Known for: propeller manufacturer

Giovanni Magnani (fl. 1913) was a Romanian-Italian entrepreneur who lived in Bucharest at the beginning of the 20th century. In 1911, he fabricated a set of propellers for A Vlaicu II airplane, thus becoming the first propeller manufacturer in Southeast Europe.

Before meeting Aurel Vlaicu, Magnani built around 1910 in Bucharest an ornithopter that never flew.

After Vlaicu's death, one of the two A Vlaicu III airplanes on order from for Marconi Company was completed by Magnani and Constantin Silisteanu, and was tested in 1914 by pilot Petre Macavei on Cotroceni airfield.

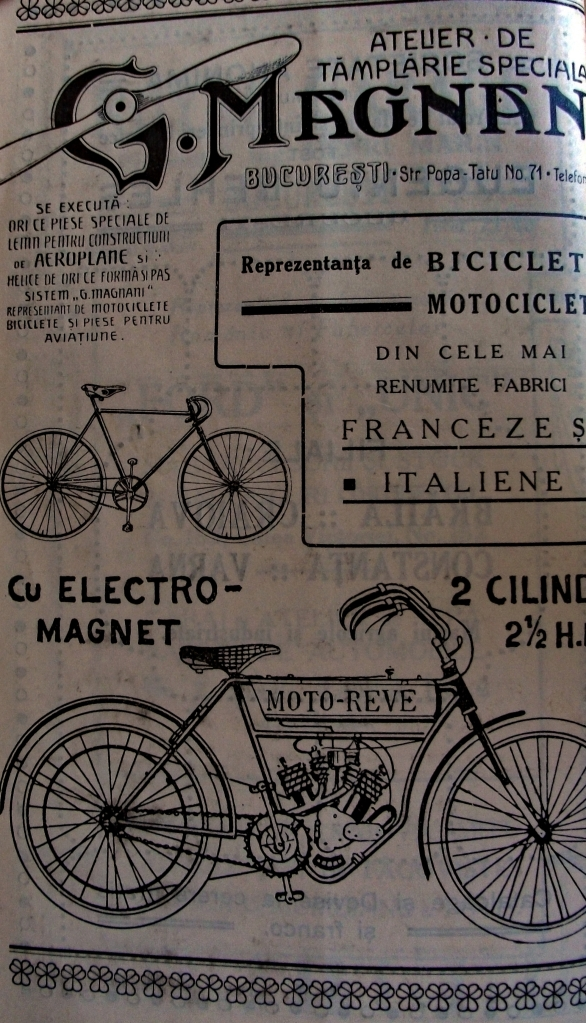
Giovanni Magnani advertisement

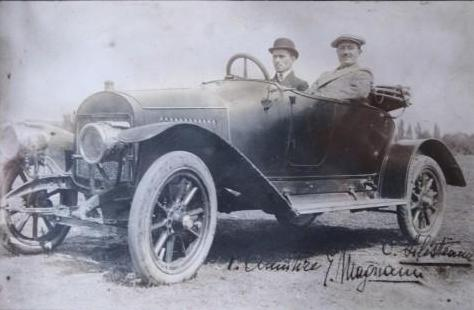
Magnani in the driver seat next to Constantin Silisteanu

== See also ==
- Aurel Vlaicu
- A Vlaicu II
- A Vlaicu III
- Husqvarna Motorcycles
