= A Vlaicu II =

1911 monoplane built by Aurel Vlaicu

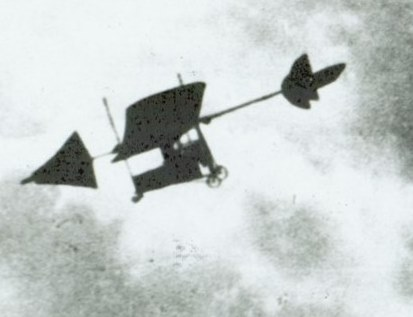

General information
- Type: Monoplane
- Manufacturer: Arts and Crafts School in Bucharest
- Designer: Aurel Vlaicu
- Number built: 1

History
- First flight: April 1911
- Developed from: A Vlaicu I

The A Vlaicu II was the second and last powered airplane designed and built by Aurel Vlaicu.

== Design and development ==
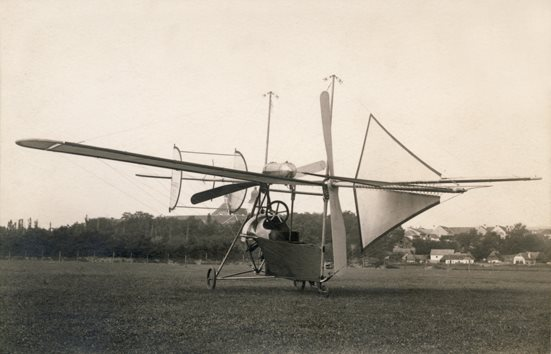
A. Vlaicu Nr. II viewed from behind.

The construction of A. Vlaicu Nr. II was started in December 1910 at the Școala de Arte și Meserii (Arts and Crafts School) in Bucharest, on a budget of 16,000 lei. It was an improved version of Vlaicu's earlier airplane, the A. Vlaicu Nr. I.

The A. Vlaicu Nr. II first flew in April 1911 on Cotroceni airfield in Bucharest.

== Operational history ==
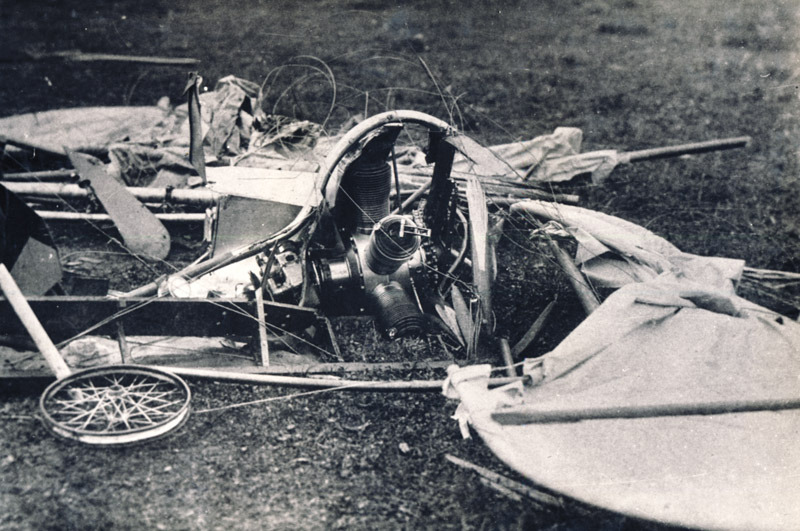
A. Vlaicu II wreckage at Bănești

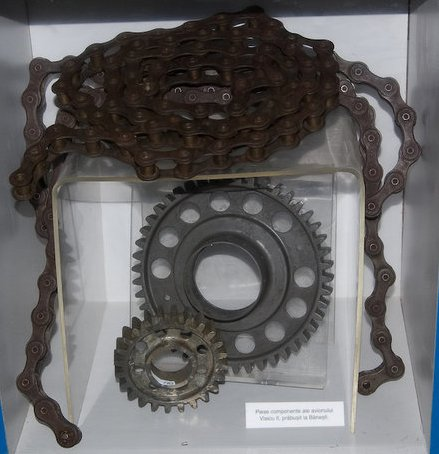
Parts of A. Vlaicu II airplane recovered from the crash site

Between 23 and 30 June 1912 Vlaicu flew the A. Vlaicu Nr. II at the Die Internationale Flugwoche at Aspern near Vienna, competing against 42 other aviators including Roland Garros. Vlaicu won prizes totaling 7,500 Austro-Hungarian krone for precision landing, projectile throwing and tight flying around a pole. The competition number of the A. Vlaicu Nr. II was 38, painted on the left wing and stabilizer.

On return from Aspern he performed demonstration flights throughout Transylvania at Arad, Lugoj, Hațeg, Orăștie, Vršac, Alba Iulia, Săliște, Târgu Mureș and Dumbrăveni. The year before he flew at Blaj, Sibiu, Brașov, Iași and Cernăuți.

During the 1912-1913 Balkan Wars, Aurel Vlaicu flew reconnaissance missions south of Danube in the aircraft.

It was destroyed on 13 September 1913, in the crash that cost Aurel Vlaicu his life, when he attempted to make the first flight across the Carpathian Mountains. Parts from the wreckage are preserved in several Romanian museums: the Aurel Vlaicu Memorial House, the National Military Museum in Bucharest and the Aviation Museum in Bucharest.

== Modern replicas ==
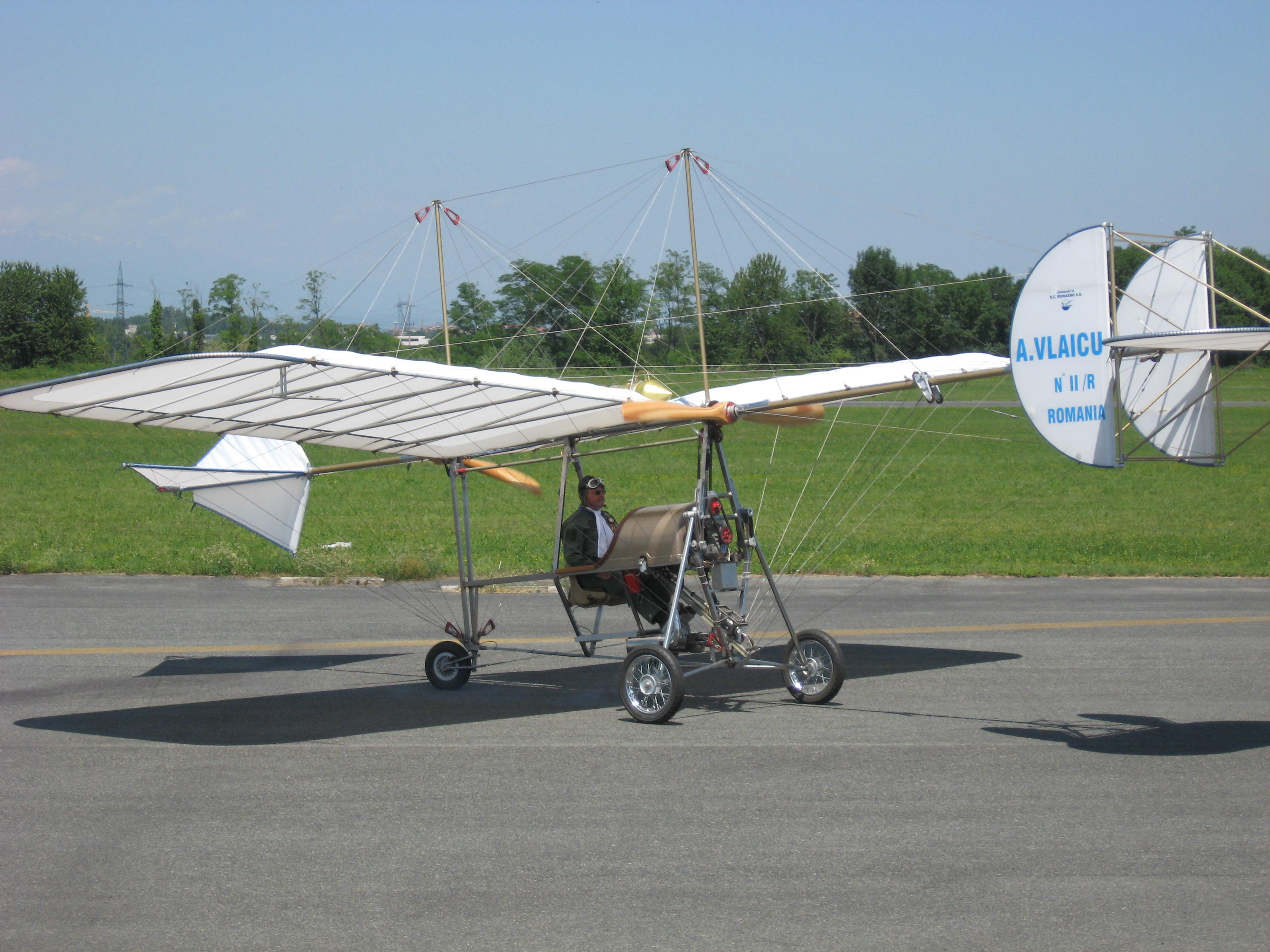
A Vlaicu II 2008 replica.

Between 2004 and 2008 a replica of the A Vlaicu II airplane was built by Fundația Aerospațială Română and Romaero in Bucharest on a budget of approximately €200,000. The airplane uses a 100 hp contemporary engine and other modern materials. Its flight controls, engine-propeller transmission, wing frame and rear stabilizer have been modified compared to the original airplane. It was displayed at various commemorative events. In 2009 it won a bronze medal at the World Air Games (WAG) in Turin. As of 2014 the airplane has not been tested in flight.

Other scale models have been built during the last 50 years by amateurs and are on display at various Romanian museums, and in the departure hallway of the Henri Coandă International Airport in Bucharest.

== Specifications (military) ==
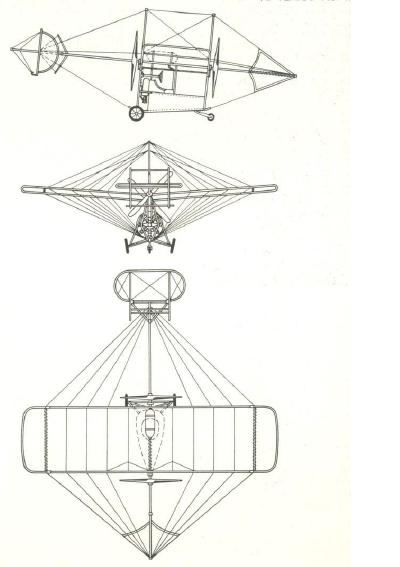

Data from

General characteristics

- Crew: 1
- Length: 11.2 m (36 ft 9 in)
- Wingspan: 10 m (32 ft 10 in)
- Height: 4.2 m (13 ft 9 in)
- Wing area: 30 m^{2} (320 sq ft)
- Gross weight: 300 kg (661 lb)
- Powerplant: 1 × Gnome Omega air-cooled rotary piston engine, 37 kW (50 hp)
- Propellers: (2 coaxial, counter-rotating) 2-bladed Magnani/Garuda, 2.4 m (7 ft 10 in) diameter

Performance

- Maximum speed: 110 km/h (68 mph, 59 kn)
- Service ceiling: 1,000 m (3,300 ft)

== See also ==
- Aurel Vlaicu
- A Vlaicu I
- A Vlaicu III
