= A Vlaicu III =

1914 monoplane built by Aurel Vlaicu

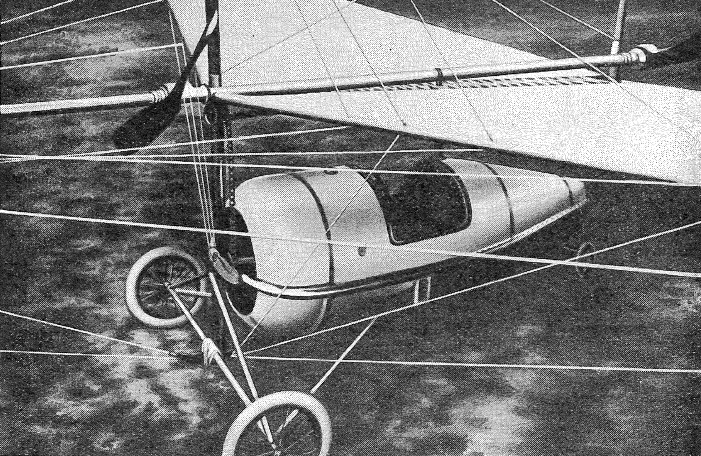

General information
- Type: Monoplane
- Designer: Aurel Vlaicu
- Number built: 1

History
- First flight: 1914
- Developed from: A Vlaicu II

The A Vlaicu III was the world's first metal-built aircraft, designed and built in Romania prior to World War I. It was the third powered aircraft designed by pioneering Romanian aviator Aurel Vlaicu.

== Design and development ==
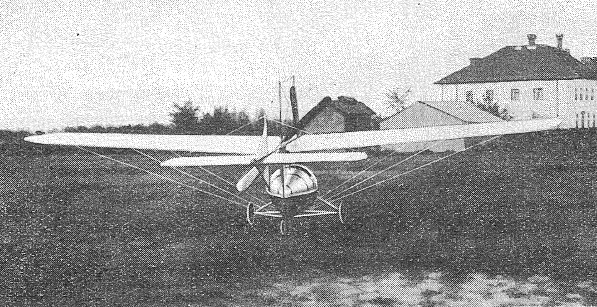

Engineer and inventor Aurel Vlaicu, who was among the first pilots in Romania, began the design of the third in his series of powered aircraft in the second half of 1911. The design was based on his earlier A Vlaicu II. A nacelle underneath a parasol wing housed the pilot and a Gnome Gamma engine. Gears, chains and shafts drove two propellers, one in front of and one behind the wing; these turned in opposite directions to cancel each other's torque. Like Vlaicu's other designs, the A. Vlaicu III did not have ailerons. The pilot turned the aircraft by using the rudder, controlled by moving a tiller left or right; to control the elevators and make the aircraft go up and down, a steering wheel attached to the tiller was turned left or right.

At the time of Vlaicu's death in the crash of the A Vlaicu II in 1913, two A. Vlaicu IIIs were under construction for delivery to the Marconi Company. The British company was supposed to receive one for performance evaluation and experimentation with aerial radio, the other was supposed to remain in Romania. After Vlaicu's death, one of the two aircraft was completed by his friends Giovanni Magnani and Constantin Silisteanu; and was ready to fly in May 1914.

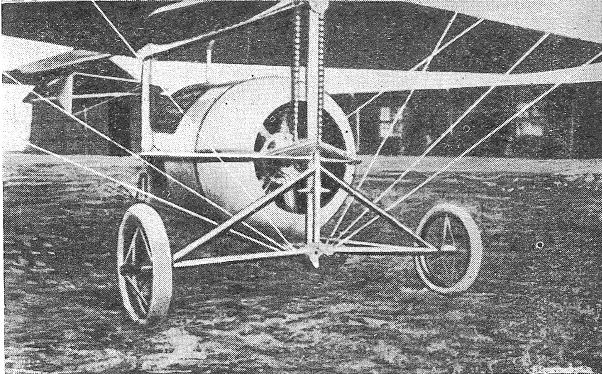

== Operational history ==
Two test 'hops' covering a ground distance of 200–300 metres (220-330 yards) at a maximum altitude of about 2 metres (6.6 ft) were made in 1914 by pilot Petre Macavei at Cotroceni airfield. Military authorities of the time refused permission to continue the tests. At a later date, pilots Mircea Zorileanu and Gheorghe Negrescu obtained permission from the Romanian Minister of War to modify the controls of the aircraft and continue the experiments, but it never flew again.

In 1916, during the German occupation of Bucharest, an A Vlaicu III was seized and shipped to Germany. It was last seen in 1942 at an aviation exhibition in Berlin by Romanian military officers. However, no mention of it is made in records of the Berlin exhibition.

== Specifications ==
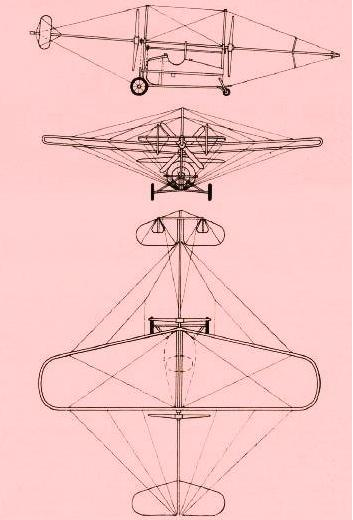

Data from

General characteristics

- Crew: 2
- Length: 10.75 m (35 ft 3 in)
- Wingspan: 10 m (32 ft 10 in)
- Height: 3.1 m (10 ft 2 in)
- Wing area: 24 m^{2} (260 sq ft)
- Gross weight: 575 kg (1,268 lb)
- Powerplant: 1 × Gnome Gamma air-cooled rotary piston engine, 52 kW (70 hp)
- Propellers: (2 coaxial, counter-rotating) 2-bladed, 2.55 m (8 ft 4 in) diameter

Performance

== See also ==
- Aurel Vlaicu
- A Vlaicu I
- A Vlaicu II
