= Gheorghe Caranda =

Romanian army officer

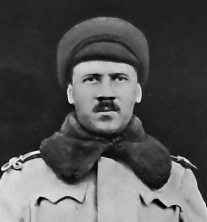
- Born: April 21, 1884; Iași, Romania
- Died: June 20, 1912 (aged 28); Bucharest, Romania
- Occupation: Army Officer
- Known for: first Romanian plane crash casualty

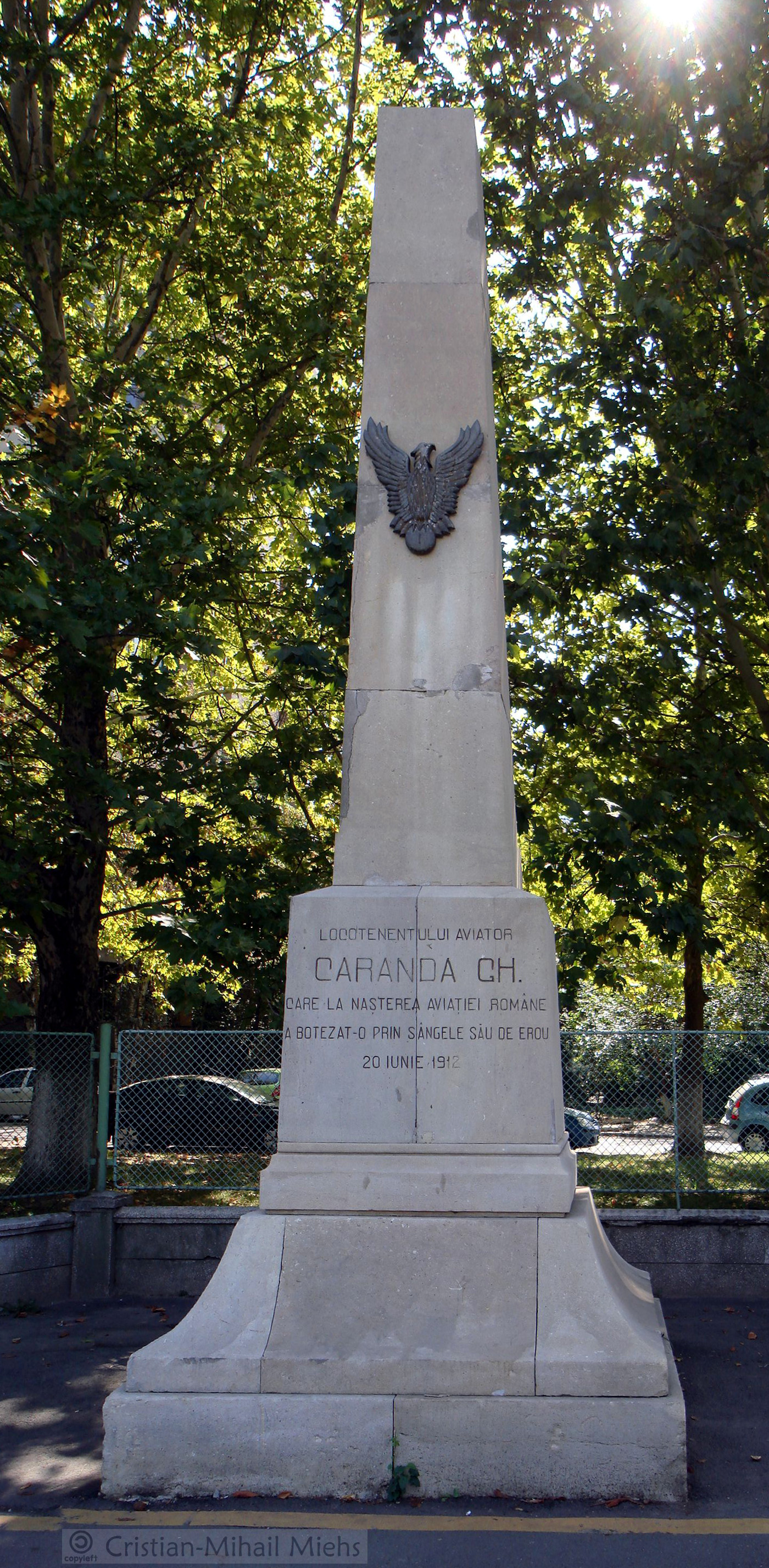
Obelisk in Bucharest commemorating Caranda's death

Gheorghe Caranda (April 21, 1884 – June 20, 1912) was a Romanian army officer and early aviator. He registered at Cotroceni Piloting School founded by George Valentin Bibescu in 1911, and earned his pilot license in 1912.

On June 20, 1912 he crashed his biplane and died on Cotroceni field in Bucharest, thus becoming the first Romanian airplane accident fatality. The Farman III airplane was among those used at Chitila Piloting School, and reportedly had a longitudinal stability problem, and in addition the engine was under-performing on the day of the accident.

Caranda received the Military Virtue Medal posthumously and his name is listed first on the Romanian Airmen Heroes Memorial in Bucharest, before that of aircraft builder and pilot Aurel Vlaicu.
