= Fifty bani =

- Romania
- Value: 0.50 Romanian leu
- Mass: 6.1 g
- Diameter: 23.75 mm
- Thickness: 1.9 mm
- Edge: Plain, inscribed ROMANIA * ROMANIA *
- Composition: Copper 80%, Zinc 15%, Nickel 5%
- Years of minting: 1873, 1876, 1881, 1884-1885, 1894, 1900-1901, 1910-1912, 1914, 1921, 1955-56, 2005-present

Obverse
- Design: 'ROMANIA', value, Coat of arms
- Design date: 2012

Reverse
- Design: Neagoe Basarab, Curtea de Argeș Cathedral
- Design date: 2012

The fifty-bani coin is a coin of the Romanian leu. The fifty-bani is also the only coin of Romania to not be steel-based, but be made completely of an alloy, and was also the first coin in the country to have a written inscription on its edge, with the introduction of 4 new coins in 2019.

In addition to Romania, the coin has been minted in the United Kingdom (1867), Belgium (1894, 1910–1912 and 1914), Germany (1900–1901, 1910–1911 and 1914), Switzerland (1921), Hungary (1947), and Russia (1952).

== History ==
=== Principality of Romania ===
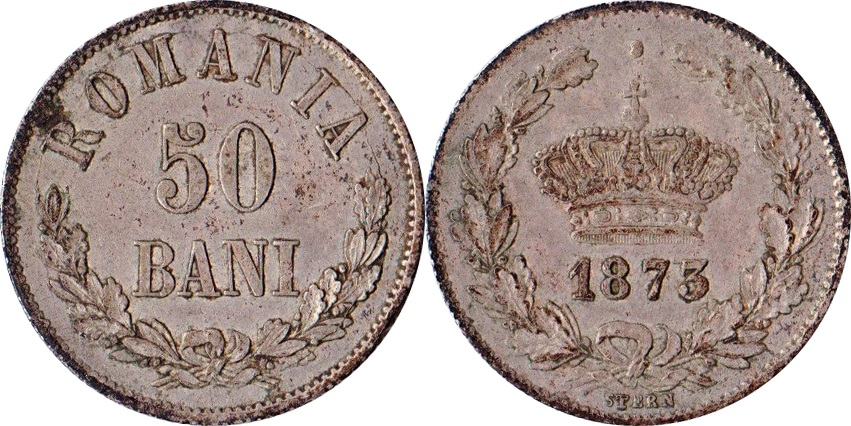
50 bani coin from 1873

A fifty-bani coin was not included in Romania's first set of decimal coins, minted in 1867 in Birmingham, England. The denomination was introduced in 1873 as a coin of 18mm diameter and weighing 2.5g. It was 83.5% silver and 16.5% copper. The obverse featured the Romanian crown and the date underneath, within a wreath of laurel and oak branches. Below the wreath was the name STERN of the engraver, and at the top of the coin was the mintmark of the mint in Brussels, Belgium, where it was struck. The mintmark was the portrait of Brussels' patron saint, Saint Michael. The reverse had the name of the country and the denomination within a smaller wreath of the same appearance. In 1873 4.81 million of the coin were issued. The only other year of mintage was 1876 with 2,116,980 from the same mint. The coin was known in the Romanian region of Moldavia (now the nation of Moldova) as a Dutcă, after silver coins of Poland and Russia which circulated in Romania. In the region of Walachia, it was known as a băncutjă.

The second fifty-bani was the first to feature a Romanian monarch. It was struck only in 1881 and to the same specifications as the first version. The obverse featured a portrait of Carol I of Romania facing left. His inscription was CAROL I DOMNUL ROMANIEI (Carol I Prince of the Romanians) and the engraver's surname, Kullrich, was written below. The reverse featured the Romanian coat of arms, with the date split on each side. The country's name was above the arms and the denomination below. Below the coat of arms on the left was a 'V' mintmark of Vienna, Austria where all of the 1,000,000 coins were minted. Below on the right was a grain of wheat, representing Bucharest's mint.

=== Kingdom of Romania ===
In 1884, a third fifty-bani commenced minting in Bucharest, Romania's capital, with the same dimensions and composition of the previous two. The obverse of Carol I now had the inscription CAROL I REGE AL ROMANIEI (Carol I King of the Romanians). The reverse had the denomination and date in a wreath of laurel and oak. One million were issued, with or without the 'B' mintmark. In 1885, 200,000 of the coin were issued, and the portrait was very slightly different.

A fourth fifty-bani was struck in 1894 in Brussels, Belgium with the same specifications. The new portrait of Carol I was sculpted by an A. SCHARFF whose name featured below. In 1894, 600,000 were issued. The coin's next strike was 1900, and 3.838 million were minted in Hamburg, Germany. These coins, and the 194,205 struck at the same city in the following year, had a wider diameter at 18.5mm.

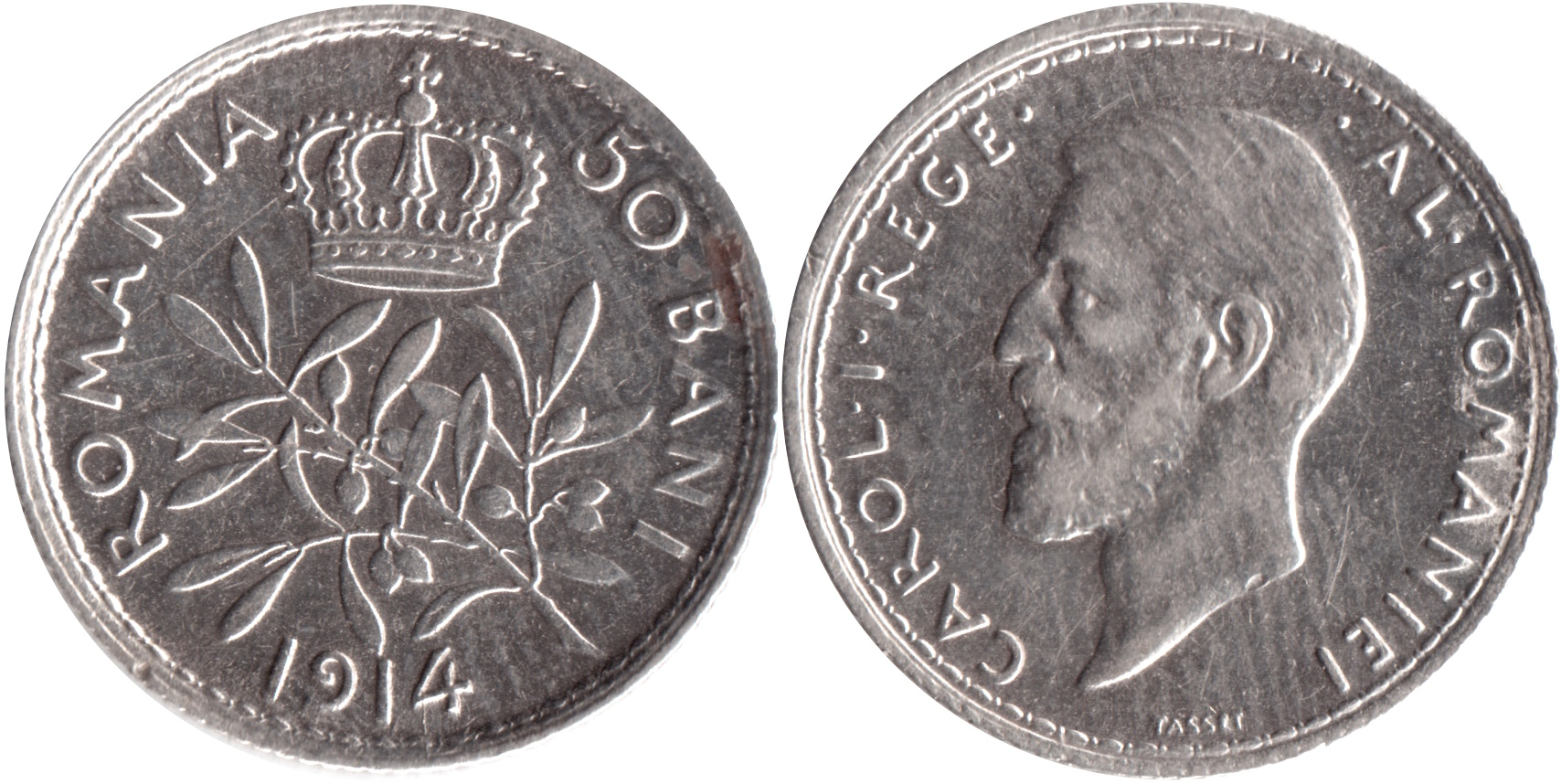
50 bani coin from 1914

The fifth coin of the denomination had a minting run from 1910 to 1914 (excluding 1913). It maintained the 18mm diameter of the previous fifty-bani coins and kept the same composition. The coins were minted at Brussels and Hamburg, the difference being that the Brussels-struck coins had 101 reeds on the edge compared to 120 from Hamburg. A new sculptor, Tasset, put his name beneath the portrait of Carol I on the obverse. The reverse featured the crown of Romania above olive branches, with the country's name on the left, the denomination on the right and the date below. Although not a member of the Latin Monetary Union, Romania agreed to its weights and measured which aimed to create a universal currency around Europe. The fifty-bani of 1910-1914 shares many similarities with the French ½ Franc of the same time.

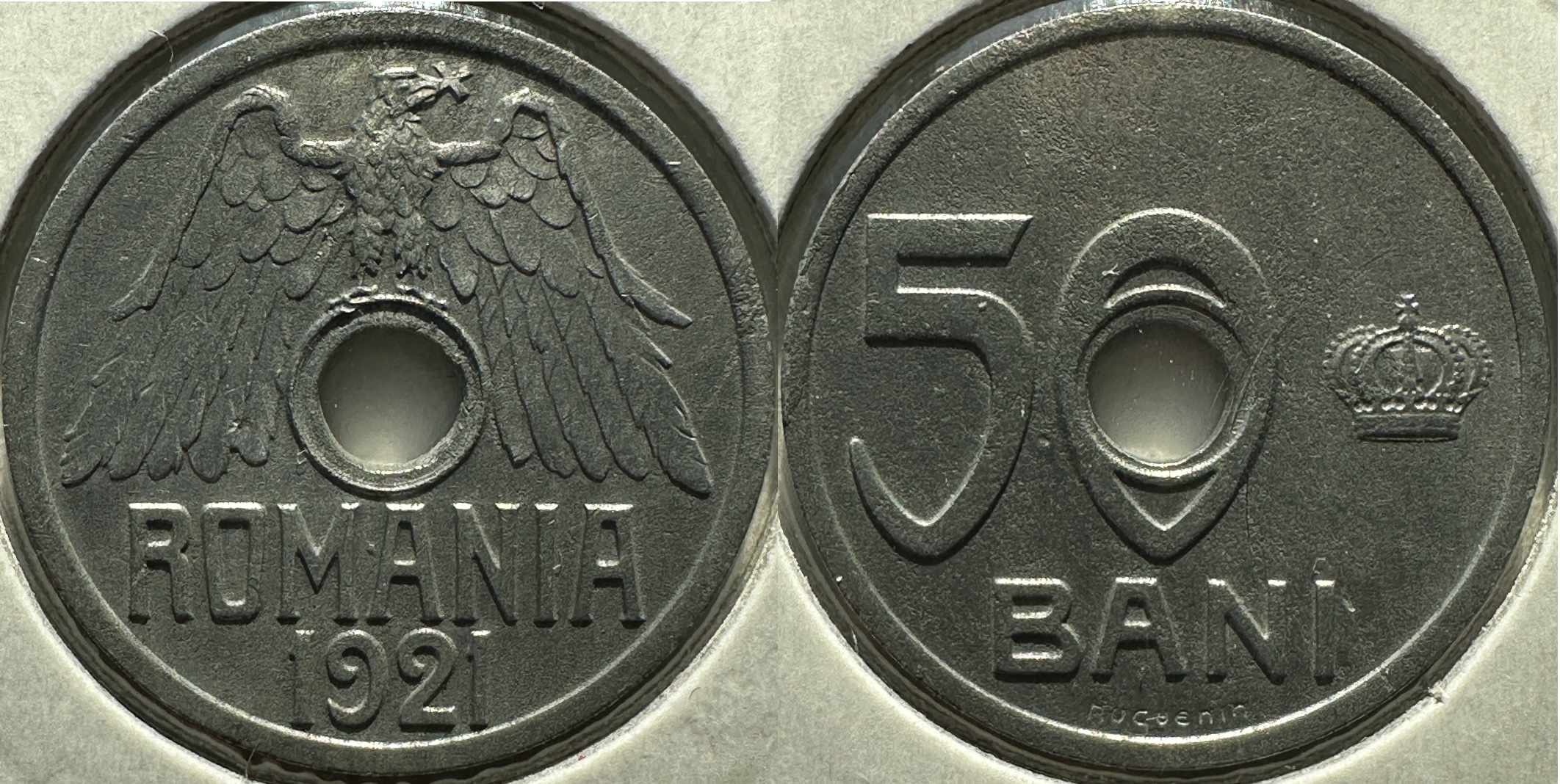
50 bani coin from 1921

A sixth fifty-bani was minted exclusively in 1921, with 30 million produced in Le Locle, Switzerland by the company Huguenin Frères (brothers) & Co. The coin was 21mm in diameter with a hole in the middle, and weighed 1.203 g due to being made entirely from aluminium. The hole was 4 mm or 4.5 mm depending on the piece. On the obverse was the eagle from the Romanian coat of arms, with a Christian cross in his beak, perched on top of the hole. The country's name is underneath. On the reverse was the denomination, with the 0 in 50 surrounding the hole. The Romanian crown was placed to the right of the hole. The mintmark Huguenin was placed at the bottom of the reverse.

After a monetary reform on 15 August 1947, 20,000 old lei became a new leu, and a fifty-bani coin was briefly re-introduced. It measured 16mm in diameter and weighed 1.7g. The coin was made of 80% copper, 19% zinc and 1% nickel. Its obverse featured the Romanian crown in the centre, with the country name at the top and date at the bottom. The reverse featured the denomination. The coin was minted in Bucharest and Budapest, Hungary, to an extent of 13.4 million coins. On 30 December 1947 however, the monarchy of Romania was forced out by communists.

=== People's Republic of Romania ===
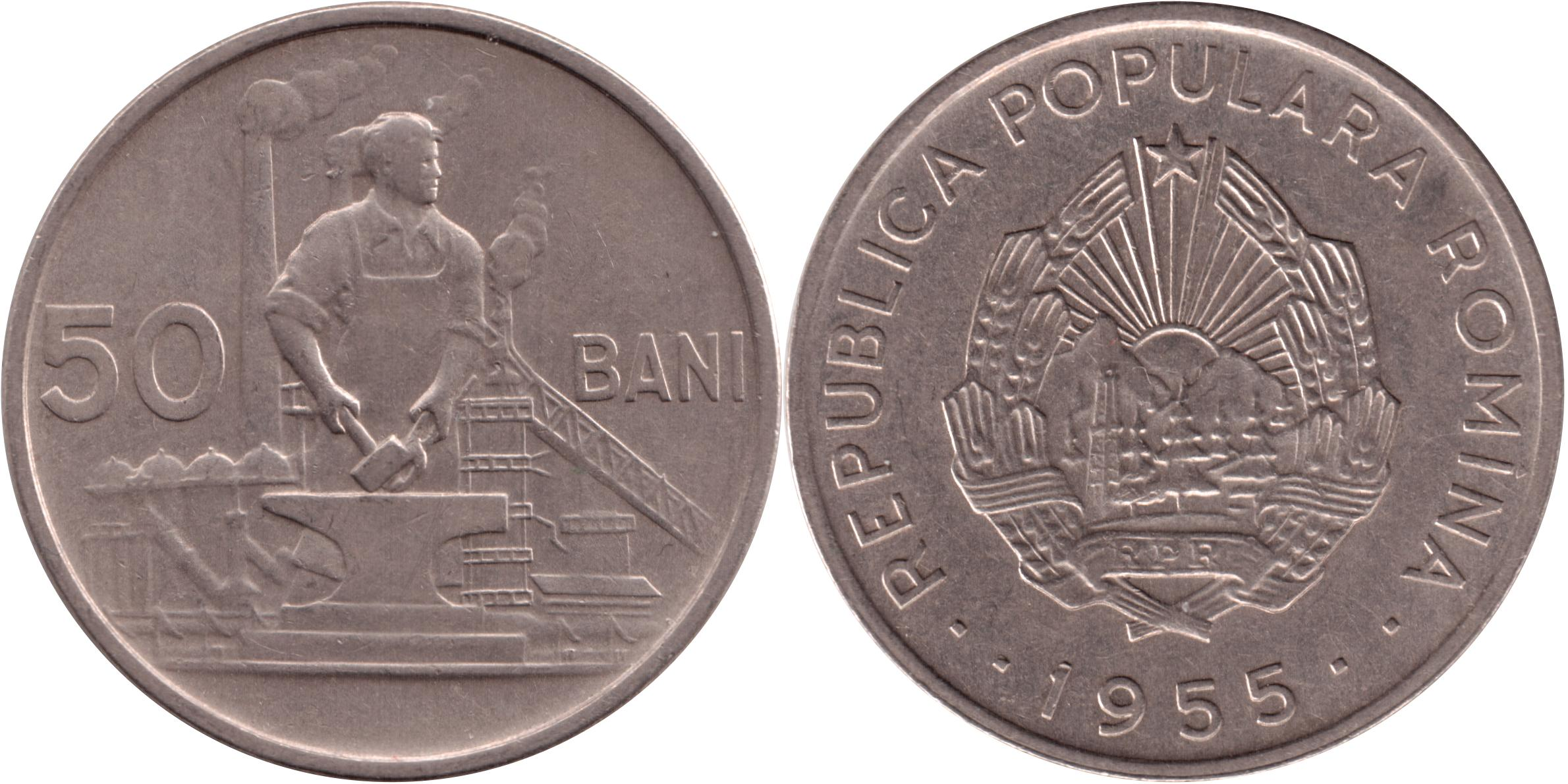
50 bani coin from 1955

The only time during the communist rule of Romania that a fifty bani was minted was in 1955–56 during the People's Republic of Romania. The coin was 25 mm in diameter, weighed 4.55 g and was made of cupro-nickel. The obverse featured the communist coat of arms of Romania and the inscription around it REPUBLICA POPULARA ROMÎNA (Romanian People's Republic). Despite the circumflex on the 'I' in 'ROMINA', the inscription was inaccurate, as accents should have been placed on the 'A' in 'POPULARA' and 'ROMINA'. The reverse featured a male worker making tongs on an anvil, with a background of smoking chimneys, conveyor belts and silos. The denomination was split either side of the image. The coin was produced in Bucharest, with 16.7 million in 1955 and 11.4 million in 1956.

=== Romania ===
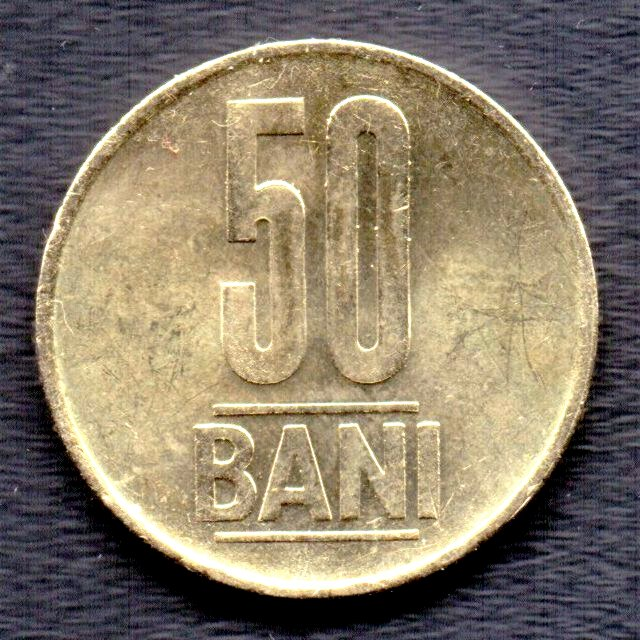
Obverse

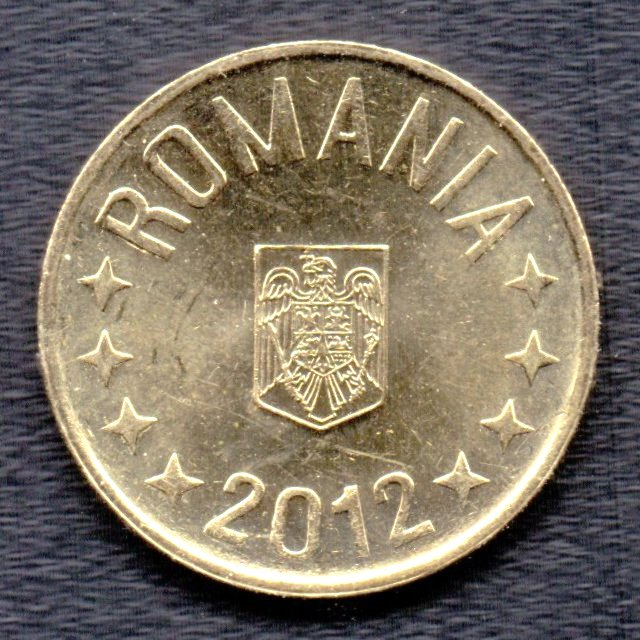
Reverse

Original (2005 - present) issue

On 1 July 2005, Romania redenominated its currency at the rate of 10,000 old lei to 1 new leu. The new fifty-bani coin thus replaced the old 5,000 lei coin which had been the largest denomination. Early versions of the coin from 2005 are 0.15mm narrower in diameter, at 23.6mm. The coin was sold to large shops in rolls of fifty coins.

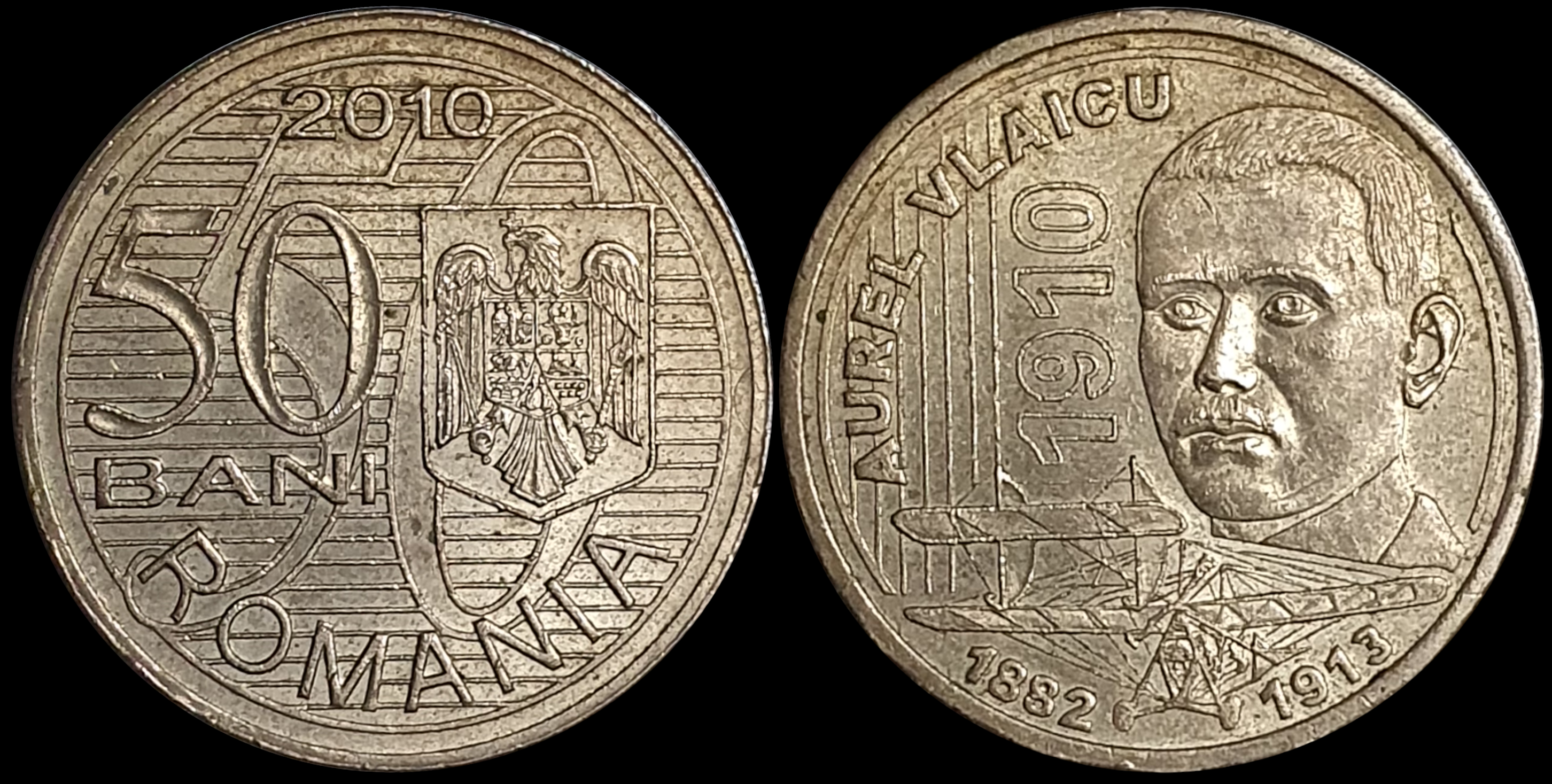

First side of the image: Obverse
Second side of the image: Reverse
Aurel Vlaicu (2010) issue

A commemorative coin featuring Romanian aeronautical pioneer Aurel Vlaicu was released on 25 October 2010 to mark the centennial of his first flight in 1910. The obverse featured Vlaicu's portrait with his name on the top-left corner with the date 1910. His plane was placed at the bottom with the years of his life, 1882-1913. The reverse combined elements of the common obverses and reverses; with the date, denomination, coat of arms and country name crossed with horizontal lines. Five-thousand proof coins were issued.

On 12 September 2011, a second commemorative was released as part of a series on Christian art in the feudal era. The obverse featured Mircea the Elder and was struck off-centre like mediaeval hammered coins. It was inscribed MIRCEA CEL BATRAN and also had the years of his rule, 1386-1418. The reverse featured the Cozia Monastery within the '0' of '50', with the country's name in mediaeval writing at the top, the year on the left, and coat of arms at the bottom. Five million were issued, as well as 500 proof coins in the denomination 200 lei, made of pure gold.

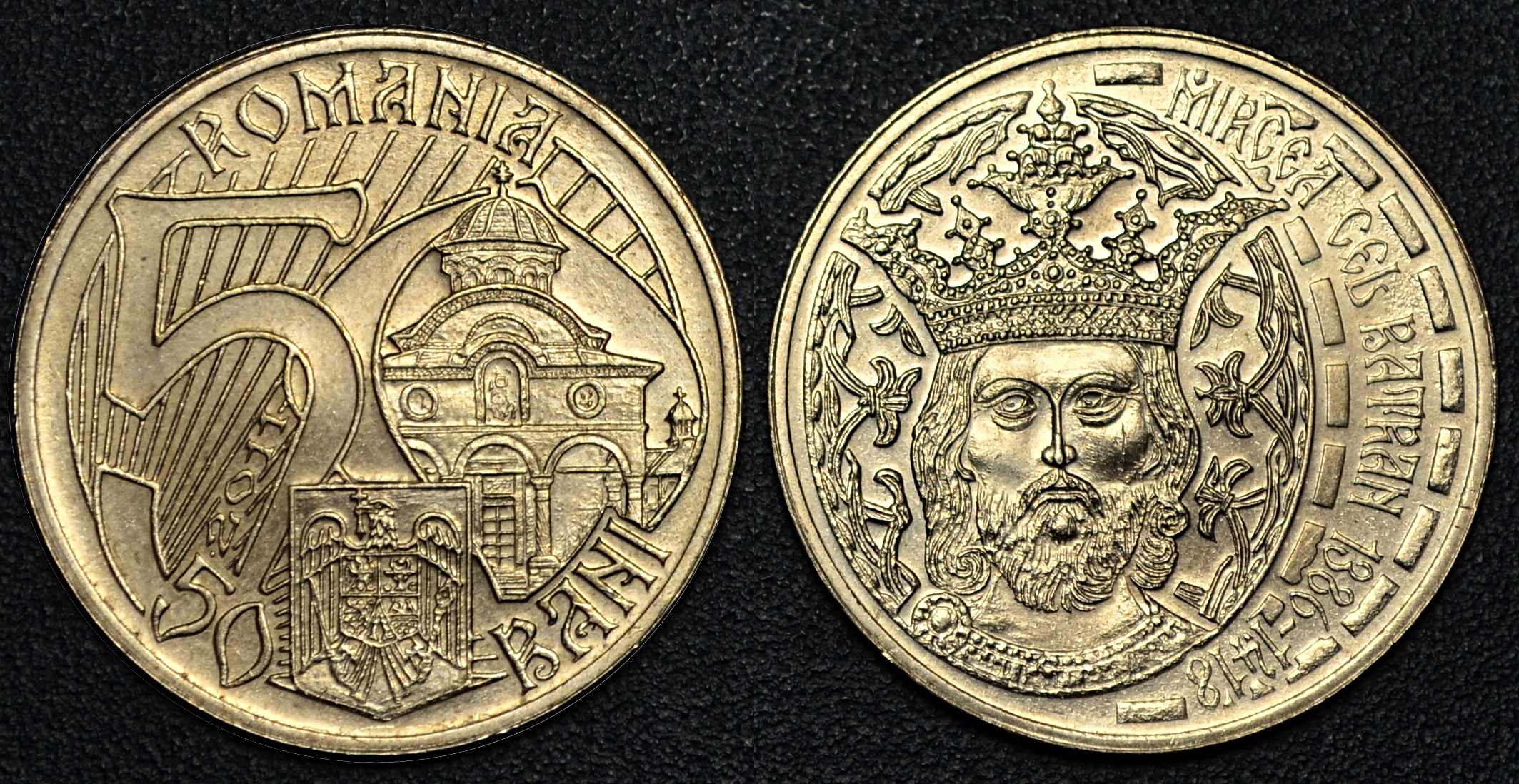

First side of the image: Obverse
Second side of the image: Reverse
Mircea the Elder (2011) issue

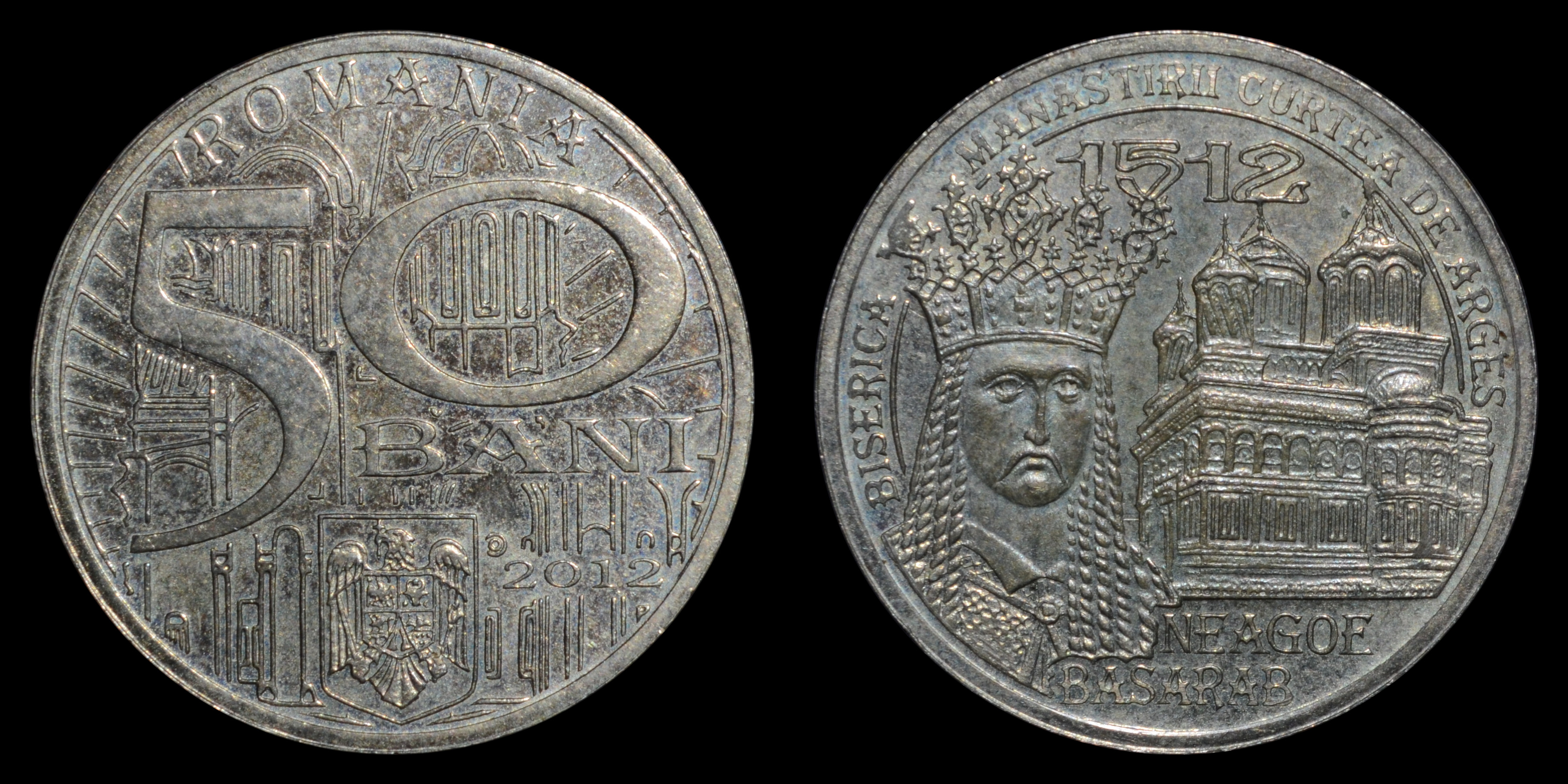

First side of the image: Obverse
Second side of the image: Reverse
Neagoe Basarab (2012) issue
