= A Vlaicu I =

1910 monoplane built by Aurel Vlaicu

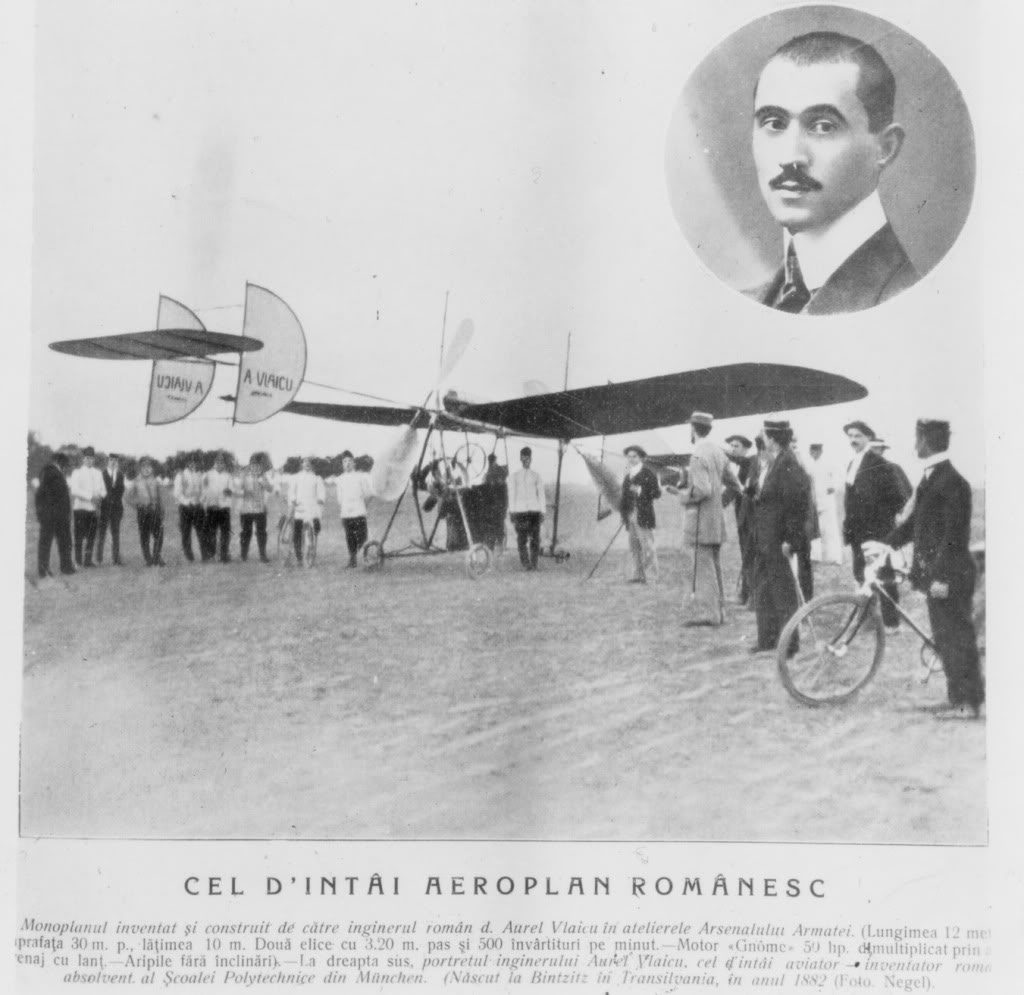

General information
- Type: Monoplane
- Manufacturer: Army Arsenal in Bucharest
- Designer: Aurel Vlaicu
- Number built: 1

History
- First flight: 17 June 1910
- Developed from: A Vlaicu 1909 glider and rubber band models

The A Vlaicu I was the first powered airplane built by Aurel Vlaicu.

== Design and development ==
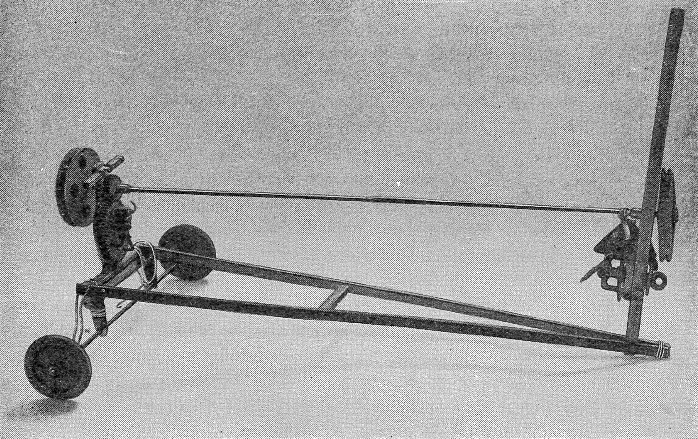
Fragment of one of Vlaicu's rubber band model planes on custody of the National Military Museum.

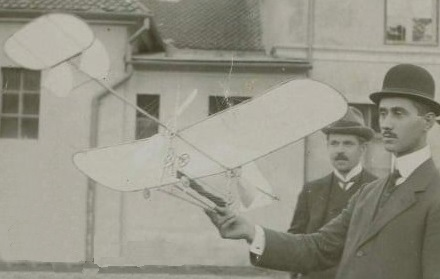
Aurel Vlaicu with a model of his airplane in Sept. 1909

After flying his glider in Binținți, Aurel Vlaicu moved to the Kingdom of Romania. With help from Romanian-Transylvanian expatriates in Bucharest, he obtained financial support to build his first powered airplane, following a number of demonstration flights with rubber-powered models in front of Romanian government officials and journalists.

On November 1, 1909, he began the construction of his first powered airplane, the A. Vlaicu Nr. I at the Army Arsenal in Bucharest. The Romanian Ministry of War provided an initial grant of 2000 lei, and Minister of Public Education was paying Vlaicu a 300 lei monthly stipend.

The A. Vlaicu Nr. I flew for the first time on June 17, 1910, over Cotroceni airfield.

For his design, Aurel Vlaicu was granted in 1911 patents: AT60800, CH54597, DK15328, FR422554 and GB191026658.

== Military Commission Report ==
Below are the minutes after aerial demonstrations held by Aurel Vlaicu in August 1910 before a military commission :

Underwriters assisting in day August 13, 1910, from flights performed by the airplane or engineer Vlaicu I agree to the following conclusions to be made to the Ministry of War, which subsidizes this engineer .

1. Flights performed were two in number, of the same kind and go, the former being slower than the second. Both were executed at Cotroceni 6 pm and 6 and ¼, a calm atmosphere.
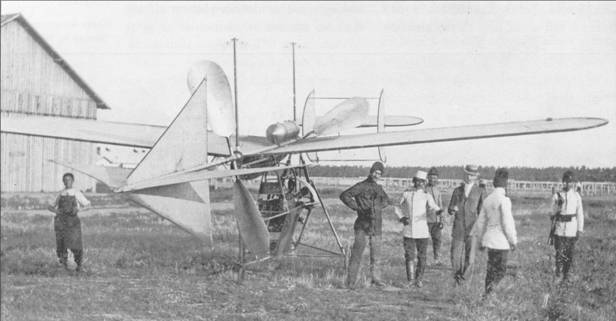
  A. Vlaicu Nr. I viewed from behind.
  Turning first he made smoothly traversing a distance of about 40 m, after which the unit was raised with all wheels at once, taking up diagonally from the corner of North hangar polygon infantry, until it reached a height of 40 m. Aviator long welcomed chapel in his right hand and went on the height at line forts, bypassing then north to the East where he bypassed followed right into the hangar where it landed among the public traversing about 20 m in all this time about 10 minutes, about 14 kilometers to go, the machine running 27 horsepower and so propellers spinning slowly because they could see the blades. There was not the slightest hesitation, pitching, or rocking.
  Upon descent, the pilot was applauded and embraced by acquaintances, friends, and protectors. He said he is very pleased with the device, but the engine lubricant spread, and dirty clothes pilot, which will be remedied by the adoption of a curtain.
  2nd run on the same road traveled, but rising by 14–15 m to go on the ground and climb up to about 60 m landing was made calm and safe, all in the midst of assistance. Aviator always greet passes to show that he can lead the unit with one hand. Made during the 15 km in 9 minutes (about 100 km. Per hour), with 37 hp (machine can produce 50 horsepower).
2. It is our opinion that these flights are probably the best way to engineer Vlaicu is true that we have little to compete with the first appliance or apparatus known. This opinion is based on the consideration that an appear below the experienced author would not have run so successful flights as pilot practice is very limited and did not fly away itself until today, the timidity natural accident caused by his clumsiness due to steering. Merit aviator but Vlaicu is that without pilot school and without having to be flown for the first time managed to run flights to the most famous aviators, without having their calm temperament. This proves that the device or helped much success through the qualities of stability and simplicity of maneuvering . But believe that this airplane can be a valuable reconnaissance unit, meaning very good military and we believe that the War Department to continue to patronize needful final realization, and to enter into negotiations with the author for to ensure the right building . The above findings are based solely on the good success of these flights, but as before they are convinced of the good qualities of the airplane, which I argued against criticism that it has been exaggerated.
3. In summary the committee suggests the following:
  1. Continue to proving this model, the assistance of an experienced military commission composed of officers;
  2. Make a deal with the pilot in order to ensure ownership of this device Ministry;
  3. to construct a final model with actual engine for which to predict and agree to the amount of 18,000 lei (new engine);
  4. A fund provided a budget of at least 100,000 lei for the construction of at least part of it required military airplanes;
  5. To be established at Arsenal a special section for building airplanes, under the leadership of engineer Vlaicu, this section being with automotive repair, everywhere under Mr. Vlaicu, for which we suggest a monthly salary of at least 600 lei.

Signatures:

Captain (indecipherable)
Major (probably) Mihailov
Colonel D. Iliescu
General Georgescu

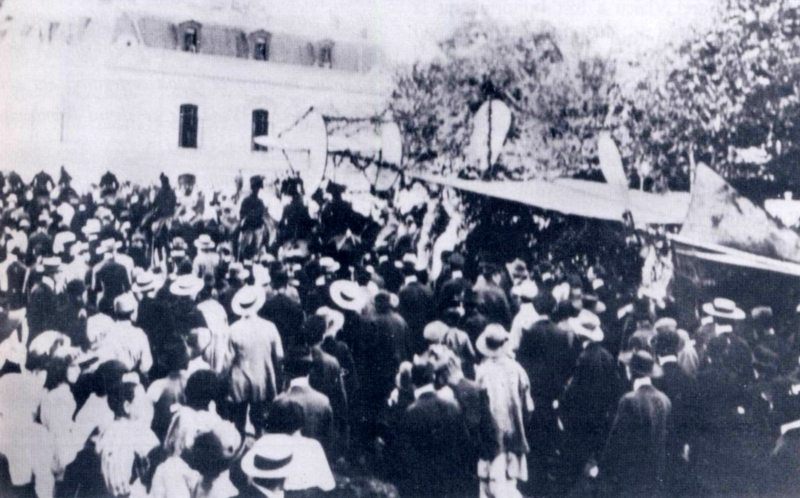
Vlaicu's funerals on September 17, 1913 with A Vlaicu I drawn by horses.

== Operational history ==
On September 28, 1910, as a part of the Fall military exercises, Vlaicu flew his airplane from Slatina to Piatra Olt carrying a message, an early instance of an airplane being used for military purposes.

On October 17, 1910, he performed a demonstration flight on Băneasa Hippodrome.

Last public display was on September 17, 1913, part of Aurel Vlaicu's funeral procession.

== Operators ==
Romania
Romanian Air Corps

== Galley ==
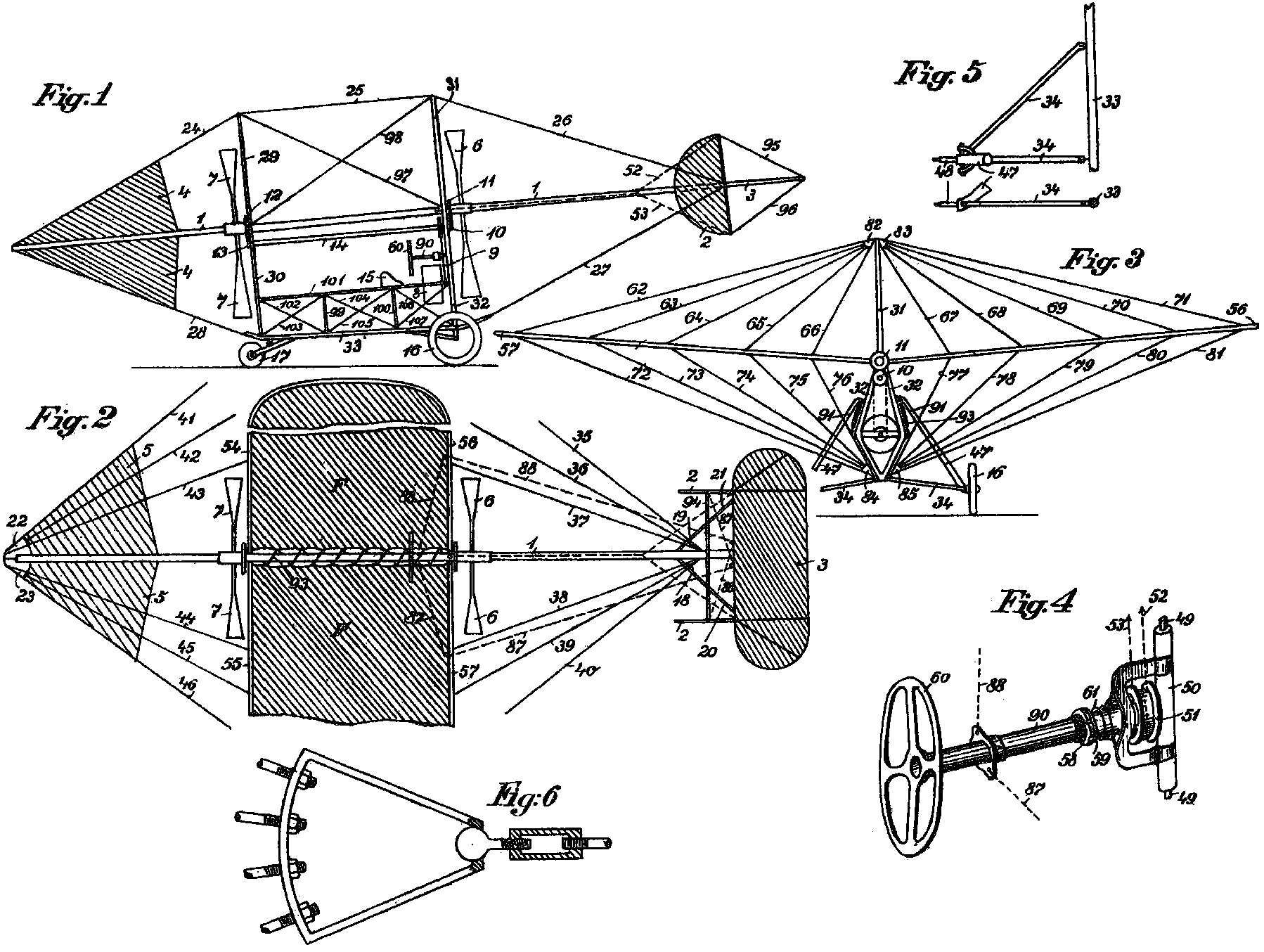
Vlaicu patent drawings

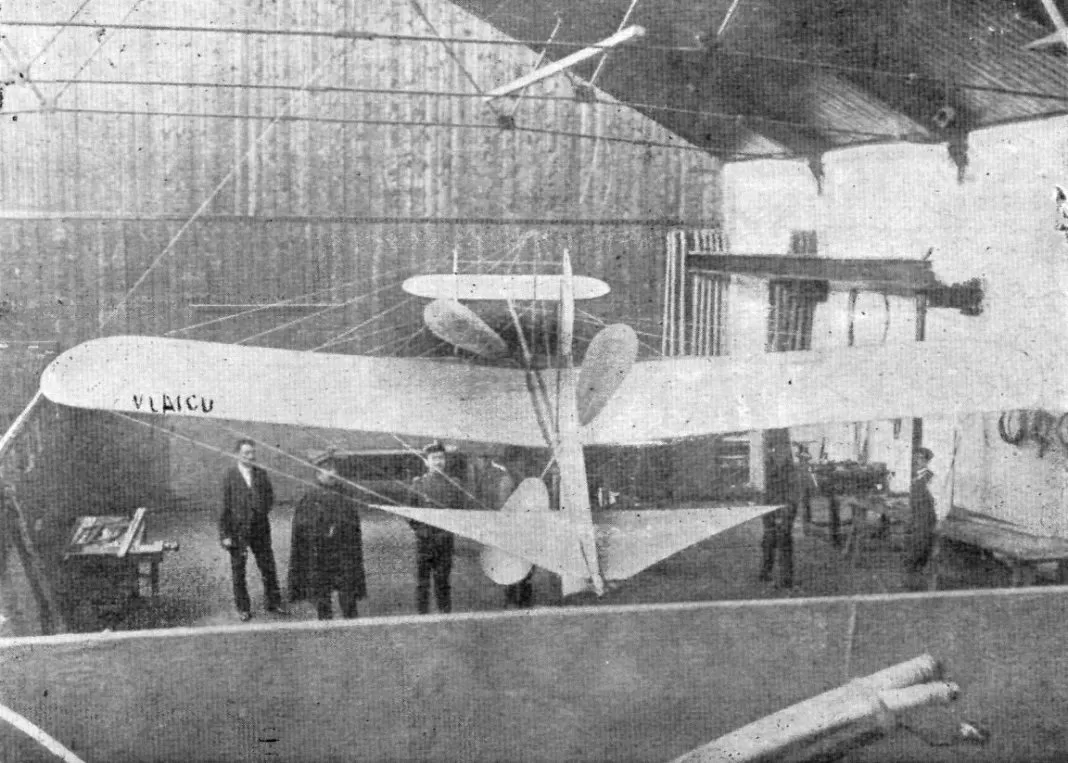
A Vlaicu I under construction early in 1910.

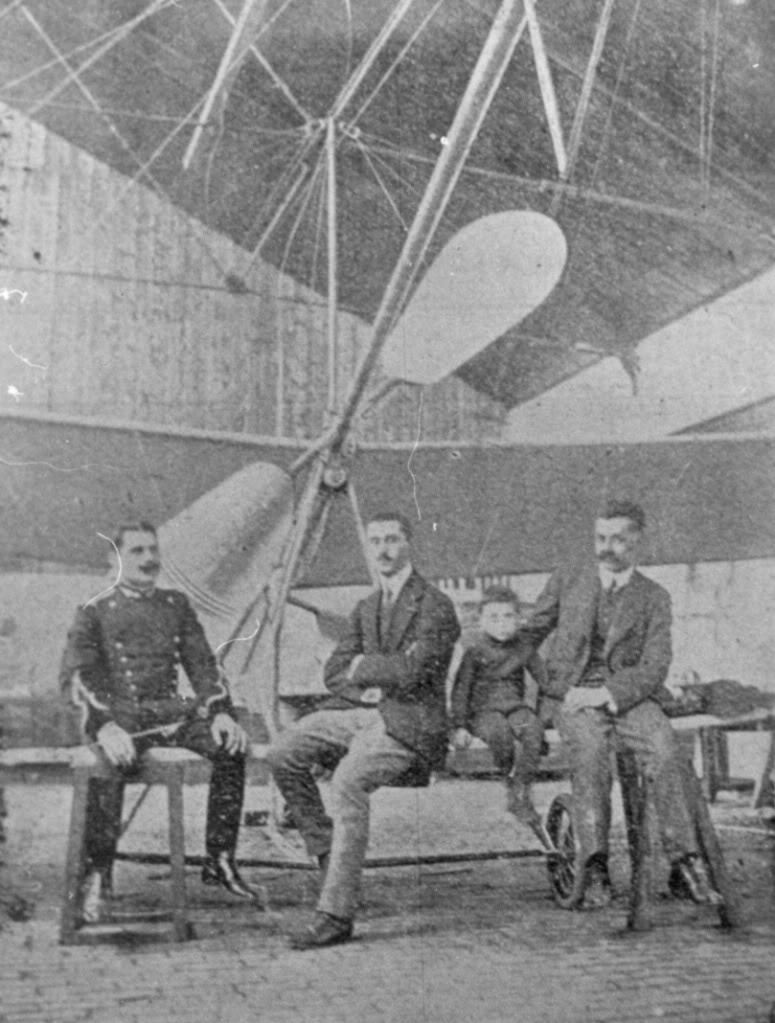

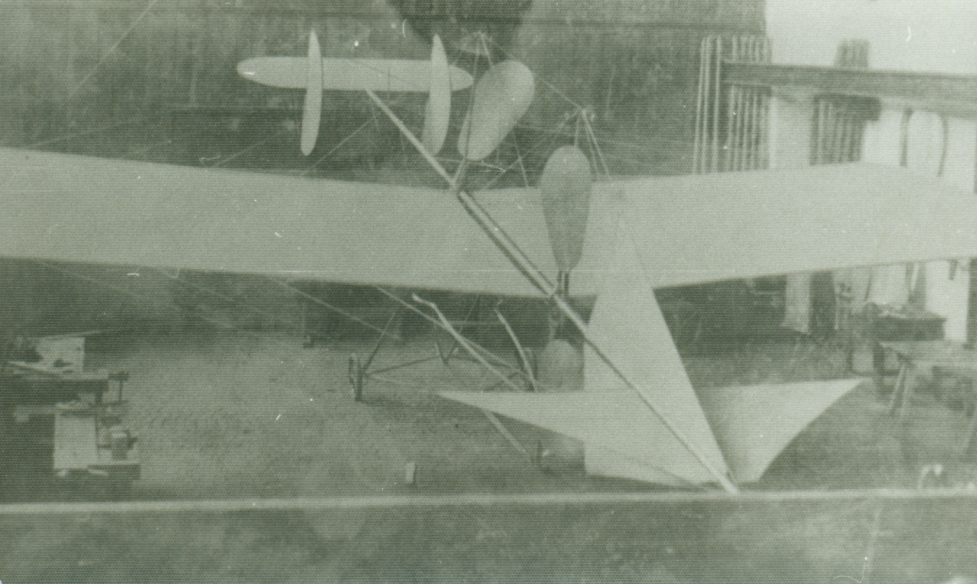

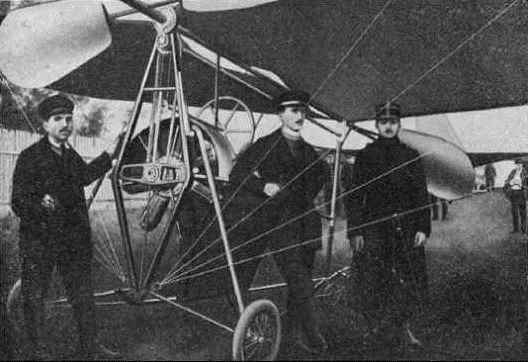
A. Vlaicu Nr. I airplane at October 1910 military exercises

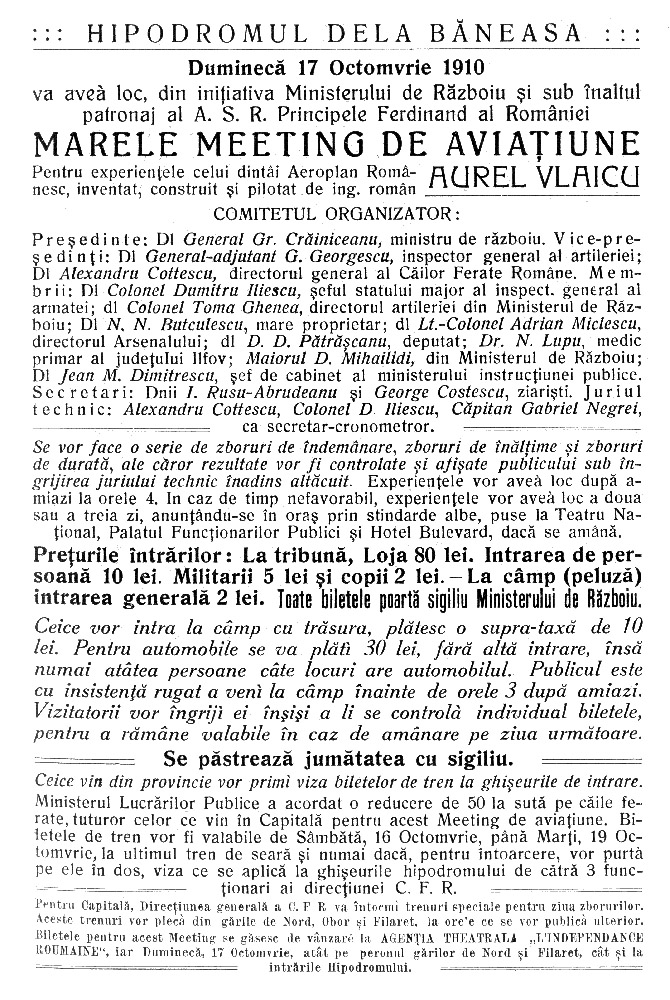
Poster for Vlaicu's demonstrative flights on October 17, 1910

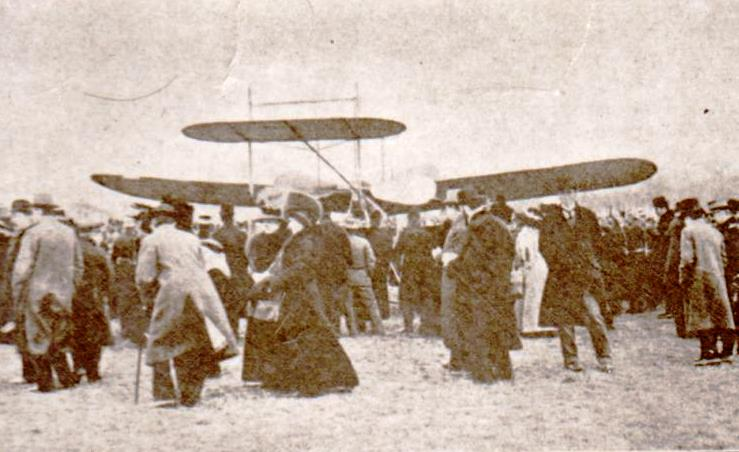

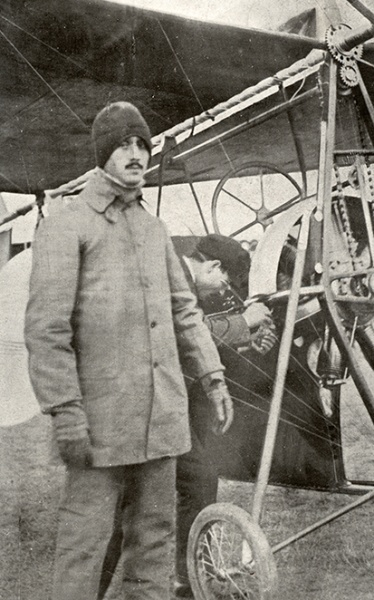

== Specifications (Military) ==
Data from

General characteristics

- Crew: 1
- Length: 12 m (39 ft 4 in)
- Wingspan: 10 m (32 ft 10 in)
- Height: 4.2 m (13 ft 9 in)
- Wing area: 25 m^{2} (270 sq ft)
- Gross weight: 300 kg (661 lb)
- Powerplant: 1 × Gnome Omega air-cooled rotary piston engine, 37 kW (50 hp)
- Propellers: (2 coaxial, counter-rotating) 2-bladed, 3 m (9 ft 10 in) diameter

Performance

- Maximum speed: 110 km/h (68 mph, 59 kn)
- Service ceiling: 1,000 m (3,300 ft)

== See also ==
- Aurel Vlaicu
- A Vlaicu II
- A Vlaicu III
- List of aircraft (pre-1914)
