= Monument to the Heroes of the Air =

Aviation monument in Bucharest, Romania

- Romania
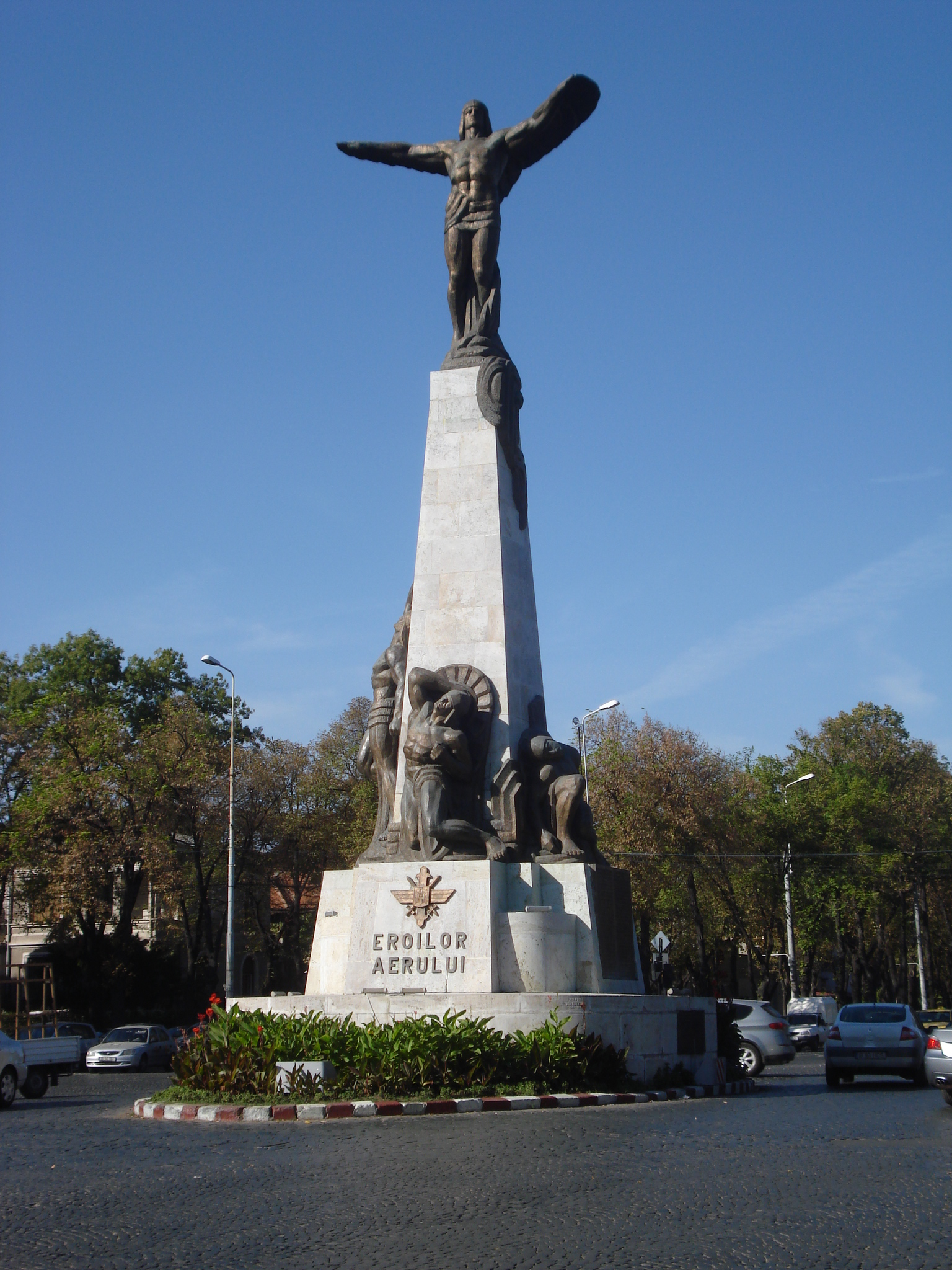
- For To the Airmen Heroes of the World War I
- Unveiled: 21 July 1935
- Location: 44.45976°N 26.08609°E; Aviators' Square, Bucharest, Romania
- Designed by: Iosif Fekete, Lidia Kotzebuie
- EROILOR AERULUI

The Monument to the Heroes of the Air (Romanian: Monumentul Eroilor Aerului), located in the Aviators' Square, on Aviators' Boulevard, Bucharest, Romania, was built between 1930 and 1935 by sculptors Lidia Kotzebue (1885–1944), and by Iosif Fekete. The structure, 20 m (65.6 ft) high, is made up of bronze sculptures resting on an obelisk-shaped stone pedestal, which in turn stands atop four trapezoidal prisms linked to each other by arcs. Beneath this entire complex is a circular stone base.

Attached to the top of the obelisk, which reaches 15 m, is a 5-meter, 5-ton statue depicting a flying man, his wings outstretched. The folds of a shawl fall from his waist onto the obelisk. Three aviators, each in a different stage of flight attempt, are depicted around the base of the obelisk. On the pedestal are the aviators' insignia, helmet and equipment, as well as engraved plaques with the names of Romanian airmen who had crashed to their deaths by the time the monument was built. These men died pursuing various goals: skill development, performance, adventure and fighting in World War I. The first name is that of Gheorghe Caranda, killed on 20 April 1912 on an airfield during a training flight; the last is that of Sava Rotaru, killed on 29 May 1934 in thick fog in the hills around Cernavodă. After the official dedication, 99 additional names have been posted on the North bottom side of the pedestal.

== History ==
In 1927 a committee was formed for the construction of the Aviators' Monument. This body was made up of Prof. I. Cantacuzino; General Vasile Rudeanu; Victor Atanasiu, a colonel in the Romanian Air Force's medical corps; and the pilots Cornel Olănescu and Mihai Oromolu. The committee initiated a contest for designing the monument, and invited interested artists, painters and sculptors to participate. Twenty designs were submitted and exposed at the Romanian Athenaeum in order to allow the public to choose the winner by secret ballot.

The winning design, that of architect Lidia Kotzebuie, used as a model for the aviator's body that of Joe Louis, who visited Bucharest around that time, while the head was based on an image found in a catalogue of famous aviators.

In July 1927, the committee asked Kotzebuie to execute a model one quarter the size of the planned monument by that October 1; on October 27, it officially approved her project. In 1930, with the help of the Air Ministry, material from the Argeș River was brought to the Malaxa Factory, where the statue was to be produced. There, in May 1930, in the architect's presence, the statue was cast in bronze, after a plaster model.

On July 21, 1935, the monument was inscribed "Eroilor Aerului" ("To the Airmen Heroes"); the original lettering has been preserved. At its unveiling the following day, leading state authorities were present, as well as ministers and representatives of the Air Ministry; speeches were delivered and congratulations offered to the architect and all those who participated in the project. The event closed with a military parade made up of honour guards and aviators, and military honours were awarded to the pilots mentioned on the lists at the base of the monument.

In 1981, a miniature copy accompanied cosmonaut Dumitru Prunariu into outer space. After the fall of the Communist regime in 1989, the ornamental design above the dedication, representing the cross of the Order of Aeronautical Virtue (a cross with its side bar shaped like wings, a pair of crossed swords and the Coat of arms of Romania) was restored. Each Aviators' Day (July 20), wreaths and bouquets of flowers are laid before the monument in honour of those commemorated that day.

== Bibliography ==
- Florian Georgescu, Paul Cernovodeanu, Alexandru Cebuc. Monumente din București. Bucharest: Meridiane, 1966
