= Banknotes of the Romanian leu =

Since 1867 there have been four successive currencies in Romania known as the leu (plural lei). This article details the banknotes denominated in the leu and its subdivision the ban since 1917, with images.

== Banknotes of the first leu (ROL) ==
=== 1877 issue ===
1877 Bilet Hypothecar Series
Image		Value	Dimensions	Main Colour	Description		Date of		
Obverse	Reverse	Value	Dimensions	Main Colour	Obverse	Reverse	printing	issue	withdrawal
		5 L		Blue			1877	12 June 1877	June 1889
		10 L		Blue			1877	12 June 1877	June 1889
		20 L		Blue			1877	12 June 1877	June 1889
		50 L		Blue			1877	12 June 1877	June 1889
		100 L		Blue			1877	12 June 1877	June 1889
		500 L		Blue			1877	12 June 1877	June 1889
These images are to scale at 0.7 pixel per millimetre (18 pixel per inch). For table standards, see the banknote specification table.

=== 1909–1916 issue ===
1909–1916 Series
Image		Value	Dimensions	Main Colour	Description		Date of	
Obverse	Reverse	Value	Dimensions	Main Colour	Obverse	Reverse	printing	issue
		1 L						
		2 L						
		5 L						
		20 L						
		100 L						
		500 L						
		1000 L						
These images are to scale at 0.7 pixel per millimetre (18 pixel per inch). For table standards, see the banknote specification table.

=== German occupation WWI issue ===
1917 German Occupation Series
Image		Value	Dimensions	Main Colour	Description		Date of		
Obverse	Reverse	Value	Dimensions	Main Colour	Obverse	Reverse	printing	issue	withdrawal
		25 b	95 × 60 mm				1917	1917	
		50 b	108 × 70 mm				1917	1917	
		1 L	130 × 80 mm				1917	1917	
		2 L	132 × 80 mm				1917	1917	
		5 L	144 × 90 mm				1917	1917	
		20 L	160 × 98 mm				1917	1917	
		100 L	188 × 115 mm				1917	1917	
		1000 L	213 × 130 mm				1917	1917	
These images are to scale at 0.7 pixel per millimetre (18 pixel per inch). For table standards, see the banknote specification table.

=== 1917 issue ("paper coins") ===
Issued in Iași, during World War I by the Ministry of Finance, as war money. The banknotes represent the ban (pl. bani).

1917 Series
Image		Value	Dimensions	Main Colour	Description		Date of	
Obverse	Reverse	Value	Dimensions	Main Colour	Obverse	Reverse	printing	issue
		10 b	33 × 44 mm	green	King Ferdinand	Coat of arms		1917
		25 b	39 × 51 mm	green, yellow	King Ferdinand	Coat of arms		1917
		50 b	45 × 60 mm	green, orange	King Ferdinand	Coat of arms		1917

=== 1920 issue ===
1920 Series
Image		Value	Dimensions	Main Colour	Description		Date of	
Obverse	Reverse	Value	Dimensions	Main Colour	Obverse	Reverse	printing	issue
		1 L	78 × 55	blue	industrial landscape, value, maid	Coat of arms, Capitoline Wolf, Decebal, Trajan	1920	17 July 1920
		2 L	104 × 68	blue	maid, value, vulture	Coat of arms, two Romanian soldiers	1920	17 July 1920
		5 L	133 × 81	blue, red, violet	Coat of arms, value, peasant lady spinning wool	maid and child in a loom, value	1920	25 March 1920
These images are to scale at 0.7 pixel per millimetre (18 pixel per inch). For table standards, see the banknote specification table.

=== 1934–1947 issue ===
The 5,000, 10,000, 100,000 (1946), 1,000,000, and 5,000,000 lei banknotes from the 1943–1947 series had the left edge wavy.

1922–1947 Series
Image		Value	Dimensions	Main Colour	Description			Date of printing and issue
Obverse	Reverse	Value	Dimensions	Main Colour	Obverse	Reverse	Watermark	Date of printing and issue
		500 L	157 × 86	brown	Romanian peasant women, the small coat of arms, value	Peleș Castle	continuous rows BNR	1934–1942
		1,000 L	183 × 104	brown, green	Romanian peasant women, value	Romanian peasant women	King Carol II	1936–1940
		1,000 L	183 × 104	green, purple	Romanian peasant women, value	Romanian peasant women	Nerva Traian	1941–1945
		2,000 L	201 × 113	brown	Romanian peasant women, value	Romanian peasant women, the middle coat of arms, industrial landscape, Peleș Castle (in the background)	Nerva Traian	1941
		2,000 L	201 × 113	brown	Romanian peasant women, value	Romanian peasant women, the middle coat of arms, industrial landscape, Peleș Castle (in the background)	continuous rows BNR	1943–1945
		5,000 L	166 × 91	blue	Decebal, Nerva Traian, the middle coat of arms,	industrial, urban and rural landscape	Nerva Traian	1943
		5,000 L	166 × 91	blue	Decebal, Nerva Traian, the middle coat of arms,	industrial, urban and rural landscape	continuous rows BNR	1945
		10,000 L	194 × 107	brown, pink	Romanian peasant women, the middle coat of arms, value	Romanian peasant women, the middle coat of arms	continuous rows BNR	1945–1946
		100,000 L	187 × 90	blue, green	Romanian peasant women, value		continuous rows BNR	1946
		100,000 L	182 × 88	pink, orange	Decebal, Nerva Traian, value	Romanian peasants, the middle coat of arms, value	continuous rows BNR	1947
		1,000,000 L	190 × 90	green, blue	Decebal, Nerva Traian, value	Romanian peasants, the middle coat of arms, value	continuous rows BNR	1947
		5,000,000 L	205x105	yellow, brown	Capitoline Wolf, value	Romanian peasants, value		1947
These images are to scale at 0.7 pixel per millimetre (18 pixel per inch). For table standards, see the banknote specification table.

=== Red Army 1944 issue ===
1944 Red Army Occupation Series
Image		Value	Dimensions	Main Colour	Description		Date of		
Obverse	Reverse	Value	Dimensions	Main Colour	Obverse	Reverse	printing	issue	withdrawal
		5 L	115 x 60 mm	Blue			1944		1 October 1944
		10 L	160 x 80 mm	Brown			1944		1 October 1944
		20 L	170 x 85 mm	Blue			1944		1 October 1944
		100 L	186 x 100 mm	Brown-olive			1944		1 October 1944
		500 L	195 x 104 mm	Brown			1944		1 October 1944
		1000 L	200 x 105 mm	Red			1944		1 October 1944
		5000 L	205 x 102 mm	Blue			1944		1 October 1944
These images are to scale at 0.7 pixel per millimetre (18 pixel per inch). For table standards, see the banknote specification table.

== Banknotes of the second leu (ROS) ==
=== Kingdom of Romania ===
1947 Series
Image		Value	Dimensions	Main Colour	Description		Date of		
Obverse	Reverse	Value	Dimensions	Main Colour	Obverse	Reverse	issue	withdrawal	lapse
		20 L			Trajan and Decebal		15 August 1947	30 January 1952	1 February 1952
		100 L		Brown	three workers holding a hammer, a bunch of wheat and a torch	"Romania"	15 August 1947	30 January 1952	1 February 1952
		500 L		Brown	Romanian peasant woman		15 August 1947	30 January 1952	1 February 1952
		1000 L			Tudor Vladimirescu	Lesser coat of arms of the Kingdom of Romania, replaced since 1948 by the coat of arms of the People's Republic of Romania	15 August 1947	30 January 1952	1 February 1952
These images are to scale at 0.7 pixel per millimetre (18 pixel per inch). For table standards, see the banknote specification table.

=== People's Republic of Romania ===
1948 Series
Image		Value	Dimensions	Main Colour	Description		Date of		
Obverse	Reverse	Value	Dimensions	Main Colour	Obverse	Reverse	issue	withdrawal	lapse
		20 L	138 × 63 mm	Brown, green	maiden	Coat of arms	15 October 1948	30 January 1952	1 February 1952
		500 L	157 × 73 mm	Red	Horea, Cloșca and Crișan	Factory	15 October 1948	30 January 1952	1 February 1952
		1000 L	172 × 80 mm	Blue	Nicolae Bălcescu	River natural scene	15 October 1948	30 January 1952	1 February 1952
These images are to scale at 0.7 pixel per millimetre (18 pixel per inch). For table standards, see the banknote specification table.							15 October 1948	30 January 1952	1 February 1952

== Banknotes of the third leu (ROL) ==
=== 1952 issue ===
1952 Series
Image		Value	Dimensions	Main Colour	Description		Date of		
Obverse	Reverse	Value	Dimensions	Main Colour	Obverse	Reverse	printing	issue	withdrawal
		1 L	118 × 57 mm	Brown, yellow	Value	Coat of arms	January 1952	28 January 1952	16 April 1970
		3 L	122 × 61 mm	Dark brown, green	Value	Coat of arms	January 1952	28 January 1952	16 April 1970
		5 L	122 × 65 mm	Dark blue, yellow	Maid	Dam construction scene	January 1952	28 January 1952	16 April 1970
		10 L	135 × 73 mm	Red, green	Furnace worker	Quarry scene	January 1952	28 January 1952	16 April 1970
		25 L	148 × 80 mm	Dark brown, violet	Tudor Vladimirescu	Harvesting scene	January 1952	28 January 1952	16 April 1970
		100 L	168 × 90 mm	Blue	Nicolae Bălcescu	Casa Scânteii	January 1952	28 January 1952	16 April 1970
These images are to scale at 0.7 pixel per millimetre (18 pixel per inch). For table standards, see the banknote specification table.

=== 1966 issue ===
1966 Series
Image		Value	Dimensions	Main colour	Description		Date of		
Obverse	Reverse	Value	Dimensions	Main colour	Obverse	Reverse	printing	issue	withdrawal
		1 L	103 × 52 mm	Brown, yellow	Coat of arms	Value	1966	1 November 1966	15 December 1996 (no longer in circulation since 1970–1972)
		3 L	114 × 57 mm	Dark blue	Coat of arms	Value	1966	1 November 1966	15 December 1996 (no longer in circulation since 1970–1972)
		5 L	124 × 62 mm	Light brown	Coat of arms	Port	1966	1 November 1966	15 December 1996 (no longer in circulation since 1984–1986)
		10 L	131 × 65 mm	Violet	Coat of arms	Harvesting scene	1966	1 November 1966	15 December 1996 (no longer in circulation since 1990–1994)
		25 L	140 × 70 mm	Dark green	Tudor Vladimirescu	Factory (Coke ovens of the Hunedoara Steelworks)	1966	1 November 1966	15 December 1996 (no longer in circulation since 1990–1994)
		50 L	145 × 72 mm	Green	Alexandru Ioan Cuza	Palace of Culture, Iași	1966	1 November 1966	15 December 1996 (no longer in circulation since 1990–1994)
		100 L	153 × 75 mm	Blue	Nicolae Bălcescu	Romanian Athenaeum	1966	1 November 1966	15 December 1996 (no longer in circulation since 1990–1994)
These images are to scale at 0.7 pixel per millimetre (18 pixel per inch). For table standards, see the banknote specification table.

In 1966, as the Socialist Republic of Romania was established, a new remake of the banknote series was made. These were printed between 1966 and 1990, though similar to the Soviet Ruble's 1961 series, they were only dated to 1966. Gold standard was abandoned after drastic measures were required to prevent inflation. This caused the Leu to lose exchange parity with other foreign currencies from 1970 to 1989. The exchange rate was set by the leadership through legislative measures. The exchange rate was used by the regime to calculate the value of trade to other states. These banknotes were prohibited from selling to private individuals. Possession or sale of currency was a criminal offense punishable by up to 10 years in prison. Foreign trade was considered part of a different economic circuit than the domestic one and was given greater importance. In 1987, hyperinflation began to appear and the National Bank wanted to issue higher denomination banknotes but Ceausescu refused. After the Romanian Revolution, these banknotes were kept in circulation even against the fact that all of them were coined in the first years. During the hyperinflation, these notes began to lose total value and after 1997, all socialist banknotes were completely withdrawn.

=== 1991–1992 issue ===
1991 Series
Image		Value	Dimensions	Main Colour	Description		Date of	
Obverse	Reverse	Value	Dimensions	Main Colour	Obverse	Reverse	printing	withdrawal
		500 L	157 × 75 mm	Brown	Constantin Brâncuși	Constantin Brâncuși	January 1991	16 December 1999
		500 L	157 × 75 mm	Brown	Constantin Brâncuși	Constantin Brâncuși	April 1991	16 December 1999
		1,000 L	167 × 75 mm	Red, green	Mihai Eminescu	Putna Monastery	September 1991	1 April 1999
		5,000 L	172 × 77 mm	Violet, blue	Avram Iancu	Densuș Church, Dacian Draco, Gate of Alba Iulia Citadel	March 1992	1 April 1999
These images are to scale at 0.7 pixel per millimetre (18 pixel per inch). For table standards, see the banknote specification table.

These banknotes were released due to the fact that Romania did not change its socialist coat of arms until the Constitution of 1991 was introduced in September 1992. Following this, these banknotes continued to circulate with the later 1992-93 versions of these banknotes in parallel and were treated the same. Surprisingly, they lost more value than the socialist banknotes during their existence.

1992 Series
Image		Value	Dimensions	Main Colour	Description		Date of	
Obverse	Reverse	Value	Dimensions	Main Colour	Obverse	Reverse	printing	withdrawal
		200 L	155 × 76 mm	Light brown, blue	Grigore Antipa	Danube Delta	December 1992	31 March 1999
		500 L	160 × 76 mm	Green, red	Constantin Brâncuși	Sculptures by Brâncuși	December 1992	16 December 1999
		1,000 L	167 × 75 mm	Red, green	Mihai Eminescu	Putna Monastery	May 1993	1 April 1999
		5,000 L	172 × 77 mm	Violet, blue	Avram Iancu	Densuș Church, Dacian Draco, Gate of Alba Iulia Citadel	May 1993	1 April 1999
		10,000 L	180 × 77 mm	Light red, violet	Nicolae Iorga	Șuțu Palace	February 1994	16 December 2000
These images are to scale at 0.7 pixel per millimetre (18 pixel per inch). For table standards, see the banknote specification table.

After the adoption of the new coat of arms with the Constitution of 1991, banknotes with the new coat of arms began to be printed. As a result of hyperinflation, not longer after the series was finished in May 1993, the new 10,000 Lei was introduced in 1994 (the first and only banknote with a segment thread that changes color (from purple to lime green)) as a result of the ongoing hyperinflation.

=== 1996–2000 issue ===
1996 Series - paper
Image		Value	Dimensions	Main Colour	Description		Date of			
Obverse	Reverse	Value	Dimensions	Main Colour	Obverse	Reverse	printing	issue	withdrawal	lapse
		1,000 L	140 × 61 mm	Blue	Mihai Eminescu	Ruins of Histria, Linden tree flowers	1998	1 June 1998	17 December 2001	1 February 2002
		5,000 L	145 × 64 mm	Orange	Lucian Blaga	Crucifix	1998	1 June 1998	17 June 2002	1 October 2002
		10,000 L	150 × 67 mm	Green	Nicolae Iorga, Milkweed gentian	Cathedral of Curtea de Argeș	1999	15 July 1999	16 December 2002	1 July 2003
		50,000 L	155 × 70 mm	Violet	George Enescu, Carnation, irregular shape with safety feature	The Sphinx of Bucegi Mountains, musical chord from "Oedip King"	1996	20 November 1996	16 December 2002	1 July 2003
		50,000 L	155 × 70 mm	Violet	George Enescu, Carnation, shape of a violin	The Sphinx of Bucegi Mountains, musical chord from "Oedip King"	2000	6 March 2000	1 June 2004	1 January 2005
		100,000 L	160 × 73 mm	Red	Nicolae Grigorescu, Marshmallow	traditional house from Oltenia, scene from the "Rodica" painting	1998	1 June 1998	1 June 2004	1 January 2005
These images are to scale at 0.7 pixel per millimetre (18 pixel per inch). For table standards, see the banknote specification table.

New, upgraded banknotes were introduced in which two new denominations were introduced: 50,000 and 100,000 Lei. The 50,000 Lei had two variants with minimal graphical changes and the new 50,000 from 2000 had a tilting security feature at the violin, just like the 100,000 with the leaves. The 10,000 Lei received a colour changing strip, the first to be introduced in Romania.

=== 1999–2003 issue ===
1999 Series - polymer
Image		Value	Dimensions	Main Colour	Description		Date of			
Obverse	Reverse	Value	Dimensions	Main Colour	Obverse	Reverse	printing	issue	withdrawal	lapse
		2,000 L	143 × 63 mm	Blue, yellow, red	Solar eclipse of August 11, 1999	Map of Romania	1999	2 August 1999	1 December 2004	1 April 2005
		10,000 L	150 × 67 mm	Green	Nicolae Iorga, Milkweed gentian	Cathedral of Curtea de Argeș	2000	18 September 2000	1 January 2007	Indefinite
		50,000 L	155 × 70 mm	Violet	George Enescu, Carnation	Romanian Athenaeum, musical chord from "Oedip King"	2001	14 December 2001	1 January 2007	Indefinite
		100,000 L	160 × 73 mm	Orange, light red	Nicolae Grigorescu, Marshmallow	traditional house from Oltenia, scene from the "Rodica" painting	2001	12 November 2001	1 January 2007	Indefinite
		500,000 L	165 × 76 mm	Yellow	Aurel Vlaicu, Edelweiss	A Vlaicu II airplane design	2000	23 October 2000	1 January 2007	Indefinite
		1,000,000 L	168 × 78 mm	Blue	Ion Luca Caragiale, Sweet violet	National Theatre of Bucharest (old building)	2003	5 December 2003	1 January 2007	Indefinite
These images are to scale at 0.7 pixel per millimetre (18 pixel per inch). For table standards, see the banknote specification table.

A 500 lei coin and the 2,000 lei note shown above were made in order to celebrate the 1999 total solar eclipse. Whereas the 500 lei coin is currently very rare, becoming a prized collector's item, the 2,000 lei note was quite popular, being taken out of circulation in 2004 (a long time after the 1,000 and 5,000 lei bills were replaced by coins). The 2,000 Lei note became the first ever polymer note in Romania (and also in Europe) and was printed by Note Printing Australia in Melbourne.

== Banknotes of the fourth leu (RON) ==
The leu notes issued on 1 July 2005 are of equal size to euro banknotes, so that machines will need less refitting once Romania joins the euro zone. This decision was taken after a lot of debate, and with some opposition, the initial decision being to make them even smaller, similar to the 1966 series. The old leu notes were rather long and fairly uncomfortable to carry.

The design of the notes follows some common guidelines: the obverse shows a flower native to Romania and the portrait of a Romanian cultural personality; the reverse shows a building or a well-known monument. All banknotes are printed on plastic polymer, each in its own colour theme (light green for 1 leu, light purple for 5 lei, light pink and light orange for 10 lei, pale green for 20 lei, yellow for 50 lei, blue for 100 lei, dark orange for 200 lei, and light gray for 500 lei). On 14 November 2008 the National Bank of Romania announced the issue of a redesigned 10 lei banknote. The new design employs offset printing in favor of the intaglio printing used in the 2005 series. Also the transparent window will undergo a shape redesign.

Each banknote also features a small transparent window, in the shape of a distinctive item characterising the activity of the pictured personality, a heraldic symbol for Nicolae Iorga, a music key for George Enescu, painting implements for Nicolae Grigorescu, the Military Virtue Medal for Ecaterina Teodoroiu, an eagle's head for flying pioneer Aurel Vlaicu, theater masks for Ion Luca Caragiale, a pen point for Lucian Blaga and an hourglass symbolising poetry and time for Mihai Eminescu. Each banknote has a different texture, to be easily recognised in the pocket or by those with visual impairments.

Note that the 20, and 500 lei banknotes see limited usage since they are not dispensed by automated teller machines.

On 21 December 2017, the National Bank of Romania announced that beginning with 1 January 2018, all the banknotes and coins will feature the new version of the coat of arms. All other features (portraits, security etc.) remain unchanged. The banknotes will feature the date of issue 1 January 2018, and will be released as demanded. The 1 July 2005, 1 December 2006, and 1 December 2008 issues will continue to be legal tender and circulate in parallel with the revised banknotes.

On 31 July 2019, the National Bank of Romania announced that it planned to issue the 20 lei banknote, which will feature Ecaterina Teodoroiu, in 2020. In November 2021 the National Bank of Romania announced that the 20 lei banknote bearing Ecaterina Teodoroiu's portrait would be issued on 1 December 2021.

2005, 2006, 2008, 2018, and 2021 Series
Image		Value	Size		Printing Technique	Main Colour	Description			Date of	
Obverse	Reverse	Value	Dimensions	Same size as	Printing Technique	Main Colour	Obverse		Reverse	Printing	Issue
		1 L	120 × 62 mm	€5	Offset	Green	Coat of arms of Romania (1992–2016)	Nicolae Iorga, Milkweed gentian	Cathedral of Curtea de Argeș	2005–2017	1 July 2005
		1 L	120 × 62 mm	€5	Offset	Green	Coat of arms of Romania (2016–present)	Nicolae Iorga, Milkweed gentian	Cathedral of Curtea de Argeș	2019–present	1 January 2018
		5 L	127 × 67 mm	€10	Offset	Violet	Coat of arms of Romania (1992–2016)	George Enescu, Carnation	Romanian Athenaeum	2005–2017	1 July 2005
		5 L	127 × 67 mm	€10	Offset	Violet	Coat of arms of Romania (2016–present)	George Enescu, Carnation	Romanian Athenaeum	2018–present	1 January 2018
		10 L	133 × 72 mm or 135 × 77mm (for 2005 issue)	€20	Intaglio	Pink and light red	Coat of arms of Romania (1992–2016)	Nicolae Grigorescu, Althaea	Traditional house from Oltenia, Nicolae Grigorescu painting Rodica	2005–2007	1 July 2005
		10 L	133 × 72 mm or 135 × 77mm (for 2005 issue)	€20	Offset	Pink and light red	Coat of arms of Romania (1992–2016)	Nicolae Grigorescu, Althaea	Traditional house from Oltenia, Nicolae Grigorescu painting Rodica	2008–2013	1 December 2008
		10 L	133 × 72 mm or 135 × 77mm (for 2005 issue)	€20	Offset	Pink and light red	Coat of arms of Romania (2016–present)	Nicolae Grigorescu, Althaea	Traditional house from Oltenia, Nicolae Grigorescu painting Rodica	2018–present	1 January 2018
		20 L	136 × 77 mm	N/A	Intaglio	Olive green	Coat of arms of Romania (2016–present)	Ecaterina Teodoroiu, Crocus flavus	Mausoleum of Mărășești, Victoria as depicted on the Romanian Victory Medal	2021–present	1 December 2021
		50 L	140 × 77 mm	€50	Intaglio	Yellow	Coat of arms of Romania (1992–2016)	Aurel Vlaicu, Edelweiss	Vlaicu II airplane design, eagle head	2005–2017	1 July 2005
		50 L	140 × 77 mm	€50	Intaglio	Yellow	Coat of arms of Romania (2016–present)	Aurel Vlaicu, Edelweiss	Vlaicu II airplane design, eagle head	2018–present	1 January 2018
		100 L	147 × 82 mm	€100 (1st series)	Intaglio	Blue	Coat of arms of Romania (1992–2016)	Ion Luca Caragiale, Sweet violet	National Theatre of Bucharest (old building), Statue of Ion Luca Caragiale, by Constantin Baraschi	2005–2017	1 July 2005
		100 L	147 × 82 mm	€100 (1st series)	Intaglio	Blue	Coat of arms of Romania (2016–present)	Ion Luca Caragiale, Sweet violet	National Theatre of Bucharest (old building), Statue of Ion Luca Caragiale, by Constantin Baraschi	2018–present	1 January 2018
		200 L	150 × 82 mm	N/A	Intaglio	Brown and orange	Coat of arms of Romania (1992–2016)	Lucian Blaga, poppies	A watermill and the Hamangia Thinker	2006–2016	1 December 2006
		200 L	150 × 82 mm	N/A	Intaglio	Brown and orange	Coat of arms of Romania (2016–present)	Lucian Blaga, poppies	A watermill and the Hamangia Thinker	2018–present	1 January 2018
		500 L	153 × 82 mm	€200 (1st series)	Intaglio	Gray, Blue and violet	Coat of arms of Romania (1992–2016)	Mihai Eminescu, Tilia	Central University Library of Iași	2005–2009	1 July 2005
		500 L	153 × 82 mm	€200 (1st series)	Intaglio	Gray, Blue and violet	Coat of arms of Romania (2016–present)	Mihai Eminescu, Tilia	Central University Library of Iași	2022–present	1 January 2018
These images are to scale at 0.7 pixel per millimetre (18 pixel per inch). For table standards, see the banknote specification table.

== Commemorative banknotes ==
Commemorative banknotes of Romania
Image		Value	Size	Printing Technique	Main Colour	Description		Date of		Notes
Obverse	Reverse	Value	Size	Printing Technique	Main Colour	Obverse	Reverse	Printing	Issue	Notes
		2,000 L	143 × 63 mm	Offset	Blue, yellow, red	Solar eclipse of August 11, 1999	Map of Romania	1999	2 August 1999	Also issued a circulating version (1999–2004)
		100 L	147 × 82 mm	Intaglio	Blue	King Ferdinand, and Queen Marie; scene from The National Assembly in Alba Iulia	Mace of King Ferdinand, scene from the 1 December 1918 return to Bucharest of the Royal Family	2018	1 December 2018	Celebrating 100 years from the Great Union
		100 L	147 × 82 mm	Intaglio	Blue	Ion I. C. Brătianu; Plaque of Order of Carol I	Palace of the Assembly of Deputies (today Palace of the Patriarchate); Order of Carol I (reverse)	2019	1 December 2019	Celebrating 101 years from the Great Union
		20 L	168 x 96 mm	Offset	Cobalt blue	Allegorical young-male figures of Industry and Commerce	Trajan, nominal value	2021	1 December 2021	Polymer replica of the 1881 20 lei banknote. Celebrating 140 years from the printing of the first banknotes in Romania
		100 L	147 × 82 mm	Intaglio	Blue	King Carol I, and signature; scene from The Romanian War of Independence; reverse of the original Order of the Star of Romania	Peleș Castle, statue of King Carol I at Peleș, and King Carol I Bridge (Anghel Saligny Bridge)	2024	1 December 2024	Celebrating 185 years from the birth of King Carol I
These images are to scale at 0.7 pixel per millimetre (18 pixel per inch). For table standards, see the banknote specification table.
