= Solar eclipse of July 31, 1981 =

Total eclipse

- Total eclipse
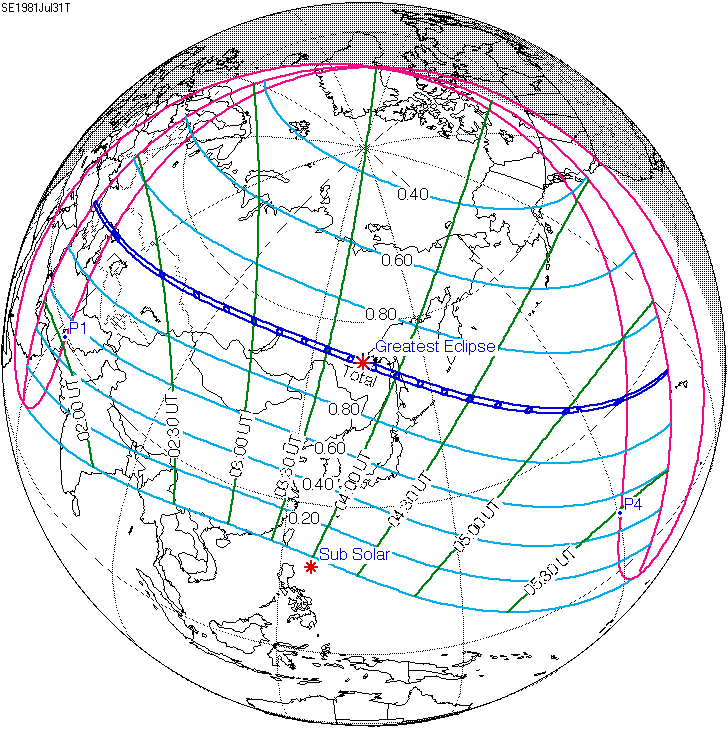
- Map
- Gamma: 0.5792
- Magnitude: 1.0258

Maximum eclipse
- Duration: 122 s (2 min 2 s)
- Coordinates: 53.3°N 134.1°E
- Max. width of band: 108 km (67 mi)

Times (UTC)
- Greatest eclipse: 3:46:37

References
- Saros: 145 (20 of 77)
- Catalog # (SE5000): 9467

A total solar eclipse occurred at the Moon's ascending node of orbit on Friday, July 31, 1981, with a magnitude of 1.0258. A solar eclipse occurs when the Moon passes between Earth and the Sun, thereby totally or partly obscuring the image of the Sun for a viewer on Earth. A total solar eclipse occurs when the Moon's apparent diameter is larger than the Sun's, blocking all direct sunlight, turning day into darkness. Totality occurs in a narrow path across Earth's surface, with the partial solar eclipse visible over a surrounding region thousands of kilometres wide. Occurring about 3.7 days after perigee (on July 27, 1981, at 10:20 UTC), the Moon's apparent diameter was larger.

The moon's apparent diameter was 7 arcseconds larger than the February 4, 1981 annular solar eclipse.

The continental path of totality fell entirely within the Soviet Union, belonging to Georgia, Kazakhstan and Russia today. The southern part of Mount Elbrus, the highest mountain in Europe, also lay in the path of totality. A partial eclipse was visible for parts of Northern Europe, Asia, Alaska, western Canada, and Greenland. The eclipse was mostly seen on July 31, 1981, except for Alaska, northwestern Canada and Northwestern Hawaiian Islands, where a partial eclipse was seen on July 30 local time, and northern Greenland, where a partial eclipse started on July 30, passing midnight and ended on July 31 due to the midnight sun.

== Observations ==
Scientists from the High Altitude Observatory of National Center for Atmospheric Research, E. O. Hulburt Center for Space Research of the United States Naval Research Laboratory and the Academy of Sciences of the Soviet Union made studies to the high altitudes of corona during the eclipse. A joint U.S.-Soviet observation team went to Bratsk, Irkutsk Oblast, Soviet Union. Scientists studied the three-dimensional structure of the corona based on coronagraph observations, images of the corona taken in Bratsk, and observations made from Solwind / P78-1 satellite.

== Eclipse details ==
Shown below are two tables displaying details about this particular solar eclipse. The first table outlines times at which the Moon's penumbra or umbra attains the specific parameter, and the second table describes various other parameters pertaining to this eclipse.

July 31, 1981 Solar Eclipse Times
Event	Time (UTC)
First Penumbral External Contact	1981 July 31 at 01:12:08.0 UTC
First Umbral External Contact	1981 July 31 at 02:18:14.0 UTC
First Central Line	1981 July 31 at 02:18:40.7 UTC
First Umbral Internal Contact	1981 July 31 at 02:19:07.5 UTC
Equatorial Conjunction	1981 July 31 at 03:36:25.8 UTC
Greatest Duration	1981 July 31 at 03:43:31.6 UTC
Greatest Eclipse	1981 July 31 at 03:46:36.6 UTC
Ecliptic Conjunction	1981 July 31 at 03:52:48.9 UTC
Last Umbral Internal Contact	1981 July 31 at 05:14:16.1 UTC
Last Central Line	1981 July 31 at 05:14:40.1 UTC
Last Umbral External Contact	1981 July 31 at 05:15:04.1 UTC
Last Penumbral External Contact	1981 July 31 at 06:21:15.5 UTC

July 31, 1981 Solar Eclipse Parameters
Parameter	Value
Eclipse Magnitude	1.02584
Eclipse Obscuration	1.05235
Gamma	0.57917
Sun Right Ascension	08h41m03.3s
Sun Declination	+18°18'24.9"
Sun Semi-Diameter	15'45.4"
Sun Equatorial Horizontal Parallax	08.7"
Moon Right Ascension	08h41m26.2s
Moon Declination	+18°51'47.8"
Moon Semi-Diameter	15'57.1"
Moon Equatorial Horizontal Parallax	0°58'32.6"
ΔT	51.8 s

== Eclipse season ==
This eclipse is part of an eclipse season, a period, roughly every six months, when eclipses occur. Only two (or occasionally three) eclipse seasons occur each year, and each season lasts about 35 days and repeats just short of six months (173 days) later; thus two full eclipse seasons always occur each year. Either two or three eclipses happen each eclipse season. In the sequence below, each eclipse is separated by a fortnight.

Eclipse season of July 1981
July 17 Descending node (full moon)	July 31 Ascending node (new moon)
Partial lunar eclipse Lunar Saros 119	Total solar eclipse Solar Saros 145

== Related eclipses ==
=== Eclipses in 1981 ===
- A penumbral lunar eclipse on January 20.
- An annular solar eclipse on February 4.
- A partial lunar eclipse on July 17.
- A total solar eclipse on July 31.

=== Metonic ===
- Preceded by: Solar eclipse of October 12, 1977
- Followed by: Solar eclipse of May 19, 1985

=== Tzolkinex ===
- Preceded by: Solar eclipse of June 20, 1974
- Followed by: Solar eclipse of September 11, 1988

=== Half-Saros ===
- Preceded by: Lunar eclipse of July 26, 1972
- Followed by: Lunar eclipse of August 6, 1990

=== Tritos ===
- Preceded by: Solar eclipse of August 31, 1970
- Followed by: Solar eclipse of June 30, 1992

=== Solar Saros 145 ===
- Preceded by: Solar eclipse of July 20, 1963
- Followed by: Solar eclipse of August 11, 1999

=== Inex ===
- Preceded by: Solar eclipse of August 20, 1952
- Followed by: Solar eclipse of July 11, 2010

=== Triad ===
- Preceded by: Solar eclipse of September 29, 1894
- Followed by: Solar eclipse of May 31, 2068

=== Solar eclipses of 1979–1982 ===
This eclipse is a member of a semester series. An eclipse in a semester series of solar eclipses repeats approximately every 177 days and 4 hours (a semester) at alternating nodes of the Moon's orbit.

The partial solar eclipses on June 21, 1982 and December 15, 1982 occur in the next lunar year eclipse set.

Solar eclipse series sets from 1979 to 1982
Descending node			Ascending node		
Saros	Map	Gamma	Saros	Map	Gamma
120 Totality in Brandon, MB, Canada	February 26, 1979 Total	0.8981	125	August 22, 1979 Annular	−0.9632
130	February 16, 1980 Total	0.2224	135	August 10, 1980 Annular	−0.1915
140	February 4, 1981 Annular	−0.4838	145	July 31, 1981 Total	0.5792
150	January 25, 1982 Partial	−1.2311	155	July 20, 1982 Partial	1.2886

=== Saros 145 ===
This eclipse is a part of Saros series 145, repeating every 18 years, 11 days, and containing 77 events. The series started with a partial solar eclipse on January 4, 1639. It contains an annular eclipse on June 6, 1891; a hybrid eclipse on June 17, 1909; and total eclipses from June 29, 1927 through September 9, 2648. The series ends at member 77 as a partial eclipse on April 17, 3009. Its eclipses are tabulated in three columns; every third eclipse in the same column is one exeligmos apart, so they all cast shadows over approximately the same parts of the Earth.

The longest duration of annularity was produced by member 15 at 6 seconds (by default) on June 6, 1891, and the longest duration of totality will be produced by member 50 at 7 minutes, 12 seconds on June 25, 2522. All eclipses in this series occur at the Moon’s ascending node of orbit.

Series members 10–32 occur between 1801 and 2200:
10	11	12
April 13, 1801	April 24, 1819	May 4, 1837
13	14	15
May 16, 1855	May 26, 1873	June 6, 1891
16	17	18
June 17, 1909	June 29, 1927	July 9, 1945
19	20	21
July 20, 1963	July 31, 1981	August 11, 1999
22	23	24
August 21, 2017	September 2, 2035	September 12, 2053
25	26	27
September 23, 2071	October 4, 2089	October 16, 2107
28	29	30
October 26, 2125	November 7, 2143	November 17, 2161
31	32	
November 28, 2179	December 9, 2197	

=== Metonic series ===
The metonic series repeats eclipses every 19 years (6939.69 days), lasting about 5 cycles. Eclipses occur in nearly the same calendar date. In addition, the octon subseries repeats 1/5 of that or every 3.8 years (1387.94 days). All eclipses in this table occur at the Moon's ascending node.

22 eclipse events between December 24, 1916 and July 31, 2000
December 24–25	October 12	July 31–August 1	May 19–20	March 7
111	113	115	117	119
December 24, 1916		July 31, 1924	May 19, 1928	March 7, 1932
121	123	125	127	129
December 25, 1935	October 12, 1939	August 1, 1943	May 20, 1947	March 7, 1951
131	133	135	137	139
December 25, 1954	October 12, 1958	July 31, 1962	May 20, 1966	March 7, 1970
141	143	145	147	149
December 24, 1973	October 12, 1977	July 31, 1981	May 19, 1985	March 7, 1989
151	153	155		
December 24, 1992	October 12, 1996	July 31, 2000		

=== Tritos series ===
This eclipse is a part of a tritos cycle, repeating at alternating nodes every 135 synodic months (≈ 3986.63 days, or 11 years minus 1 month). Their appearance and longitude are irregular due to a lack of synchronization with the anomalistic month (period of perigee), but groupings of 3 tritos cycles (≈ 33 years minus 3 months) come close (≈ 434.044 anomalistic months), so eclipses are similar in these groupings.

The partial solar eclipses on December 18, 2188 (part of Saros 164) and November 18, 2199 (part of Saros 165) are also a part of this series but are not included in the table below.

Series members between 1801 and 2134
December 10, 1806 (Saros 129)	November 9, 1817 (Saros 130)	October 9, 1828 (Saros 131)	September 7, 1839 (Saros 132)	August 7, 1850 (Saros 133)
July 8, 1861 (Saros 134)	June 6, 1872 (Saros 135)	May 6, 1883 (Saros 136)	April 6, 1894 (Saros 137)	March 6, 1905 (Saros 138)
February 3, 1916 (Saros 139)	January 3, 1927 (Saros 140)	December 2, 1937 (Saros 141)	November 1, 1948 (Saros 142)	October 2, 1959 (Saros 143)
August 31, 1970 (Saros 144)	July 31, 1981 (Saros 145)	June 30, 1992 (Saros 146)	May 31, 2003 (Saros 147)	April 29, 2014 (Saros 148)
March 29, 2025 (Saros 149)	February 27, 2036 (Saros 150)	January 26, 2047 (Saros 151)	December 26, 2057 (Saros 152)	November 24, 2068 (Saros 153)
October 24, 2079 (Saros 154)	September 23, 2090 (Saros 155)	August 24, 2101 (Saros 156)	July 23, 2112 (Saros 157)	June 23, 2123 (Saros 158)
May 23, 2134 (Saros 159)

=== Inex series ===
This eclipse is a part of the long period inex cycle, repeating at alternating nodes, every 358 synodic months (≈ 10,571.95 days, or 29 years minus 20 days). Their appearance and longitude are irregular due to a lack of synchronization with the anomalistic month (period of perigee). However, groupings of 3 inex cycles (≈ 87 years minus 2 months) comes close (≈ 1,151.02 anomalistic months), so eclipses are similar in these groupings.

Series members between 1801 and 2200
November 29, 1807 (Saros 139)	November 9, 1836 (Saros 140)	October 19, 1865 (Saros 141)
September 29, 1894 (Saros 142)	September 10, 1923 (Saros 143)	August 20, 1952 (Saros 144)
July 31, 1981 (Saros 145)	July 11, 2010 (Saros 146)	June 21, 2039 (Saros 147)
May 31, 2068 (Saros 148)	May 11, 2097 (Saros 149)	April 22, 2126 (Saros 150)
April 2, 2155 (Saros 151)	March 12, 2184 (Saros 152)	
