= Fifty lei =

Romanian Banknote

- Country: Romania
- Value: 50 Romanian leu
- Width: 140 mm
- Height: 77 mm
- Security features: watermark, security thread, transparent window, microprinting, blacklight printing, micro perforations, latent writing, EURion constellation
- Material used: polymer
- Years of printing: since 2005

Obverse
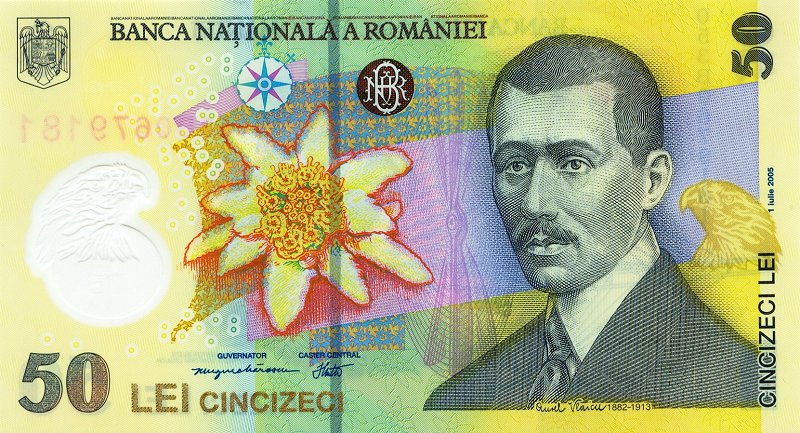
- Design: Aurel Vlaicu, Edelweiss, a two-blade propeller
- Designer: National Bank of Romania
- Design date: 2005

Reverse
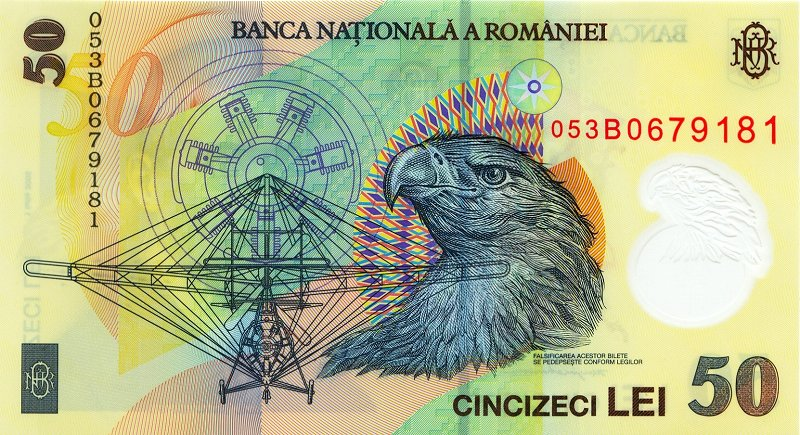
- Design: A Vlaicu II airplane design, the head of an eagle, a sketch of an airplane motor.
- Designer: National Bank of Romania
- Design date: 2005

The fifty lei banknote is one of the circulating denomination of the Romanian leu. It is the same size as the 50 euro note.

The main color of the banknote is yellow. It pictures, on the obverse, pilot and engineer Aurel Vlaicu, and on the reverse the A Vlaicu Nr. II airplane design, the head of an eagle, and the sketch of the Gnome motor of his airplane.

== History ==
In earlier times, the denomination was also in the coin form, as follows:

First leu (1867–1947)

- banknote issue: 1877 (the hypothecary issue)
- coin issues: 1906 (gold, celebration issue), 1937 (re-issue: 1938)

Second leu (1947–1952)

- no issues

Third leu – ROL (1952–2005)

- banknote issue: 1966
- coin issue: 1991 (re-issues: 1992, 1993, 1994, 1995, 1996)

Fourth leu – RON (since 2005)

- banknote issue: 2005 (redesigned issue of the former 500.000 lei banknote, whereas 500.000 third lei = 50 fourth lei)

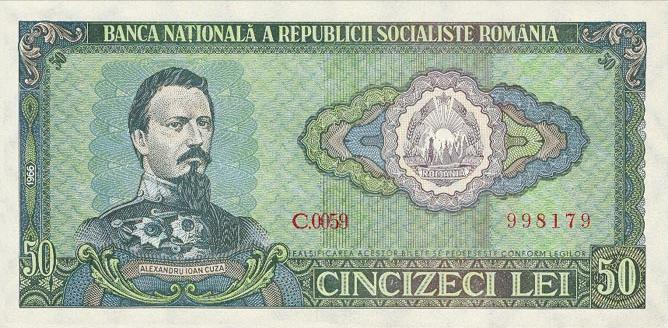
Obverse

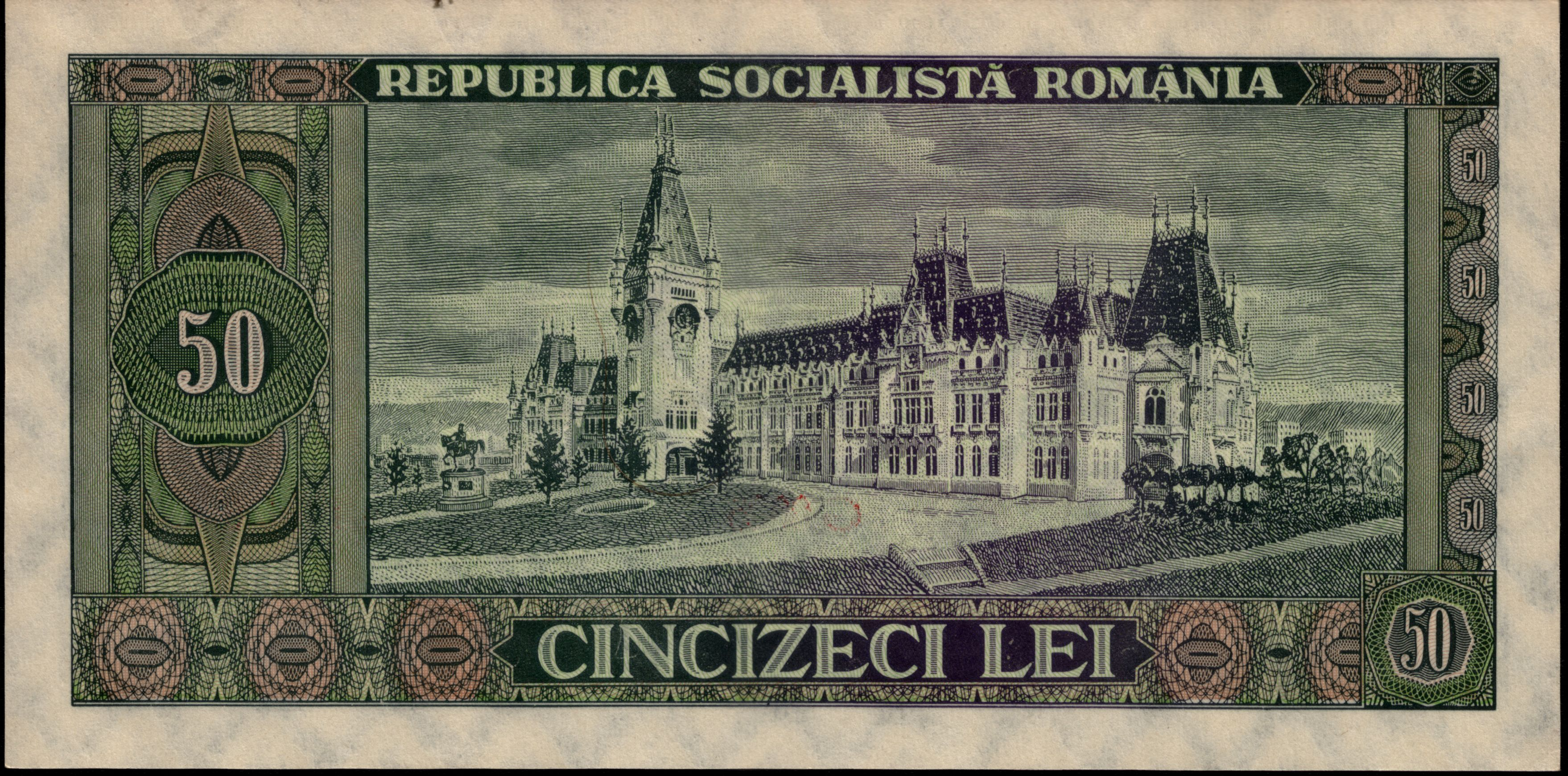
Reverse

1966 50 lei issue
