= Solar eclipse of September 11, 1988 =

20th-century annular solar eclipse

- Annular eclipse
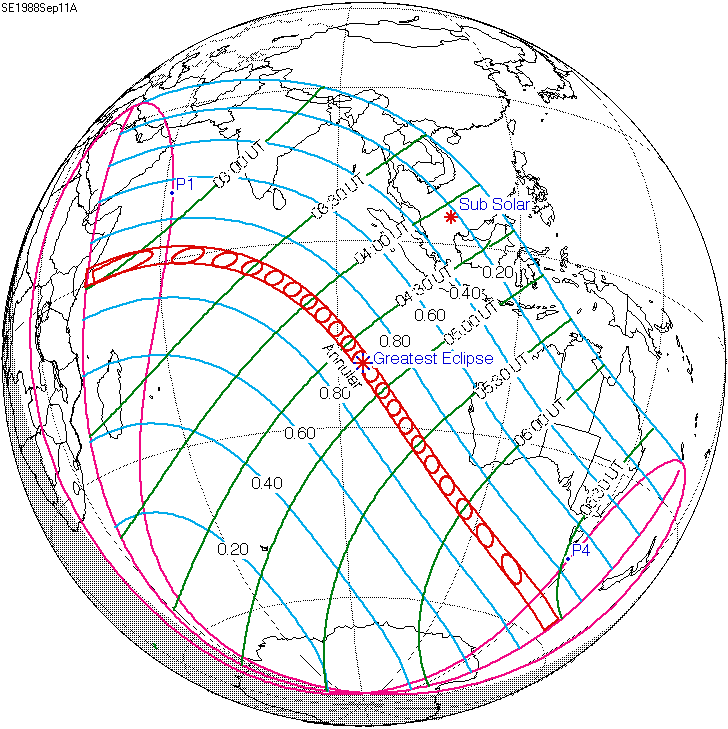
- Map
- Gamma: −0.4681
- Magnitude: 0.9377

Maximum eclipse
- Duration: 417 s (6 min 57 s)
- Coordinates: 20°S 94.4°E
- Max. width of band: 258 km (160 mi)

Times (UTC)
- Greatest eclipse: 4:44:29

References
- Saros: 144 (15 of 70)
- Catalog # (SE5000): 9483

An annular solar eclipse occurred at the Moon's descending node of orbit on Sunday, September 11, 1988, with a magnitude of 0.9377. A solar eclipse occurs when the Moon passes between Earth and the Sun, thereby totally or partly obscuring the image of the Sun for a viewer on Earth. An annular solar eclipse occurs when the Moon's apparent diameter is smaller than the Sun's, blocking most of the Sun's light and causing the Sun to look like an annulus (ring). An annular eclipse appears as a partial eclipse over a region of the Earth thousands of kilometres wide. Occurring only 12.5 hours after apogee (on September 10, 1988, at 16:10 UTC), the Moon's apparent diameter was smaller.

Annularity was visible in southeastern Somalia (including the capital city Mogadishu), the Indian Ocean and Macquarie Island of Australia. A partial eclipse was visible for parts of East Africa, the Middle East, South Asia, Southeast Asia, Australia, and New Zealand.

== Eclipse timing ==
=== Places experiencing annular eclipse ===
Solar Eclipse of September 11, 1988 (Local Times)
Country or territory	City or place	Start of partial eclipse	Start of annular eclipse	Maximum eclipse	End of annular eclipse	End of partial eclipse	Duration of annularity (min:s)	Duration of eclipse (hr:min)	Maximum coverage
Somalia	Mogadishu	05:51:19 (sunrise)	05:55:52	05:57:34	05:59:14	07:12:01	3:22	1:21	85.69%

=== Places experiencing partial eclipse ===
Solar Eclipse of September 11, 1988 (Local Times)
Country or territory	City or place	Start of partial eclipse	Maximum eclipse	End of partial eclipse	Duration of eclipse (hr:min)	Maximum coverage
Yemen	Aden	05:49:01 (sunrise)	05:51:12	06:57:42	1:09	53.26%
Yemen	Sanaa	05:51:22 (sunrise)	05:53:35	06:53:25	1:02	44.25%
Somalia	Galkayo	05:41:25 (sunrise)	05:53:56	07:07:40	1:26	73.60%
India	Mumbai	07:21:31	08:25:59	09:38:33	2:17	30.25%
Somalia	Hargeisa	05:53:58 (sunrise)	05:57:31	07:01:40	1:08	62.15%
Ethiopia	Kebri Dahar	05:54:02 (sunrise)	05:57:31	07:05:29	1:11	71.93%
Ethiopia	Degehabur	05:56:26 (sunrise)	05:58:35	07:03:08	1:07	66.01%
Djibouti	Djibouti	05:56:57 (sunrise)	05:59:09	06:58:24	1:01	54.12%
India	Bengaluru	07:21:12	08:35:41	10:00:55	2:40	44.09%
Somalia	Kismayo	06:03:15 (sunrise)	06:06:35	07:12:43	1:09	79.45%
Seychelles	Victoria	06:12:58 (sunrise)	07:08:26	08:31:57	2:19	74.99%
India	Thiruvananthapuram	07:21:14	08:40:40	10:12:38	2:51	57.93%
Comoros	Moroni	06:03:57 (sunrise)	06:12:43	07:25:05	1:21	55.49%
Maldives	Malé	06:51:38	08:12:47	09:47:55	2:56	74.18%
Mayotte	Mamoudzou	05:56:25 (sunrise)	06:14:51	07:28:08	1:32	52.43%
Sri Lanka	Sri Jayawardenepura Kotte	07:24:17	08:46:41	10:21:46	2:57	59.27%
Mozambique	Pemba	05:15:20 (sunrise)	05:17:31	06:23:59	1:09	52.29%
Ethiopia	Addis Ababa	06:15:23 (sunrise)	06:17:33	06:59:47	0:44	41.84%
Tanzania	Dar es Salaam	06:18:18 (sunrise)	06:20:31	07:17:16	0:59	59.47%
Madagascar	Antananarivo	05:49:13 (sunrise)	06:25:45	07:37:11	1:48	38.18%
Kenya	Nairobi	06:26:26 (sunrise)	06:28:35	07:10:28	0:44	44.84%
British Indian Ocean Territory	Diego Garcia	07:06:06	08:31:09	10:11:14	3:05	78.45%
Mauritius	Port Louis	06:27:48	07:36:40	08:56:09	2:28	38.03%
Singapore	Singapore	10:42:02	12:06:33	13:35:01	2:53	27.59%
Cocos (Keeling) Islands	Bantam	09:15:28	10:58:20	12:45:55	3:30	71.53%
Indonesia	Jakarta	09:59:44	11:31:41	13:05:08	3:05	34.16%
Australia	Perth	12:08:56	13:48:06	15:19:50	3:11	67.21%
Antarctica	Dumont d'Urville Station	15:00:22	16:11:56	17:20:12	2:20	53.31%
New Zealand	Oban	17:27:38	18:26:44	18:29:51 (sunset)	1:02	56.26%
Australia	Melbourne	15:13:55	16:29:25	17:37:19	2:23	41.95%

== Eclipse details ==
Shown below are two tables displaying details about this particular solar eclipse. The first table outlines times at which the Moon's penumbra or umbra attains the specific parameter, and the second table describes various other parameters pertaining to this eclipse.

September 11, 1988 Solar Eclipse Times
Event	Time (UTC)
First Penumbral External Contact	1988 September 11 at 01:46:36.7 UTC
First Umbral External Contact	1988 September 11 at 02:56:30.0 UTC
First Central Line	1988 September 11 at 02:59:28.7 UTC
First Umbral Internal Contact	1988 September 11 at 03:02:28.6 UTC
Greatest Duration	1988 September 11 at 04:35:51.5 UTC
Greatest Eclipse	1988 September 11 at 04:44:28.7 UTC
Ecliptic Conjunction	1988 September 11 at 04:50:04.6 UTC
Equatorial Conjunction	1988 September 11 at 05:15:01.8 UTC
Last Umbral Internal Contact	1988 September 11 at 06:26:09.7 UTC
Last Central Line	1988 September 11 at 06:29:09.8 UTC
Last Umbral External Contact	1988 September 11 at 06:32:08.7 UTC
Last Penumbral External Contact	1988 September 11 at 07:42:08.2 UTC

September 11, 1988 Solar Eclipse Parameters
Parameter	Value
Eclipse Magnitude	0.93768
Eclipse Obscuration	0.87924
Gamma	−0.46811
Sun Right Ascension	11h18m19.4s
Sun Declination	+04°29'02.7"
Sun Semi-Diameter	15'53.3"
Sun Equatorial Horizontal Parallax	08.7"
Moon Right Ascension	11h17m30.7s
Moon Declination	+04°06'57.9"
Moon Semi-Diameter	14'42.2"
Moon Equatorial Horizontal Parallax	0°53'57.6"
ΔT	56.1 s

== Eclipse season ==
This eclipse is part of an eclipse season, a period, roughly every six months, when eclipses occur. Only two (or occasionally three) eclipse seasons occur each year, and each season lasts about 35 days and repeats just short of six months (173 days) later; thus two full eclipse seasons always occur each year. Either two or three eclipses happen each eclipse season. In the sequence below, each eclipse is separated by a fortnight.

Eclipse season of August–September 1988
August 27 Ascending node (full moon)	September 11 Descending node (new moon)
Partial lunar eclipse Lunar Saros 118	Annular solar eclipse Solar Saros 144

== Related eclipses ==
=== Eclipses in 1988 ===
- A penumbral lunar eclipse on March 3.
- A total solar eclipse on March 18.
- A partial lunar eclipse on August 27.
- An annular solar eclipse on September 11.

=== Metonic ===
- Preceded by: Solar eclipse of November 22, 1984
- Followed by: Solar eclipse of June 30, 1992

=== Tzolkinex ===
- Preceded by: Solar eclipse of July 31, 1981
- Followed by: Solar eclipse of October 24, 1995

=== Half-Saros ===
- Preceded by: Lunar eclipse of September 6, 1979
- Followed by: Lunar eclipse of September 16, 1997

=== Tritos ===
- Preceded by: Solar eclipse of October 12, 1977
- Followed by: Solar eclipse of August 11, 1999

=== Solar Saros 144 ===
- Preceded by: Solar eclipse of August 31, 1970
- Followed by: Solar eclipse of September 22, 2006

=== Inex ===
- Preceded by: Solar eclipse of October 2, 1959
- Followed by: Solar eclipse of August 21, 2017

=== Triad ===
- Preceded by: Solar eclipse of November 11, 1901
- Followed by: Solar eclipse of July 13, 2075

=== Solar eclipses of 1986–1989 ===
This eclipse is a member of a semester series. An eclipse in a semester series of solar eclipses repeats approximately every 177 days and 4 hours (a semester) at alternating nodes of the Moon's orbit.

Solar eclipse series sets from 1986 to 1989
Ascending node			Descending node		
Saros	Map	Gamma	Saros	Map	Gamma
119	April 9, 1986 Partial	−1.0822	124	October 3, 1986 Hybrid	0.9931
129	March 29, 1987 Hybrid	−0.3053	134	September 23, 1987 Annular	0.2787
139	March 18, 1988 Total	0.4188	144	September 11, 1988 Annular	−0.4681
149	March 7, 1989 Partial	1.0981	154	August 31, 1989 Partial	−1.1928

=== Saros 144 ===
This eclipse is a part of Saros series 144, repeating every 18 years, 11 days, and containing 70 events. The series started with a partial solar eclipse on April 11, 1736. It contains annular eclipses from July 7, 1880 through August 27, 2565. There are no hybrid or total eclipses in this set. The series ends at member 70 as a partial eclipse on May 5, 2980. Its eclipses are tabulated in three columns; every third eclipse in the same column is one exeligmos apart, so they all cast shadows over approximately the same parts of the Earth.

The longest duration of annularity will be produced by member 51 at 9 minutes, 52 seconds on December 29, 2168. All eclipses in this series occur at the Moon’s descending node of orbit.

Series members 5–26 occur between 1801 and 2200:
5	6	7
May 25, 1808	June 5, 1826	June 16, 1844
8	9	10
June 27, 1862	July 7, 1880	July 18, 1898
11	12	13
July 30, 1916	August 10, 1934	August 20, 1952
14	15	16
August 31, 1970	September 11, 1988	September 22, 2006
17	18	19
October 2, 2024	October 14, 2042	October 24, 2060
20	21	22
November 4, 2078	November 15, 2096	November 27, 2114
23	24	25
December 7, 2132	December 19, 2150	December 29, 2168
26
January 9, 2187

=== Metonic series ===
The metonic series repeats eclipses every 19 years (6939.69 days), lasting about 5 cycles. Eclipses occur in nearly the same calendar date. In addition, the octon subseries repeats 1/5 of that or every 3.8 years (1387.94 days). All eclipses in this table occur at the Moon's descending node.

22 eclipse events between September 12, 1931 and July 1, 2011
September 11–12	June 30–July 1	April 17–19	February 4–5	November 22–23
114	116	118	120	122
September 12, 1931	June 30, 1935	April 19, 1939	February 4, 1943	November 23, 1946
124	126	128	130	132
September 12, 1950	June 30, 1954	April 19, 1958	February 5, 1962	November 23, 1965
134	136	138	140	142
September 11, 1969	June 30, 1973	April 18, 1977	February 4, 1981	November 22, 1984
144	146	148	150	152
September 11, 1988	June 30, 1992	April 17, 1996	February 5, 2000	November 23, 2003
154	156			
September 11, 2007	July 1, 2011			

=== Tritos series ===
This eclipse is a part of a tritos cycle, repeating at alternating nodes every 135 synodic months (≈ 3986.63 days, or 11 years minus 1 month). Their appearance and longitude are irregular due to a lack of synchronization with the anomalistic month (period of perigee), but groupings of 3 tritos cycles (≈ 33 years minus 3 months) come close (≈ 434.044 anomalistic months), so eclipses are similar in these groupings.

Series members between 1801 and 2200
February 21, 1803 (Saros 127)	January 21, 1814 (Saros 128)	December 20, 1824 (Saros 129)	November 20, 1835 (Saros 130)	October 20, 1846 (Saros 131)
September 18, 1857 (Saros 132)	August 18, 1868 (Saros 133)	July 19, 1879 (Saros 134)	June 17, 1890 (Saros 135)	May 18, 1901 (Saros 136)
April 17, 1912 (Saros 137)	March 17, 1923 (Saros 138)	February 14, 1934 (Saros 139)	January 14, 1945 (Saros 140)	December 14, 1955 (Saros 141)
November 12, 1966 (Saros 142)	October 12, 1977 (Saros 143)	September 11, 1988 (Saros 144)	August 11, 1999 (Saros 145)	July 11, 2010 (Saros 146)
June 10, 2021 (Saros 147)	May 9, 2032 (Saros 148)	April 9, 2043 (Saros 149)	March 9, 2054 (Saros 150)	February 5, 2065 (Saros 151)
January 6, 2076 (Saros 152)	December 6, 2086 (Saros 153)	November 4, 2097 (Saros 154)	October 5, 2108 (Saros 155)	September 5, 2119 (Saros 156)
August 4, 2130 (Saros 157)	July 3, 2141 (Saros 158)	June 3, 2152 (Saros 159)		April 1, 2174 (Saros 161)

=== Inex series ===
This eclipse is a part of the long period inex cycle, repeating at alternating nodes, every 358 synodic months (≈ 10,571.95 days, or 29 years minus 20 days). Their appearance and longitude are irregular due to a lack of synchronization with the anomalistic month (period of perigee). However, groupings of 3 inex cycles (≈ 87 years minus 2 months) comes close (≈ 1,151.02 anomalistic months), so eclipses are similar in these groupings.

Series members between 1801 and 2200
January 10, 1815 (Saros 138)	December 21, 1843 (Saros 139)	November 30, 1872 (Saros 140)
November 11, 1901 (Saros 141)	October 21, 1930 (Saros 142)	October 2, 1959 (Saros 143)
September 11, 1988 (Saros 144)	August 21, 2017 (Saros 145)	August 2, 2046 (Saros 146)
July 13, 2075 (Saros 147)	June 22, 2104 (Saros 148)	June 3, 2133 (Saros 149)
May 14, 2162 (Saros 150)	April 23, 2191 (Saros 151)	
