= Solar eclipse of August 31, 1970 =

20th-century annular solar eclipse

- Annular eclipse
- Map
- Gamma: −0.5364
- Magnitude: 0.94

Maximum eclipse
- Duration: 407 s (6 min 47 s)
- Coordinates: 20.3°S 164°W
- Max. width of band: 258 km (160 mi)

Times (UTC)
- Greatest eclipse: 21:55:30

References
- Saros: 144 (14 of 70)
- Catalog # (SE5000): 9443

An annular solar eclipse occurred at the Moon's descending node of orbit between Monday, August 31 and Tuesday, September 1, 1970, with a magnitude of 0.94. A solar eclipse occurs when the Moon passes between Earth and the Sun, thereby totally or partly obscuring the image of the Sun for a viewer on Earth. An annular solar eclipse occurs when the Moon's apparent diameter is smaller than the Sun's, blocking most of the Sun's light and causing the Sun to look like an annulus (ring). An annular eclipse appears as a partial eclipse over a region of the Earth thousands of kilometres wide. Occurring about 20 hours after apogee (on August 31, 1970, at 2:00 UTC), the Moon's apparent diameter was smaller.

Annularity was visible from the Territory of Papua and New Guinea (today's Papua New Guinea), Gilbert and Ellice Islands (the part that belongs to Tuvalu now) on September 1 (Tuesday), West Samoa (name changed to Samoa later) and the whole American Samoa except Swains Island on August 31 (Monday). A partial eclipse was visible for parts of Eastern Australia, Oceania, and Antarctica.

== Eclipse details ==
Shown below are two tables displaying details about this particular solar eclipse. The first table outlines times at which the Moon's penumbra or umbra attains the specific parameter, and the second table describes various other parameters pertaining to this eclipse.

August 31, 1970 Solar Eclipse Times
Event	Time (UTC)
First Penumbral External Contact	1970 August 31 at 19:00:38.3 UTC
First Umbral External Contact	1970 August 31 at 20:12:19.4 UTC
First Central Line	1970 August 31 at 20:15:18.7 UTC
First Umbral Internal Contact	1970 August 31 at 20:18:19.6 UTC
Greatest Duration	1970 August 31 at 21:42:42.2 UTC
Greatest Eclipse	1970 August 31 at 21:55:29.9 UTC
Ecliptic Conjunction	1970 August 31 at 22:01:53.6 UTC
Equatorial Conjunction	1970 August 31 at 22:28:51.4 UTC
Last Umbral Internal Contact	1970 August 31 at 23:32:19.4 UTC
Last Central Line	1970 August 31 at 23:35:20.4 UTC
Last Umbral External Contact	1970 August 31 at 23:38:19.7 UTC
Last Penumbral External Contact	1970 September 1 at 00:50:07.5 UTC

August 31, 1970 Solar Eclipse Parameters
Parameter	Value
Eclipse Magnitude	0.93997
Eclipse Obscuration	0.88354
Gamma	−0.53640
Sun Right Ascension	10h38m53.2s
Sun Declination	+08°32'52.7"
Sun Semi-Diameter	15'50.8"
Sun Equatorial Horizontal Parallax	08.7"
Moon Right Ascension	10h37m59.0s
Moon Declination	+08°07'17.6"
Moon Semi-Diameter	14'42.6"
Moon Equatorial Horizontal Parallax	0°53'59.0"
ΔT	40.8 s

== Eclipse season ==
This eclipse is part of an eclipse season, a period, roughly every six months, when eclipses occur. Only two (or occasionally three) eclipse seasons occur each year, and each season lasts about 35 days and repeats just short of six months (173 days) later; thus two full eclipse seasons always occur each year. Either two or three eclipses happen each eclipse season. In the sequence below, each eclipse is separated by a fortnight.

Eclipse season of August 1970
August 17 Ascending node (full moon)	August 31 Descending node (new moon)
Partial lunar eclipse Lunar Saros 118	Annular solar eclipse Solar Saros 144

== Related eclipses ==
=== Eclipses in 1970 ===
- A partial lunar eclipse on February 21.
- A total solar eclipse on March 7.
- A partial lunar eclipse on August 17.
- An annular solar eclipse on August 31.

=== Metonic ===
- Preceded by: Solar eclipse of November 12, 1966
- Followed by: Solar eclipse of June 20, 1974

=== Tzolkinex ===
- Preceded by: Solar eclipse of July 20, 1963
- Followed by: Solar eclipse of October 12, 1977

=== Half-Saros ===
- Preceded by: Lunar eclipse of August 26, 1961
- Followed by: Lunar eclipse of September 6, 1979

=== Tritos ===
- Preceded by: Solar eclipse of October 2, 1959
- Followed by: Solar eclipse of July 31, 1981

=== Solar Saros 144 ===
- Preceded by: Solar eclipse of August 20, 1952
- Followed by: Solar eclipse of September 11, 1988

=== Inex ===
- Preceded by: Solar eclipse of September 21, 1941
- Followed by: Solar eclipse of August 11, 1999

=== Triad ===
- Preceded by: Solar eclipse of October 30, 1883
- Followed by: Solar eclipse of July 1, 2057

=== Solar eclipses of 1968–1971 ===
This eclipse is a member of a semester series. An eclipse in a semester series of solar eclipses repeats approximately every 177 days and 4 hours (a semester) at alternating nodes of the Moon's orbit.

The partial solar eclipse on July 22, 1971 occurs in the next lunar year eclipse set.

Solar eclipse series sets from 1968 to 1971
Ascending node			Descending node		
Saros	Map	Gamma	Saros	Map	Gamma
119	March 28, 1968 Partial	−1.037	124	September 22, 1968 Total	0.9451
129	March 18, 1969 Annular	−0.2704	134	September 11, 1969 Annular	0.2201
139 Totality in Williamston, NC; USA	March 7, 1970 Total	0.4473	144	August 31, 1970 Annular	−0.5364
149	February 25, 1971 Partial	1.1188	154	August 20, 1971 Partial	−1.2659

=== Saros 144 ===
This eclipse is a part of Saros series 144, repeating every 18 years, 11 days, and containing 70 events. The series started with a partial solar eclipse on April 11, 1736. It contains annular eclipses from July 7, 1880 through August 27, 2565. There are no hybrid or total eclipses in this set. The series ends at member 70 as a partial eclipse on May 5, 2980. Its eclipses are tabulated in three columns; every third eclipse in the same column is one exeligmos apart, so they all cast shadows over approximately the same parts of the Earth.

The longest duration of annularity will be produced by member 51 at 9 minutes, 52 seconds on December 29, 2168. All eclipses in this series occur at the Moon’s descending node of orbit.

Series members 5–26 occur between 1801 and 2200:
5	6	7
May 25, 1808	June 5, 1826	June 16, 1844
8	9	10
June 27, 1862	July 7, 1880	July 18, 1898
11	12	13
July 30, 1916	August 10, 1934	August 20, 1952
14	15	16
August 31, 1970	September 11, 1988	September 22, 2006
17	18	19
October 2, 2024	October 14, 2042	October 24, 2060
20	21	22
November 4, 2078	November 15, 2096	November 27, 2114
23	24	25
December 7, 2132	December 19, 2150	December 29, 2168
26
January 9, 2187

=== Metonic series ===
The metonic series repeats eclipses every 19 years (6939.69 days), lasting about 5 cycles. Eclipses occur in nearly the same calendar date. In addition, the octon subseries repeats 1/5 of that or every 3.8 years (1387.94 days). All eclipses in this table occur at the Moon's descending node.

22 eclipse events between April 8, 1902 and August 31, 1989
April 7–8	January 24–25	November 12	August 31–September 1	June 19–20
108	110	112	114	116
April 8, 1902			August 31, 1913	June 19, 1917
118	120	122	124	126
April 8, 1921	January 24, 1925	November 12, 1928	August 31, 1932	June 19, 1936
128	130	132	134	136
April 7, 1940	January 25, 1944	November 12, 1947	September 1, 1951	June 20, 1955
138	140	142	144	146
April 8, 1959	January 25, 1963	November 12, 1966	August 31, 1970	June 20, 1974
148	150	152	154	
April 7, 1978	January 25, 1982	November 12, 1985	August 31, 1989	

=== Tritos series ===
This eclipse is a part of a tritos cycle, repeating at alternating nodes every 135 synodic months (≈ 3986.63 days, or 11 years minus 1 month). Their appearance and longitude are irregular due to a lack of synchronization with the anomalistic month (period of perigee), but groupings of 3 tritos cycles (≈ 33 years minus 3 months) come close (≈ 434.044 anomalistic months), so eclipses are similar in these groupings.

The partial solar eclipses on December 18, 2188 (part of Saros 164) and November 18, 2199 (part of Saros 165) are also a part of this series but are not included in the table below.

Series members between 1801 and 2134
December 10, 1806 (Saros 129)	November 9, 1817 (Saros 130)	October 9, 1828 (Saros 131)	September 7, 1839 (Saros 132)	August 7, 1850 (Saros 133)
July 8, 1861 (Saros 134)	June 6, 1872 (Saros 135)	May 6, 1883 (Saros 136)	April 6, 1894 (Saros 137)	March 6, 1905 (Saros 138)
February 3, 1916 (Saros 139)	January 3, 1927 (Saros 140)	December 2, 1937 (Saros 141)	November 1, 1948 (Saros 142)	October 2, 1959 (Saros 143)
August 31, 1970 (Saros 144)	July 31, 1981 (Saros 145)	June 30, 1992 (Saros 146)	May 31, 2003 (Saros 147)	April 29, 2014 (Saros 148)
March 29, 2025 (Saros 149)	February 27, 2036 (Saros 150)	January 26, 2047 (Saros 151)	December 26, 2057 (Saros 152)	November 24, 2068 (Saros 153)
October 24, 2079 (Saros 154)	September 23, 2090 (Saros 155)	August 24, 2101 (Saros 156)	July 23, 2112 (Saros 157)	June 23, 2123 (Saros 158)
May 23, 2134 (Saros 159)

=== Inex series ===
This eclipse is a part of the long period inex cycle, repeating at alternating nodes, every 358 synodic months (≈ 10,571.95 days, or 29 years minus 20 days). Their appearance and longitude are irregular due to a lack of synchronization with the anomalistic month (period of perigee). However, groupings of 3 inex cycles (≈ 87 years minus 2 months) comes close (≈ 1,151.02 anomalistic months), so eclipses are similar in these groupings.

Series members between 1801 and 2200
December 9, 1825 (Saros 139)	November 20, 1854 (Saros 140)	October 30, 1883 (Saros 141)
October 10, 1912 (Saros 142)	September 21, 1941 (Saros 143)	August 31, 1970 (Saros 144)
August 11, 1999 (Saros 145)	July 22, 2028 (Saros 146)	July 1, 2057 (Saros 147)
June 11, 2086 (Saros 148)	May 24, 2115 (Saros 149)	May 3, 2144 (Saros 150)
April 12, 2173 (Saros 151)		
