= Solar eclipse of August 11, 1999 =

Eclipse over Europe and Asia

- Total eclipse
- Totality from France

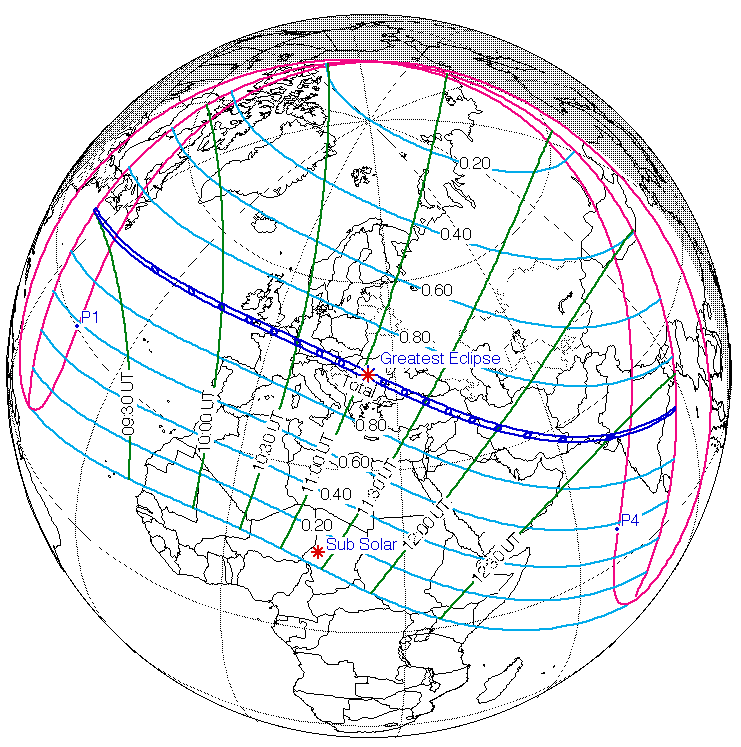
- Map
- Gamma: 0.5062
- Magnitude: 1.0286

Maximum eclipse
- Duration: 143 s (2 min 23 s)
- Location: Ocnele Mari, Vâlcea County, Romania
- Coordinates: 45.1°N 24.3°E
- Max. width of band: 112 km (70 mi)

Times (UTC)
- Greatest eclipse: 11:04:09

References
- Saros: 145 (21 of 77)
- Catalog # (SE5000): 9506

A total solar eclipse occurred at the Moon's ascending node of orbit on Wednesday, August 11, 1999, with a magnitude of 1.0286. It is considered to be one of the most-viewed total solar eclipses in human history. A solar eclipse is when the Moon passes between the Earth and the Sun, thereby totally or partly obscuring the light of the sun for a viewer on earth. A total solar eclipse is when the Moon's apparent diameter is larger than the Sun's, blocking all direct sunlight, turning day into night. Totality occurs in a narrow path across Earth's surface, with the partial solar eclipse visible over a surrounding region thousands of kilometres wide. Occurring about 3.5 days after perigee (on August 8, 1999, at 0:30 UTC), the Moon's apparent diameter was larger.

It was the first total eclipse visible from Europe since July 22, 1990, and the first visible in the United Kingdom since June 29, 1927.

The path of the Moon's shadow began in the Atlantic Ocean roughly 300 km (190 mi) south of Nova Scotia, and was later traversing the southwest United Kingdom (Cornwall and Devon), part of the British crown dependency Guernsey, northern France, the southern edge of Belgium, Luxembourg, southern Germany, Austria, the extreme northeastern tip of Slovenia, Hungary, and northern Yugoslavia (Vojvodina). The eclipse's maximum was at 11:03 UTC at 45.1°N 24.3°E in Romania near the town of Râmnicu Vâlcea. From there, it continued across Romania, including its capital Bucharest, then traversing northeast Bulgaria, the Black Sea, Turkey, the northeastern tip of Syria, northern Iraq, Iran, southern Pakistan, south-central India, and ended in the Bay of Bengal.

A partial eclipse was visible for parts of eastern Canada, Greenland, all of Europe, North Africa, the Middle East, Central Asia, South Asia, and western China.

== Observations ==
Animated path.

Interactive map of the path of the Umbral Shadow

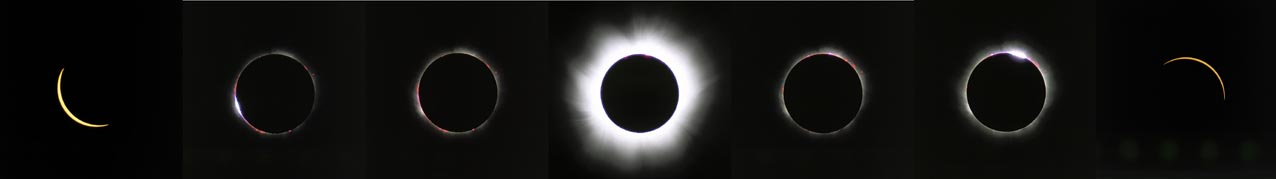
The eclipse as seen from France.

Because of the high population densities in areas of the path, this was one of the most-viewed total solar eclipses in human history; although some areas in the path of totality (mainly in Western Europe) offered impaired visibility due to adverse weather conditions.

Some of the organized eclipse-watching parties along the path of totality set up video projectors on which people could watch the Moon's shadow as it raced towards them. There was substantial coverage on international TV stations of the progress of the eclipse shadow. The Moon's shadow was also observed from the Russian Mir space station; during the eclipse, video from Mir was broadcast live on television.

- The BBC concentrated its coverage efforts on the first landfall of the shadow across the western end of Cornwall (from St Ives to Lizard), which was packed with an extraordinary number of visitors, although Cornwall did not have nearly as many spectators as expected leading many organised events to host smaller audiences than anticipated. The veteran amateur astronomer, broadcaster and eclipse-watcher Patrick Moore was brought in to head a live programme, but the eclipse was clouded out. BBC One also produced a special version of their Balloon Idents for the event. The BBC did not have a presence at Goonhilly on the Lizard Peninsula, one of the few places in Cornwall where the clouds parted just in time for the total eclipse to be visible. There was extensive cloud in Perranporth which parted just in time, allowing the very large crowd that had filled the beach and hillsides to witness the event.
- Some of the best viewing conditions were to be had mid-Channel, where ferries were halted in calm conditions to obtain an excellent view. Hundreds of people who gathered on the island of Alderney also experienced the event.
- Also at sea, many of the Fastnet fleet contestants encountered totality crossing the Celtic Sea on their way to the Fastnet Rock.
- A gathering of several thousand people at the airport in Soissons, France, which was on the path of totality, were denied all but a few fleeting glimpses of the eclipse through the overcast sky. The clouds cleared completely just a few minutes after the eclipse.
- In contrast, the overcast sky in Amiens, France, where thousands had gathered, cleared only minutes before the eclipse began.
- Further inland, viewing conditions were also perfect at Vouziers, a French country town gridlocked by Belgian cars from day-visitors. The patchy cloud covering cleared a short time before the shadow arrived. Some photos from Vouziers were used on the subsequent BBC Sky at Night programme.
- The San Francisco Exploratorium featured a live webcast from a crowded town square in Amasya, Turkey.
- Doordarshan, the national TV channel in India, broadcast live coverage from Srikakulam, hosted by TV personality Mona Bhattacharya.
- A Bulgarian Air Force MiG-21 two-seater was used by the Bulgarian Academy of Sciences to study the solar corona. The MiG-21, flying at 1600–1700 km/h (1000 to 1100 mph) (Mach 1.4-1.5) at an altitude of 13,000 metres (43,000 feet), was able to stay in the moon's umbra for 6 minutes. The photographer, an air force pilot, used two film cameras, both fitted with 200 mm lenses and infrared filters, and one Digital8 video camera.
- Hungary's most popular tourist destination, Lake Balaton and its surrounding area, fell into the path of the eclipse entirely, which made the area even more popular for the day. The motorway leading to the city was so crowded that many people had to watch the eclipse while caught in a traffic jam.
- One French and two British Concordes briefly followed the eclipse with tourists on board.
- The BBC was filming one of its episodes for the TV series Airport that day and, during the show, resident press officers Russell Clisby and Steve Meller took photographs of the eclipse at Heathrow Airport, as well as Aeroflot supervisor Jeremy Spake witnessing the eclipse on a special charter flight.
- RTS, the national public broadcaster of Serbia, urged people to remain inside, citing dangers to public health. This caused the streets of all Serbian cities, towns and villages to be entirely deserted during the eclipse (97% of Serbs stayed inside), with many opting to watch it on TV instead.
- The BMJ, a month after the eclipse, reported only 14 cases of eye damage in the UK from improper viewing of the eclipse - a number lower than initially feared. In one of the most serious cases the patient had looked at the Sun without eye protection for twenty minutes, but overall the public health campaign had succeeded.

== Eclipse timing ==
=== Places experiencing total eclipse ===
Solar Eclipse of August 11, 1999 (Local Times)
| Country or territory | City or place | Start of partial eclipse | Start of total eclipse | Maximum eclipse | End of total eclipse | End of partial eclipse | Duration of totality (min:s) | Duration of eclipse (hr:min) | Maximum magnitude |
|---|---|---|---|---|---|---|---|---|---|
| United Kingdom | Plymouth | 09:58:24 | 11:13:02 | 11:13:53 | 11:14:44 | 12:34:05 | 1:42 | 2:36 | 1.0061 |
| Guernsey | Saint Anne | 09:59:45 | 11:15:28 | 11:16:18 | 11:17:09 | 12:37:24 | 1:41 | 2:38 | 1.0058 |
| France | Châlons-en-Champagne | 11:06:52 | 12:25:50 | 12:26:14 | 12:26:38 | 13:48:49 | 0:48 | 2:42 | 1.0013 |
| Belgium | Arlon | 11:09:15 | 12:28:05 | 12:28:37 | 12:29:09 | 13:50:45 | 1:04 | 2:42 | 1.002 |
| Luxembourg | Differdange | 11:09:14 | 12:27:49 | 12:28:44 | 12:29:39 | 13:51:00 | 1:50 | 2:42 | 1.0063 |
| Luxembourg | Esch-sur-Alzette | 11:09:20 | 12:27:57 | 12:28:53 | 12:29:49 | 13:51:10 | 1:52 | 2:42 | 1.0066 |
| Luxembourg | Luxembourg | 11:09:36 | 12:28:28 | 12:29:07 | 12:29:47 | 13:51:19 | 1:19 | 2:42 | 1.0029 |
| Germany | Saarbrücken | 11:10:31 | 12:29:27 | 12:30:32 | 12:31:36 | 13:53:02 | 2:09 | 2:43 | 1.0102 |
| Germany | Kaiserslautern | 11:11:41 | 12:31:22 | 12:31:47 | 12:32:12 | 13:54:08 | 0:50 | 2:42 | 1.0013 |
| Germany | Offenburg | 11:11:22 | 12:31:46 | 12:32:09 | 12:32:32 | 13:55:14 | 0:46 | 2:44 | 1.0011 |
| Germany | Neustadt an der Weinstraße | 11:12:08 | 12:31:48 | 12:32:23 | 12:32:58 | 13:54:49 | 1:10 | 2:43 | 1.0023 |
| Germany | Speyer | 11:12:32 | 12:32:21 | 12:32:53 | 12:33:26 | 13:55:20 | 1:05 | 2:43 | 1.002 |
| Germany | Sindelfingen | 11:12:59 | 12:32:46 | 12:33:54 | 12:35:02 | 13:56:47 | 2:16 | 2:44 | 1.0124 |
| Germany | Stuttgart | 11:13:16 | 12:33:03 | 12:34:12 | 12:35:20 | 13:57:02 | 2:17 | 2:44 | 1.0137 |
| Germany | Munich | 11:16:29 | 12:37:21 | 12:38:26 | 12:39:30 | 14:01:35 | 2:09 | 2:45 | 1.0091 |
| Germany | Freising | 11:16:50 | 12:37:29 | 12:38:38 | 12:39:46 | 14:01:35 | 2:17 | 2:45 | 1.0119 |
| Germany | Rosenheim | 11:17:13 | 12:38:40 | 12:39:28 | 12:40:17 | 14:02:47 | 1:37 | 2:46 | 1.0043 |
| Austria | Salzburg | 11:18:36 | 12:40:03 | 12:41:06 | 12:42:08 | 14:04:20 | 2:05 | 2:46 | 1.0079 |
| Austria | Eferding | 11:20:17 | 12:42:02 | 12:42:35 | 12:43:08 | 14:05:21 | 1:06 | 2:45 | 1.002 |
| Austria | Linz | 11:20:42 | 12:42:50 | 12:43:03 | 12:43:15 | 14:05:46 | 0:25 | 2:45 | 1.0005 |
| Austria | Graz | 11:22:15 | 12:45:06 | 12:45:41 | 12:46:16 | 14:09:04 | 1:10 | 2:47 | 1.0021 |
| Hungary | Szeged | 11:30:11 | 12:53:30 | 12:54:41 | 12:55:52 | 14:17:30 | 2:22 | 2:47 | 1.0125 |
| Romania | Ploiești | 12:41:11 | 14:05:42 | 14:06:24 | 14:07:06 | 15:27:56 | 1:24 | 2:47 | 1.0031 |
| Romania | Bucharest | 12:41:32 | 14:05:55 | 14:07:07 | 14:08:19 | 15:28:51 | 2:24 | 2:47 | 1.0142 |
| Turkey | Diyarbakır | 13:15:39 | 14:39:28 | 14:40:10 | 14:40:51 | 15:56:26 | 1:23 | 2:41 | 1.0034 |
| Iraq | Erbil | 14:25:30 | 15:47:31 | 15:48:27 | 15:49:23 | 17:02:37 | 1:52 | 2:37 | 1.008 |
| Iraq | Sulaymaniyah | 14:29:13 | 15:50:28 | 15:51:27 | 15:52:26 | 17:04:46 | 1:58 | 2:36 | 1.0105 |
| Iran | Isfahan | 15:14:56 | 16:32:50 | 16:33:36 | 16:34:22 | 17:43:14 | 1:32 | 2:28 | 1.0061 |
| Pakistan | Karachi | 16:18:13 | 17:26:01 | 17:26:38 | 17:27:15 | 18:27:30 | 1:14 | 2:09 | 1.0081 |
| India | Vadodara | 16:57:05 | 18:01:11 | 18:01:42 | 18:02:13 | 18:59:36 | 1:02 | 2:03 | 1.0073 |

=== Places experiencing partial eclipse ===
Solar eclipse of August 11, 1999 (local times)
| Country or territory | City or place | Start of partial eclipse | Maximum eclipse | End of partial eclipse | Duration of eclipse (hr:min) | Maximum coverage |
|---|---|---|---|---|---|---|
| Canada | Halifax | 06:11:35 (sunrise) | 06:33:47 | 07:31:21 | 1:20 | 91.77% |
| Canada | St. John's | 06:09:22 | 07:06:10 | 08:07:41 | 1:58 | 91.68% |
| Azerbaijan | Baku | 15:30 | 16:48 | 17:58 | 2:28 | 83.24% |
| Ireland | Dublin | 09:59:49 | 11:12:56 | 12:30:24 | 2:31 | 91.23% |
| United Kingdom | London | 10:03:43 | 11:20:02 | 12:40:10 | 2:36 | 96.58% |
| France | Paris | 11:04:16 | 12:22:59 | 13:45:26 | 2:41 | 99.40% |
| Belgium | Brussels | 11:08:17 | 12:26:27 | 13:47:35 | 2:39 | 97.42% |
| Netherlands | Amsterdam | 11:10:16 | 12:27:29 | 13:47:20 | 2:37 | 91.96% |
| Germany | Frankfurt | 11:13:21 | 12:33:12 | 13:55:02 | 2:42 | 97.97% |
| Switzerland | Zurich | 11:11:41 | 12:33:19 | 13:57:08 | 2:45 | 97.24% |
| Germany | Berlin | 11:21:21 | 12:40:03 | 13:59:24 | 2:38 | 87.17% |
| Czech Republic | Prague | 11:21:33 | 12:42:30 | 14:03:50 | 2:42 | 94.63% |
| Italy | Rome | 11:17:24 | 12:42:48 | 14:09:02 | 2:52 | 80.25% |
| Slovenia | Ljubljana | 11:20:35 | 12:44:32 | 14:08:42 | 2:48 | 96.70% |
| Austria | Vienna | 11:23:58 | 12:46:41 | 14:09:07 | 2:45 | 99.27% |
| Croatia | Zagreb | 11:23:01 | 12:47:23 | 14:11:27 | 2:48 | 97.06% |
| Slovakia | Bratislava | 11:25:09 | 12:47:59 | 14:10:18 | 2:45 | 98.94% |
| Poland | Warsaw | 11:32:24 | 12:51:37 | 14:09:41 | 2:37 | 82.67% |
| Hungary | Budapest | 11:28:17 | 12:51:47 | 14:14:07 | 2:46 | 99.41% |
| Bosnia and Herzegovina | Sarajevo | 11:27:26 | 12:53:22 | 14:17:54 | 2:50 | 92.53% |
| Serbia | Belgrade | 11:30:57 | 12:56:28 | 14:19:59 | 2:49 | 97.73% |
| Bulgaria | Sofia | 12:37:05 | 14:03:58 | 15:27:29 | 2:50 | 93.75% |
| Moldova | Chișinău | 12:45:37 | 14:08:42 | 15:27:54 | 2:42 | 91.47% |
| Turkey | Ankara | 12:58:20 | 14:25:06 | 15:45:09 | 2:47 | 96.72% |
| Armenia | Yerevan | 15:21:01 | 16:42:12 | 17:55:37 | 2:35 | 91.22% |
| Iraq | Baghdad | 14:30:53 | 15:54:02 | 17:07:48 | 2:37 | 94.01% |
| Iran | Tehran | 15:09:44 | 16:28:04 | 17:37:53 | 2:28 | 93.48% |
| Kuwait | Kuwait City | 13:44:26 | 15:05:17 | 16:16:23 | 2:32 | 87.97% |
| United Arab Emirates | Dubai | 15:03:45 | 16:19:15 | 17:25:35 | 2:22 | 87.05% |
| India | New Delhi | 16:51:14 | 17:53:39 | 18:50:09 | 1:59 | 78.90% |
| Bangladesh | Dhaka | 17:32:22 | 18:28:38 | 18:34:59 (sunset) | 1:03 | 79.92% |

== Gallery ==
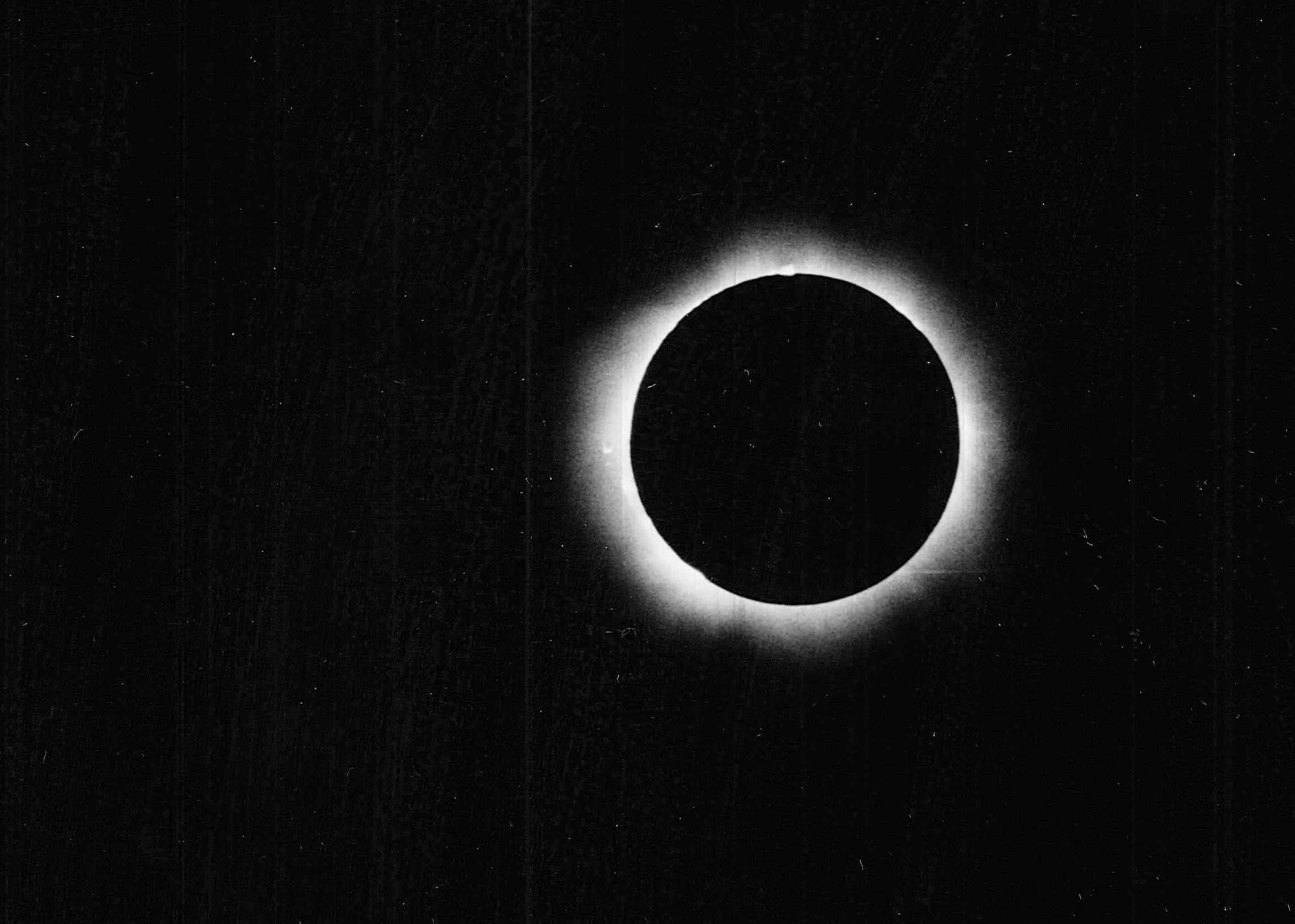
Salzburg, Austria

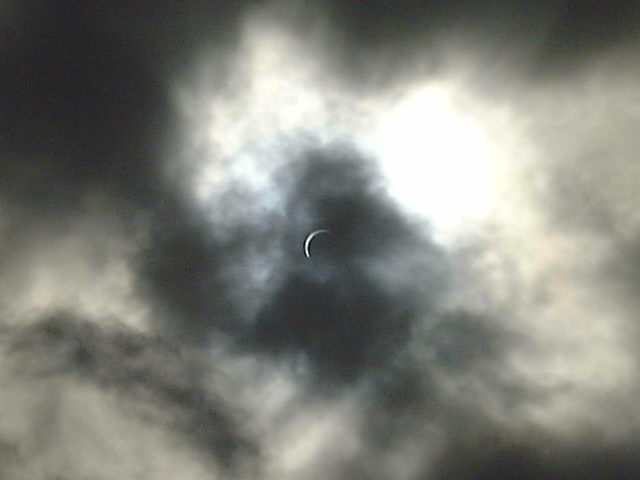
Partial from Paderborn, Germany

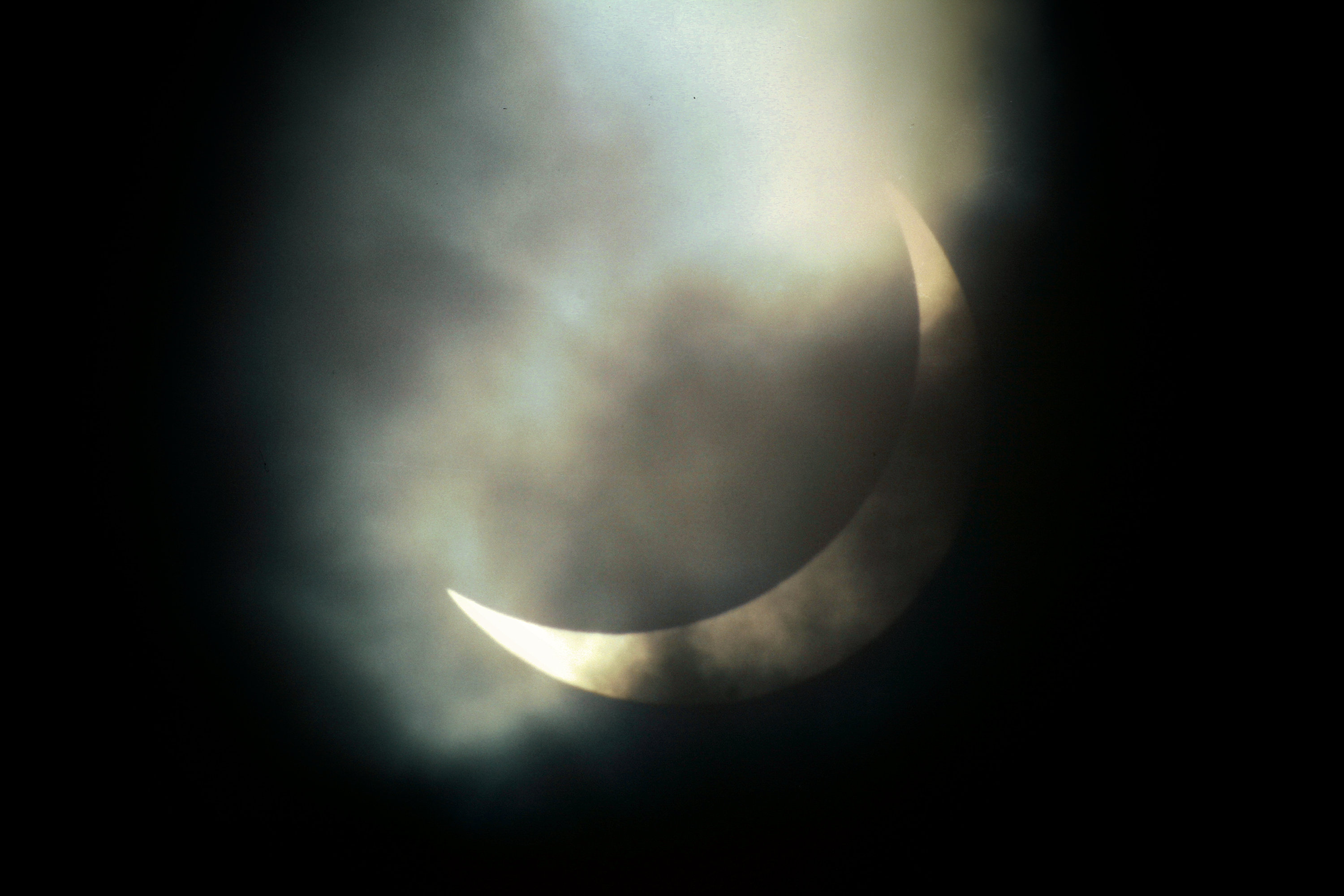
Partial from Oria, Italy

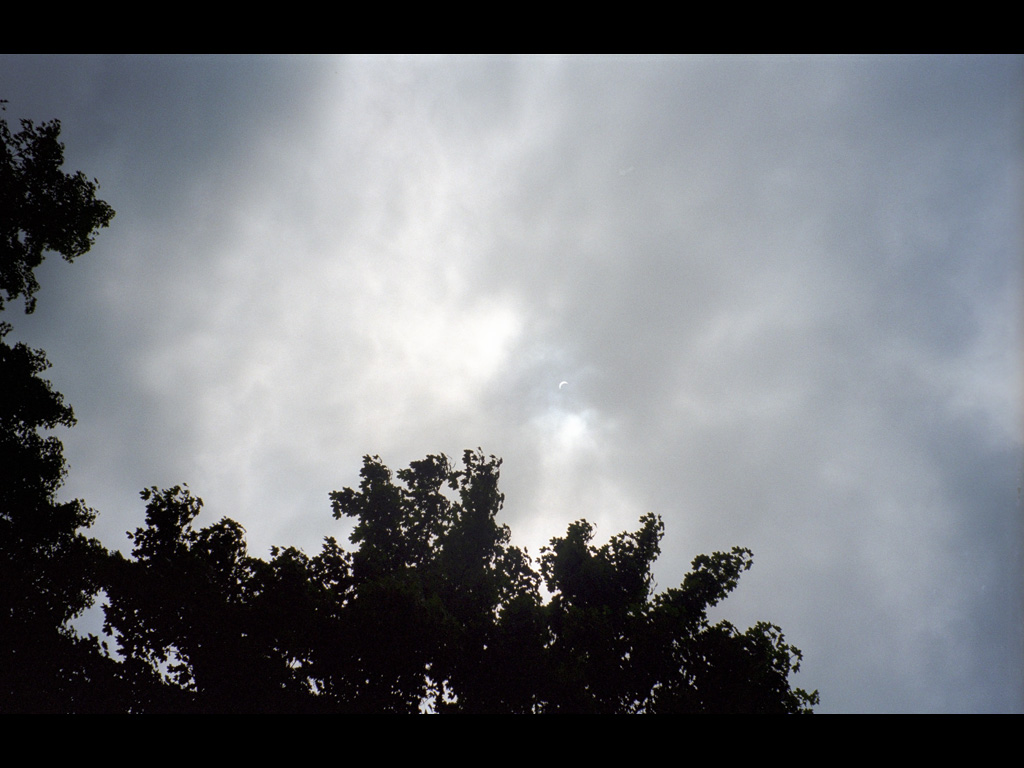
Partial from Haarlem, the Netherlands

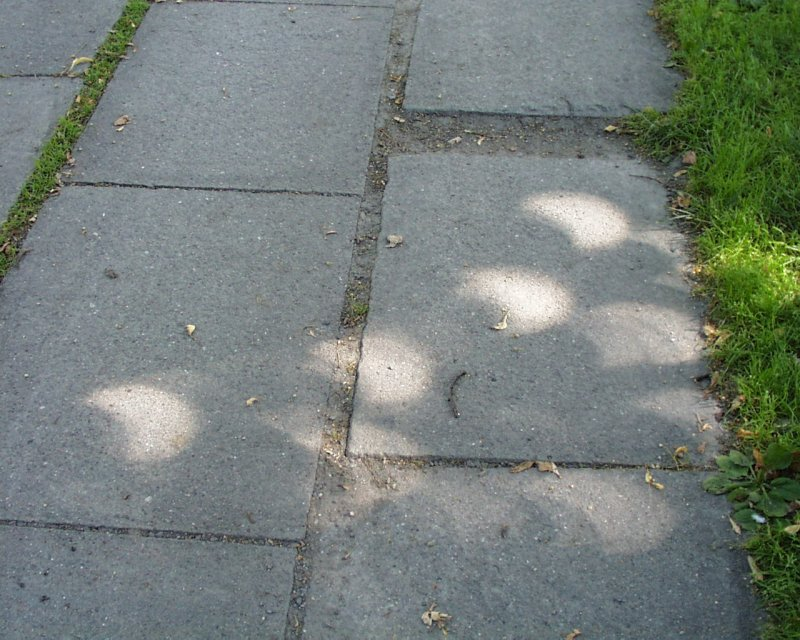
Projection in Oslo, Norway

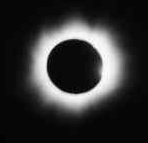
Lake Balaton, Hungary

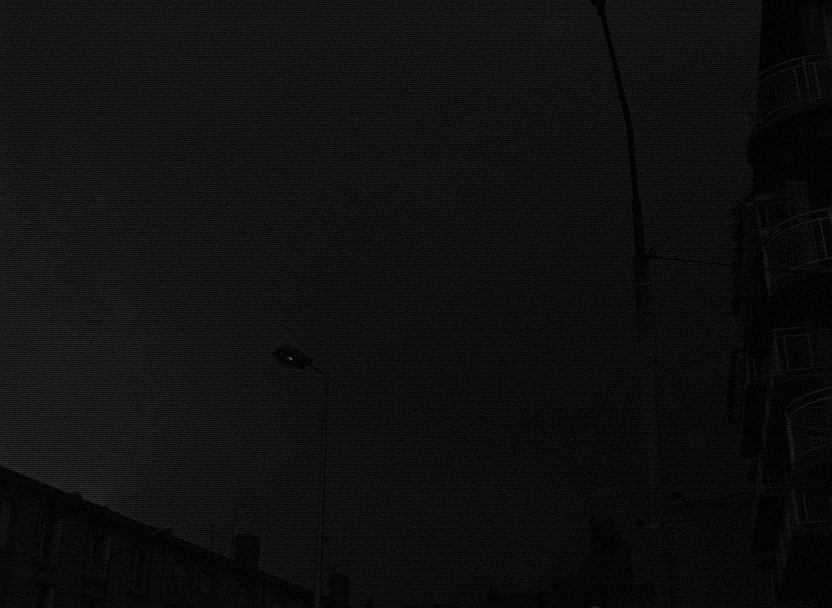
Laon, France

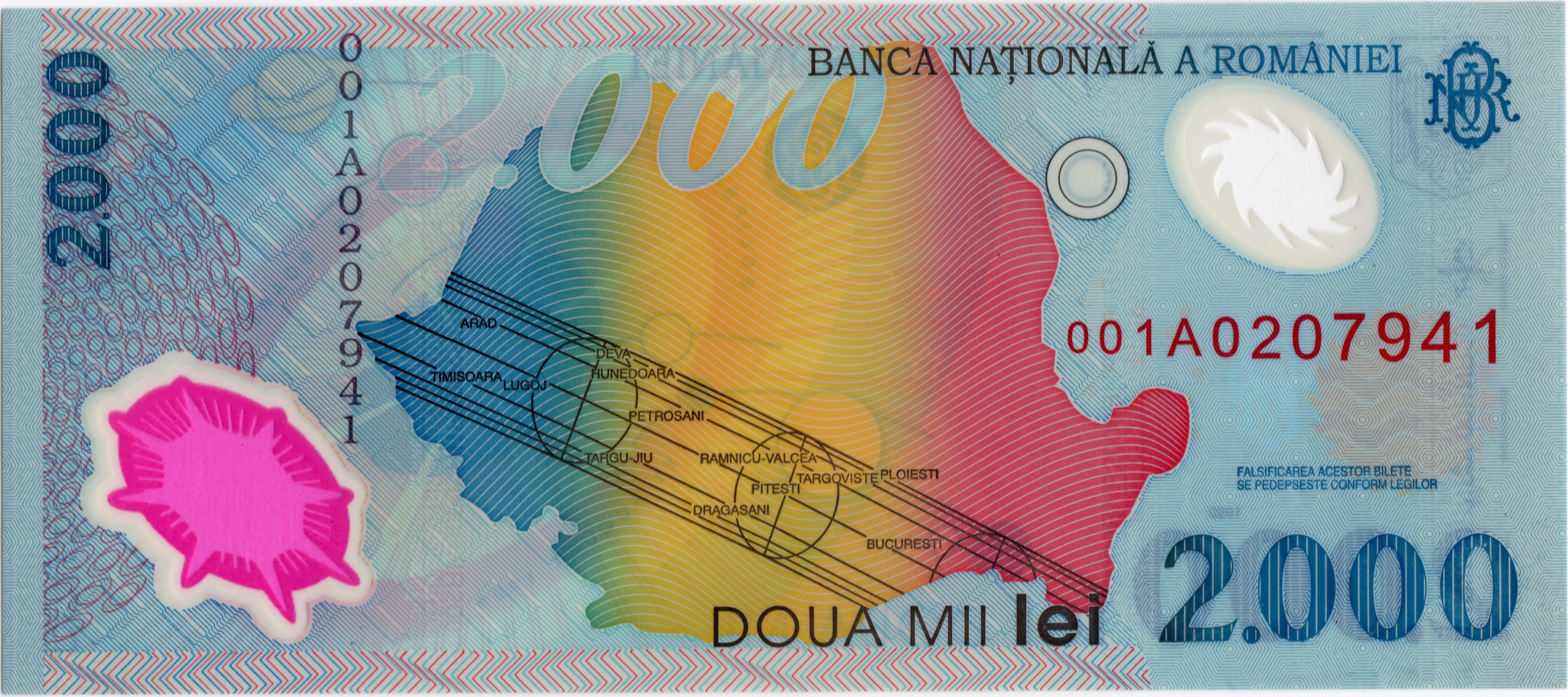
Special 2,000 lei note made for the 1999 eclipse, showing the eclipse path over the map of Romania

== Eclipse details ==
Shown below are two tables displaying details about this particular solar eclipse. The first table outlines times at which the Moon's penumbra or umbra attains the specific parameter, and the second table describes various other parameters pertaining to this eclipse.

August 11, 1999 Solar Eclipse Times
| Event | Time (UTC) |
|---|---|
| First Penumbral External Contact | 1999 August 11 at 08:27:19.0 UTC |
| First Umbral External Contact | 1999 August 11 at 09:30:56.5 UTC |
| First Central Line | 1999 August 11 at 09:31:25.4 UTC |
| First Umbral Internal Contact | 1999 August 11 at 09:31:54.4 UTC |
| Equatorial Conjunction | 1999 August 11 at 10:52:16.8 UTC |
| Greatest Duration | 1999 August 11 at 11:00:37.9 UTC |
| Greatest Eclipse | 1999 August 11 at 11:04:09.1 UTC |
| Ecliptic Conjunction | 1999 August 11 at 11:09:33.8 UTC |
| Last Umbral Internal Contact | 1999 August 11 at 12:36:35.5 UTC |
| Last Central Line | 1999 August 11 at 12:37:01.7 UTC |
| Last Umbral External Contact | 1999 August 11 at 12:37:27.9 UTC |
| Last Penumbral External Contact | 1999 August 11 at 13:41:10.3 UTC |

August 11, 1999 Solar Eclipse Parameters
| Parameter | Value |
|---|---|
| Eclipse Magnitude | 1.02860 |
| Eclipse Obscuration | 1.05802 |
| Gamma | 0.50623 |
| Sun Right Ascension | 09h23m08.3s |
| Sun Declination | +15°19'39.7" |
| Sun Semi-Diameter | 15'46.8" |
| Sun Equatorial Horizontal Parallax | 08.7" |
| Moon Right Ascension | 09h23m34.5s |
| Moon Declination | +15°48'38.5" |
| Moon Semi-Diameter | 16'00.3" |
| Moon Equatorial Horizontal Parallax | 0°58'44.3" |
| ΔT | 63.7 s |

== Eclipse season ==
This eclipse is part of an eclipse season, a period, roughly every six months, when eclipses occur. Only two (or occasionally three) eclipse seasons occur each year, and each season lasts about 35 days and repeats just short of six months (173 days) later; thus two full eclipse seasons always occur each year. Either two or three eclipses happen each eclipse season. In the sequence below, each eclipse is separated by a fortnight.

Eclipse season of July–August 1999
| July 28 Descending node (full moon) | August 11 Ascending node (new moon) |
|---|---|
| Partial lunar eclipse Lunar Saros 119 | Total solar eclipse Solar Saros 145 |

== Related eclipses ==
=== Eclipses in 1999 ===
- A penumbral lunar eclipse on January 31.
- An annular solar eclipse on February 16.
- A partial lunar eclipse on July 28.
- A total solar eclipse on August 11.

=== Metonic ===
- Preceded by: Solar eclipse of October 24, 1995
- Followed by: Solar eclipse of May 31, 2003

=== Tzolkinex ===
- Preceded by: Solar eclipse of June 30, 1992
- Followed by: Solar eclipse of September 22, 2006

=== Half-Saros ===
- Preceded by: Lunar eclipse of August 6, 1990
- Followed by: Lunar eclipse of August 16, 2008

=== Tritos ===
- Preceded by: Solar eclipse of September 11, 1988
- Followed by: Solar eclipse of July 11, 2010

=== Solar Saros 145 ===
- Preceded by: Solar eclipse of July 31, 1981
- Followed by: Solar eclipse of August 21, 2017

=== Inex ===
- Preceded by: Solar eclipse of August 31, 1970
- Followed by: Solar eclipse of July 22, 2028

=== Triad ===
- Preceded by: Solar eclipse of October 10, 1912
- Followed by: Solar eclipse of June 11, 2086

=== Solar eclipses of 1997–2000 ===
This eclipse is a member of a semester series. An eclipse in a semester series of solar eclipses repeats approximately every 177 days and 4 hours (a semester) at alternating nodes of the Moon's orbit.

The partial solar eclipses on July 1, 2000 and December 25, 2000 occur in the next lunar year eclipse set.

Solar eclipse series sets from 1997 to 2000
| Descending node | | | Ascending node | | |
| Saros | Map | Gamma | Saros | Map | Gamma |
| 120 Totality in Chita, Russia | March 9, 1997 Total | 0.9183 | 125 | September 2, 1997 Partial | −1.0352 |
| 130 Totality near Guadeloupe | February 26, 1998 Total | 0.2391 | 135 | August 22, 1998 Annular | −0.2644 |
| 140 | February 16, 1999 Annular | −0.4726 | 145 Totality in France | August 11, 1999 Total | 0.5062 |
| 150 | February 5, 2000 Partial | −1.2233 | 155 | July 31, 2000 Partial | 1.2166 |

=== Saros 145 ===
This eclipse is a part of Saros series 145, repeating every 18 years, 11 days, and containing 77 events. The series started with a partial solar eclipse on January 4, 1639. It contains an annular eclipse on June 6, 1891; a hybrid eclipse on June 17, 1909; and total eclipses from June 29, 1927 through September 9, 2648. The series ends at member 77 as a partial eclipse on April 17, 3009. Its eclipses are tabulated in three columns; every third eclipse in the same column is one exeligmos apart, so they all cast shadows over approximately the same parts of the Earth.

The longest duration of annularity was produced by member 15 at 6 seconds (by default) on June 6, 1891, and the longest duration of totality will be produced by member 50 at 7 minutes, 12 seconds on June 25, 2522. All eclipses in this series occur at the Moon’s ascending node of orbit.

Series members 10–32 occur between 1801 and 2200:
| 10 | 11 | 12 |
|---|---|---|
| April 13, 1801 | April 24, 1819 | May 4, 1837 |
| 13 | 14 | 15 |
| May 16, 1855 | May 26, 1873 | June 6, 1891 |
| 16 | 17 | 18 |
| June 17, 1909 | June 29, 1927 | July 9, 1945 |
| 19 | 20 | 21 |
| July 20, 1963 | July 31, 1981 | August 11, 1999 |
| 22 | 23 | 24 |
| August 21, 2017 | September 2, 2035 | September 12, 2053 |
| 25 | 26 | 27 |
| September 23, 2071 | October 4, 2089 | October 16, 2107 |
| 28 | 29 | 30 |
| October 26, 2125 | November 7, 2143 | November 17, 2161 |
| 31 | 32 | |
| November 28, 2179 | December 9, 2197 | |

=== Metonic series ===
The metonic series repeats eclipses every 19 years (6939.69 days), lasting about 5 cycles. Eclipses occur in nearly the same calendar date. In addition, the octon subseries repeats 1/5 of that or every 3.8 years (1387.94 days). All eclipses in this table occur at the Moon's ascending node.

22 eclipse events between January 5, 1935 and August 11, 2018
| January 4–5 | October 23–24 | August 10–12 | May 30–31 | March 18–19 |
| 111 | 113 | 115 | 117 | 119 |
|---|---|---|---|---|
| January 5, 1935 | | August 12, 1942 | May 30, 1946 | March 18, 1950 |
| 121 | 123 | 125 | 127 | 129 |
| January 5, 1954 | October 23, 1957 | August 11, 1961 | May 30, 1965 | March 18, 1969 |
| 131 | 133 | 135 | 137 | 139 |
| January 4, 1973 | October 23, 1976 | August 10, 1980 | May 30, 1984 | March 18, 1988 |
| 141 | 143 | 145 | 147 | 149 |
| January 4, 1992 | October 24, 1995 | August 11, 1999 | May 31, 2003 | March 19, 2007 |
| 151 | 153 | 155 | | |
| January 4, 2011 | October 23, 2014 | August 11, 2018 | | |

=== Tritos series ===
This eclipse is a part of a tritos cycle, repeating at alternating nodes every 135 synodic months (≈ 3986.63 days, or 11 years minus 1 month). Their appearance and longitude are irregular due to a lack of synchronization with the anomalistic month (period of perigee), but groupings of 3 tritos cycles (≈ 33 years minus 3 months) come close (≈ 434.044 anomalistic months), so eclipses are similar in these groupings.

Series members between 1801 and 2200
| February 21, 1803 (Saros 127) | January 21, 1814 (Saros 128) | December 20, 1824 (Saros 129) | November 20, 1835 (Saros 130) | October 20, 1846 (Saros 131) |
| September 18, 1857 (Saros 132) | August 18, 1868 (Saros 133) | July 19, 1879 (Saros 134) | June 17, 1890 (Saros 135) | May 18, 1901 (Saros 136) |
| April 17, 1912 (Saros 137) | March 17, 1923 (Saros 138) | February 14, 1934 (Saros 139) | January 14, 1945 (Saros 140) | December 14, 1955 (Saros 141) |
| November 12, 1966 (Saros 142) | October 12, 1977 (Saros 143) | September 11, 1988 (Saros 144) | August 11, 1999 (Saros 145) | July 11, 2010 (Saros 146) |
| June 10, 2021 (Saros 147) | May 9, 2032 (Saros 148) | April 9, 2043 (Saros 149) | March 9, 2054 (Saros 150) | February 5, 2065 (Saros 151) |
| January 6, 2076 (Saros 152) | December 6, 2086 (Saros 153) | November 4, 2097 (Saros 154) | October 5, 2108 (Saros 155) | September 5, 2119 (Saros 156) |
| August 4, 2130 (Saros 157) | July 3, 2141 (Saros 158) | June 3, 2152 (Saros 159) | | April 1, 2174 (Saros 161) |

=== Inex series ===
This eclipse is a part of the long period inex cycle, repeating at alternating nodes, every 358 synodic months (≈ 10,571.95 days, or 29 years minus 20 days). Their appearance and longitude are irregular due to a lack of synchronization with the anomalistic month (period of perigee). However, groupings of 3 inex cycles (≈ 87 years minus 2 months) comes close (≈ 1,151.02 anomalistic months), so eclipses are similar in these groupings.

Series members between 1801 and 2200
| December 9, 1825 (Saros 139) | November 20, 1854 (Saros 140) | October 30, 1883 (Saros 141) |
| October 10, 1912 (Saros 142) | September 21, 1941 (Saros 143) | August 31, 1970 (Saros 144) |
| August 11, 1999 (Saros 145) | July 22, 2028 (Saros 146) | July 1, 2057 (Saros 147) |
| June 11, 2086 (Saros 148) | May 24, 2115 (Saros 149) | May 3, 2144 (Saros 150) |
| April 12, 2173 (Saros 151) | | |

== Popular culture ==
- Sleeping Sun (1999), by the Finnish band Nightwish
- Les Terriens (2000), French documentary directed by Ariane Doublet
- Les Ensoleillés (2002), compilation of around twenty short stories based on the 1999 eclipse, written by Joël Egloff
- Castlevania: Aria of Sorrow (2003), a Game Boy Advance game developed and published by Konami, whose narrative backstory depicts the sealing of Dracula's castle inside a similar solar eclipse during a climactic war in 1999, partially inspired by this event.
- Pomračenje sunca (1999), a folk song explicitly about the solar eclipse by Baja Mali Knindža
- Grazie Mille (1999) by the Italian band 883, the video of the song was filmed in Munich during the eclipse.

== See also ==
- List of solar eclipses visible from the United Kingdom
- Solar eclipse of March 29, 2006
- Solar eclipse of August 12, 2026
- Solar eclipse of September 3, 2081
