= Two thousand lei =

- Country: Romania
- Value: 2,000 Romanian leu
- Width: 142 mm
- Height: 62 mm
- Security features: Transparent window, printed thread, shadow image (BNR), window filter, transmission hologram
- Material used: Polymer (plastic)
- Years of printing: 1999

Obverse
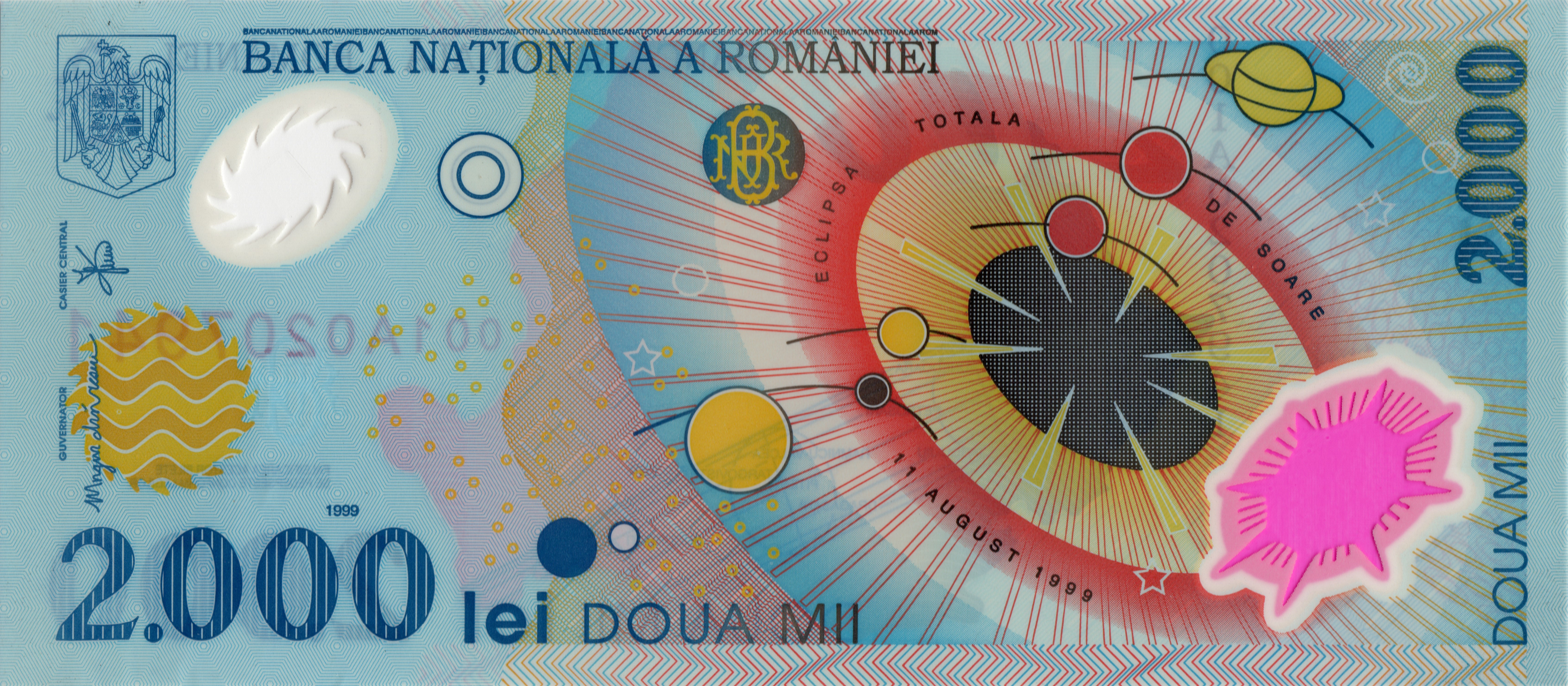
- Design: Solar System
- Designer: Nicolae Săftoiu
- Design date: 1999

Reverse
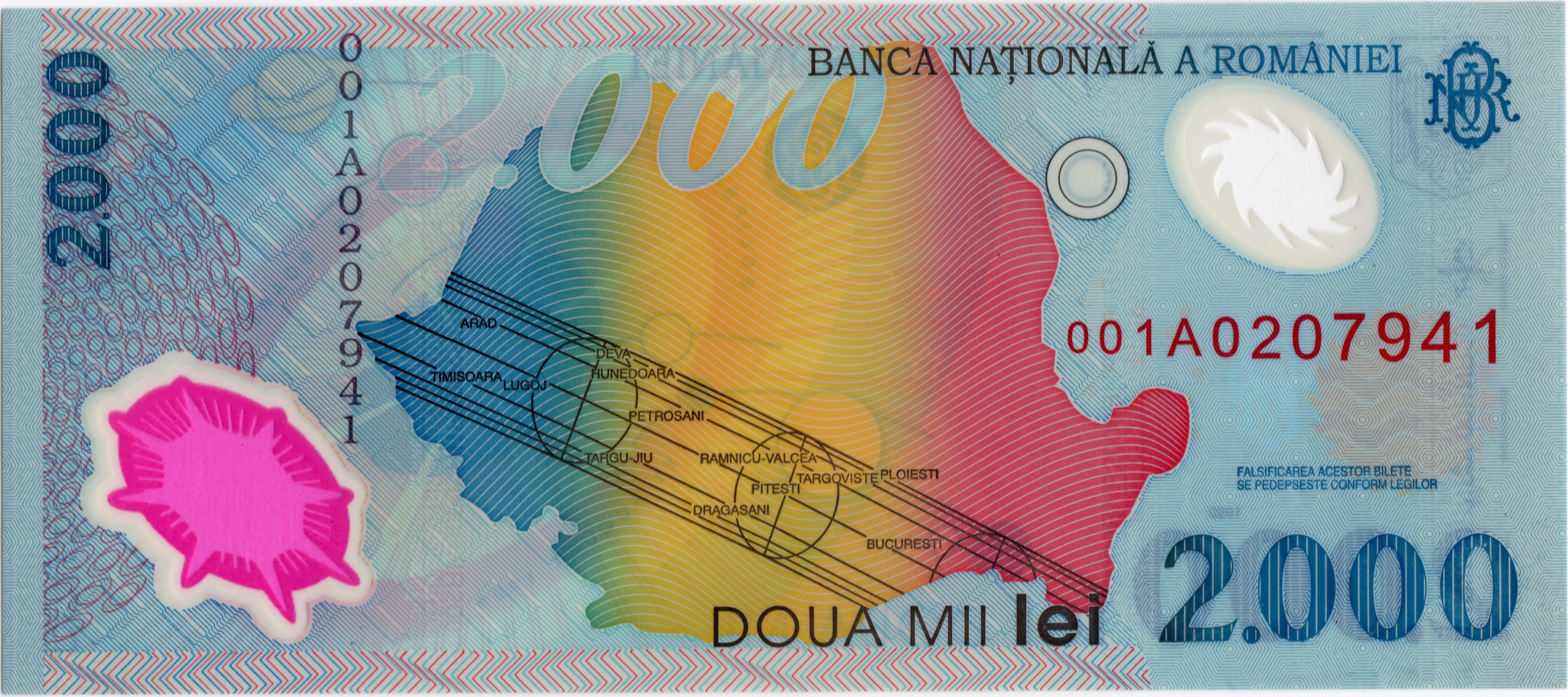
- Design: 1999 solar eclipse over Romania
- Designer: Nicolae Săftoiu
- Design date: 1999

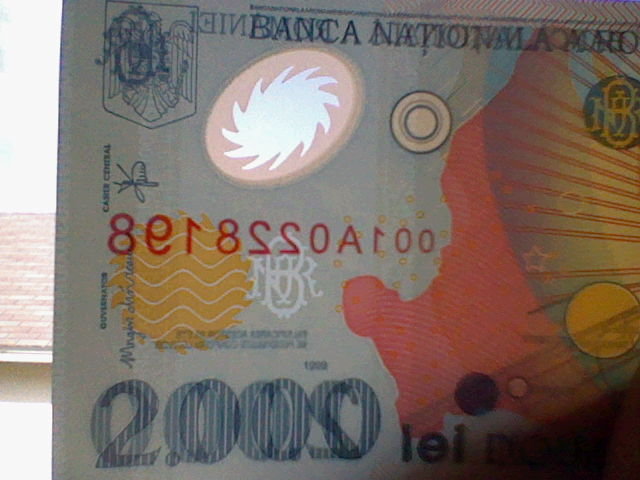
Security features, including the thread, transparent window, and shadow image

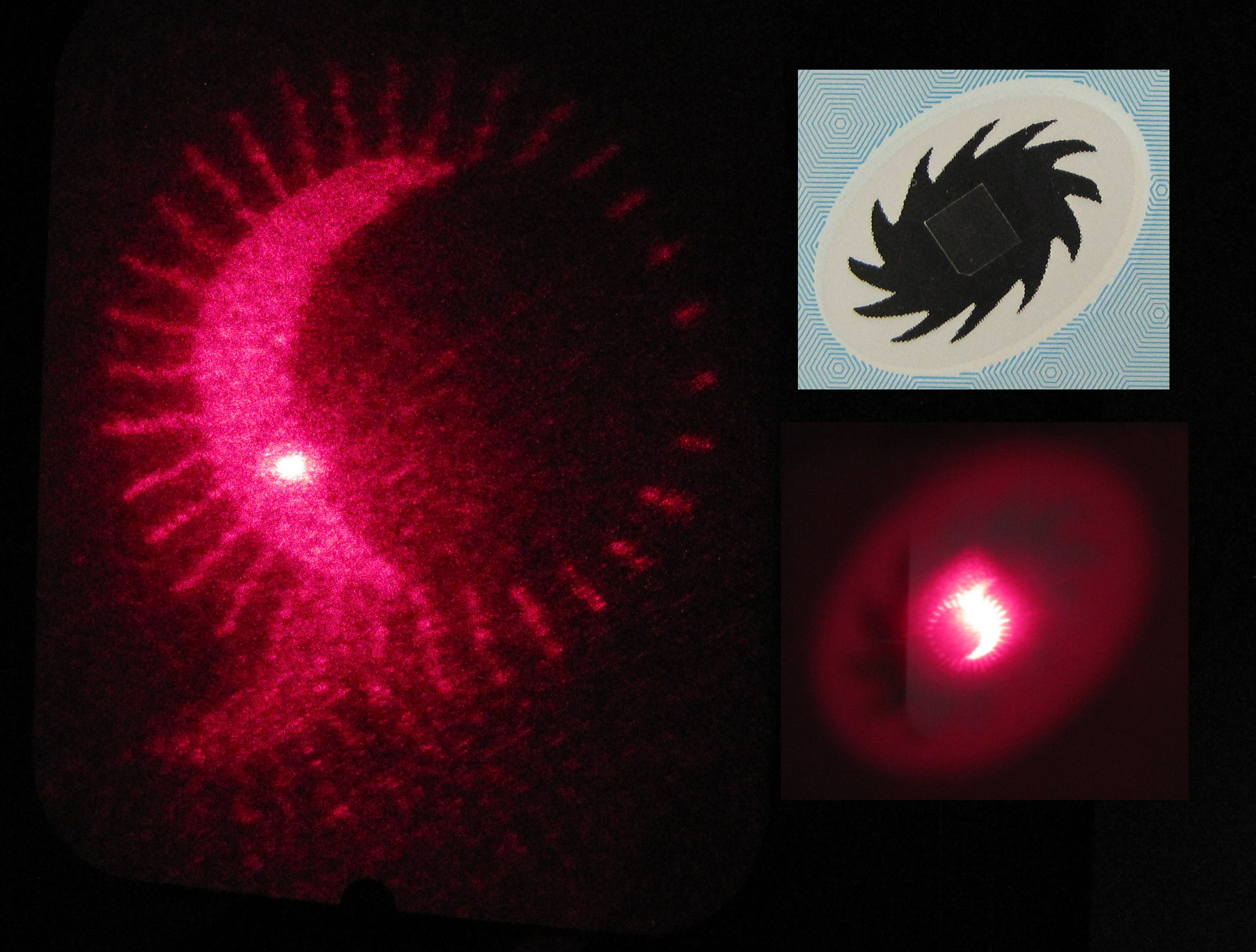
Images of the transmission hologram. Shown clockwise from upper right: the hologram (the square), view through the hologram while looking at a single-color point light source in the distance, and projection of the hologram to the far-field by shining a laser through it.

In celebration of the total solar eclipse of August 11, 1999, the National Bank of Romania (BNR) decided to issue a commemorative two thousand Romanian lei banknote. This was the last solar eclipse of the millennium and was visible across southern Romania. Since it was the last eclipse of the millennium, the denomination was chosen to be 2000 in respect to the upcoming year. These notes were issued as legal tender.

== Design ==
The banknote was designed by the Romanian artist Nicolae Săftoiu, who is credited with all Romanian banknote designs from the 1989 Revolution until his death in 2017. In observance of the coming millennium, the obverse of the note displays a rendering of the Solar System viewed from afar, showing all of the planets revolving around the Sun.

The reverse of the note displays a map outline of Romania with the colors schemed to match the colors of the Romanian flag. The map marks the main points where the solar eclipse was visible in a path moving along the map from west to east.

The notes were printed using offset printing, a commonly used printing technique where the inked image is transferred (or "offset") from a plate to a rubber blanket, then finally onto the printing surface.

=== Main security features ===
Security features include:

- Transparent window - special in specifically polymer notes. It is an open, clear and plastic window in the note which is hard to counterfeit.
- Shadow image - includes the BNR logo. This image can be seen when the banknote is held to the light (a chemical is used to opacify the polymer for the design).
- See-through registration - optical see-through image on each side of the note to make sure it was not printed using a counterfeit, in which case it would not match and align
- Printed thread - a black thread that can be seen when the note is held up to the light.
- Transmission hologram - The transparent window includes a transmission hologram depicting the Moon eclipsing the Sun.

== Commemorative folder ==
In order to generate interest with currency collectors, the BNR also issued special commemorative folders with the banknotes. These were limited to 1 million pieces and each one contained a special, low-numbered banknote with the series001A.

== History ==
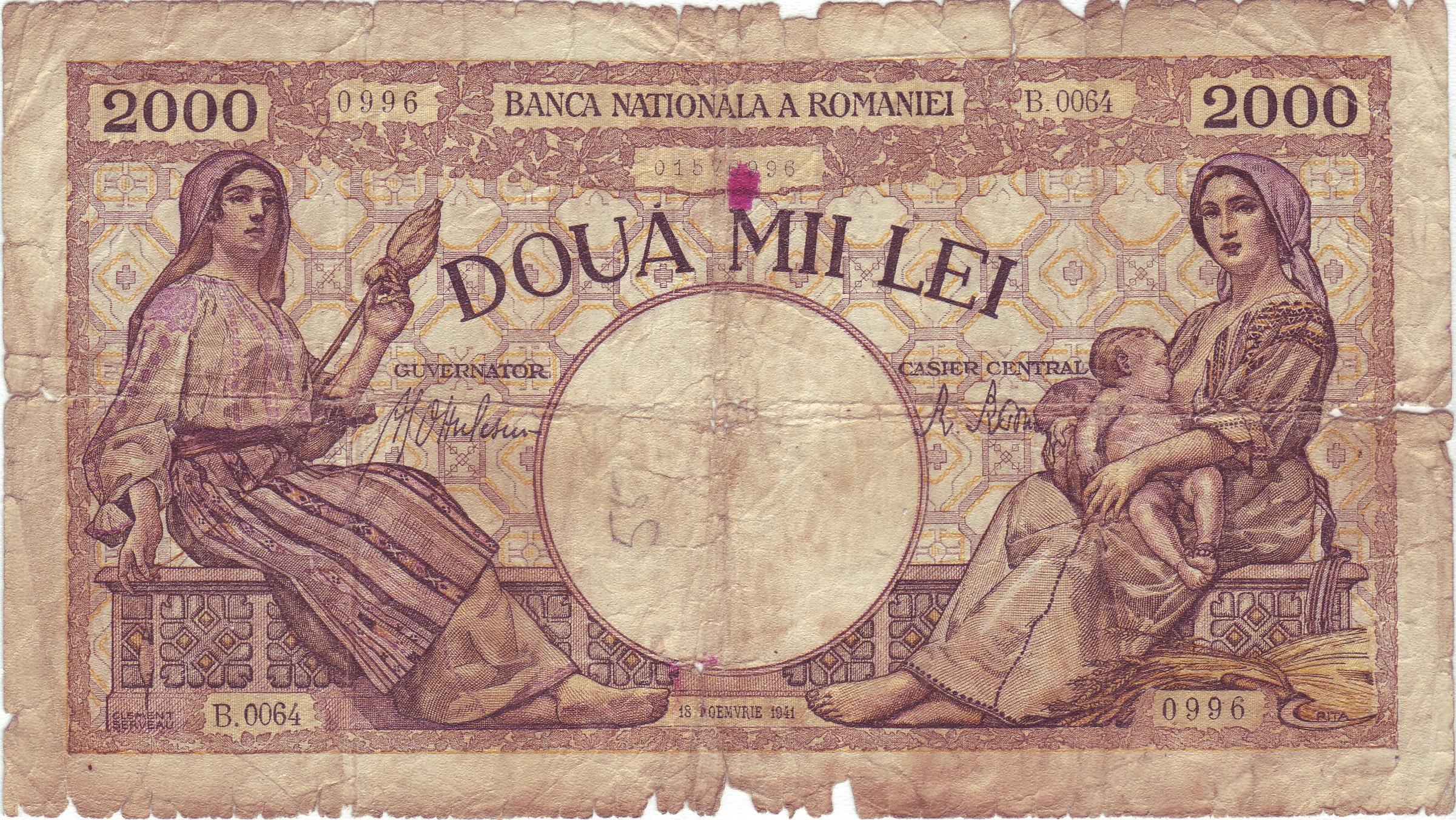
Obverse

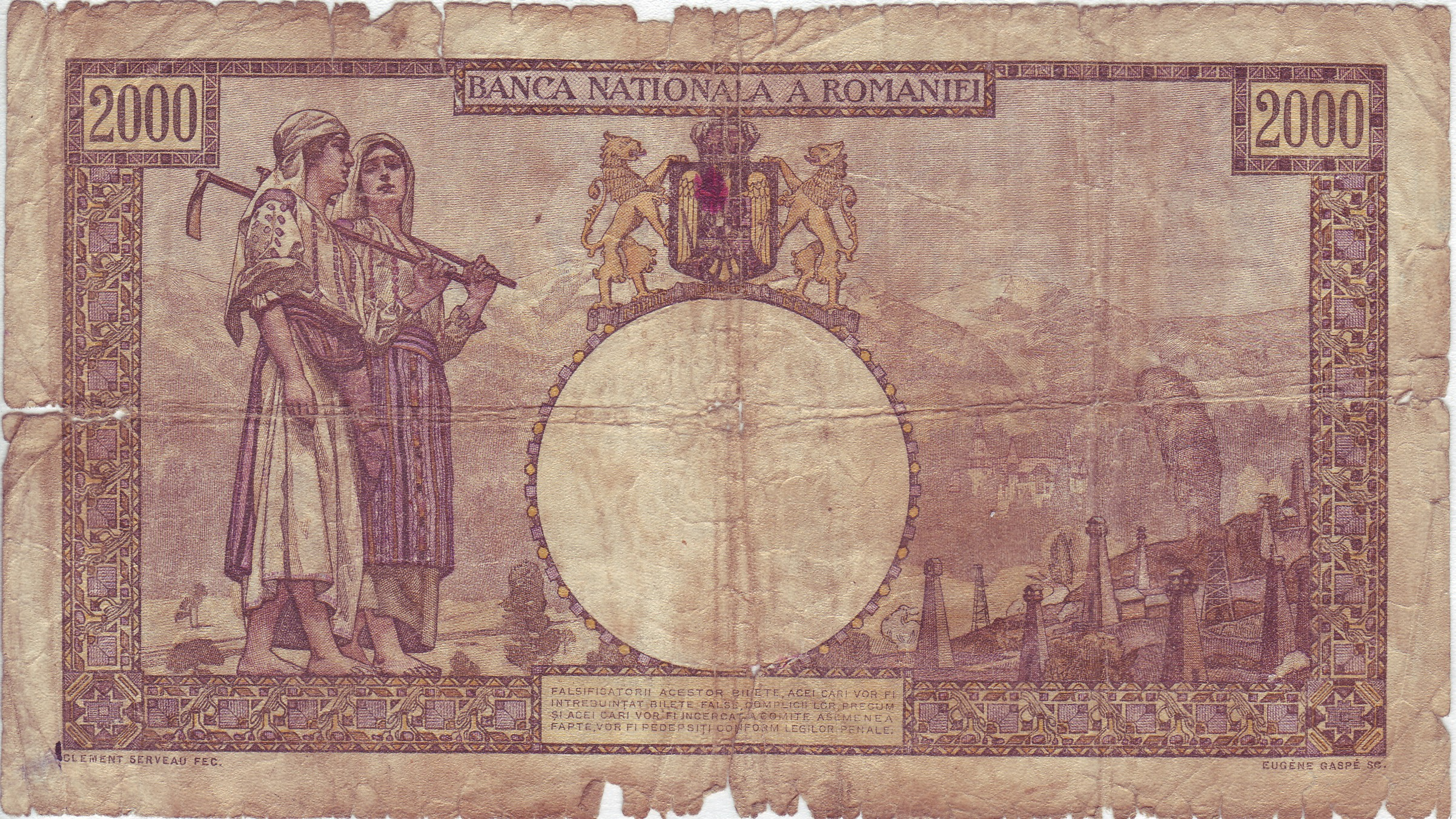
Reverse

1941 2000 lei issue

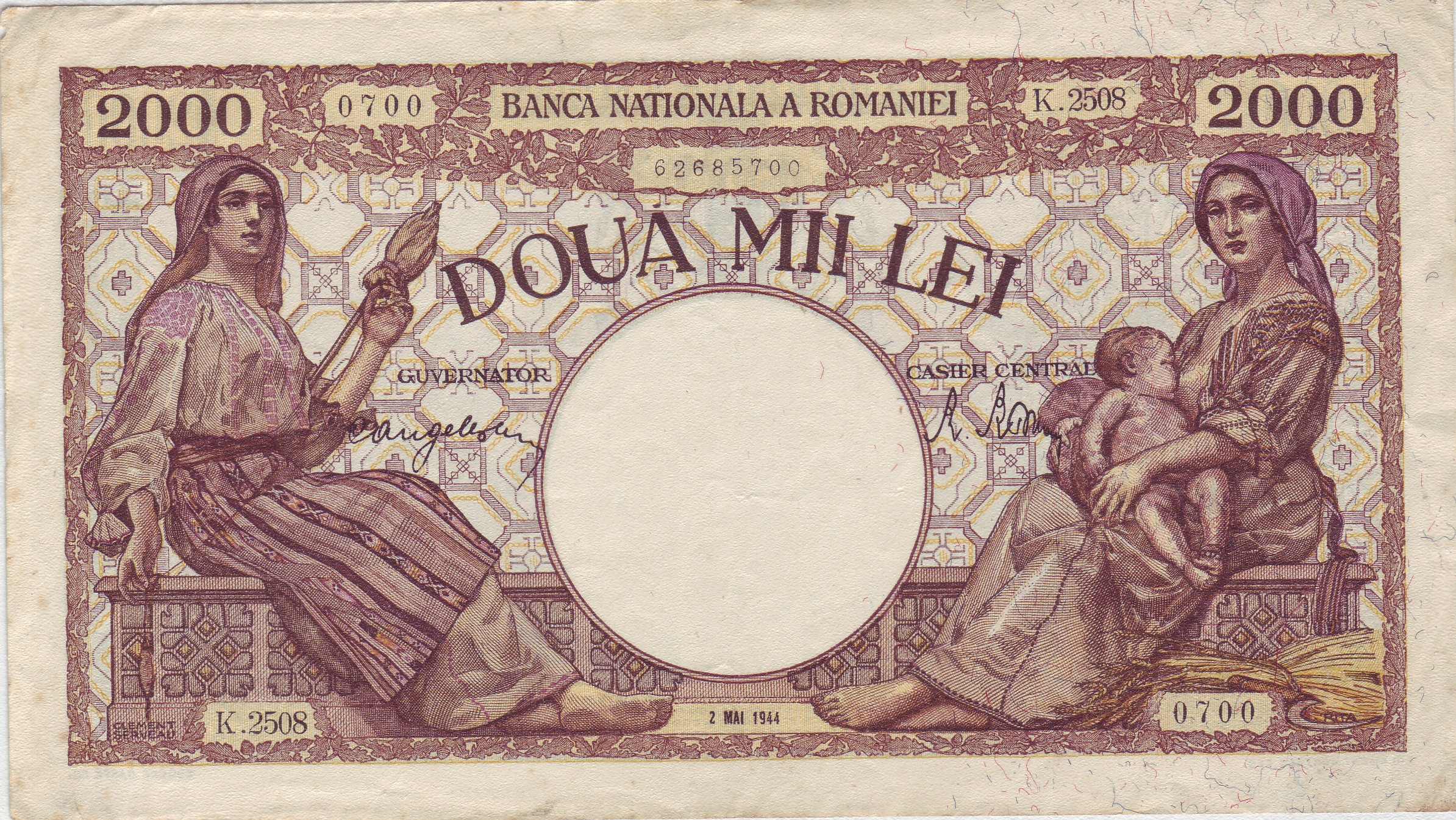
Obverse

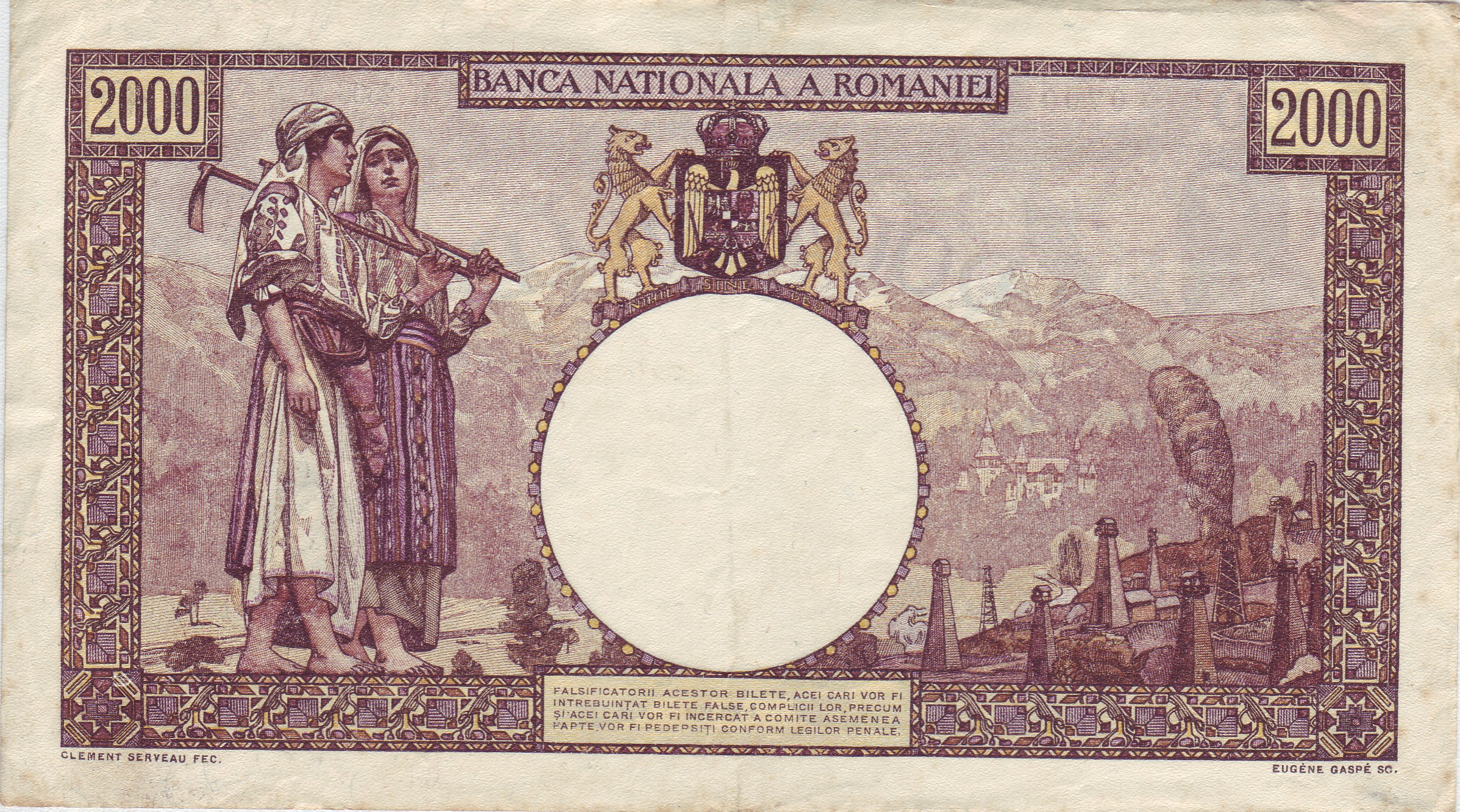
Reverse

1943–1945 2000 lei issue
