= Coins of the Romanian leu =

The Coins of the Romanian leu have been issued since the introduction of the Romanian leu in 1867.

== First leu ==
In 1867, copper 1, 2, 5 and 10 bani were issued, with gold 20 lei (known as poli after the French Napoleons) first minted the next year. These were followed, between 1870 and 1873, by silver 50 bani, 1 and 2 lei. Silver 5 lei were added in 1880. Uniquely, the 1867 issue used the spelling 1 banu rather than 1 ban.

In 1900, cupro-nickel 5, 10 and 20 bani coins were introduced, with holed versions following in 1905. The production of coins ceased in 1914, recommencing in 1921 with aluminium 25 and 50 bani pieces. Cupro-nickel 1 and 2 lei coins were introduced in 1924, followed by nickel brass 5, 10 and 20 lei in 1930. In 1932, silver 100 lei coins were issued. However, inflation meant that, in 1935, smaller silver 250 lei coins were introduced with nickel 100 lei coins being issued in 1936, followed by nickel 50 lei in 1937.

In 1941 and 1942, zinc 2, 5 and 20 lei coins were introduced, together with silver 200 and 500 lei. Nickel-clad-steel 100 lei followed in 1943, with brass 200 and 500 lei issued in 1945. In 1946 and 1947, a new coinage was issued consisting of aluminium 500 lei, brass 2000 and 10,000 lei, and silver 25,000 and 100,000 lei.

=== King Carol I ===
==== 1867-1873 Series ====
| Image | Value | Technical parameters | | | Description | | | Date of | | |
| Image | Value | Diameter | Mass | Composition | Edge | Obverse | Reverse | first minting | withdrawal | lapse |
|---|---|---|---|---|---|---|---|---|---|---|
| | 1 banu | 15 mm | 1 g | copper | Smooth | Value, wreath, year of minting | coat of arms | 1867 | 19 December 1931 | |
| | 2 bani | 20 mm | 2 g | copper | Smooth | Value, wreath, year of minting | coat of arms | 1867 | 19 December 1931 | |
| | 5 bani | 25 mm | 3.5 g | copper | Smooth | Value, wreath, year of minting | coat of arms | 1867 | 19 December 1931 | |
| | 10 bani | 30 mm | 4.5 g | copper | Smooth | Value, wreath, year of minting | coat of arms | 1867 | 19 December 1931 | |
| | 50 bani | 18 mm | 2.5 g | silver | Reeded | Crown above date within wreath | Value above sprays | 1873 | 19 December 1931 | |
| | 1 leu | 23 mm | 5 g | silver | Reeded | Value, wreath, year of minting | CAROL I DOMNUL ROMANIEI ("Carol I, Lord of Romania") | 1870 | 19 December 1931 | |
| | 2 lei | 27 mm | 10 g | silver | Reeded | Value, wreath, ROMANIA | coat of arms, year of minting | 1872 | 19 December 1931 | |

==== 1880s Series ====
First Leu Coins – 1880s Series
| Image | Value | Technical parameters | | | Description | | | Date of | | |
| Image | Value | Diameter | Mass | Composition | Edge | Obverse | Reverse | first minting | withdrawal | lapse |
|---|---|---|---|---|---|---|---|---|---|---|
| | 2 bani | 20 mm | 2 g | copper | Smooth | Value, year of minting, ROMANIA, coat of arms | CAROL I DOMNUL ROMANIEI ("Carol I, Lord of Romania") | 1880 | 19 December 1931 | |
| | 5 bani | 25 mm | 3.5 g | copper | Smooth | Value, year of minting, ROMANIA, coat of arms | CAROL I REGE AL ROMANIEI ("Carol I, King of Romania") | 1882 | 19 December 1931 | |
| | 50 bani | 25 mm | 2.5 g | silver 83.5% | Milled | Value, year of minting | CAROL I REGE AL ROMANIEI ("Carol I, King of Romania") | 1884 | 19 December 1931 | |

==== 1900 Series ====
First Leu Coins – 1900 Series
| Image | Value | Technical parameters | | | Description | | | Date of | | |
| Image | Value | Diameter | Mass | Composition | Edge | Obverse | Reverse | first minting | withdrawal | lapse |
|---|---|---|---|---|---|---|---|---|---|---|
| | 1 ban | 15 mm | 1 g | copper 95%, tin 4%, zinc 1% | Smooth | Value, year of minting, ROMANIA, coat of arms | CAROL I REGE AL ROMANIEI ("Carol I, King of Romania") | 1900 | 19 December 1931 | |
| | 2 bani | 20 mm | 2 g | copper 95%, tin 4%, zinc 1% | Smooth | Value, year of minting, ROMANIA, coat of arms | CAROL I REGE AL ROMANIEI ("Carol I, King of Romania") | 1900 | 19 December 1931 | |
| | 5 bani | 19 mm | 3.5 g | copper 75%, nickel 25% | Smooth | ROMANIA, value | Steel crown, wreath, year of minting | 1900 | 19 December 1931 | |
| | 10 bani | 22 mm | 4.5 g | copper 75%, nickel 25% | Smooth | ROMANIA, value | Steel crown, wreath, year of minting | 1900 | 19 December 1931 | |
| | 20 bani | 25 mm | 7 g | copper 75%, nickel 25% | Smooth | ROMANIA, value | Steel crown, wreath, year of minting | 1900 | 19 December 1931 | |
These images are to scale at 2.5 pixels per millimetre. For table standards, see the coin specification table.

==== 1905 Series ====
Five, ten and twenty-bani coins are holed.

| Image | Value | Technical parameters | | | Description | | | Date of | | |
| Image | Value | Diameter | Mass | Composition | Edge | Obverse | Reverse | first minting | withdrawal | lapse |
|---|---|---|---|---|---|---|---|---|---|---|
| | 5 bani | 19 mm | 2.5 g | Copper 75%, Nickel 25% | Smooth | Value, year of minting, two roses | Royal Crown, state title on a ribbon | 1905 | 19 December 1931 | |
| | 10 bani | 22 mm | 4 g | Copper 75%, Nickel 25% | Smooth | Value, year of minting, two roses | Royal Crown, state title on a ribbon | 1905 | 19 December 1931 | |
| | 20 bani | 25 mm | 7 g | Copper 75%, Nickel 25% | Smooth | Value, year of minting, two roses | Royal Crown, state title on a ribbon | 1905 | 19 December 1931 | |
| | 1 leu | 23 mm | 5 g | Silver 83.5%, Copper 16.5% | Milled | Value, "CAROL I DOMNUL ROMANIEI" ("Carol I Prince of Romania"), the effigy of Prince Carol I | "1866 - 1906", "CAROL I REGE AL ROMANIEI" ("Carol I King of Romania"), the effigy of the King | 1881 | 19 December 1931 | |
| | 5 lei | 38 mm | 25 g | Silver 90%, Copper 10% | Milled | Value, "CAROL I DOMNUL ROMANIEI" ("Carol I Prince of Romania"), the effigy of Prince Carol I | "1866 - 1906", "CAROL I REGE AL ROMANIEI" ("Carol I King of Romania"), the effigy of the King | 1880 | 19 December 1931 | |
These images are to scale at 2.5 pixels per millimetre. For table standards, see the coin specification table.

==== 1910 series ====
| Image | Value | Technical parameters | | | Description | | | Date of | | |
| Image | Value | Diameter | Mass | Composition | Edge | Obverse | Reverse | first minting | withdrawal | lapse |
|---|---|---|---|---|---|---|---|---|---|---|
| | 50 bani | 18 mm | 2.5 g | Silver 83.5%, Copper 16.5% | Milled | State title, value, year of minting, olive branch, Royal Crown | "CAROL I REGE AL ROMANIEI" ("Carol I King of Romania"), the effigy of the King | 1910 | 19 December 1931 | |
| | 1 leu | 23 mm | 5 g | Silver 83.5%, Copper 16.5% | Milled | State title, value, year of minting, peasant woman | "CAROL I REGE AL ROMANIEI" ("Carol I King of Romania"), the effigy of the King | 1910 | 19 December 1931 | |
| | 2 lei | 27 mm | 10 g | Silver 83.5%, Copper 16.5% | Milled | State title, value, year of minting, peasant woman | "CAROL I REGE AL ROMANIEI" ("Carol I King of Romania"), the effigy of the King | 1910 | 19 December 1931 | |
These images are to scale at 2.5 pixels per millimetre. For table standards, see the coin specification table.

=== King Ferdinand I ===
The production of coins ceased in 1914, recommencing in 1921 with aluminium 25 and 50 bani pieces.

Cupro-nickel 1 and 2 lei coins were introduced in 1924, followed by nickel brass 10, 20 and 50 lei in 1930.

First Leu Coins – Ferdinand I Series
| Image | Value | Technical parameters | | | Description | | | Date of | | |
| Image | Value | Diameter | Mass | Composition | Edge | Obverse | Reverse | first minting | withdrawal | lapse |
|---|---|---|---|---|---|---|---|---|---|---|
| | 25 bani | 19 mm | 0.896 g | Aluminium | Smooth | Value, Royal Crown | Eagle, state title, year of minting | 1921 | 1 June 1940 | 31 March 1941 (unofficial, BNR accepted the change until mid-1942) |
| | 50 bani | 21 mm | 1.203 g | Aluminium | Smooth | Value, Royal Crown | Eagle, state title, year of minting | 1921 | 1 June 1940 | 31 March 1941 (unofficial, BNR accepted the change until mid-1942) |
| | 1 leu | 21 mm | 3.5 g | Copper 75%, Nickel 25% | Milled | "BUN PENTRU 'VALUE'" ("Good for 'value'"), wheat wreath | State title, Middle coat of arms, ***, year of minting, *** | 1924 | 1 June 1940 | 31 March 1941 (unofficial, BNR accepted the change until mid-1942) |
| | 2 lei | 25 mm | 7 g | Copper 75%, Nickel 25% | Milled | "BUN PENTRU 'VALUE'" ("Good for 'value'"), wheat wreath | State title, Middle coat of arms, ***, year of minting, *** | 1924 | 1 June 1940 | 31 March 1941 (unofficial, BNR accepted the change until mid-1942) |
These images are to scale at 2.5 pixels per millimetre. For table standards, see the coin specification table.

=== King Michael I (first reign) ===
First Leu Coins – Michael I Series I
| Image | Value | Technical parameters | | | Description | | | Date of | | |
| Image | Value | Diameter | Mass | Composition | Edge | Obverse | Reverse | first minting | withdrawal | lapse |
|---|---|---|---|---|---|---|---|---|---|---|
| | 5 lei | 21 mm | 3.5 g | Copper 79%, Zinc 20%, Nickel 1% | Milled | Value Lesser coat of arms, six five-pointed stars | "MIHAI I REGELE ROMANIEI" ("Michael I King of Romania"), effigy of the King, year of minting | 1930 | 1 January 1938 | April 1943 |
| | 20 lei | 27 mm | 7.5 g | Copper 79%, Zinc 20%, Nickel 1% | Milled | Value, group of dancing peasant women | "MIHAI I REGELE ROMANIEI" ("Michael I King of Romania"), effigy of the King, year of minting | 1930 | 19 December 1931 | 1 April 1933 |
These images are to scale at 2.5 pixels per millimetre. For table standards, see the coin specification table.

=== King Carol II ===
In 1932, silver 100 lei coins were issued. However, inflation meant that, in 1935, smaller silver 250 lei coins were introduced with nickel 100 lei coins being issued in 1936, followed by nickel 50 lei in 1937.

First Leu Coins – 1930 Series
| Image | Value | Technical parameters | | | Description | | | Date of | | |
| Image | Value | Diameter | Mass | Composition | Edge | Obverse | Reverse | first minting | withdrawal | lapse |
|---|---|---|---|---|---|---|---|---|---|---|
| | 10 lei | 23 mm | 5 g | Copper 79%, Zinc 20%, Nickel 1% | Milled | Value, the eagle from the coat of arms, effigy of the King, year of minting | "CAROL II REGELE ROMANILOR" ("Carol II, King of Romania"), year of minting | 1930 | | |
| | 20 lei | 27 mm | 7.5 g | Copper 79%, Zinc 20%, Nickel 1% | Milled | Value, the eagle from the coat of arms, effigy of the King, year of minting | "CAROL II REGELE ROMANILOR" ("Carol II, King of Romania"), year of minting | 1930 | | |
| | 100 lei | 31 mm | 14 g | Silver 50%, Copper 40%, Zinc 5%, Nickel 5% | Milled | Value, the eagle from the coat of arms, laurel leaves | "CAROL II REGELE ROMANILOR" ("Carol II, King of Romania"), effigy of the King, year of minting | 1932 | 25 July 1937 | 28 February 1938 |
| | 250 lei | 29 mm | 13.5 g | Silver 75%, Copper 25% | Milled | Value, the eagle from the coat of arms, laurel leaves | "CAROL II REGELE ROMANILOR" ("Carol II, King of Romania"), effigy of the King, year of minting | 11 February 1936 | 31 August 1938 | 15 August 1939 |
These images are to scale at 2.5 pixels per millimetre. For table standards, see the coin specification table.

First Leu Coins – 1936 Series
| Image | Value | Technical parameters | | | Description | | | Date of | | |
| Image | Value | Diameter | Mass | Composition | Edge | Obverse | Reverse | first minting | withdrawal | lapse |
|---|---|---|---|---|---|---|---|---|---|---|
| | 50 lei | 24 mm | 5.83 g | Nickel 97.5% | Milled | Value, the small shield from the coat of arms timbered by the Steel Crown, laurel and oak leaves, year of minting | "CAROL II REGELE ROMANILOR" ("Carol II King of Romania"), portrait of the King wearing a parade military helmet | September 1937 | 12 October 1941 | 31 December 1941 |
| | 100 lei | 27 mm | 8.2 g | Nickel 97.5% | Milled | Value, the small shield from the coat of arms timbered by the Steel Crown, laurel and oak leaves, year of minting | "CAROL II REGELE ROMANILOR" ("Carol II King of Romania"), effigy of the King | December 1936 | 12 October 1941 | 31 December 1941 |
| | 250 lei | 30 mm | 12 g | Silver 83,5%, Copper 16,5% | + MUNCA + CREDINTA + REGE + NATIUNE | | "CAROL II REGELE ROMANILOR" ("Carol II King of Romania"), effigy of the King | 1939 | 31 July 1941 | 31 August 1941 |
These images are to scale at 2.5 pixels per millimetre. For table standards, see the coin specification table.

First Leu Coins – 1941-1942 Series
| Image | Value | Technical parameters | | | Description | | | Date of | | |
| Image | Value | Diameter | Mass | Composition | Edge | Obverse | Reverse | first minting | withdrawal | lapse |
|---|---|---|---|---|---|---|---|---|---|---|
| | 1 leu | 18 mm | 2.75 g | nickel-brass | smooth | maize, denomination | royal crown, ROMANIA, year of minting | 1 June 1940 (all the coins marked as 1938, 1939 and 1940 were released in 1940) | | |
These images are to scale at 2.5 pixels per millimetre. For table standards, see the coin specification table.

=== King Michael I (second reign) ===
First Leu Coins – 1941-1942 Series
| Image | Value | Technical parameters | | | Description | | | Date of | | |
| Image | Value | Diameter | Mass | Composition | Edge | Obverse | Reverse | first minting | withdrawal | lapse |
|---|---|---|---|---|---|---|---|---|---|---|
| | 2 lei | 20 mm | 3.2 g | zinc | smooth | wreath, denomination | "REGATUL ROMANIEI" ("Kingdom of Romania"), crown, year of minting | 1941 | | |
| | 5 lei | 23 mm | 4.5 g | zinc | smooth | oat sprigs, denomination | "REGATUL ROMANIEI" ("Kingdom of Romania"), crown, year of minting | 1942 | | |
| | 20 lei | 26 mm | 6.0 g | zinc | reeded | wreath, denomination | "REGATUL ROMANIEI" ("Kingdom of Romania"), crown, year of minting | 1942–1944 | | |
These images are to scale at 2.5 pixels per millimetre. For table standards, see the coin specification table.

First Leu Coins – 1942 Series
| Image | Value | Technical parameters | | | Description | | | Date of | | |
| Image | Value | Diameter | Mass | Composition | Edge | Obverse | Reverse | first minting | withdrawal | lapse |
|---|---|---|---|---|---|---|---|---|---|---|
| | 100 lei | 28 mm | 8.2 g | nickel clad steel | | wreath, crown on top, denomination in the middle | "MIHAI I REGELE ROMANILOR" ("Michael I of Romania King of Romania"), effigy of the King | 1943–1944 | | |
| | 200 lei | 27 mm | 7.5 g | brass | | wreath, crown on top, denomination in the middle | "MIHAI I REGELE ROMANILOR" ("Michael I of Romania King of Romania"), effigy of the King | 1945 | | |
These images are to scale at 2.5 pixels per millimetre. For table standards, see the coin specification table.

First Leu Coins – 1942 Series
| Image | Value | Technical parameters | | | Description | | | Date of | | |
| Image | Value | Diameter | Mass | Composition | Edge | Obverse | Reverse | first minting | withdrawal | lapse |
|---|---|---|---|---|---|---|---|---|---|---|
| | 200 lei | 24 mm | 6 g | silver 0.835 | NIHIL + SINE + DEO | | "MIHAI I REGELE ROMANILOR" ("Michael I of Romania King of Romania"), effigy of the King | 1942 | | |
| | 250 lei | 30 mm | 12 g | silver 0.835 | | | "MIHAI I REGELE ROMANILOR" ("Michael I of Romania King of Romania"), effigy of the King | 10 March 1941 | | |
| | 500 lei | 37 mm | 12 g | silver 0.835 | PRIN STATORNICIE LA IZBANDA + | Kneeling Stephan the Great holding Putna Monastery; MOLDOVA LUI STEFAN IN VECI A ROMANIEI ("Stephen's Moldavia forever to belong to Romania") | "MIHAI I REGELE ROMANILOR" ("Michael I of Romania King of Romania"), effigy of the King | 1941 | | |
| | 500 lei | 32 mm | 12 g | silver 0.700 | | | "MIHAI I REGELE ROMANILOR" ("Michael I of Romania King of Romania"), effigy of the King | June 1944 | 28 August 1945 | 15 September 1945 |
| | 500 lei | 30 mm | 10 g | brass | | | "MIHAI I REGELE ROMANILOR" ("Michael I of Romania King of Romania"), effigy of the King | 1945 | | |
These images are to scale at 2.5 pixels per millimetre. For table standards, see the coin specification table.

First Leu Coins – 1946-47 Series
| Image | Value | Technical parameters | | | Description | | | Date of | | |
| Image | Value | Diameter | Mass | Composition | Edge | Obverse | Reverse | first minting | withdrawal | lapse |
|---|---|---|---|---|---|---|---|---|---|---|
| | 500 lei | 24 mm | 1.5 g | aluminium | | | "MIHAI I REGELE ROMANILOR" ("Michael I of Romania King of Romania"), effigy of the King | 1946 | 15 August 1947 | 15 August 1947 |
| | 2000 lei | 24 mm | 5.1 g | brass | | | "MIHAI I REGELE ROMANILOR" ("Michael I of Romania King of Romania"), effigy of the King | 1946 | 15 August 1947 | 15 August 1947 |
| | 10,000 lei | 27 mm | 10 g | brass | | | "MIHAI I REGELE ROMANILOR" ("Michael I of Romania King of Romania"), effigy of the King | 1947 | 15 August 1947 | 15 August 1947 |
| | 25,000 lei | 32 mm | 12.5 g | silver 0.700 | | | "MIHAI I REGELE ROMANILOR" ("Michael I of Romania King of Romania"), effigy of the King | 1946 | 15 August 1947 | 15 August 1947 |
| | 100,000 lei | 37 mm | 25 g | silver 0.700 | | | "MIHAI I REGELE ROMANILOR" ("Michael I of Romania King of Romania"), effigy of the King | 1946 | 15 August 1947 | 15 August 1947 |
These images are to scale at 2.5 pixels per millimetre. For table standards, see the coin specification table.

== Second leu ==
In 1947, coins were issued before the abdication of King Michael I, in denominations of 50 bani, 1, 2 and 5 lei.

=== King Michael I ===
Second Leu Coins – 1947 Series
| Image | Value | Technical parameters | | | Description | | | Date of | | |
| Image | Value | Diameter | Mass | Composition | Edge | Obverse | Reverse | first minting | withdrawal | lapse |
|---|---|---|---|---|---|---|---|---|---|---|
| | 50 bani | 16 mm | 1.7 g | nickel-brass | | value | "ROMANIA", crown, year of minting | 15 August 1947 | 1948 | 1952 |
| | 1 leu | 18 mm | 2.5 g | brass | | value, ears of wheat on the sides | "ROMANIA", royal coat of arms, olive branches, year of minting | 15 August 1947 | 1948 | 1952 |
| | 2 lei | 21 mm | 3.5 g | bronze | | value, ears of wheat on the sides | "ROMANIA", royal coat of arms, olive branches, year of minting | 15 August 1947 | 1948 | 1952 |
| | 5 lei | 23 mm | 1.5 g | aluminium | | value, ears of wheat | portrait of King Michael, "MIHAI I REGELE ROMANILOR", year of minting | 15 August 1947 | 1948 | 1952 |
These images are to scale at 2.5 pixels per millimetre. For table standards, see the coin specification table.

=== People's Republic of Romania ===
After the creation of the People's Republic, new coins were issued between 1948 and 1952, in denominations of 1, 2, 5 and 20 lei.

Second Leu Coins – 1947 Series
| Image | Value | Technical parameters | | | Description | | | Date of | | |
| Image | Value | Diameter | Mass | Composition | Edge | Obverse | Reverse | first minting | withdrawal | lapse |
|---|---|---|---|---|---|---|---|---|---|---|
| | 1 leu | 16 mm | 1.83 g | nickel-brass | | value, year of minting | oil well, rising sun | 1948 | 30 January 1952 | 1 February 1952 |
| | 1 leu | 16 mm | 0.61 g | aluminium | | value, year of minting | oil well, rising sun | 1948 | 30 January 1952 | 1 February 1952 |
| | 2 lei | 18 mm | 2.44 g | nickel-brass | | value, year of minting | corn cob | 1948 | 30 January 1952 | 1 February 1952 |
| | 2 lei | 18 mm | 0.84 g | aluminium | | value, year of minting | corn cob | 1948 | 30 January 1952 | 1 February 1952 |
| | 5 lei | 23 mm | 3.5 g | bronze | | olive wreath, value, year of minting | coat of arms, "REPUBLICA POPULARA ROMANA" | 1948 | 30 January 1952 | 1 February 1952 |
| | 20 lei | 26 mm | 1.5 g | aluminium | | Blacksmith at work using a hammer and an anvil, factory in the background, value | coat of arms, "REPUBLICA POPULARA ROMANA", year of minting | 1948 | 30 January 1952 | 1 February 1952 |
These images are to scale at 2.5 pixels per millimetre. For table standards, see the coin specification table.

== Third leu ==
=== People's Republic of Romania ===
In 1952, coins were introduced in denominations of 1, 3, 5, 10 and 25 bani, with the 1, 3 and 5 struck in aluminium bronze and the others in cupro-nickel. In 1955, cupro-nickel 50 bani were added.

Third Leu Coins – 1952 Series
| Image | Value | Technical parameters | | | Description | | | Date of | | |
| Image | Value | Diameter | Mass | Composition | Edge | Obverse | Reverse | first minting | withdrawal | lapse |
|---|---|---|---|---|---|---|---|---|---|---|
| | 1 ban | 16 mm | 1.0g | aluminium bronze | Milled | Value, year of minting | Coat of arms | 28 January 1952 | 31 December 1996 | 16 January 1997 |
| | 3 bani | 18 mm | 2.0g | aluminium bronze | Milled | Value, year of minting | Coat of arms | 28 January 1952 | 31 December 1996 | 16 January 1997 |
| | 5 bani | 20 mm | 2.4g | aluminium bronze | Milled | Value, year of minting | Coat of arms | 28 January 1952 | 31 December 1996 | 16 January 1997 |
| | 10 bani | 17 mm | 1.8g | cupro-nickel | Milled | olive wreath, year of minting, value | Coat of arms, Republica Populară Română (Romanian People's Republic) or Republica Populară Romînă | 28 January 1952 | 31 December 1996 | 16 January 1997 |
| | 25 bani | 22 mm | 3.6g | cupro-nickel | Milled | olive wreath, year of minting, value | Coat of arms, Republica Populară Română (Romanian People's Republic) or Republica Populară Romînă | 28 January 1952 | 31 December 1996 | 16 January 1997 |
| | 50 bani | 25 mm | 4.55g | cupro-nickel | Milled | Blacksmith at work using a hammer and an anvil, factory in the background, value | Coat of arms, Republica Populară Română (Romanian People's Republic), year of minting | 1955 | 31 December 1996 | 16 January 1997 |
These images are to scale at 2.5 pixels per millimetre. For table standards, see the coin specification table.

In 1960, a new coinage was introduced, consisting of 15 and 25 bani, with 5 bani, 1 and 3 lei coins added in 1963. All were struck in nickel-clad steel. In 1975, aluminium replaced steel in the 5 and 15 bani, with the same change happening for the 25 bani in 1982. Aluminium 5 lei were introduced in 1978.

Third Leu Coins – 1960 Series
| Image | Value | Technical parameters | | | Description | | | Date of | | |
| Image | Value | Diameter | Mass | Composition | Edge | Obverse | Reverse | first minting | withdrawal | lapse |
|---|---|---|---|---|---|---|---|---|---|---|
| | 5 bani | 16 mm | | Nickel-plated steel | Smooth | Value, year of minting | Coat of arms, Republica Populară Română (Romanian People's Republic), year of first minting | 1960 | 31 December 1996 | 16 January 1997 |
| | 15 bani | 19,5 mm | | Nickel-plated steel | Smooth | Value, olive leaves | Coat of arms, Republica Populară Română (Romanian People's Republic), year of first minting | 1960 | 31 December 1996 | 16 January 1997 |
| | 25 bani | 22 mm | | Nickel-plated steel | Smooth | Value, agricultural scene, wheat | Coat of arms, Republica Populară Română (Romanian People's Republic), year of first minting | 1960 | 31 December 1996 | 16 January 1997 |
| | 1 leu | 24,6 mm | | Nickel-plated steel | Smooth | Value, agricultural landscape; industrial elements in the background | Coat of arms, Republica Populară Română (Romanian People's Republic), year of first minting | 1963 | 31 December 1996 | 16 January 1997 |
| | 3 lei | 27 mm | | Nickel-plated steel | Smooth | Value, industrial landscape | Coat of arms, Republica Populară Română (Romanian People's Republic), year of first minting | 1963 | 31 December 1996 | 16 January 1997 |
These images are to scale at 2.5 pixels per millimetre. For table standards, see the coin specification table.

=== Socialist Republic of Romania ===
Third Leu Coins – 1966 Series
| Image | Value | Technical parameters | | | Description | | | Date of | | |
| Image | Value | Diameter | Mass | Composition | Edge | Obverse | Reverse | first minting | withdrawal | lapse |
|---|---|---|---|---|---|---|---|---|---|---|
| | 5 bani | 16 mm | 1.7 g | Nickel-plated steel | Smooth | Value, year of minting | Coat of arms | 1 November 1966 | 1 January 1997 | 16 January 1997 |
| | 15 bani | 19.5 mm | 2.88 g | Nickel-plated steel | Smooth | Value, olive leaves | Coat of arms, Republica Socialistă România ("Socialist Republic of Romania"), year of first minting | 1 November 1966 | 1 January 1997 | 16 January 1997 |
| | 25 bani | 22 mm | 3.38 g | Nickel-plated steel | Smooth | Value, agricultural scene, wheat | Coat of arms, Republica Socialistă România ("Socialist Republic of Romania"), year of first minting | 1 November 1966 | 1 January 1997 | 16 January 1997 |
| | 1 leu | 24.6 mm | 5.0 g | Nickel-plated steel | Smooth | Value, agricultural landscape; industrial elements in the background | Coat of arms, Republica Socialistă România ("Socialist Republic of Romania"), year of first minting | 1 November 1966 | 1 January 1997 | 16 January 1997 |
| | 3 lei | 27 mm | 5.86 g | Nickel-plated steel | " Smooth with two wavy lines and a star (~ ~☆)" | Value, industrial landscape | Coat of arms, Republica Socialistă România ("Socialist Republic of Romania"), year of first minting | 1 November 1966 | 1 January 1997 | 16 January 1997 |
These images are to scale at 2.5 pixels per millimetre. For table standards, see the coin specification table.

Third Leu Coins – 1975/1978/1982 Series
| Image | Value | Technical parameters | | | Description | | | Date of | | |
| Image | Value | Diameter | Mass | Composition | Edge | Obverse | Reverse | first minting | withdrawal | lapse |
|---|---|---|---|---|---|---|---|---|---|---|
| | 5 bani | 16 mm | 0.5 g | Aluminium | Smooth | Value, year of minting | Coat of arms | 1975 | 1 January 1997 | 16 January 1997 |
| | 15 bani | 19.5 mm | 1.0 g | Aluminium | Smooth | Value, olive leaves | Coat of arms, Republica Socialistă România ("Socialist Republic of Romania"), year of first minting | 1975 | 1 January 1997 | 16 January 1997 |
| | 25 bani | 22 mm | 1.3 g | Aluminium | Smooth | Value, agricultural scene, wheat | Coat of arms, Republica Socialistă România ("Socialist Republic of Romania"), year of first minting | 1982 | 1 January 1997 | 16 January 1997 |
| | 5 lei | 29 mm | 2.8 g | Aluminium | " Smooth with two wavy lines and a star (~ ~☆)" | Value, industrial scene, wheat, and cogwheel | Coat of arms, Republica Socialistă România ("Socialist Republic of Romania"), year of first minting | 1978 | 1 January 1997 | 16 January 1997 |
These images are to scale at 2.5 pixels per millimetre. For table standards, see the coin specification table.

=== Post-Communist Romania ===
Following the end of the communist regime, a new coinage was introduced between 1990 and 1992, consisting of 1 leu in cooper clad steel, 5 and 10 lei in nickel-plated steel, 20 and 50 lei in brass clad steel and nickel-plated steel 100 lei.

Third Leu Coins – 1990 Series
| Image | Value | Technical parameters | | | Description | | | Date of | | |
| Image | Value | Diameter | Mass | Composition | Edge | Obverse | Reverse | first minting | withdrawal | lapse |
|---|---|---|---|---|---|---|---|---|---|---|
| | 1 leu | 19 mm | 2.50 g | Copper-plated steel | Smooth | Value, oak leaves, wheat | Insignia of the National Bank, state title, year of minting, oak leaves | 1992 | 1 July 2005 | Indefinite |
| | 1 leu | 19 mm | 2.50 g | Copper-plated steel | Smooth | Value, state title, wheat | Coat of arms, year of minting | 1993 | 31 December 2006 | Indefinite |
| | 5 lei | 21 mm | 3.35 g | Nickel-plated steel | Smooth | State Title, value, oak leaves | Coat of arms, year of minting | 1992 | 1 July 2003 | 1 July 2004 |
| | 10 lei | 23 mm | 4.65 g | Nickel-plated steel | Smooth with waves and dots (~•~•~•) | Value, year of minting, olive leaves | Flag, state title, "22 DECEMBRIE 1989" | 26 December 1990 | 1 July 2003 | 1 July 2004 |
| | 10 lei | 23 mm | 5 g | Nickel-plated steel | Smooth | State title, value, olive leaves | Coat of arms, year of minting | 1992 | 1 July 2003 | 1 July 2004 |
| | 20 lei | 24,1 mm | 5 g | Brass-plated steel | Smooth | Value, oak leaves, year of minting | Ștefan cel Mare, state title, "ȘTEFAN CEL MARE" | 9 September 1991 | 1 July 2003 | 1 July 2004 |
| | 50 lei | 26,1 mm | 5.9 g | Brass-plated steel | Smooth | Value, olive leaves, year of minting | Alexandru Ioan Cuza, state title, "ALEXANDRU IOAN CUZA" | 9 September 1991 | 1 July 2003 | 1 July 2004 |
| | 100 lei | 29,1 mm | 8.75 g | Nickel-plated steel | Smooth with three inscriptions and nine stars (ROMANIA *** ROMANIA *** ROMANIA ***) | Value, oak leaves, olive leaves, year of minting | Mihai Viteazul, state title, "MIHAI VITEAZUL" | 1 December 1991 | 31 December 2006 | Indefinite |
| | 500 lei | 25 mm | 3.75 g | Magnesium - Aluminium alloy (AlMg_{3}) | Smooth with three inscriptions and three rhombuses (ROMANIA ♦ ROMANIA ♦ ROMANIA ♦) | State title, value, olive leaves | Coat of arms, year of minting, olive leaves | 15 March 1999 | 31 December 2006 | Indefinite |
| | 500 lei | 25 mm | 3.75 g | Magnesium - Aluminium alloy (AlMg_{3}) | Smooth with three inscriptions and three rhombuses (ROMANIA ♦ ROMANIA ♦ ROMANIA ♦) | State title, value, Coat of arms, year of minting, a moon eclipsing the Sun | "ECLIPSA TOTALĂ DE SOARE 11 AUGUST 1999", allegoric representation of the eclipse, "'99" | 11 August 1999 | 31 December 2006 | Indefinite |
| | 1,000 lei | 22,2 mm | 2 g | Magnesium - Aluminium alloy (AlMg_{3}) | Alternately smooth and milled | State title, value, year of minting, Coat of arms | Constantin Brâncoveanu, years of rule, "CONSTANTIN BRANCOVEANU" | 2000 | 31 December 2006 | Indefinite |
| | 5,000 lei | 23,5 mm dodecagonal | 2.50 g | Magnesium - Aluminium alloy (AlMg_{3}) | Twelve smooth edges | State title, value | Coat of arms, year of minting, ornamental leaves | 2001 | 31 December 2006 | Indefinite |
These images are to scale at 2.5 pixels per millimetre. For table standards, see the coin specification table.

As inflation took its toll, 500, 1,000 and 5,000 lei coins were introduced in 1999, 2000 and 2001, respectively, and were the only coins circulating when the revaluation occurred. They were all criticized for being clumsy and difficult to use. The 500 lei coins were very thick (about 0.3 cm). Despite their small value, it took only a handful of such coins to fill one's pocket. They were also made of poor material and could be occasionally found with bite marks. The 1000 lei coin was considered too small and was also cheaply made, and the 5000 lei coin was not circular (it was a dodecagon). This made it awkward to handle and difficult to use in slot machines, where it was frequently the only coin accepted. The 500, 1,000 and 5,000 lei coins became worth 5, 10 and 50 bani with the revaluation.

== Fourth leu ==
In 2005, the following coins were introduced for circulation:

New Leu Coins (2005 series)
| Image | Value | Technical parameters | | | | Description | | | Date of | |
| Image | Value | Diameter | Thickness | Mass | Composition | Edge | Obverse | Reverse | first minting | issue |
|---|---|---|---|---|---|---|---|---|---|---|
| | 1 b | 16.75 mm | 1.6 mm | 2.4 g | Brass-plated steel | Smooth | Coat of arms, state title, year of minting | Value | 2005 | 1 July 2005 |
| | 5 b | 18.25 mm | 1.6 mm | 2.8 g | Copper-plated steel | Milled (102 reeds) | Coat of arms, state title, year of minting | Value | 2005 | 1 July 2005 |
| | 10 b | 20.50 mm | 1.8 mm | 4.0 g | Nickel-plated steel | Alternately smooth and milled (3 groups of 20 reeds) | Coat of arms, state title, year of minting | Value | 2005 | 1 July 2005 |
| | 50 b | 23.75 mm | 1.9 mm | 6.1 g | Brass; 80% copper 15% zinc 5% nickel | "ROMANIA * ROMANIA *" | Coat of arms, state title, year of minting | Value | 2005 | 1 July 2005 |

Commemorative issues of 50-bani coins include:

Commemorative issues of 50-bani coins (2010 onwards)
| Image | Edge | Obverse | Reverse | first minting | Date of issue |
|---|---|---|---|---|---|
| | "ROMANIA * ROMANIA *" | Value, Coat of arms, state title, year of minting | Aurel Vlaicu, 1910 (year of first Romanian flight), years of birth and death of Aurel Vlaicu | 2010 | 25 October 2010 |
| | "ROMANIA * ROMANIA *" | Value, Coat of arms, state title, year of minting, Cozia Monastery | Mircea cel Bătrân, 1386-1418 (years of reign) | 2011 | 12 September 2011 |
| | "ROMANIA * ROMANIA *" | Value, "ROMANIA", year of issue "2012", Curtea de Argeș monastery church in section, Coat of arms | Portrait of Neagoe Basarab, Curtea de Argeș church, "1512", "BISERICA MANASTIRII CURTEA DE ARGES" "NEAGOE BASARAB" | 2012 | 25 June 2012 |
| | "ROMANIA * ROMANIA *" | Value, "ROMANIA", year of issue "2014", a composition representing St. Nicholas Princely Church in Curtea de Argeș | Portrait of Prince Vladislav I Vlaicu, the obverse and the reverse of a ducat that he issued, the inscriptions “VLADISLAV I VLAICU” and “1364” (the year of his ascent to the throne of Wallachia) | 2014 | 28 April 2014 |
| | "ROMANIA * ROMANIA *" | Value, "ROMANIA", year of issue "2015", Coat of arms, in the background a continuous five row inscription of the text: "BNR50" | The Old Palace of the Romanian National Bank, the inscriptions "10 ANI", "DENOMINAREA MONEDEI NATIONALE" and "2005" the year of the denomination. | 2015 | 1 July 2015 |
| | "ROMANIA * ROMANIA *" | Value, "ROMANIA", year of issue "2016", Coat of arms, Corvin Castle in the background | Iancu de Hunedoara, name, "1441–1446" (years of reign as Voivode of Transylvania) | 2016 | 4 April 2016 |
| | "ROMANIA * ROMANIA *" | Value, "ROMANIA", year of issue "2017", Coat of arms, Brâncovenesc art in the background | Map of the European Union with the borders of the member states, "10 ANI DE LA ADERAREA LA UNIUNEA EUROPEANĂ" (10 Years since the Accession of Romania to the European Union) | 2017 | 19 June 2017 |
| | "ROMANIA * ROMANIA *" | Value, "ROMANIA", year of issue "2018", Coat of arms, "MAREA ADUNARE DE LA ALBA IULIA" (The Great National Assembly of Alba Iulia, scene from the Great National Assembly of Alba Iulia in the background | "100 DE ANI DE LA MAREA UNIRE" (100 Years since the Great Union), portraits of Ștefan Cicio-Pop, Gheorghe Pop de Băsești, Iuliu Maniu, Vasile Goldiș, and Iuliu Hossu | 2018 | 26 November 2018 |
| | "ROMANIA * ROMANIA *" | Value, "ROMANIA", year of issue "2019", Coat of arms, places of worship visited by Pope Francis during the visit: Saint Joseph Cathedral, Bucharest, Marian Shrine of Șumuleu Ciuc, Cathedral of the Holy Trinity, Blaj, and Our Lady Queen Cathedral in Iași | Pope Francis, and his coat of arms, "VIZITA APOSTOLICĂ A SANCTITĂȚII SALE PAPA FRANCISC ÎN ROMÂNIA" (Pastoral Visit of His Holyness Pope Francis to Romania), "SĂ MERGEM ÎMPREUNĂ!" (Let us walk together!, motto of the visit), and "31 MAI-2 IUNIE" (31 May-2 June), period of visit | 2019 | 30 May 2019 |
| | "ROMANIA * ROMANIA *" | Value, "ROMANIA", year of issue "2019", Coat of arms images from the first visit of King Ferdinand I, and Queen Marie in Transylvania, after the War on the background | King Ferdinand I, "FERDINAND I ÎNTREGITORUL" (Ferdinad I the Unifier) | 2019 | 27 August 2019 |
| | "ROMANIA * ROMANIA *" | Value, "ROMANIA", year of issue "2019", Coat of arms, images from the first visit of King Ferdinand I, and Queen Marie during a front visit on the background | Marie, "REGINA MARIA" (Queen Marie) | 2019 | 27 October 2019 |
| | "ROMANIA * ROMANIA *" | Value, "ROMANIA", year of issue "2019", Coat of arms, image of a young boy flying a flag without the coat of arms, making the V sign | "REVOLUȚIA DIN DECEMBRIE 1989" (Romanian Revolution of 1989), scene during th erevolution (tank in the nowardays Revolution Square) | 2019 | 16 December 2019 |
These images are to scale at 2.5 pixels per millimetre. For table standards, see the coin specification table.
