= Emblem of the Socialist Republic of Romania =

Emblem of Romania
- Armiger: Socialist Republic of Romania
- Adopted: 1965
- Crest: Red star
- Shield: A landscape consisting of a fir-wood and the Carpathian Mountains, on the dexter a derrick and in the sky a rising sun all proper.
- Supporters: Stalks of wheat
- Motto: Republica Socialistă România ("Socialist Republic of Romania")
- Use: 1965-1989

The emblem of the Socialist Republic of Romania was an emblem of Romania in 1965–1989.

After 1948, Communist authorities changed both the flag and the coat of arms. The coat of arms became more emblematically faithful to Communist symbolism: a landscape (depicting a rising sun, a tractor and an oil drill) surrounded by stocks of wheat tied together with a cloth in the colors of the national flag. The pattern of the emblem was modeled after the state emblem of the Soviet Union.

Between 1948 and 1966, there were three variants. The first came shortly after 1948 (the proclamation of the people's republic). The emblem shows a landscape with a fir-wood and the Carpathian Mountains, on the dexter a derrick and in the sky a rising sun all proper. On the ears, were the wheat with the motto "RPR" in white lettering on a ribbon. In 1952, the red star was added.

The final change to the communist emblem took place in 1965 when Romania ceased to be a People's Republic, and became a Socialist Republic. At this time, the wording changed from RPR to Republica Socialistă România with some minor changes to the ribbon. The emblem remained in use until the fall of Nicolae Ceaușescu and the communist regime, the communist emblem was removed from all flags, and official seals. Some flags had a hole (a symbol of the revolution) and some changed to the later official blue-yellow-red format. The wording changed to just România. The new coat of arms replaced the socialist emblem in 1992.

January–March 1948

March 1948–1952

1952–1965

== See also ==
- Coat of arms of Romania
- List of Romanian coats of arms
- Emblem of the Moldavian Soviet Socialist Republic
