= Coat of arms of Romania =

Versions
- The version used for ministerial seals and on identity cards
- Armiger: Romania
- Adopted: 11 July 2016 (current version)
- Shield: Azure, a crowned eagle displayed Or beaked and membered Gules holding in its beak an Orthodox Cross Or, in its dexter talon a sword, and in its sinister talon a sceptre Argent, and bearing on its heart an escutcheon quarterly: I, Azure, an eagle displayed Or beaked and membered Gules holding in its beak an Orthodox Cross Or, in dexter chief a sun in splendour and in sinister chief an increscent of the last (for Wallachia); II, gules, a bull's head caboshed Sable, in dexter base a rose, in sinister base a decrescent Argent, and between the bull's horns a mullet Or (for Western Moldavia); III, Gules, issuant from water in base Azure a bridge of two arches embattled throughout, thereon a lion rampant Or brandishing a sabre proper (for Oltenia and Banat); IV, Per fess Azure and Or, a bar Gules issuant therefrom an eagle displayed Sable between in sinister chief a decrescent Argent and in dexter chief a sun in splendour Or; in base seven castles Gules (for Transylvania); Entée en point, Azure, two dolphins urinant respectant Or (for Dobrogea)
- Earlier version: 1922–1947, the Kingdom of Romania
- Use: On the national currency, in classrooms, in the Parliament, on state buildings, on passports, on ID cards, in the header of the official documents (including diplomas)

The coat of arms of Romania was adopted in the Romanian Parliament on 10 September 1992 as a representative coat of arms for Romania. The current coat of arms is based on the lesser coat of arms of interwar Kingdom of Romania (used between 1922 and 1947), which was designed in 1921 by the Transylvanian Hungarian heraldist József Sebestyén from Cluj, at the request of King Ferdinand I of Romania, it was redesigned by Victor Dima. As a central element, it shows a golden aquila holding a cross in its beak, and a mace and a sword in its claws. It also consists of the three colors (red, yellow, and blue) which represent the colors of the national flag. The coat of arms was augmented on 11 July 2016 to add a representation of the Steel Crown of Romania.

== History ==
=== United Principalities of Moldavia and Wallachia (1859-1881) and the Kingdom of Romania (1881-1947) ===
The idea behind the design of the coat of arms of Romania dates from 1859, when the two Romanian countries, Wallachia and Moldavia, united under Prince Alexandru Ioan Cuza. Then the two heraldic symbols, the golden aquila and the aurochs, were officially juxtaposed.

Until 1866, there were many variants of the coat of arms, regarding the background color and the number of times the two main elements where represented. In 1866, after Carol I was elected Prince of Romania, the shield was divided into quarters: in the first and fourth an eagle was depicted, and in the second and third the aurochs; above the shield the arms of the reigning Hohenzollern family was placed. After 1872, the coat of arms included the symbol of southern Bessarabia (after 1877, of Dobruja), two dolphins, in the fourth quarter; and the one of Oltenia, a golden lion, in the third quarter; on the shield the Steel Crown was placed, as a symbol of sovereignty and independence, after the Romanian War of Independence.

The coat of arms remained unchanged until 1921, after World War I, when Transylvania was united with the Kingdom of Romania. Then the coat of arms of Transylvania was placed in the fourth quarter, with the Eagle (heraldry), the third quarter depicted the coat of arms of Banat (the bridge of Apollodorus of Damascus and a golden lion), and the coat of arms of Dobruja was placed in an insertion. The shield was placed on the chest of a golden crossed and crowned aquila, as a symbol of the Latinity of the Romanians. The aquila was placed on a blue shield, capped with the Steel Crown. The coat of arms had three versions: lesser, middle (with supporters and motto), and greater (the middle arms on a red mantle lined with ermine). The coat of arms was designed by Transylvanian Hungarian József Sebestyén Keöpeczi, who was recommended by Alexandru Tzigara-Samurcaș.

=== People's Republic of Romania (1948-1965) and the Socialist Republic of Romania (1965-1992) ===
After 1948, the Communist authorities changed both the flag and the coat of arms. The coat of arms was rather an emblem, faithful to the Communist pattern: a landscape (depicting a rising sun, a tractor and an oil drill) surrounded by stocks of wheat tied together with a cloth in the colors of the national flag. Until 1989, there were four variants, the first being changed shortly after 1948 (the proclamation of the republic), again changed in 1952 (a red star was added), and finally in 1965, when Romania ceased to be a People's Republic and became a Socialist Republic.

=== Republic of Romania (1992-now) ===
Immediately after the 1989 Revolution, the idea came up of giving Romania a new, representative coat of arms. In fact, the very symbol of the Revolution was the flag with a hole in its middle where the communist coat of arms had been cut out.

The heraldic commission set up to design a new coat of arms for Romania worked intensely, subjecting to the Parliament two final designs which were then combined. What emerged is the current design adopted by the two chambers of the Romanian Parliament in their joint session on September 10, 1992.

In April 2016, deputies of the Judiciary Committee endorsed a bill voted previously by the Senate that returns the crown on the head of the eagle and mandates the public authorities to replace the existing emblems and seals to those provided by law no later than 31 December 2018 (to mark the centenary of the Union of Transylvania with Romania on 1 December 1918). The bill was adopted by the Chamber of Deputies on 8 June 2016 and promulgated by President Klaus Iohannis on 11 July 2016.

== Description ==
The shield surmounting the eagle is divided into five fields, one for each historical province with its traditional symbol:

- golden aquila – Wallachia or Muntenia (Țara Românească) and the Aromanians
- aurochs – Moldavia (Moldova), Bessarabia (Basarabia), Bukovina (Bucovina, as part of North Moldavia) and Maramureș
- dolphins – the seaside: Southern Bessarabia/Budjak (1867–1878) and Dobruja (after 1878)
- black eagle for Crișana and seven castles, a sun and a moon for Transylvania (Transilvania)
- lion rampant and Trajan's Bridge – Oltenia, Banat and Timok Valley

Romania's coat of arms has as a central element the golden aquila holding an Orthodox cross. Traditionally, this eagle appears in the arms of the Argeș county, the town of Pitești and the town of Curtea de Argeș. It stands for the "nest of the Basarabs", the nucleus around which Wallachia was organised.

Since July 11, 2016 the coat of arms has been altered to include the heraldic representation of the Steel Crown of King Carol. A symbol of its royal past and a token for the period during 1881 and 1947 when Romania was a monarchy, ruled by the Hohenzollern-Sigmaringen house through its Romanian branch, founded by Carol.

The aquila, being the symbol of Latinity and a heraldic bird of the first order, symbolises courage, determination, the soaring toward great heights, power, grandeur

The shield on which it is placed is azure, symbolising the sky. The eagle holds in its talons the insignia of sovereignty: a mace and a sword, the latter reminding of Moldavia's ruler, Stephen the Great whereas the mace reminds of Michael the Brave, the first unifier of the Romanian Countries. On the bird's chest there is a quartered escutcheon with the symbols of the historical provinces (Wallachia, Oltenia, Moldavia, Bessarabia, Transylvania, the Banat, Crisana, Maramureș) as well as two dolphins reminding of the country's Black Sea Coast (Dobruja).

In the first quarter, Wallachia's coat of arms, an aquila or holding in its beak a golden Orthodox cross, accompanied by a golden sun on the right and a golden new moon on the left, is displayed against an azure background.

In the second quarter, Moldavia's traditional coat of arms is shown, gules: an aurochs head sable with a mullet of or between its horns, a cinquefoil rose on the dexter and a waning crescent on the sinister, both argent.

The third quarter features the traditional coat of arms of the Banat and Oltenia, gules: over waves, a golden bridge with two arched openings (symbolising Roman emperor Trajan's Bridge over the Danube), wherefrom comes a golden lion holding a broadsword in its right forepaw.

The fourth quarter shows the coat of arms of Transylvania: a shield parted by a narrow fesse, gules; in the chief, on blue, there is a black eagle with golden beak coming out of the fesse, accompanied by a golden sun on the dexter and a crescent argent on the sinister (symbolizing the Székelys); on the base, on or, there are seven crenellated towers, placed four and three (symbolizing the Saxons).

Also represented are the lands adjacent to the Black Sea (Dobruja), on azure: two dolphins affronts, head down.

== Gallery ==
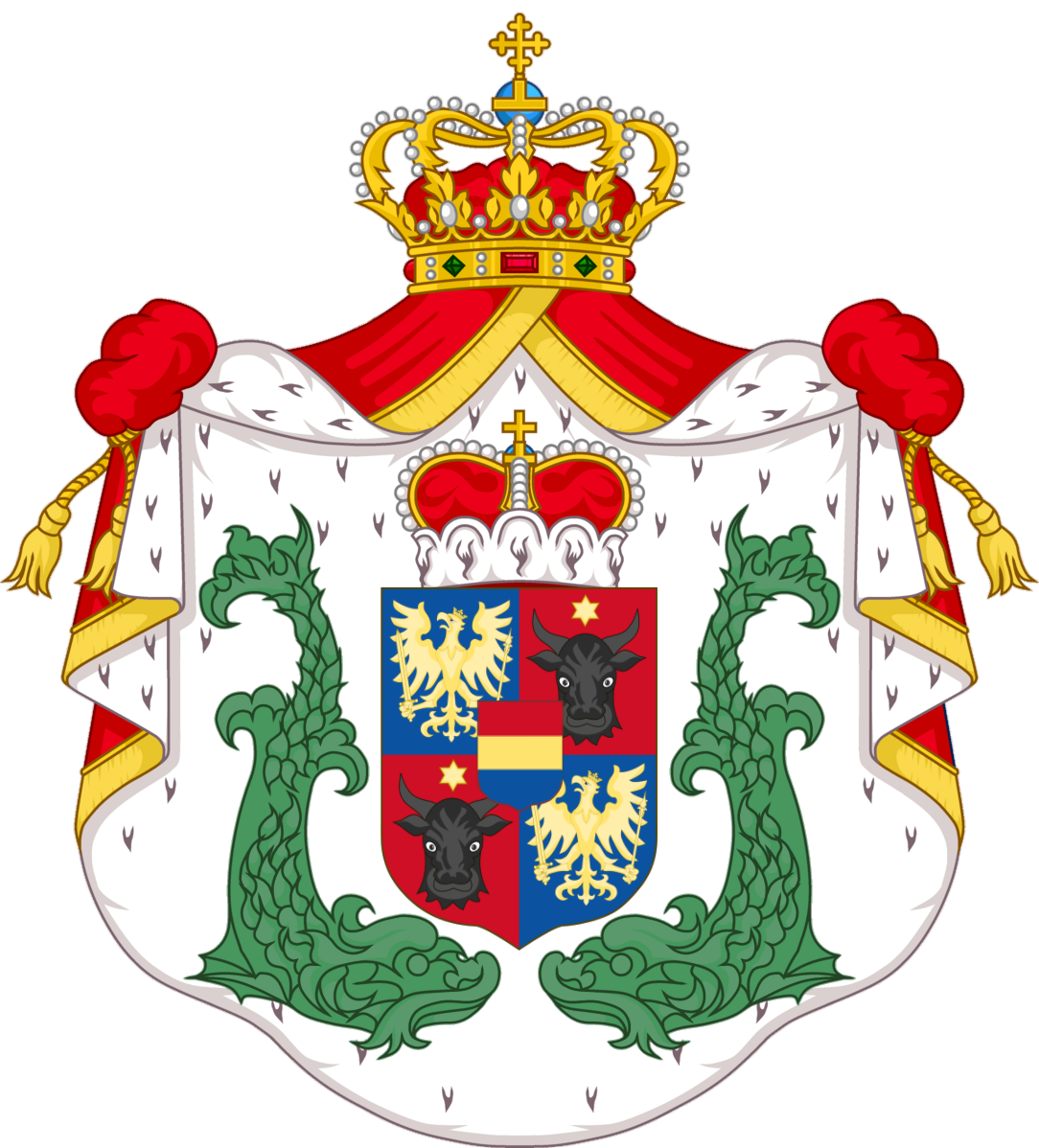
One of the many designs used unofficially as coat of arms (1864 – 1866)

Coat of arms of the Principality of Romania (1867 – 1872)

Coat of arms of the Principality of Romania (1872 – 1881)

Coat of arms of the Kingdom of Romania (1881 – 1922)

The lesser coat of arms of the Kingdom of Romania (1921 – 1947), used on official stamps and seals

The middle coat of arms of the Kingdom of Romania (1921 – 1947), used by the Romanian Army and the State authorities

The Great Coat of Arms according to the Official Gazette, no. 92 of 29 July 1921. (1921 – 1947)

Seal of the National Legionary State (1940 – 1941)

Coat of arms of the Romanian People's Republic (January – March 1948)

Coat of arms of the Romanian People's Republic (March 1948 – 1952)

Coat of arms of the Romanian People's Republic (1952 – 1965)

Coat of arms of the Socialist Republic of Romania (1965 – 1989) and Romania (1989 – 1992)

Unofficial emblem of Romania used between 1990 and 1992

Coat of arms of Romania (1992 – 2016)

The coat of arms of Romania since 2016 (fully replaced the previous version by the end of 2018)

== See also ==
- Romanian heraldry
- Emblem of the Socialist Republic of Romania
- Coat of arms of Moldova
