= Steel Crown of Romania =

Jewel of the Romanian Royal House

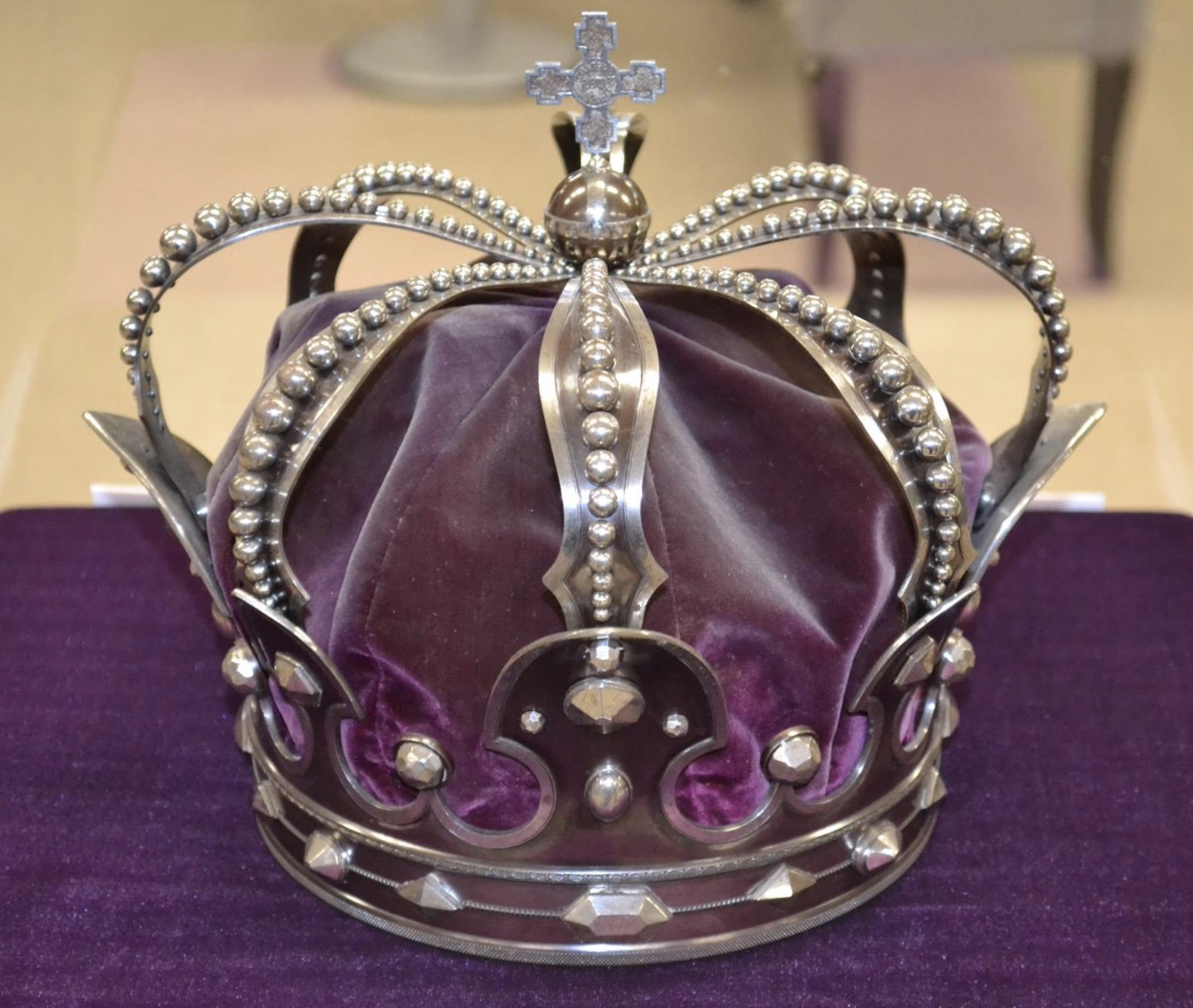

Heraldic depictions

Details
- Country: Romania
- Made: 1881
- Weight: 1,12 kg
- Arches: 8
- Material: Steel
- Notable stones: None

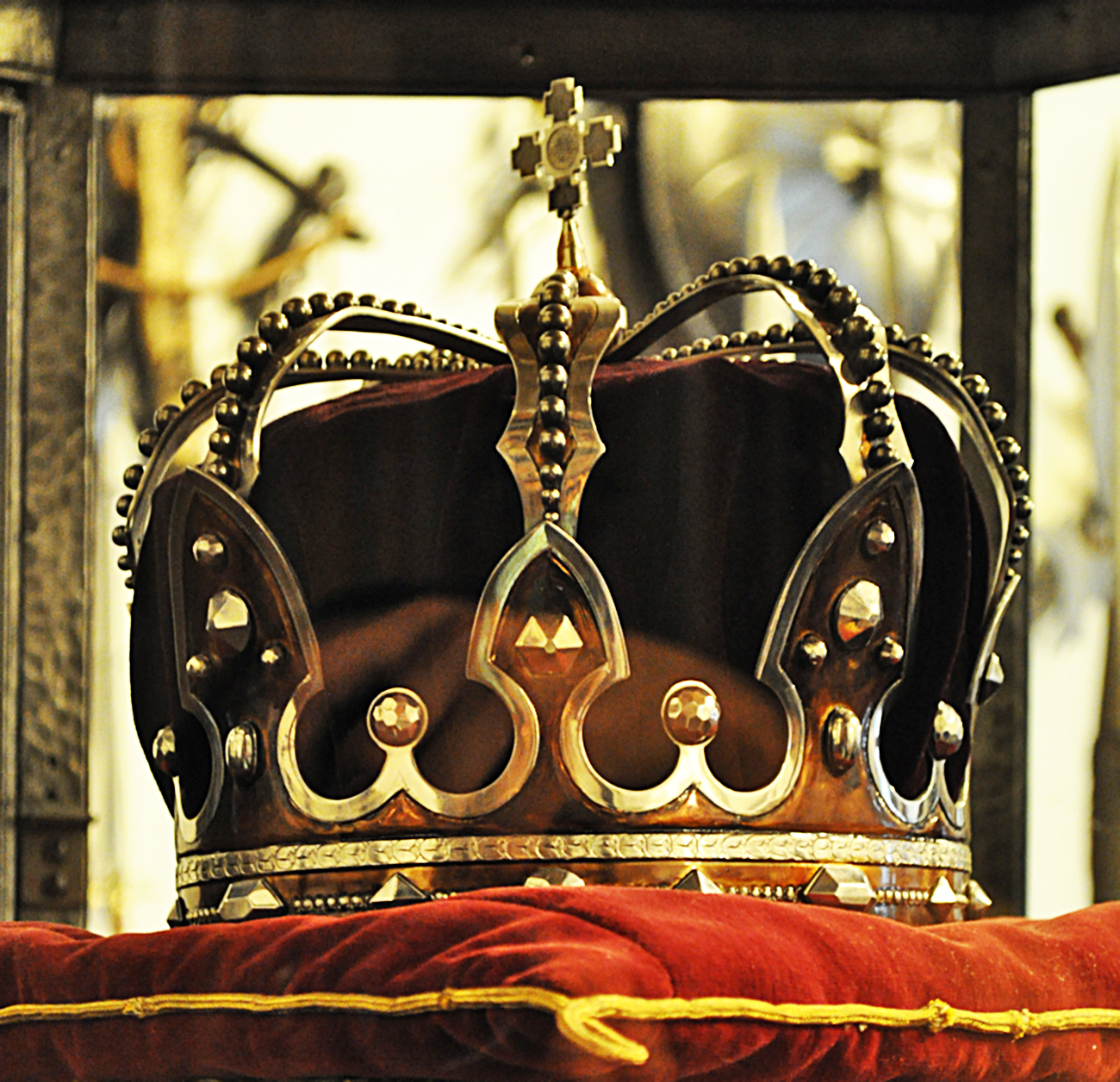
The Crown

The Steel Crown of Romania is the coronation crown and principal symbol of the deposed Romanian monarchy. The crown was forged at the Army Arsenal (Arsenalul Armatei) in Bucharest from the steel of a cannon captured by the Romanian Army from the Ottomans during its War of Independence.

Carol I, the first king of Romania, chose steel, and not gold, to symbolize the bravery of the Romanian soldiers. He received it during the ceremonies of his coronation and of the proclamation of Romania as a kingdom in 1881. It is the same Crown used in 1922 at the coronation of King Ferdinand I and Queen Maria as sovereigns of Romania, which took place in Alba-Iulia. The Crown was used also during the coronation and anointing as King of Michael I by the Orthodox Patriarch of Romania, Nicodim Munteanu, in the Patriarchal Cathedral of Bucharest, on the very day of his second accession, 6 September 1940.

The coat of arms of Romania was augmented on 11 July 2016 to add a representation of the Steel Crown.

A copy of the crown was placed on the coffin of the last king of Romania, Michael I, during his funeral in December 2017.

== Image gallery ==
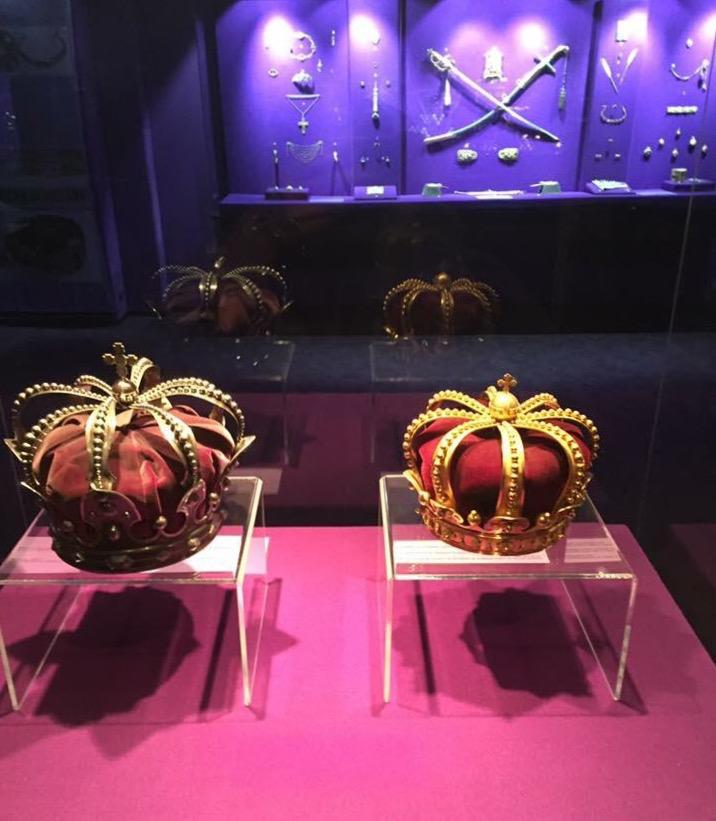

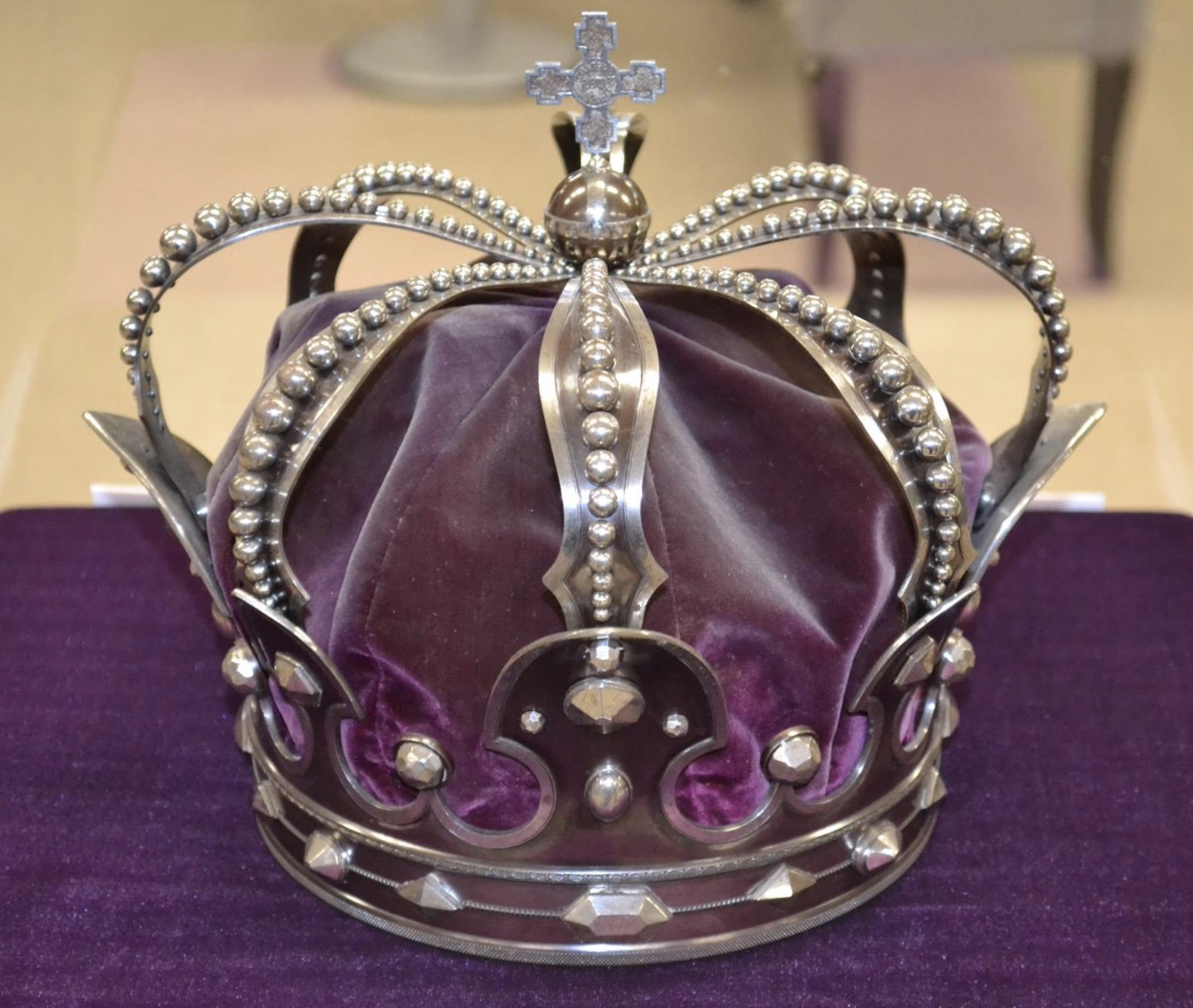

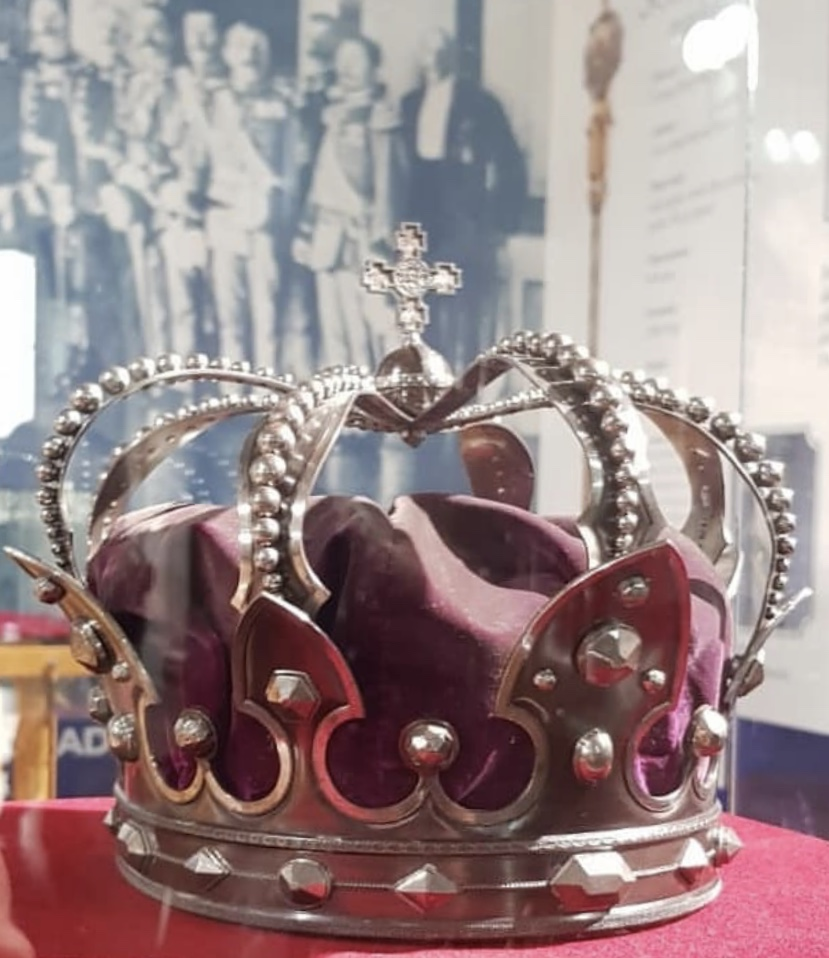
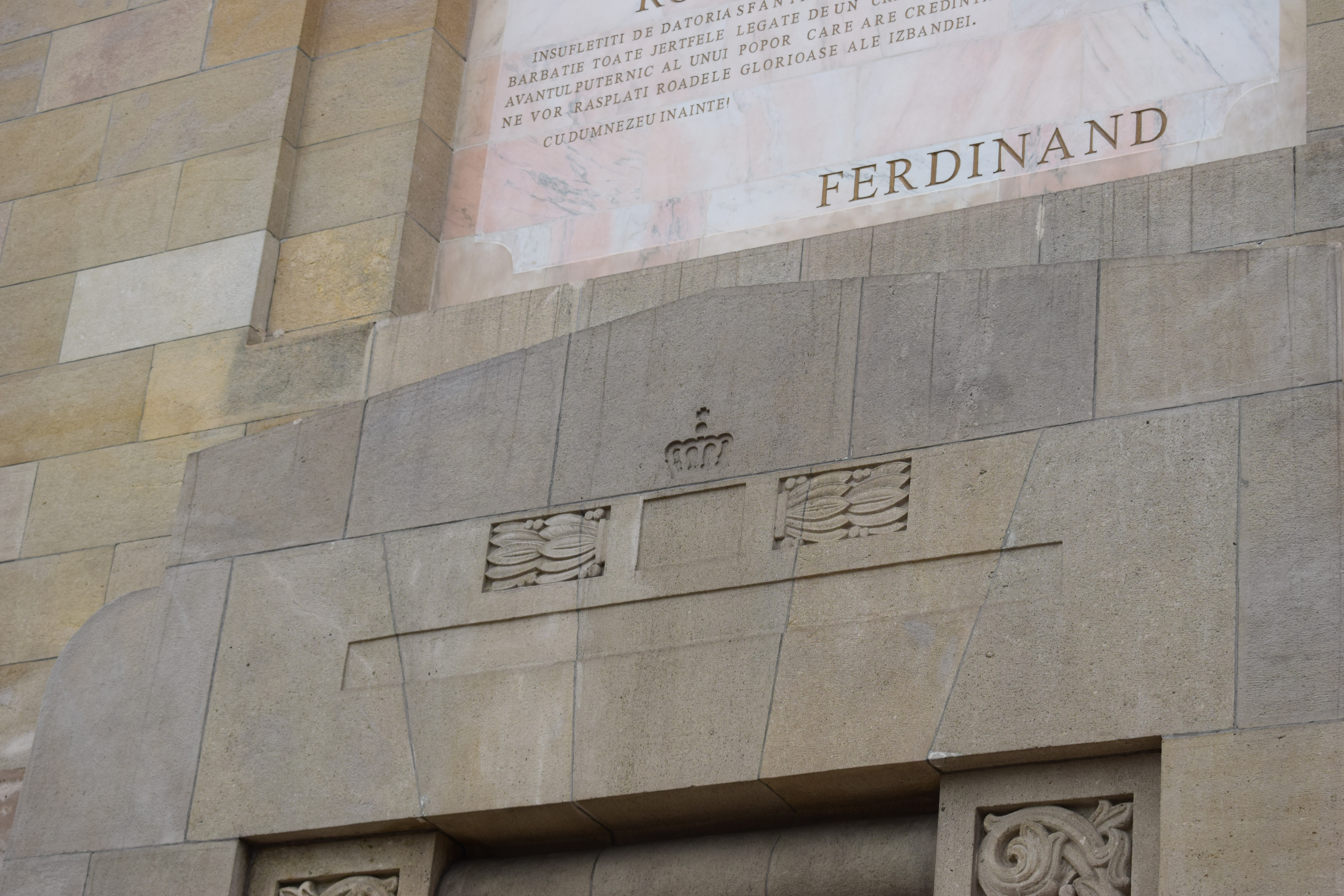
The symbol of the Royal Crown (the Romanian "Steel Crown"), depicted on the eastern façade of the Triumphal Arch ("Arcul de Triumf") in Bucharest.

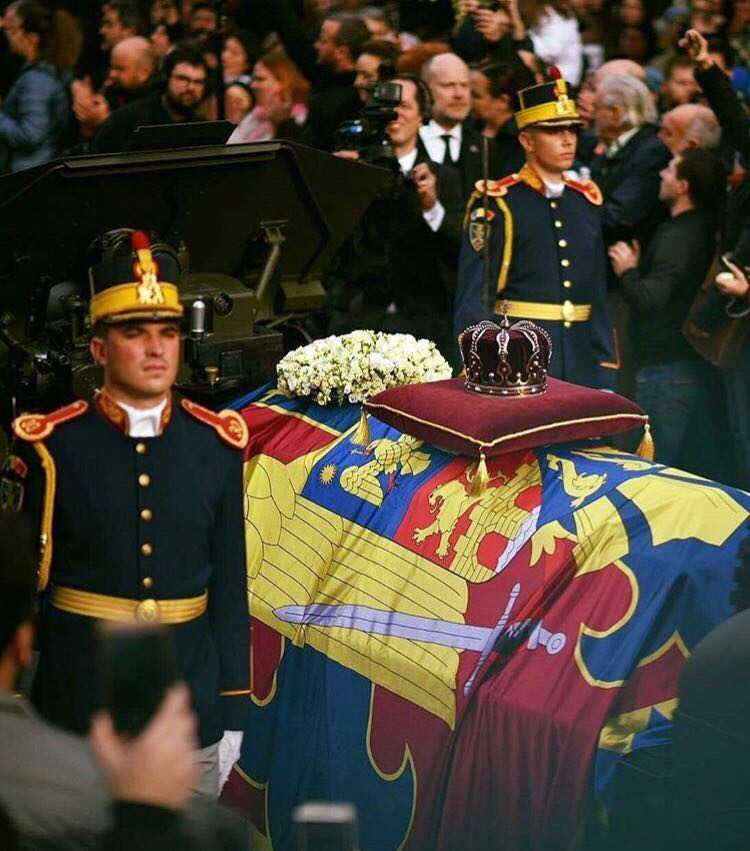
The funeral of King Michael I of Romania in December 2017, with a copy of the crown on the coffin.

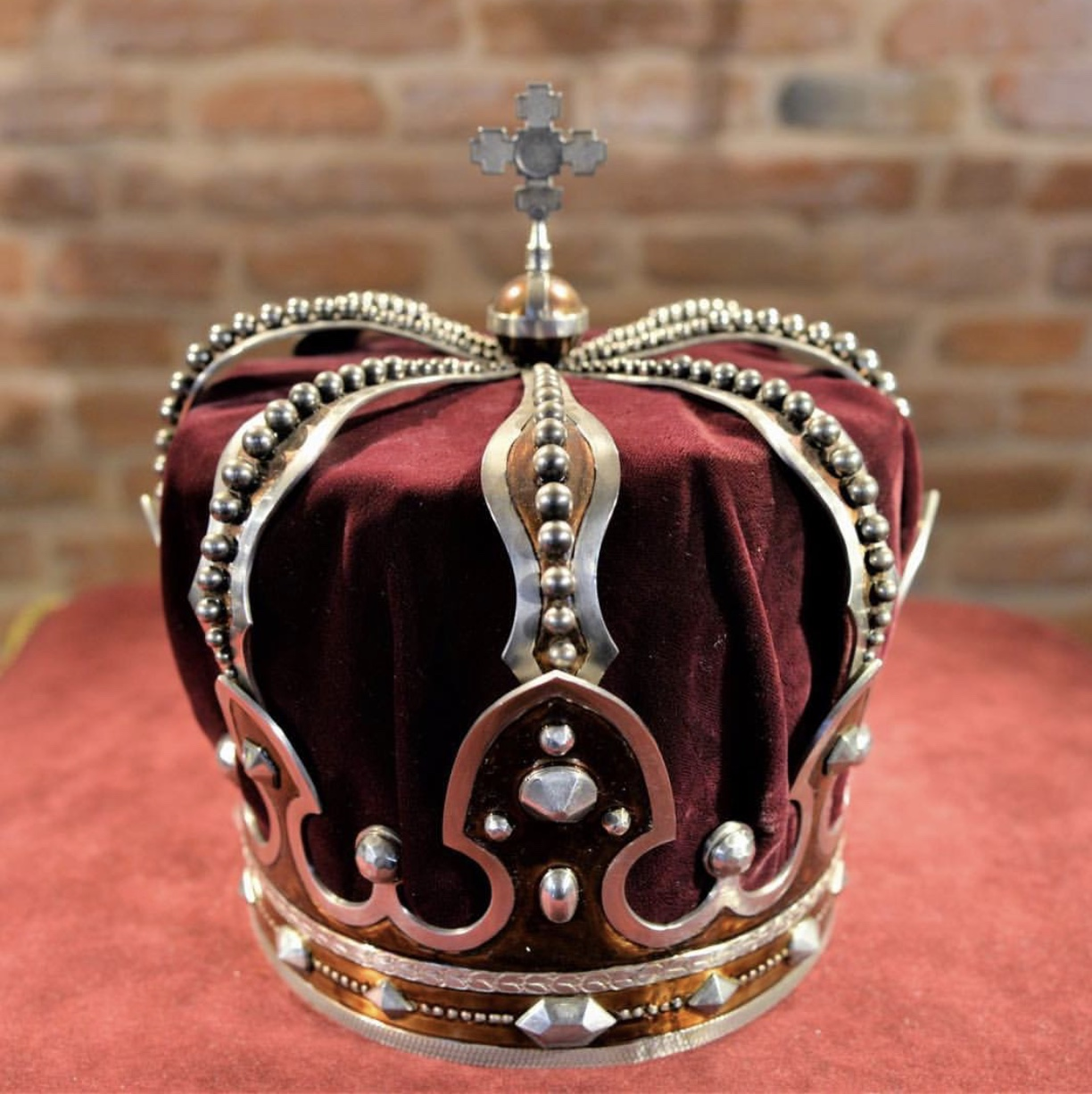
The funeral crown made for King Michael I

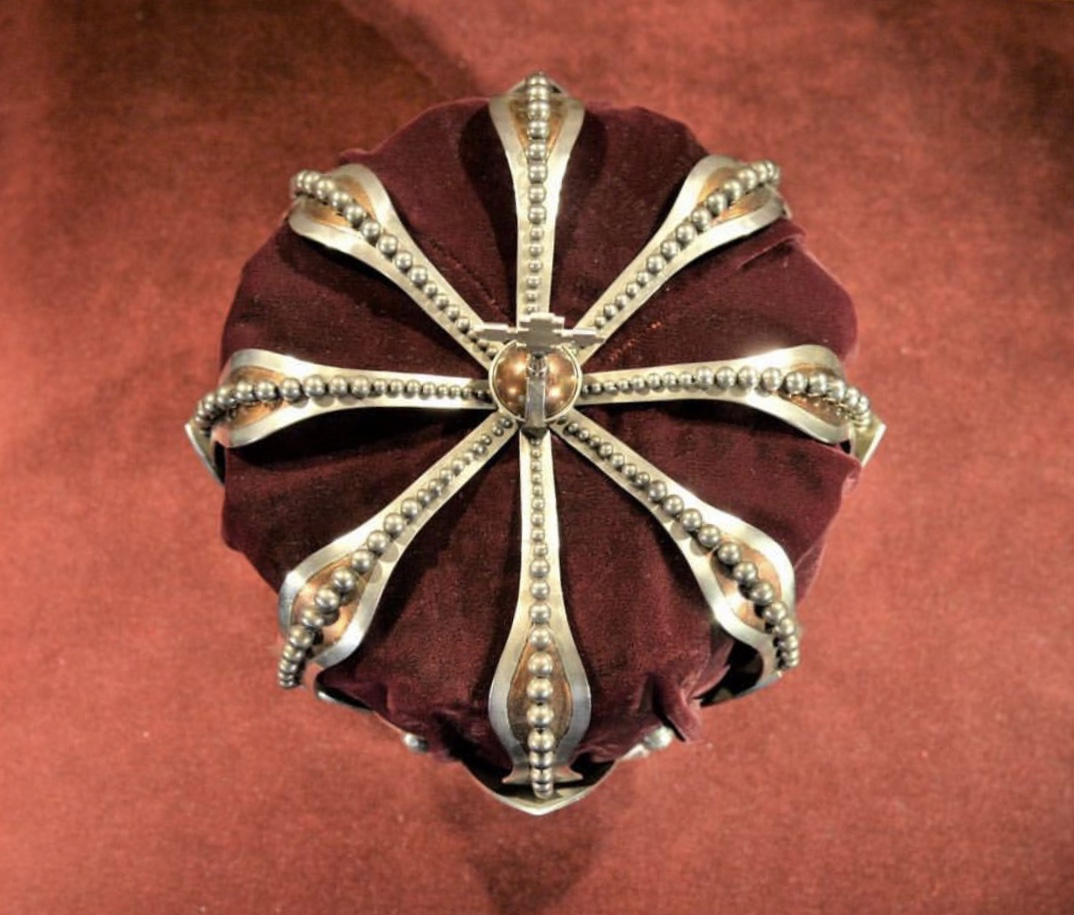

The coat of arms of Romania, which features the crown
