= Flag of Romania =

Romania
- Tricolorul
- Use: National flag and ensign
- Proportion: 2:3
- Adopted: 1834; 14 June 1848; 1 July 1866; 27 December 1989 (standardized 1995, updated 19 June 2023)
- Design: A vertical tricolor of blue, yellow, and red

The national flag of Romania (Romanian: drapelul național al României) is a tricolor featuring three equal vertical bands colored blue (at the flagpole), yellow, and red, with a width-to-length ratio of 2:3.

The current version was adopted in 1989 in the wake of the Romanian Revolution and is defined in the Constitution of Romania as well as by organic law 75/1994, plus several later clarifications. Starting in 2023, the law provides exact color shades for print and digital purposes.

The colors have been used individually or in pairs on official insignia and symbols since the 14th century, but were first officially combined on a flag in the 19th century. Although the flag has seen several variations over the years, its overall design has remained consistent, maintaining the same colors and a similar arrangement of the bands.

== Legal framework and specifications ==
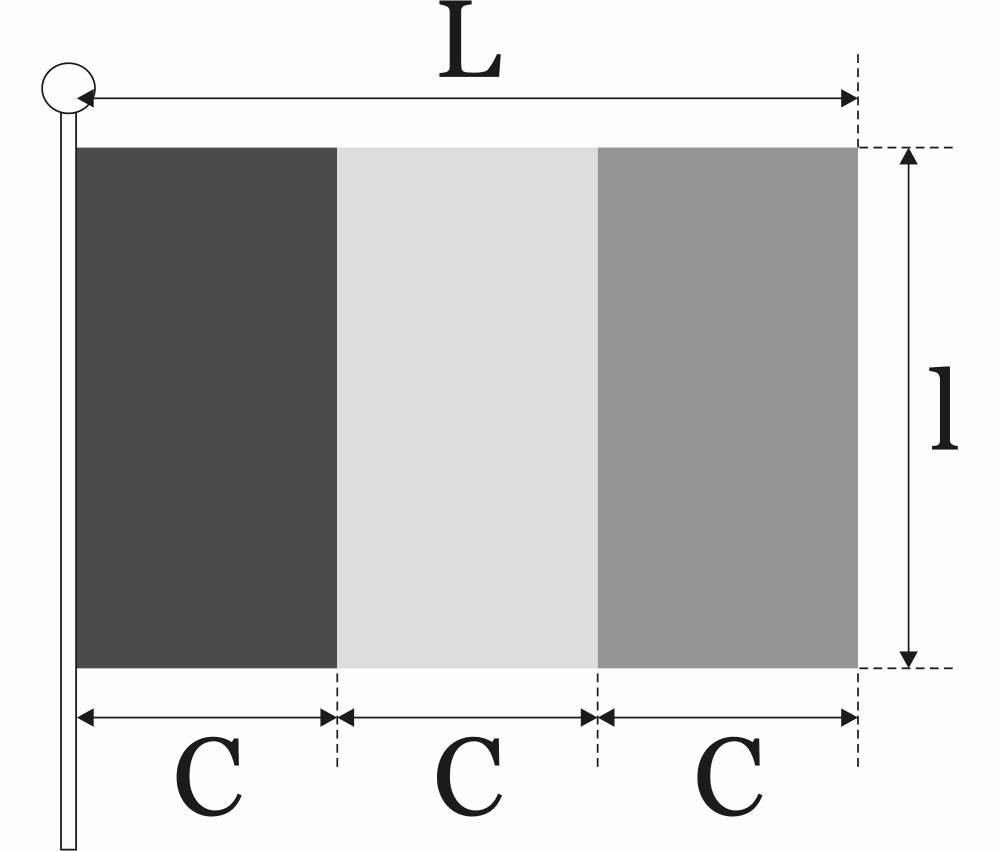
Specifications for the flag of Romania l = 2/3 L; C = 1/3 L

Law no. 75/1994 specifies that the flag height is 2/3 of the width and that the color stripes are of equal size with blue at the hoist.

Prior to 2023, the law specified the colors using the cobalt blue, chrome yellow and vermilion red pigments, but did not go into further detail.

In the 2023 revision of the law, the pigments were replaced with exact color shades in the Pantone, CMYK, and RGB color models.

(1867–present)	Blue	Yellow	Red
Pantone	280c	116c	186c
CMYK	100-70-0-10	0-10-95-0	0-90-80-5
RGB	0-43-127	252-209-22	206-17-38
Hexadecimal	#002B7F	#FCD116	#CE1126

== History and significance of the colors ==
=== Early use of the colors ===
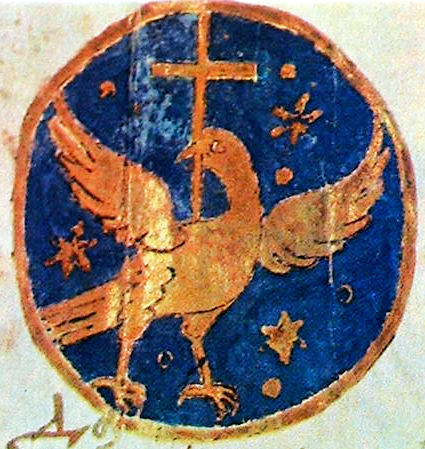
Coat of arms of Wallachia during Radu Șerban's rule

The colors blue, yellow and red are documented on flags and coats of arms in Romanian-inhabited lands as far back as the 14th century.

They were extensively used on the coat of arms and flags of the Moldavian Principality. Some examples include a gonfalon of Dragoș Vodă, flags used by Stephen the Great and Petru Rareș, army flags used during the reign of Ieremia Movilă, voivodal flags of Michael the Brave, Alexandru Ipsilanti, Alexandru Suțu, Mihai Sturdza, Alexandru Ghica.

Upon creating a "Grand Principality of Transylvania" on 2 November 1765, Maria Theresa changed the Transylvanian coat of arms to a design that used red, yellow and blue.

Many Wallachian rulers such as Michael the Brave, Basarab I, Radu Șerban, Mihnea III, Matei Basarab, Scarlat Ghica, Alexandros Soutzos, John George Caradja used coats of arms and flags or ensigns in blue, yellow or red.

Contemporary descriptions and later reconstructions indicate that the flag of Wallachia during Michael the Brave's reign was made of damask, originally yellow-white but later faded to white. It featured a black eagle on a green juniper branch, with a cross in its beak.

During the 1970s and 1980s, with protochronism receiving official endorsement, it was claimed that red, yellow and blue were found on 16th-century royal grants issued by Michael the Brave, as well as on his shields and banners.

=== First use of the colors for self-determination ===
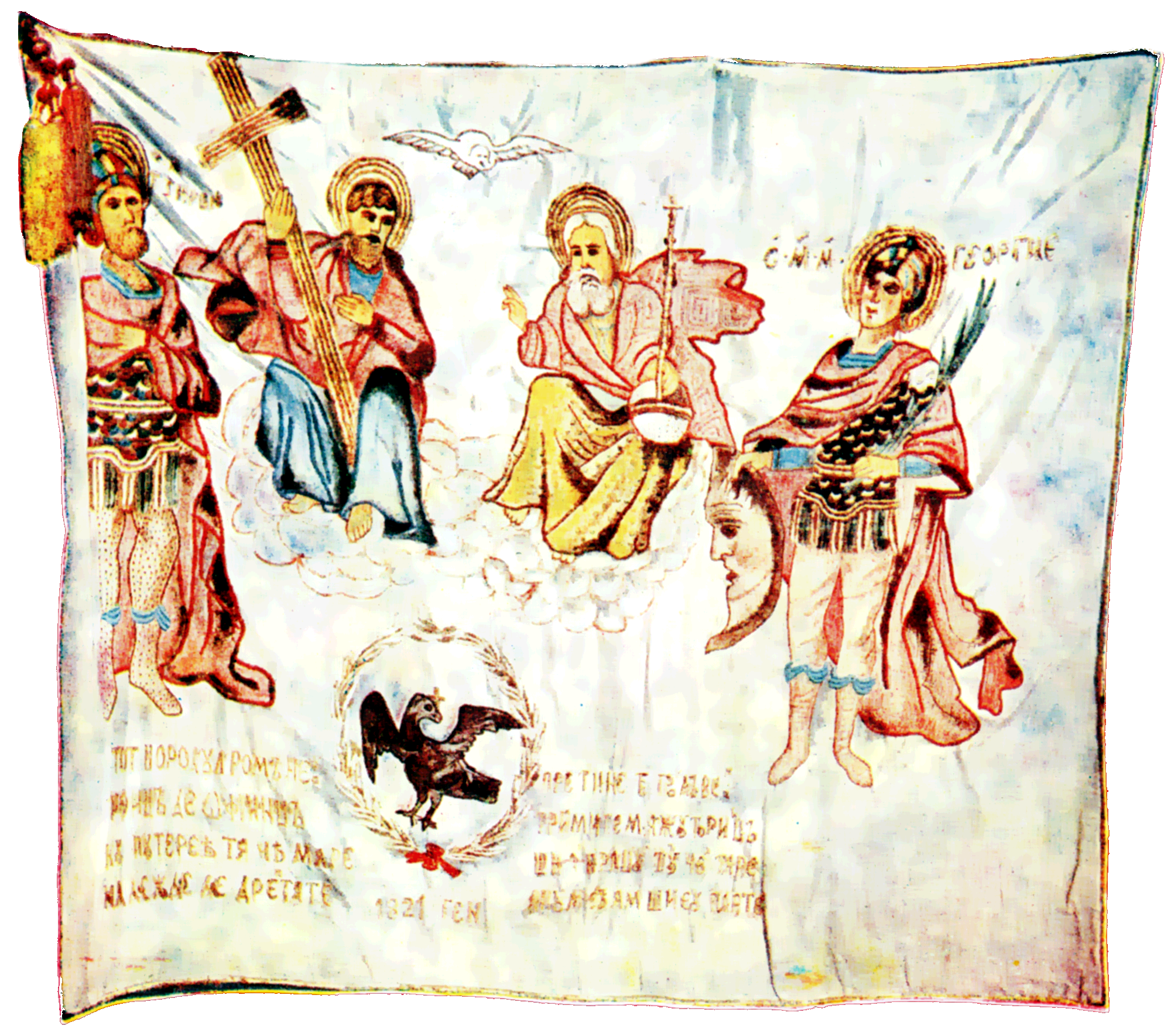
Flag of the Wallachian uprising of 1821

During the Wallachian uprising of 1821, Tudor Vladimirescu commissioned a revolutionary flag depicting the New Testament Holy Trinity, Saint George, Saint Tiron and the Wallachian eagle. The blue, yellow and red are present on the vestments of the saints as well as three tassels attached to the pole.

Historiographers consider this one of the earliest instances of the three colors being used deliberately together in the context of Romanian self-determination, with the meaning "Liberty (sky-blue), Justice (field yellow), Fraternity (blood red)".

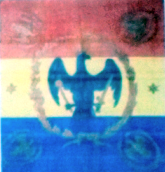
War flag of the Principality of Wallachia (1834)

The first documented use of a tricolour took place in Wallachia in 1834, when the reforming domnitor Alexandru II Ghica submitted naval and military flag designs for the approval of Sultan Mahmud II. Included among them was a "flag with a red, blue and yellow face, also having stars and a bird's head in the middle". Soon, the order of colors was changed, with yellow appearing in the center.

=== The 1848 Revolution ===
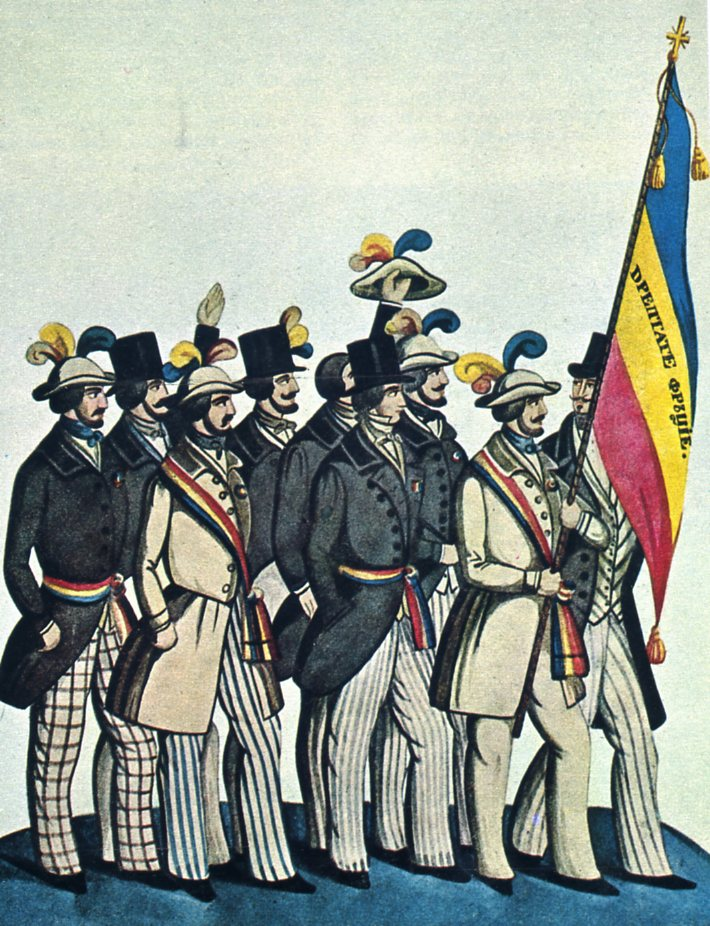
Early 1848 tricolor inscribed "Dreptate, Frăție": watercolor by C. Petrescu

In April 1848, the flag adopted by the revolutionaries was initially a blue-yellow-red tricolor (with blue above, in line with the meaning "Liberty, Justice, Fraternity"). Already on 26 April, according to Gazeta de Transilvania, Romanian students in Paris were hailing the new government with a blue, gold and red flag, "as a symbol of union between Moldavians and Muntenians".

Decree no. 1 of 14/26 June 1848 of the provisional government mentioned that "the National Flag will bear three colours: blue, yellow, red", emblazoned with the words "DPEПTATE ФPЪЦIE" (Dreptate, Frăție or "Justice, Fraternity"). It differed from earlier tricolors in that the blue stripe was on top, the princely monogram was eliminated from the corners, as was the crown atop the eagle at the end of the flagpole, while a motto was now present.

Later on, Decree no. 252 of 13/25 July 1848, issued specifically because "it has not been understood [yet] how the national flags should be designed", defined the flag as three vertical stripes, possibly influenced by the French model. The shades were "dark blue, light yellow and carmine red"; as for order, "near the wood comes blue, then yellow and then red fluttering".

St. Luke's Church, built in 1782–1791 in Sibiu, hosts a Romanian flag with vertical stripes that was flown at the national assemblies at Blaj on Câmpia Libertății during the Revolution. The flag's colours and the icon painted in the centre have faded. The flag was hidden in order to avoid being taken or destroyed by the Communist regime and subsequently lost, then rediscovered in 2014.

Flag of the 1848 provisional government

Petre Vasiliu-Năsturel observes that from a heraldic point of view, on the French as well as the revolutionary Wallachian flag, the middle stripe represents a heraldic metal (argent and or respectively), thus, the two flags could be related. Other historians believe that the tricolour was not an imitation of the French flag, instead embodying an old Romanian tradition. This theory is supported by a note from the revolutionary minister of foreign affairs to Emin Pasha: "the colors of the band that we, the leaders, wear, as well as all our followers, are not of modern origin. We have had our flags since an earlier time. When we received the tricolor insignia and bands we did not follow the spirit of imitation or fashion". The same minister assured the extraordinary envoy of the Porte, Suleiman Pasha, that the flag's three colours had existed "for a long time; our ancestors bore them on their standard and their flags. So they are not a borrowing or an imitation from the present or a threat for the future".

After the revolution was quelled, the old flags were restored and the revolutionaries punished for having worn the tricolor.

=== United Principalities of Romania ===
Flag of the United Principalities of Moldavia and Wallachia (1859–1862)

Flag of the United Principalities of Romania (1862–1866)

From 1859 until 1866, the United Principalities of Wallachia and Moldavia had a red-yellow-blue Romanian tricolor, with horizontal stripes, as national flag.

The flag was described in Almanahul român din 1866 as: "a tricolor flag, divided in three stripes, red, yellow and blue and laid out horizontally: red above, blue below and yellow in the middle".

Although the Ottoman Empire did not allow the United Principalities to have their own symbols, the new flag gained a degree of international recognition. Relating prince Cuza's May–June 1864 journey to Constantinople, doctor Carol Davila observed: "The Romanian flag was raised on the great mast, the Sultan's kayaks awaited us, the guard was armed, the Grand Vizier at the door... The Prince, quiet, dignified, concise in his speech, spent 20 minutes with the Sultan, who then came to review us... Once again, the Grand Vizier led the Prince to the main gate and we returned to the Europe Palace, the Romanian flag still fluttering on the mast...".

Flag of Romania (1867–1948)

Article 124 of the 1866 Constitution of Romania provided that "the colors of the United Principalities will be Blue, Yellow and Red". The order and placement of the colors were decided by the Assembly of Deputies in its session of 26 March 1867. Thus, following a proposal by Nicolae Golescu, they were placed just as in 1848: vertically and in the following order: blue hoist, yellow in the middle and red fly.

The country's coat of arms was placed only on army and princely flags, in the center; civilian flags remained without a coat of arms. The same distinction was made between flags of the Navy and those of the civil and merchant ships.

The rapporteur Mihail Kogălniceanu, who also conveyed the opinion of Cezar Bolliac, Dimitrie Brătianu, Constantin Grigorescu, Ion Leca, Nicolae Golescu and Gheorghe Grigore Cantacuzino, said: "The tricolor flag as it is today is not (as the minister claims) the flag of the United Principalities. It is much more: it is itself the flag of the Romanian nation in all lands inhabited by Romanians".

The "Law for modifying the country's arms" of 11/23 March 1872 did not change these provisions, only the design of the coat of arms.

=== Socialist and Communist era ===
State flag of the Socialist Republic of Romania (1965–1989)

On 30 December 1947 Romania was proclaimed a socialist people's republic and all symbols of the former kingdom were outlawed, including the royal coat of arms and the tricolor flags that showed it.

The flag retained its colors and characteristics, the only difference being that it now included a redesigned coat of arms placed in the middle on the gold band, featuring industrial and agricultural symbolism. It was also during this era that the 2:3 proportion was regulated by law for the first time.

The national anthem between 1977 and 1990 was a modified version of a patriotic song that gave the color meanings as "heart's fire" (red), "golden future" (yellow) and "faith" (blue), but the Communist version stripped the original references and left only "red, yellow and blue".

Shown here is the last and most long-lived version of the flag, which was in use for 24 years.

=== The 1989 Revolution ===
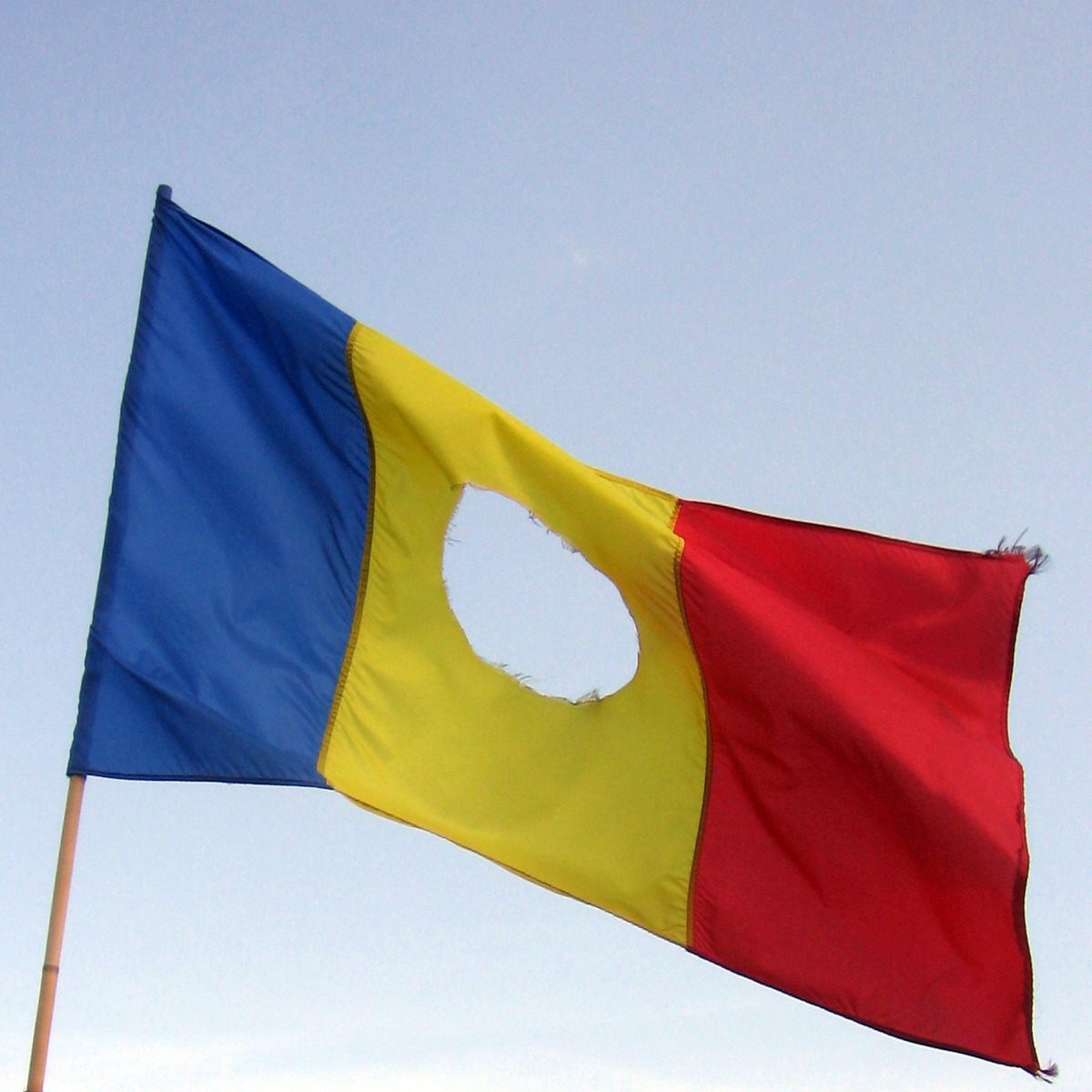
Flag with the coat of arms cut out

On 20 December 1989, during the revolution at Timișoara, the protesters were waving flags with the Communist coat of arms cut out of the middle.

The coat of arms in use at the time was perceived as a symbol of Nicolae Ceaușescu's dictatorship and of the Communist era. These flags were called "the flag with the hole" (drapelul cu gaură).

Such flags continue to be seen occasionally during contemporary mass protests, particularly those conducted in reaction to Government misconduct.

The Communist flag would officially be replaced in the immediate wake of the Revolution, on 27 December 1989, by the National Salvation Front with the 1867 version of the simple tricolor, which remains in use today.

== Gallery of historical flags ==
Flag of Wallachia (1593–1611)

Flag of Wallachia (1831–1848)

Flag of the Wallachian Revolution (1848)

Flag of Wallachia (1849–1862)

Flag of Moldavia (14th–15th cent.)

Flag of Moldavia (1831–1862)

Flag of the United Principalities of Moldavia and Wallachia (1859–1862)

Flag of the Romanian United Principalities (1862–1866)

Flag of the Principality of Romania (1866–1881)

Kingdom of Romania (1881–1947)

Flag of the Romanian People's Republic (January–March 1948)

Flag of the Romanian People's Republic (1948–1952)

Flag of the Romanian People's Republic (1952–1965)

Flag of the Socialist Republic of Romania (1965–1989)

Flag of the Romanian Revolution (1989)

Flag of Romania (1989–present)

== Flag protocol ==
=== Legislation ===
Law no. 75/1994 establishes the protocol for the flag of Romania. Its provisions are extended by the Governmental Decision no. 1157/2001 which approves the Regulations regarding the display of the Romanian flag, the singing of the national anthem and the use of insignia containing the Romanian coat of arms. Protocol for military flags and standards is fixed by internal regulation. The law contains the following provisions:

- The flag of Romania may be raised by individuals at their domicile or residence, or by legal entities at their headquarters.
- The flag of Romania is always to be hoisted on the buildings and in the headquarters of public authorities and institutions, at the headquarters of political parties, unions, of educational and cultural institutions, on border crossings and in international airports. As ensign, it is permanently hoisted on ships of any kind and other vessels that navigate under the Romanian flag. According to customary protocol, the flag of Romania is hoisted at the headquarters of diplomatic missions and consular offices of Romania, as well as at the residences of the chiefs of diplomatic missions and consular offices. Likewise, the flag of Romania is used as a standard on vehicles transporting chiefs of Romanian diplomatic missions and consular offices, in their official travels, according to the same customs.

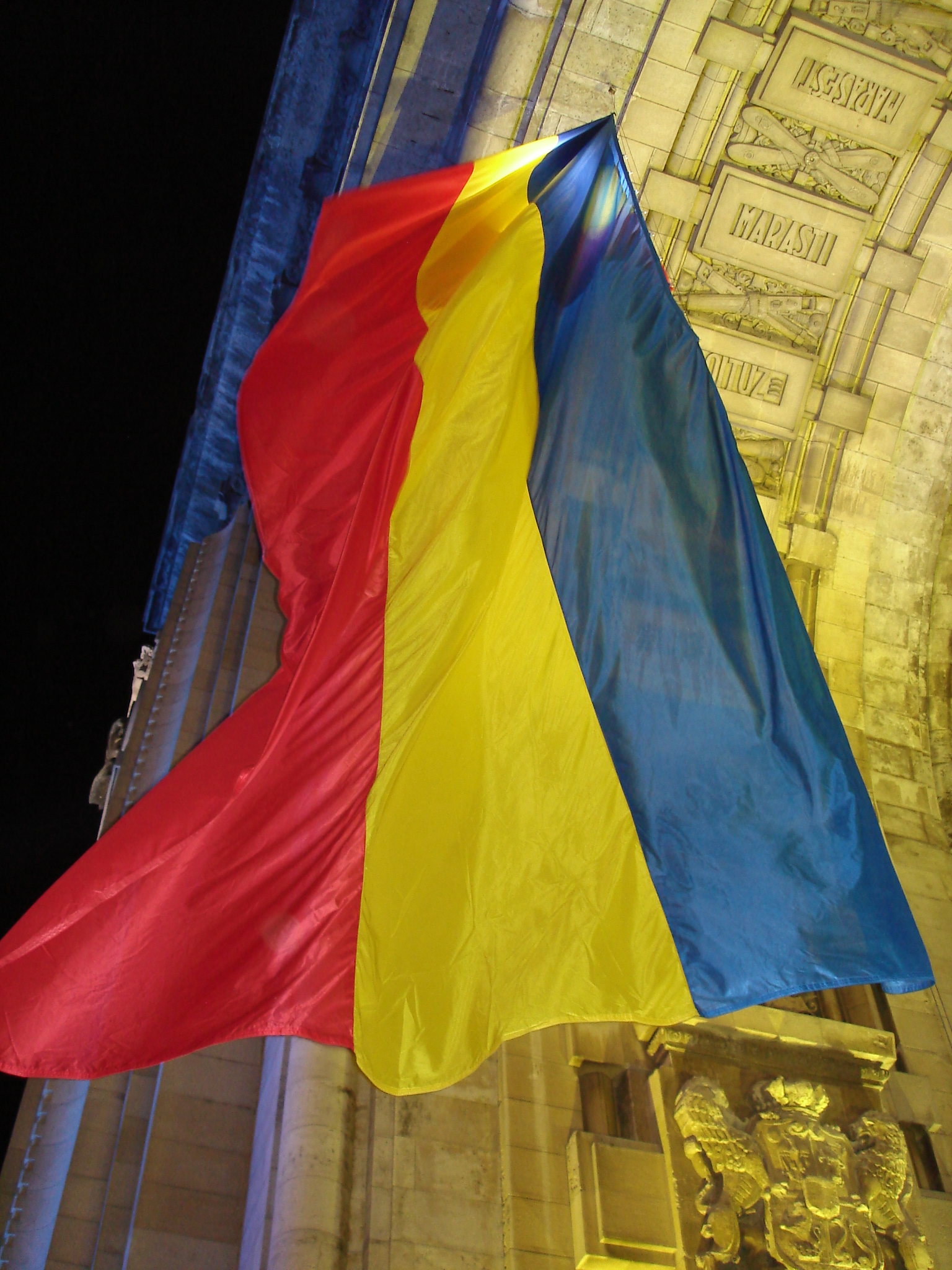
Flag hoisted on the Triumphal Arch, Bucharest

- Temporarily, on the national day of Romania and other national holidays, the flag of Romania may be hoisted in public places decided upon by the local authorities; and for official festivals and ceremonies with a local, national and international character, in the locations where these take place. Likewise, it must be raised for official visits undertaken in Romania by heads of state and of government, as well as by high political personalities representing the principal international intergovernmental bodies, at airports, rail stations, ports and on their various routes. The flag is also hoisted at sporting competitions, at stadiums and other sporting grounds, and during election campaigns, at the headquarters of electoral commissions and polling stations. During military ceremonies, the flag is hoisted according to military regulations.
- During national mourning, all public authorities and institutions are required to fly the flag at their posts. The same obligation also applies to individuals if they have flown the flag at their residence. The government is the only official body that fixes days of national mourning, on which the flag of Romania is lowered at half-staff.
- The flags of other states may be hoisted on Romanian territory only together with the national flag and only on the occasion of visits with an official state character, international festivities and meetings, on official buildings and in public places specified in Law no. 75/1994. In such cases, the flag of Romania is hoisted in the place of honor, that is in the center, if the number of flags is odd, or to the right of the flag (viewed from the front of the flags) with which it occupies the center if the number of flags is even. In such cases, all flags must have the same dimensions (but not proportions, which are fixed by each respective country). The flag of Europe will be raised to the right of the flag of Romania if only two flags are being flown.
- The raising of the flag of Romania at events that take place under the aegis of international organizations is done according to international regulations and customs.

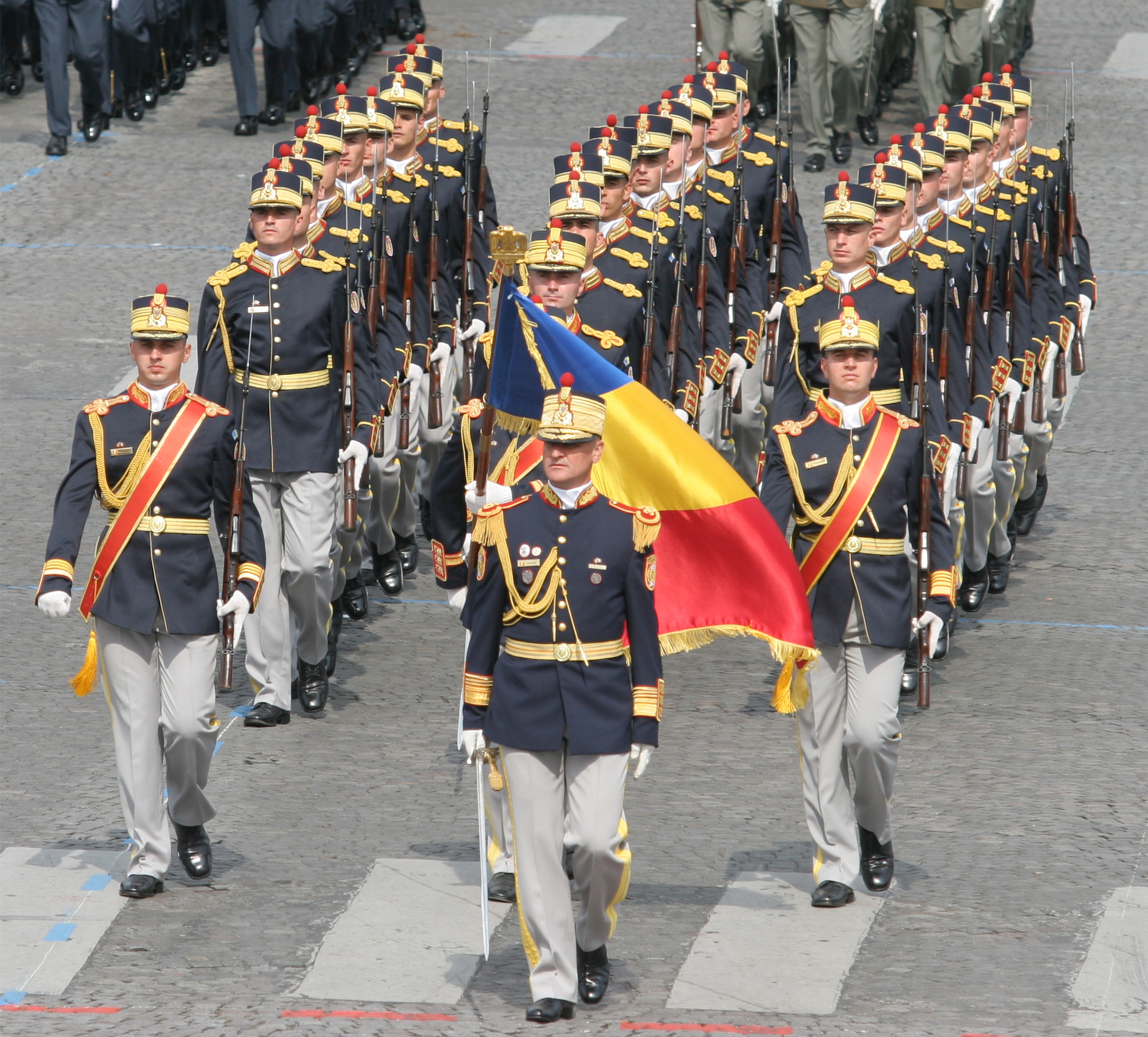
Military colors without coat of arms and weapon signs in the corners. During the march, the color bearer salutes by bowing the military colors at 45 degrees, regardless of the person. Soldiers depicted here are from the Mihai Viteazul 30th Honor Guard Regiment, participating in the 2007 Bastille Day Military Parade in Paris.

- The military colors are removed from its display case for the solemn occasion of its presentation, at the ceremony for taking the military oath, at parades of troops and reviews on the front, at the giving or taking of command by the respective unit, at the granting of military honors during military funerals, or on other occasions if required.
- When in formation and standing, the color bearer keeps the military colors near his foot, holding his right hand down on the rod and his left hand on the rod, at his chest level. The rod's low end must be in front of his right foot. When saluting from this position, the military colors are bowed at horizontal for the Romanian president and other heads of state and at 45 degrees for the other civil and military staff. When marching, the color bearer holds the military colors vertically. If the unit is walking more than 100 m, the rod is introduced inside the scarf's muff. When traveling by vehicle, the color bearer with the military color stands inside the unit commander's car. During the march, the color bearer salutes by bowing the military colors at 45 degrees, regardless of the person. When two military units cross each other (either one or both of them are marching in formation) the military colors are bowed for salute at 45 degrees. In case of raining, snowing or strong winds, the military colors are protected by a transparent plastic cover.
- The ensign of a Navy vessel must be raised daily on the stern flagpole at 8 a.m., and on holidays at 9 a.m. If the vessel is in motion, the ensign remains raised permanently where the boom meets the mast. Usually, the hoisting of a vessel's ensign takes place in the presence of the entire crew, which is not the case at the lowering, daily at sunset.

=== Penalties ===
The Governmental Decision no. 1157/2001 details the rules of hoisting the flag of Romania. The hoisting of a Romanian flag of another shape, dimension, model or color than those regulated by law, or having an improper condition, is a violation and is punishable with a fine of between 500 and 1500 lei (US$120–362). Not raising the national flag by public authorities and institutions, or in the mandatory situations stated by the law, the improper hoisting of the flag and the hoisting of the flag of another country outside the situations regulated by law, or with improper dimensions, is a violation and is punishable with a fine of between 2500 and 5000 lei (US$604–1,208). In June 2023, Law 75/1994 was supplemented in art. 1, paragraph 3 with the provision that "No other inscriptions and symbols may be added to the Romanian flag other than those approved by law or military regulations." Such contraventions are punishable with a fine of 10,000–20,000 lei (US$2306–4612).

The violations are ascertained and sanctioned by mandataries of the minister of public administration, by the prefect or his mandataries, and are applied to the director of the public authority or institution, to the mayor, to the president of the county's council, or to the private individual or juridical person that committed the violations.

Until 2011, article 236 of the Penal Code of Romania stated that any display of contempt against the symbols of Romania was punishable by detention between 6 months and 3 years in prison. Article 344 of the same Penal Code provided that, in times of war, lowering the vessel's ensign during a battle in order to serve the enemy's cause is punishable by life in prison or detention between 15 and 25 years in prison and civil penalties. A new penal code adopted that year eliminates the provisions of article 236 and reduces the punishment provided by article 344 (renamed article 420) to between 10 and 20 years' imprisonment coupled with civil penalties.

== Flag Day ==
Law no. 96 of 20 May 1998 proclaimed 26 June as the Day of the National Flag of Romania. It was on this day in 1848 that Decree no. 1 of the Wallachian Provisional Government was issued, making the red-yellow-blue tricolor the national flag.

On Flag Day, public authorities and other state institutions are obliged by law to organize cultural/educational programs and events, with a patriotic or scientific character, devoted to Romanian history, as well as specific military ceremonies, organized within units of the Ministry of National Defense and the Ministry of the Internal Affairs.

== Similar flags ==
The state flag of Chad is extremely similar, to the point it has caused some amount of international discussion. While they are similar in colour, their tricolours came about independently of each other; the same goes for Moldova and Andorra's flags. In 2004, Chad asked the United Nations to examine the issue. Then-president of Romania Ion Iliescu announced that there would be no changes to the flag. Romania's foreign affairs ministry said they are unaware of any claims being filed within 12-month deadline of Romania's registration of the flag in 1997.

The flag of Moldova is inspired by the Romanian tricolour except that it has a 1:2 ratio, slightly different colors and the Moldovan coat of arms in the middle.

The flag of Andorra also has the same tricolour as the flag of Romania.

Flag of Chad

Flag of Moldova

Flag of Andorra

Flag of the Soka Gakkai

== Other official flags of Romania ==
=== Governmental flags ===
Flag of the president of Romania

The publication Album des pavillons nationaux et des marques distinctives (2000) indicates that the flag of the president of Romania is a square tricolor with a white edge and a blue border. It is decorated on all sides with fringes of golden thread and, in the corners, tassels of the same material. The flag of the prime minister is similar to that of the president, except that its border is yellow and it lacks fringes and tassels. The flag of the minister of national defense is almost identical to its interwar predecessor, being a square tricolor with the letter M written in white in the middle of the blue stripe. The Pilot ensign represents the national flag with a thick white border.

=== Military colours and ensigns ===
According to the Romanian General Staff, "The military colours are the symbol of military honour, bravery and glory. They evoke the past struggle of the Romanian people for national liberty and the traditions of unity, reminding each soldier of his sacred duty to serve the Fatherland with trust, and to defend at all costs the unity, sovereignty and independence of Romania".

The military colours are granted to military units by presidential decree, on the advice of the minister of national defence, the minister of internal affairs or the director of the Romanian Intelligence Service. According to the Ministry of National Defence, the complete description of this military insignia is as follows:

Military colours. Air Force design.

Military colours. Land Forces design.

Military colours. Naval Forces design.

The military colours of Romania are made of double silk cloth and have dimensions of 100 × 66 cm (2:3 ratio). The canvas has the colours of the Romanian flag and its obverse is identical with the reverse. The national coat of arms, measuring 29 × 21.5 cm, is applied in the middle of the yellow stripe, 18 cm above its base. In each corner, 5 cm from the edge of the canvas, is sewn a wreath of oak leaves, which surrounds the weapon signs, all of golden thread:

- two crossed lands for land forces
- a helicopter blade juxtaposed over a pair of paper in downward flight, a radar and a crossed rocket and telescope for aerial forces
- an anchor for naval forces.
- a serpent for the medical units (military hospitals)
- the letter J in a rhombus over two crossed swords for gendarmerie units
- the emblem of the Romanian Intelligence Service for its units

The three sides of the flag not attached to the pole are decorated with fringes of golden thread (5–7 cm long) and tassels of the same material (10–12 cm long) hang from the corners of the fly. The flag is attached to the pole by an antioxidant metal rod 70 cm long.

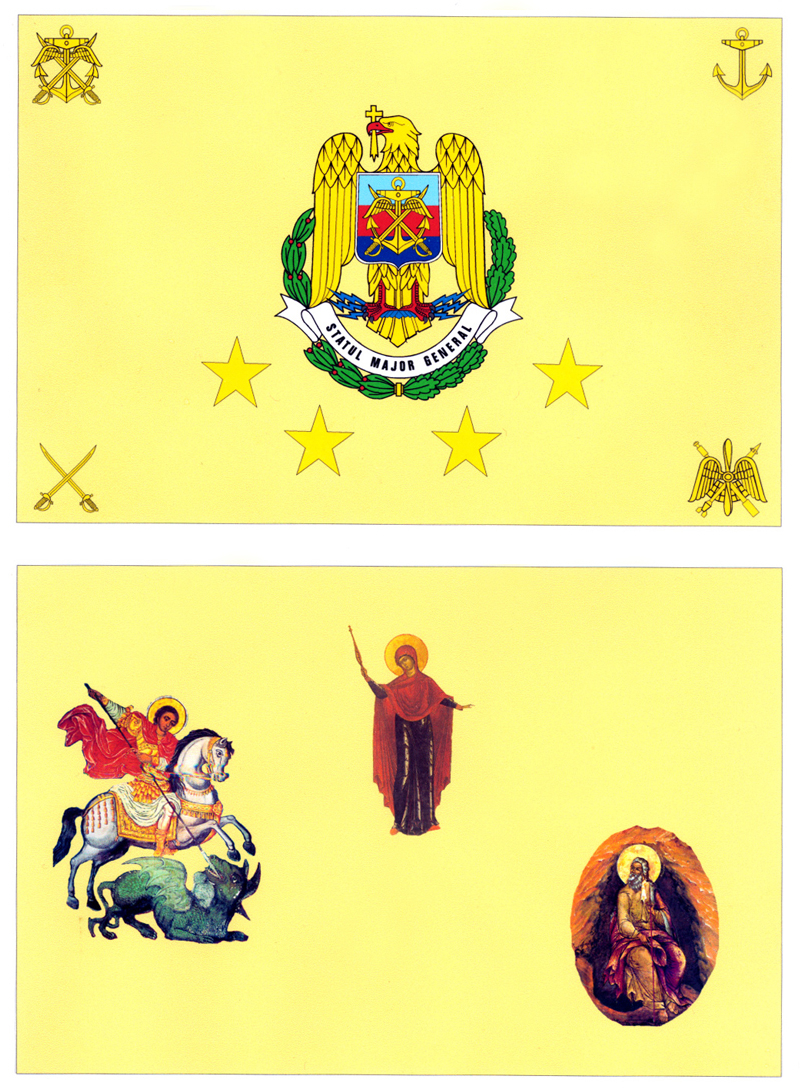
The identifying flag of the Romanian General Staff (obverse and reverse)

The pole, of brown wood, is 240 cm high and 3.5 cm in diameter. A brass cylinder is at the base, 4 cm long and closed on the bottom. The rod is attached to the pole by a brass ring, gilt on its lower part, and a 6 cm high cylindrical protective tube of the same material and gilt on its upper part. The ring (3.2 cm high) is inscribed with the name of the unit. Another brass cylinder is placed on the tip of the pole, 6 cm long and of brass. The eagle, of gilt copper, sheet, 15 cm high and 11.5 cm wide, is placed over this. Looking rightward, the eagle's wings are pointed downward and it holds the thunderbolts of Jupiter in its talons. It is placed on a parallelepipedic support of the same metal (10 × 3.5 × 2 cm), which has a 3.4 cm high ornament on its lower part. The support is screwed onto the brass cylinder and has inscribed into the front the motto "Onoare și Patrie" ("Honour and Fatherland"). The name of the respective unit is engraved into the reverse.

Other features of the military colours are a tie for attaching decorations, six sashes for the troops in the flag's guard and a protective cover of impermeable fabric.

The military colours of navy vessels are identical to their ensign. The ensign is in turn identical to the national flag, being made of ordinary canvas in various dimensions, according to the ship's rank, size and place of hoisting.

At the beginning of the 2000s, four identifying flags were selected for the armed forces:

- The flag of the General Staff is light yellow. One side shows the coat of arms of the General Staff and four gold stars, with the symbols of the General Staff and the land, naval and air forces in the corners. On the reverse are the Prophet Elijah, the Virgin Mary and Saint George, patrons of the air force, navy and land forces respectively.
- The flag of the General Staff of the Land Forces is red. One side shows the coat of arms of the Staff, four gold stars, and the symbol of the land forces in the corners. The reverse depicts Saint George.
- The flag of the General Staff of the Air Force is light blue. One side shows the coat of arms of the Staff, four gold stars, and the symbol of the air force in the corners. The reverse depicts the Prophet Elijah.
- The flag of the General Staff of the Navy is sea blue. One side shows the coat of arms of the Staff, four gold stars, and the symbol of the navy in the corners. The reverse depicts the Virgin Mary.

=== Naval jack and rank flags ===
Current Navy jack

Between 1995 and 1998, the Romanian naval jack was similar to the rank flags of Navy officers. Afterward, it was replaced with a 1:1 national flag with two crossed white anchors in the center of the blue stripe, similarly to the naval jack used between 1966 and 1989. The present day naval jack features an anchor on a light-blue background with the national flag in the canton.

The standard of the Chief of the General Staff is a square Romanian tricolor with four white stars, one beneath the other, in the center of the blue stripe. It can be used both as car standard or as rank flag on Navy vessels.

The ships' pennant is a horizontal piece of canvas in the shape of an isosceles triangle, with a 1:10 ratio, on which is printed the Romanian national tricolor.

The Album des pavillons nationaux et des marques distinctives (2000) also depicts the rank flags of navy officers. These flags indicate that a commanding or leadership officer is on board. With one exception, they are rectangular light blue 2:3 canvases, on which are found a blue anchor, the Romanian flag in the canton and a number of five-pointed yellow stars, according to rank: four for the Chief of the Naval Forces Staff, three for the Deputy Chief of the Naval Staff, two for fleet or flotilla Commander and one for a major Naval unit Commander. The flag of a regular Navy unit Commander is, by exception, triangular and it lacks stars.

== Former flags used by the Socialist Republic of Romania ==
=== Flags of the president, prime minister and minister of the armed forces ===
The president of the RSR (until 1974 the president of the Council of State) and the prime minister had their own standard, a square Romanian tricolor with a white edge and a red border beyond that; the RSR's coat of arms was in the center, 2/3 the height of the tricolor's width. The standard was decorated with fringes of golden thread and tassels of the same material. The flag of the minister of the armed forces of the RSR consisted of a white pennant in a 1:2 ratio. The flag of the RSR was placed in the canton, while two red five-pointed stars occupied the fly.

President's flag

Flag of the minister of defense

Flag of the other ministers

=== Military colours ===
On 28 July 1950 the Great National Assembly issued Decree nr. 189 for the establishment of the military colors of the Romanian People's Army, as well as standards for the Military Air Force and the Naval Forces. Article 2 defined the units' military colors as follows: "three silk stripes colored red, yellow and blue, arranged vertically with blue situated near the flagpole. On the edges the flag has golden metal fringes, while the fly corners each have a tassel of the same wire. On the side oriented from the flagpole to the right, in the middle, is placed the coat of arms of the R. P. R. in natural colors. Above the coat of arms, on the same side, in an arched line, is written with letters of golden wire: 'Pentru Patria noastră' ('For our Fatherland'). On the other side and in the middle of the flag, the emblem worn on the uniforms of officers of the Armed Forces of the R. P. R. is applied. Under the emblem is written straight, with letters of golden wire, the unit's name. The flagpole ends in an ogive-shaped tip, within which is found a five-pointed star, in the center of which are written the initials RPR". The law's annex also specified the dimensions of the flag (100 centimeter long by 60 centimeter wide), the coat of arms and the emblem (20 centimeter high), the fringes (5 centimeter long), the flagpole (250 centimeter long) and of the ogive (15 centimeter long by 7 centimeter wide).

1950 military colors (front)

back

1952 military colors (front)

Article 3 described the Air Force ensign: "it is made of sky-blue silk. The ensign is rectangular, with each face having applied to it 18 red silk strips in the form of sunrays. On the edges, the ensign has fringes and tassels the same as on the military colors. In the middle of the face oriented from the flagpole to the right is affixed the coat of arms of the R. P. R., while in the middle of the other face is affixed the emblem worn on the uniforms of officers belonging to the Armed Forces of the R. P. R. The coat of arms of the R. P. R., the emblem and the inscriptions are identical to those of the military colors". The annex specified the dimensions of the ensign and the decorative elements, which were identical to those of the military colors. In the center of the flag, a ray had an angle of 10˚. Also specified was the shade of blue to be used on the flag: "iron blue".

1950 Air Force flag (front)

and back

1952 Air Force flag (front)

Military colors and standards adopted during the Romanian People's Republic were modified or completely changed by Decree nr. 106 of 24 December 1966 regarding regulations for granting the military colors of units and large units from all military branches, modifying the display protocol for ensigns and pennants of navy and Coast Guard ships, establishing a distinctive emblem and commanders' emblems for navy and Coast Guard vessels, a jack for navy ships and a distinctive ensign for Coast Guard ships.

Article 4 described the Romanian Navy's ensign thus: "made of two pieces of white and blue silk, rectangular, laid horizontally, the blue one, beneath, having a width of 20 centimeter, while the white one, above, having a width of 40 centimeter. The coat of arms of the R. P. R. is applied to the middle of the white surface on the face oriented from the flagpole to the right, while on the other face, also in the middle of the while surface, the emblem worn on the uniforms of officers belonging to the Armed Forces of the R. P. R. is applied. The coat of arms, the emblem, the inscriptions, the fringes and the tassels are the same as those of the military colors". The annex specified the flag's dimensions (also 100 × 60 centimeter) and those of the coat of arms (also 20 centimeter high), as well as its distance to the edges of the white strip (11 centimeter above and 9 centimeter below). The words "Pentru Patria noastră" ("For our Fatherland") were found on the white strip above the coat of arms, while "Republica Populară Română" and the unit's name were placed in the middle of the blue strip.

1950 Navy ensign (front)

and back

1952 flag of Navy land units (front)

Decree nr. 190 of 1950, published in the same issue of Buletinul Oficial, established the design of Army soldiers', officers' and generals' emblems. The officers' emblem was a five-pointed, red-enamelled star 34 centimeter in diameter. In the center were two circles: the first, with a radius of 15 centimeter, was enamelled yellow and touched the star's interior angles, while the second, which had a radius of 11 centimeter, was enamelled blue and in the center had the golden initials "R. P. R."

The following year, Decree nr. 124 of 20 July 1951 for the modification of art. 4 of Decree nr. 189 altered the Navy's ensign. The new regulation provided for three separate insignia: the flag of Navy land units, the flag of Navy ships and the flag of Coast Guard ships.

The Navy's land units had as their flag "two pieces of silk, colored white and blue, rectangular in shape, laid horizontally, the blue piece below, and the white one above. In the middle of the white area facing from the flagpole to the right is affixed the coat of arms of the Romanian People's Republic, in natural colors, while on the other side, also in the middle of the white area, is affixed the symbol worn on the uniforms of officers belonging to the Armed Forces of the Romanian People's Republic. The coat of arms, emblem, inscriptions, fringes and tassels are the same as those of the military colors described in article 2 [of Decree nr. 189 of 1950]". According to this decree's annex, the flag's dimensions were 100 × 60 centimeter, the blue strip being 20 centimeter wide and the white 40 centimeter, the coat of arms was 20 centimeter high and it was 11 centimeter away from the top edge of the white strip and 9 centimeter away from the bottom.

Navy battle ships' flag

Coast guard ships' standard

Auxiliary Navy ships' standard

=== Naval ships ===
Navy ships had an ensign consisting of a "piece of ordinary rectangular canvas, with the colors white and blue printed on either side, in two stripes laid horizontally, the blue one below. The coat of arms of the Romanian People's Republic, in natural colors, is affixed to the middle of the white area on both sides. The ensign does not have fringes or tassels [and] is supplied with cords and a mechanism for raising it on the stern beam or the mast". The ensign for Coast Guard ships was different from that of Navy ships only in the color of the lower stripe—Coast Guard green. The law's annex described proportions for the ensign's various elements; the actual dimensions were to be fixed by the Armed Forces Ministry and the Interior Ministry depending on the ship's size and the place where the ensign was raised. Thus, the flag was 0.6 times as wide as it was long, being divided thus: 1/3 colored stripe and 2/3 white stripe. The coat of arms was to be 1/3 the height of the flag's width, being placed 1/6 of this width away from the edges of the white stripe.

Between 1953 and 1964, due to a spelling reform, the country's name was written on flags as Romînia and not România.

Decree nr. 93 of 17 April 1954 for the modification of art. 4 of Decree nr. 189 established new vexillological devices: the ensign of auxiliary Navy ships (the previous ensign continuing in use only for battleships) and pennants for Navy battleships, auxiliary Navy ships and Coast Guard vessels.

The ensign of auxiliary Navy ships was made of an "ordinary canvas, rectangular and blue. In the upper corner on the side where it attaches to the cord, it has imprinted on both sides the colors white and light blue, in two horizontal stripes, the white one above. To the middle of the white area, on both sides, is affixed the coat of arms of the Romanian People's Republic, in natural colors". This ensign's proportions were indicated in the annex. It was 0.6 times as wide as it was long: the upper left part of the standard was similar in proportion to the basic elements of the battleship standard, while its dimensions were 0.5 of the flag's length and 0.3 of its width.

Navy and Coast Guard vessels had a masthead pennant made of an "ordinary rectangular canvas, red for Navy battleships, blue for auxiliary Navy ships and green for Coast Guard ships [the width is 0.6 of the length]. At the edge near the cord, the colors white and light blue are imprinted on both sides, in two horizontal stripes, for Navy ships and white and light green on Coast Guard ships [in proportions of 2/3 and 1/3 respectively; this area's length is 0.075 that of the pennant's length]. In both cases white shall be above. The coat of arms of the Romanian People's Republic, in natural colors is affixed to the middle of the white area on both sides [with a height 1/3 of the pennant's width and located 1/4 and 1/6 of this width away from the edges of the white area]. At the other end, the pennant is cut in the form of a sharp angle pointing inward [the cut was 1.2 times as deep as the length of the white and colored area near the cord]. The ships' pennant is provided with a cord and a mechanism for being raised on a tall mast". The proportions of the pennant's component elements were indicated in the annex, with the actual dimensions remaining to be decided by the Armed Forces Ministry and the Interior Ministry.

Pennant of Navy battle ships

Pennant of Coast Guard ships

Pennant of auxiliary Navy ships

=== Military colours, 1968 pattern ===
All the flags of the former 1950 pattern were replaced altogether in 1967 with a new national colours pattern for the Armed Forces and other uniformed services, wherein the emblem of the Socialist Republic was used. In the attached commentary, it was mentioned that the previous regulations were no longer valid, primarily because:

- military colors of naval land units no longer featured the national flag colors, but only white and blue;
- ensigns and pennants of the Navy and Coast Guard ships no longer featured the national flag colors and thus—even at close distances—Romanian ships could be confused with those of other nations;
- the air force flag was no longer necessary, as it did not correspond to the new organization of the air force within the armed forces.
Military colors of the RSR (front)

back

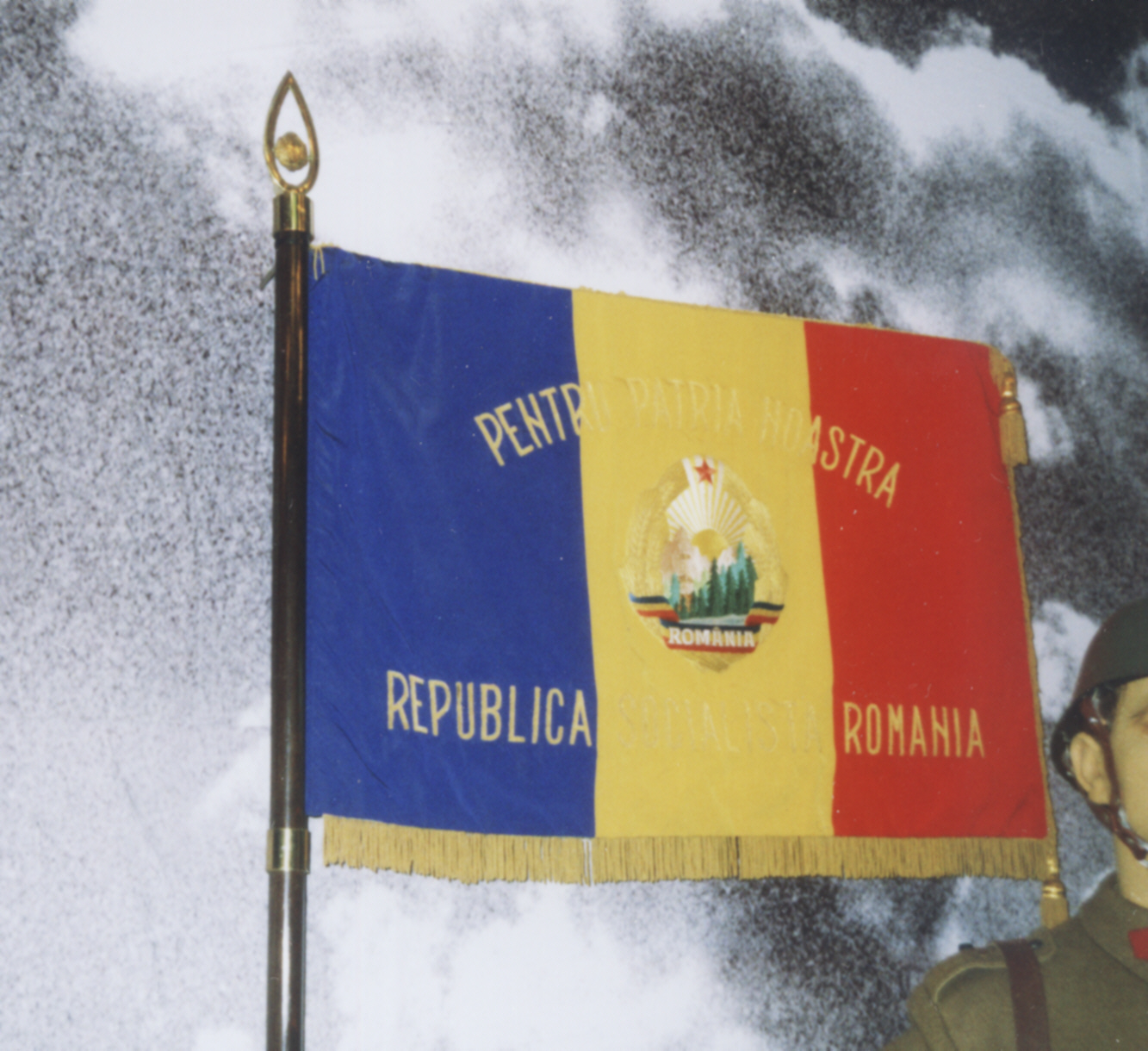
Photograph showing the pole and ogive on top

The new design was a return to the Naval Forces and Air Force of the national flag design as the basis for unit colors, which were retained by the Land Forces.

Article 2 of the decree provided that "the military colors are granted by the Council of State of the Romanian Socialist Republic to units and large units from all military branches from the Armed Forces Ministry, as well as to units from the Internal Affairs Ministry, at their founding. The flag is granted, depending on the case, at the initiative of the armed forces minister or the internal affairs minister. The granting of the flag is done in the name of the Council of State of the Romanian Socialist Republic by a representative of the armed forces, respectively of the internal affairs minister". The first clause of this article was modified thus by Decree nr. 150 of 19 June 1974 regarding the modification of certain laws and decrees: "the flag is granted by presidential decree to units and large units of all military branches from the Armed Forces Ministry, as well as to units from the Internal Affairs Ministry, at their founding".

Ensigns of navy and Coast Guard vessels consisted of the military colors of the respective units. The pennant was the device that indicated a ship was armed and commanded by a navy officer. It consisted of an "ordinary canvas, in the shape of an isosceles triangle, with the base toward the attaching mechanism and with the flag colors and coat of arms of the Romanian Socialist Republic printed on both sides". The jack was "an ordinary square canvas, having printed on both sides the flag colors and coat of arms of the Romanian Socialist Republic. Two crossed white anchors of the same size as the coat of arms are affixed to the blue area". The distinctive ensign of Coast Guard vessels consisted of "an ordinary white rectangular canvas, with the half near the attaching mechanism green, upon which is affixed a white anchor".

Ships' pennant

Navy jack

Ensign of Coast Guard ships

The dimensions of these insignia, as well as their manner of use, were left to the Armed Forces Ministry to decide by regulation.

=== Naval rank flags ===
Decree nr. 1016 of 1966 created a legal framework for the establishment of distinctive rank flags and commanders' rank flags, which were raised on Navy and Coast Guard ships, in accordance with the services' sailing regulations.

A distinctive rank flag was raised when "the general secretary of the Central Committee of the Romanian Communist Party, the president of the Council of State of the Romanian Socialist Republic or the president of the Council of Ministers of the Romanian Socialist Republic [was] on an official visit" aboard ship.

The commanders' rank flag was flown in similar situations for: "the minister of the armed forces of the Romanian Socialist Republic, the commander of the navy, the commander of a large unit of ships of the commander of a group of ships temporarily constituted".

The form, colors and dimensions of the flags remained to be fixed by regulation.

=== Patriotic Guards ===
Decree nr. 90 of 27 April 1977 regarding the establishment of military colors for the patriotic guards and the regulation of its bestowment created a special symbol for units of the Patriotic Guards. This was similar to military colors of military units, with the exception of the inscription on the flag's reverse side — "Gărzile patriotice" — in an arched line above the coat of arms, and the administrative unit in which the formation was located (the municipality or county), in a straight line beneath the coat of arms. Its dimensions were indicated in the annex: the canvas was 100 centimeter long and 66 centimeter wide, the text was 6 centimeter high, the fringes 5 centimeter long, the flagpole 240 centimeter long and 4 centimeter wide, while the ogive at the end of the flagpole was 15 centimeter high. According to the Decree, the flag was granted to a unit by commanders of county-level or Bucharest-level Patriotic Guards, or by representatives of the General Staff of the Patriotic Guards from the Central Committee of the Romanian Communist Party, following a presidential decree for this purpose. Patriotic Guards that distinguished themselves in training exercises for national defense and that comprised at least 2000 fighters were eligible to receive their unit flags.

Flag of the Patriotic Guards (front)

Flag of the Patriotic Guards (back)

== Bibliography ==
=== Laws, decrees, decisions and regulations ===
- Decree no. 1 of the provisional Government of Wallachia, published in Monitorul Român, no. 1 of 19 June/1 July 1848.
- Decree no. 252 of the provisional Government of Wallachia, published in Monitorul Român, no. 6 of 19/31 July 1848.
- The Law for establishing the coat of arms of Romania, adopted on 24 April 1867.
- The Law for modifying the coat of arms of Romania, published in Monitorul Oficial al României, no. 57 of 11/23 March 1872.
- Decree no. 3 from 8 January 1948, regarding the attributions of the Presidium of the People's Republic of Romania, published in Monitorul Oficial, no. 7 of 9 January 1948.
- Decree no. 972 from 5 November 1968 regarding the symbols of the Socialist Republic of Romania, published in Buletinul Oficial, no. 141 of 5 November 1968.
- Decree-Law no. 2/1989 regarding the membership, organization and functioning of the Council of the National Salvation Front and of the territorial councils of the National Salvation Front, published in Monitorul Oficial no. 4 of 27 December 1989.
- Law no. 75, of 16 July 1994, regarding the display of the Romanian flag, the singing of the national anthem and the use of insignia containing the Romanian coat of arms by public authority and institutions, published in Monitorul Oficial no. 237 of 26 August 1994.
- Law no. 96 from 20 May 1998 regarding the proclamation of the National Flag Day, in Monitorul Oficial no. 190 of 22 May 1998.
- Governmental Decision no. 1157/2001 for approving the Regulations regarding the display of the Romanian flag, the singing of the national anthem and the use of insignia containing the Romanian coat of arms, published in Monitorul Oficial no. 776 of 5 December 2001.
- Law no. 15 from 21 June 1968: the Penal Code of Romania.

=== Other works ===
- Căzănișteanu, Constantin, Trei culori cunosc pe lume... (I know only three colors in the world) in Magazin istoric, no. 8/1967.
- Dogaru, Maria, Tricolorul și cocardele în contextul luptei revoluționarilor pașoptiști (The tricolor and the cockades during the struggle of the 1848 revolutionaries), in Revista de istorie no. 5 of 31 May 1978 (extract).
- Mihalache, Marin, Cuza Vodă (Prince Cuza), Editura Tineretului, Bucharest, 1967.
- Năsturel, Petre Vasiliu, Steagul și stema României. Perioada convențională (The flag and the coat of arms of Romania. Conventional period), in Albina, year IV, 1900/1901, no. 10; no. 38; no. 151.
- Pălănceanu, Elena, Steaguri din colecția Muzeului de Istorie al Republicii Socialiste România (Flags from the collection of the History Museum of the Socialist Republic of Romania), in Muzeul Național, vol. I, Bucharest, 1974.
- Velcu, Anton, Steagurile României (The flags of Romania) in Enciclopedia României, vol. I, Bucharest, 1938.

=== Vexilological albums ===
- Armand du Payrat, Daniel Roudaut, Album des pavillons nationaux et des marques distinctives, Service Hydrographique et Océanographique de la Marine, Brest, 2000, ISBN 978-2-11-088247-9.

== See also ==
- Coat of arms of Romania
- History of the flags of Romania
- List of Romanian flags
- Romanian heraldry
