= Twenty lei =

(Romania)
- Value: 20 Romanian lei
- Width: 136 mm
- Height: 77 mm
- Security features: watermark, security thread, transparent window, microprinting, blacklight printing, gold-like overprint, EURion constellation
- Material used: polymer
- Years of printing: since 12.1.2021

Obverse
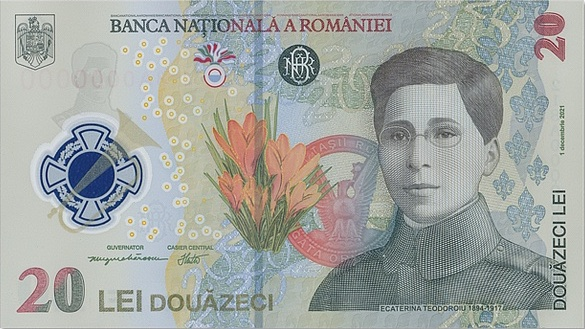
- Design: Ecaterina Teodoroiu and crocus flavus
- Designer: National Bank of Romania
- Design date: 2021

Reverse
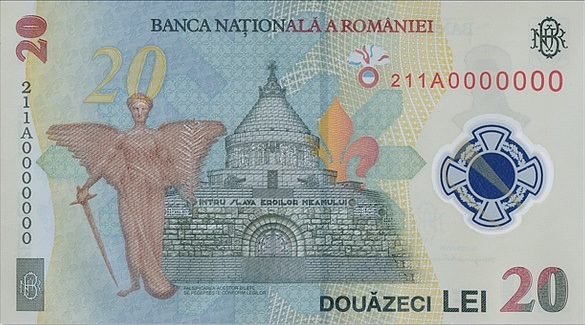
- Design: Mausoleum of Mărășești, Victoria as depicted on the Romanian Victory Medal
- Designer: National Bank of Romania
- Design date: 2021

The twenty lei banknote is one of the circulating denominations of the Romanian lei.

The main color of the banknote is Olive green. It depicts heroine and soldier Ecaterina Teodoroiu on the obverse and Mausoleum of Mărășești with Victoria as depicted on the Romanian Victory Medal.

In 2021 National Bank of Romania has officially presented the new 20-lei banknote, which has been put into circulation starting from 1 December 2021. It is the first banknote with legal tender to feature a female personality.

It is printed using the offset printing technique (like the one leu and five lei banknotes). The official reason was the prevention of counterfeiting.
