= One ban =

Romanian unit of currency

- Romania
- Value: 0.01 Romanian leu
- Mass: 2.4 g
- Diameter: 16.75 mm
- Thickness: 1.6 mm
- Edge: Smooth
- Composition: Brass-plated steel
- Years of minting: 1867, 1900, 1952-1954, 2005-present

Obverse
- Design: 'ROMANIA', Coat of arms, eight four-pointed stars, year of minting
- Design date: 2004/2005

Reverse
- Design: 1 BAN
- Design date: 2004/2005

The Romanian one-ban coin is a unit of currency equalling one one-hundredth of a Romanian leu. It is the lowest-denomination coin of the present currency and has been minted every year since the leu was redenominated in 2005. As well as Romania, the coin has been minted in the United Kingdom (1867), Germany (1900) and Russia (1952).

== History ==
=== Principality ===
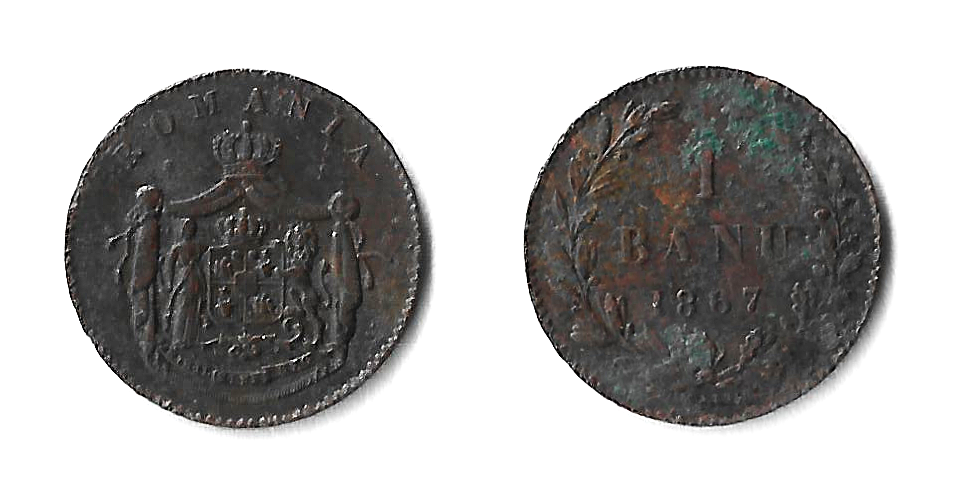
1 Banu coin from 1867

The first one-ban coin was struck in 1867 by two different mints in Birmingham, England: Heaton and Watt & Co. The coin measured 15mm in diameter and weighed 1g. It was composed of 95% copper, 4% tin and 1% zinc. The obverse featured the name of the country and its coat of arms. The reverse featured the denomination within a laurel branch and oak branch. The denomination within the wreath read 1 BANU and 1867. The short 'u' sound at the end of Romanian words was common in pronunciation, but was made obsolete in 1904 by the 'Regule ortografice' (spelling regulations), printed by the Romanian Academy. Each mint struck 2.5 million of the coin. Watt & Co. used the mintmark WATT & C below the wreath while Heaton used a H. While their other Romanian coins in 1867 used their full name, space was a constraint on the 1 banu. The coins entered circulation on 1 January 1868.

=== Kingdom ===
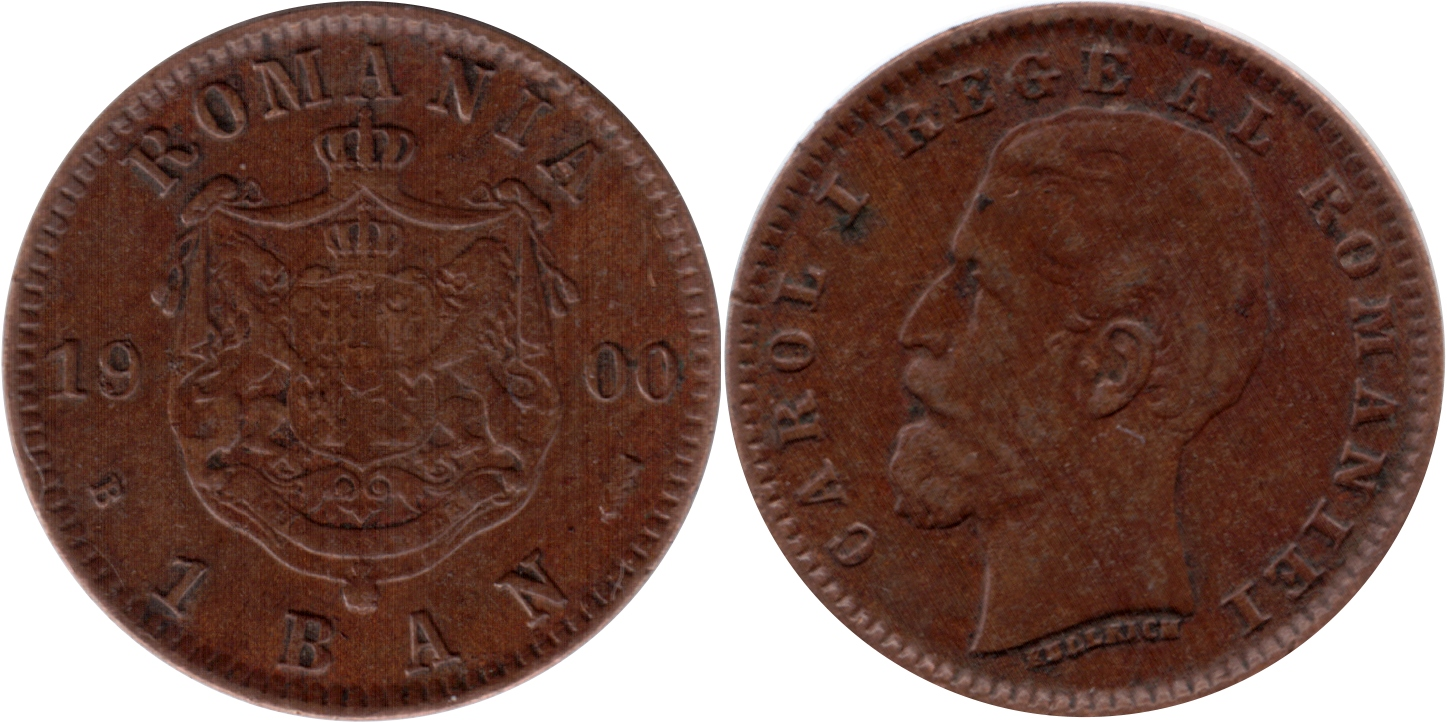
1 Ban coin from 1900

The first one-ban coin to feature the Romanian monarch was minted in 1900 and featured on its obverse King Carol I and the national coat of arms on the reverse. It retained the dimensions and composition of the 1867 coin. The King's inscription read CAROL I REGE AL ROMANIEI (King of the Romanians). Below his head was the name KULLRICH, the surname of the engraver. On the reverse, the date was split across each side of the coat of arms. Below the coat of arms on the right was an ear of wheat, while on the left was the mintmark B. Although representing the Romanian capital Bucharest, the 20 million of these coins from 1900 were minted in Hamburg, Germany. No 1 ban coins were minted in any other years of the Kingdom of Romania due to inflation.

=== Communism ===
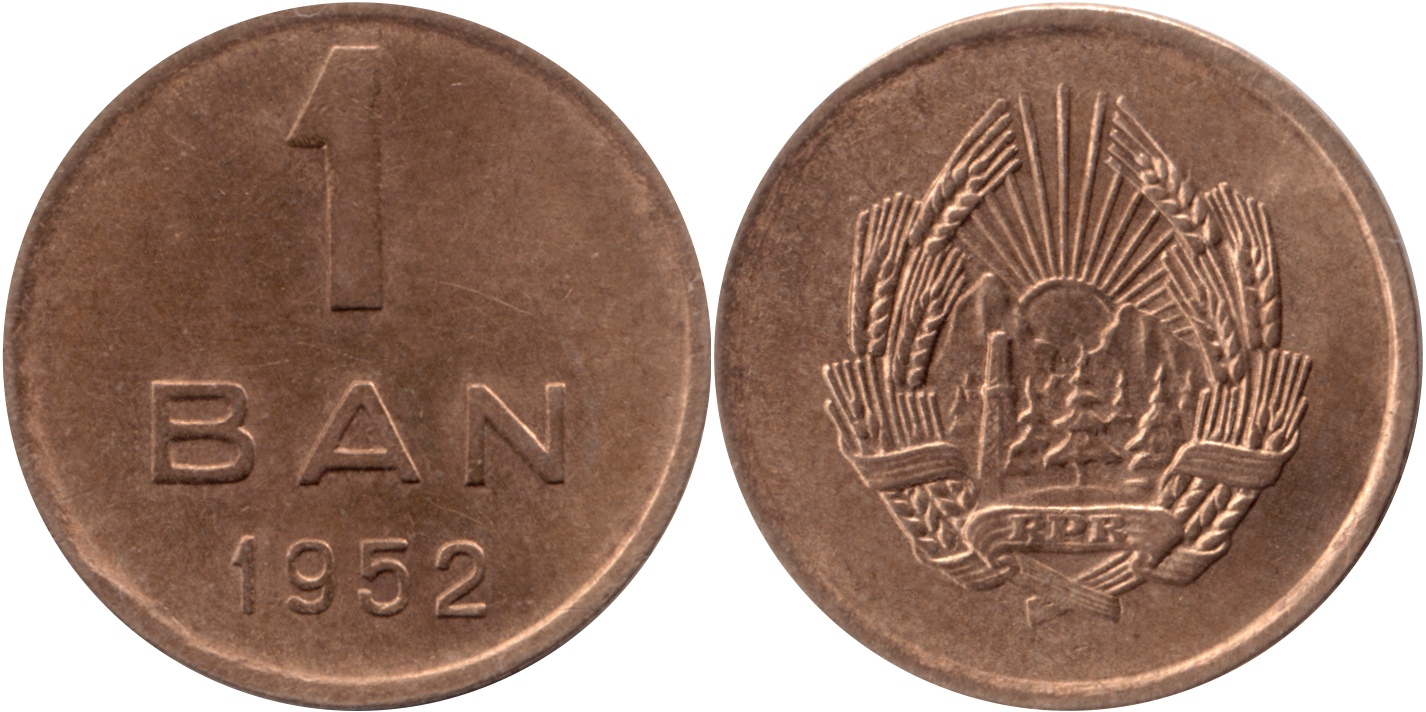
1 ban coin from 1952

The denomination returned in 1952 under communist rule, after a monetary reform on 28 January of that year. Its dimensions and mass remained the same as in 1867 and 1900, although the composition changed to 95% copper and 5% aluminium. The coin featured Romania's communist coat of arms on the obverse. The reverse featured the denomination and year in plain type. The coin was minted at Moscow Mint in Soviet Russia and 67.4 million were issued. The next year a star was placed above the coat of arms, akin to other communist nations. For 1953, 8 million of the coin were issued from Bucharest, but after 15.3 million in 1954 the denomination was again demonetised.

=== After 1989 ===
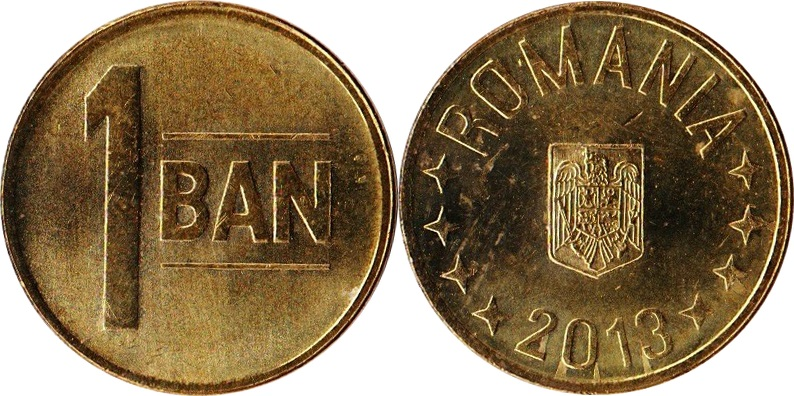
1 ban from 2013

On 1 July 2005, the leu was redenominated, with 10,000 old leu becoming equal to one new leu. Thus, the new 1 ban coin was equivalent to 100 old lei, a denomination which had been demonetised in 1996. The one-ban coins were sold to large shops in rolls of fifty.

Two version of the new 1 ban coin exist, the first being 0.05mm wider in diameter. The first issues of all of Romania's new coins were of a different diameter to the present, but none by more than 0.15mm.
