= Ten lei =

- Country: Romania
- Value: 10 Romanian lei
- Width: 133 mm
- Height: 72 mm
- Security features: watermark, security thread, transparent window, microprinting, blacklight printing, gold-like overprint, EURion constellation
- Material used: polymer
- Years of printing: since 2005

Obverse
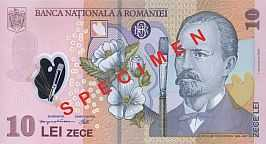
- Design: Nicolae Grigorescu, Marshmallow, paintbrush, palette
- Designer: National Bank of Romania
- Design date: 2005, revised in 2008

Reverse
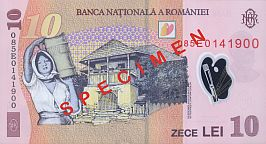
- Design: Traditional house from Oltenia, part from the Rodica painting
- Designer: National Bank of Romania
- Design date: 2005, revised in 2008

The ten lei banknote is one of the circulating denominations of the Romanian leu. It is the same size as the 20 Euro banknote.

The main color of the banknote is pink. It depicts painter Nicolae Grigorescu on the obverse and a traditional house from Oltenia on the reverse, and a detail from the painting Rodica.

The original issue was printed using the intaglio technique. On 1 December 2008, the National Bank of Romania issued a second, revised banknote. It is printed using the offset printing technique (like the one leu and five lei banknotes). The official reason was the prevention of counterfeiting. The new series shares the design with the previous series, the main difference being in the printing technique and the corresponding security features. As a result of the different printing technique, the second series appear lighter coloured than the first series.

== History ==
In the past, the denomination was also in the coin form, as follows:

First leu (1867–1947)

- banknote issue: 1877 (the hypothecary issue)
- coin issue: 1930
- banknote issue: 1944 (issued by the Red Army Comandament and circulated in 1944)

Second leu (1947–1952)

- no issues

Third leu – ROL (1952–2005)

- banknote issue: 1952, 1966
- coin issue: 1990 (re-issues: 1991, 1992), 1993 (re-issues: 1994, 1995)

Fourth leu – RON (since 2005)

- banknote issue: 2005 (redesigned issue of the former 100,000 lei banknote, whereas 100,000 third lei = 10 fourth lei; re-issue: 2008)

Earlier versions of the 10 lei banknote.

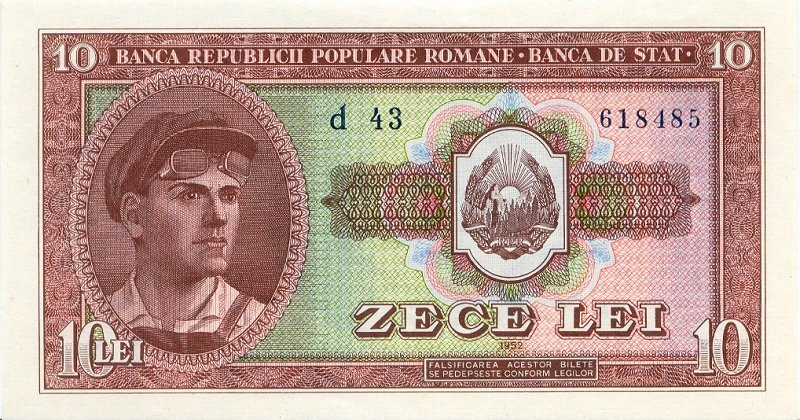
Obverse

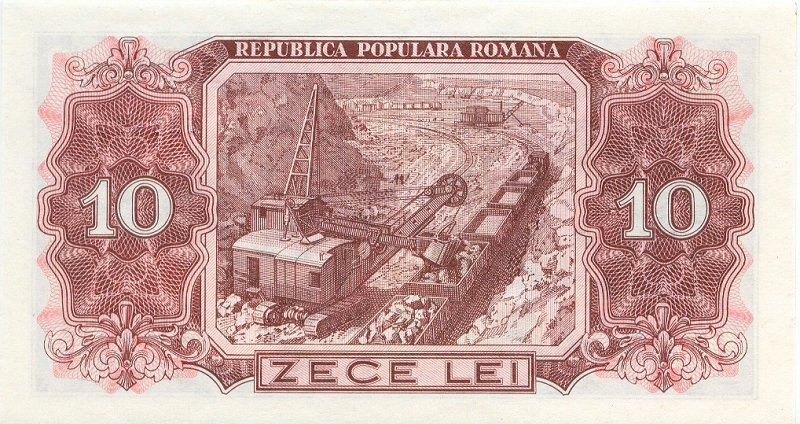
Reverse

1952 10 lei issue

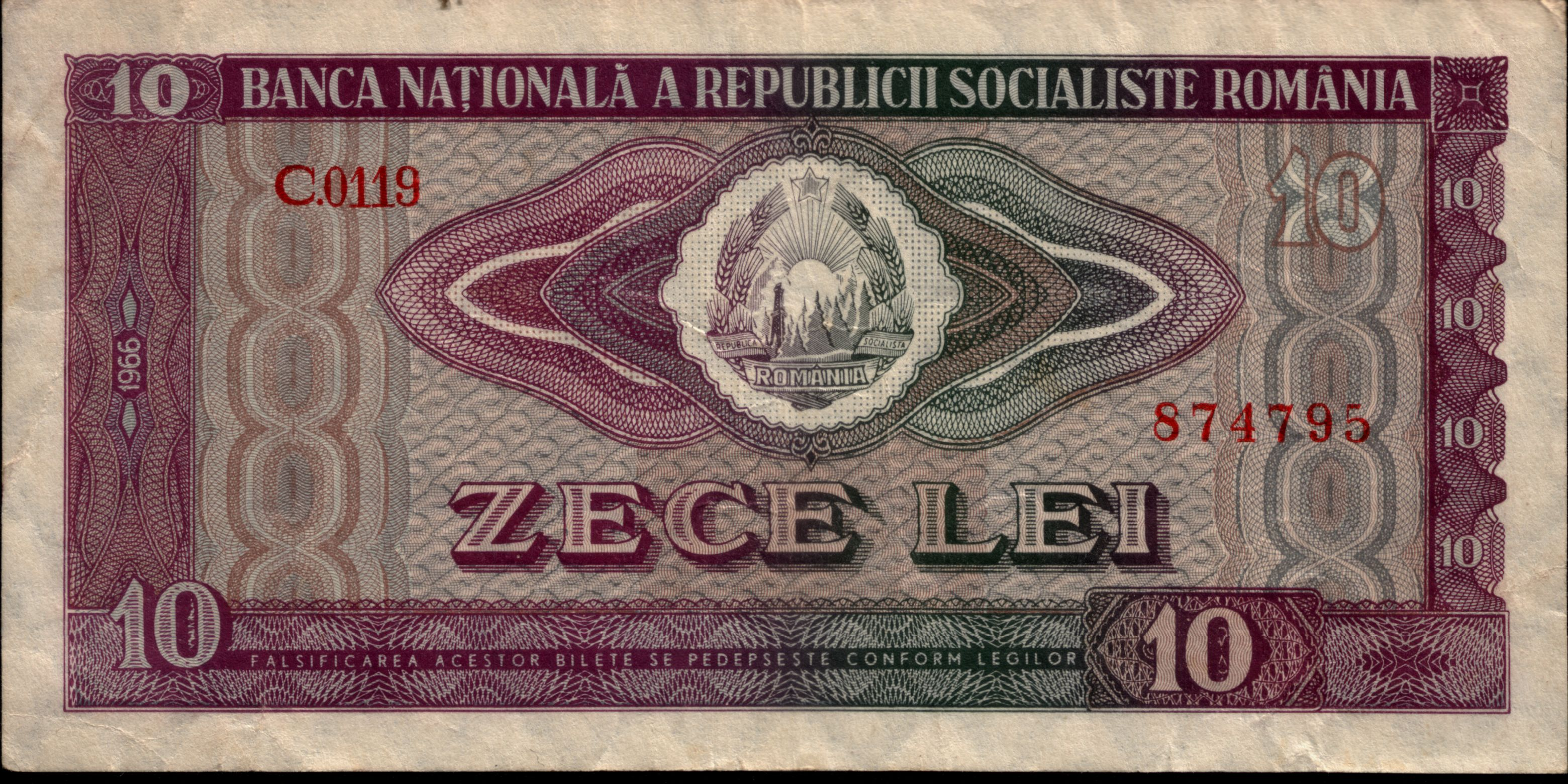
Obverse

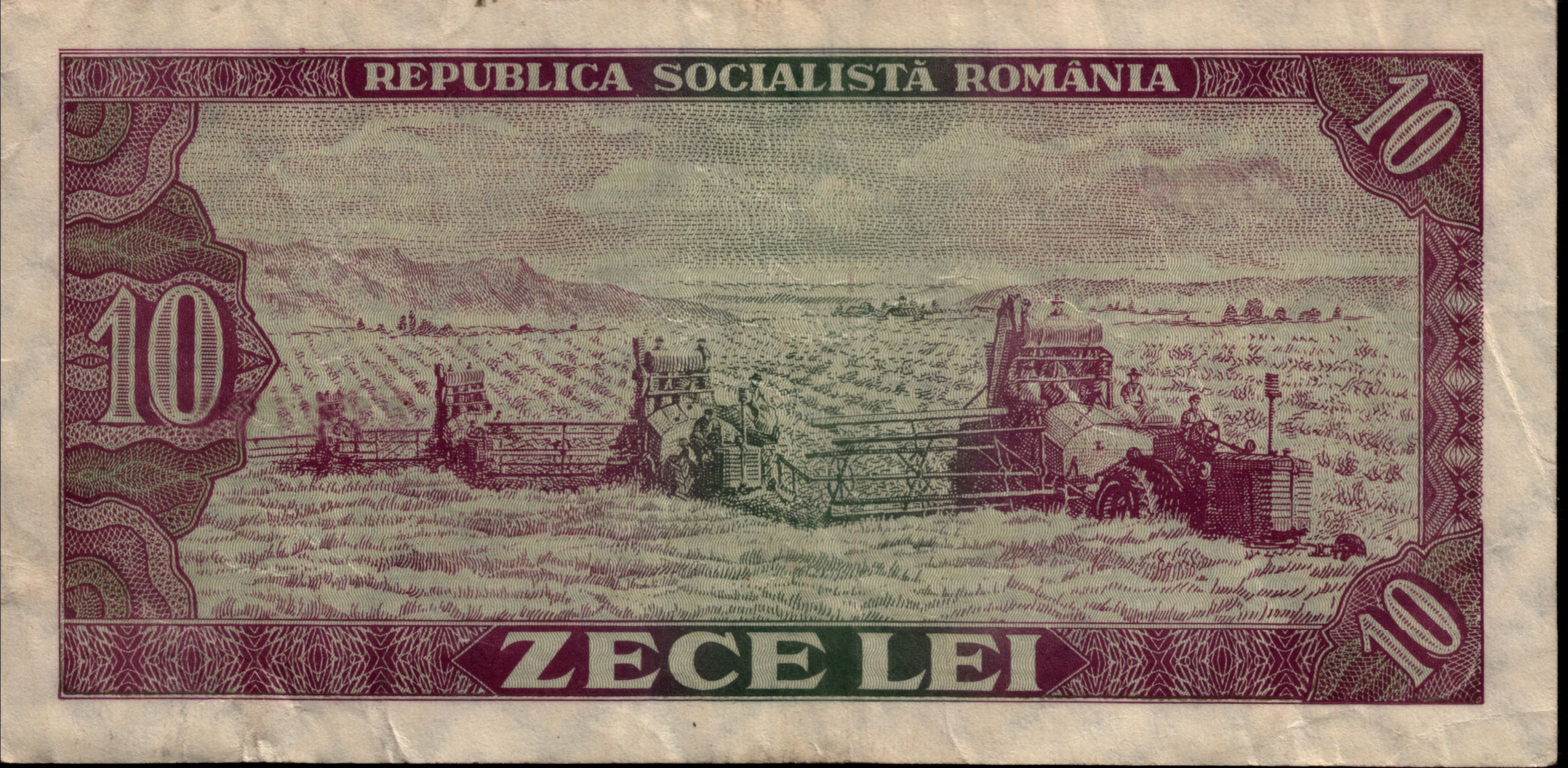
Reverse

1966 10 lei issue

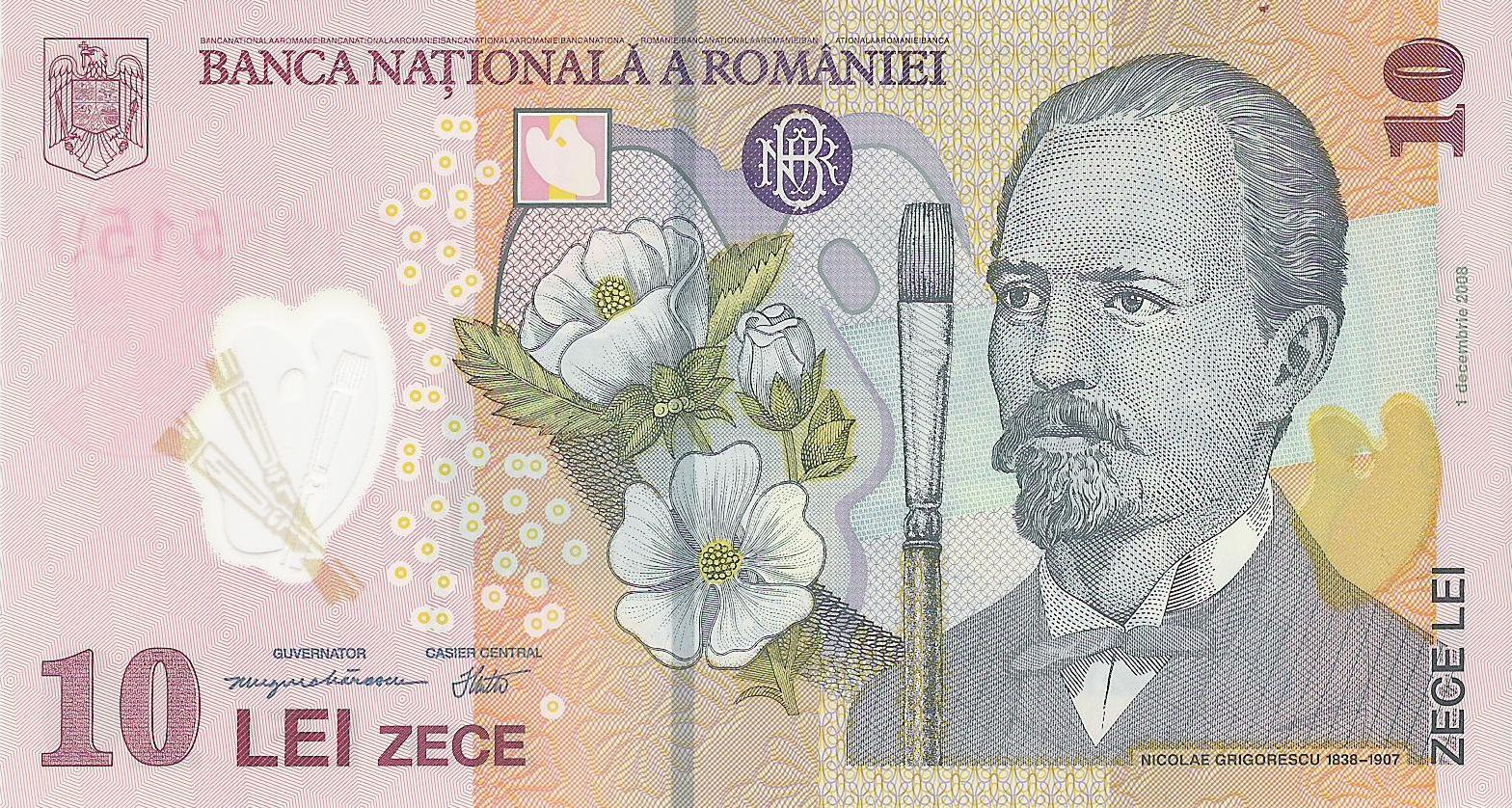
Obverse

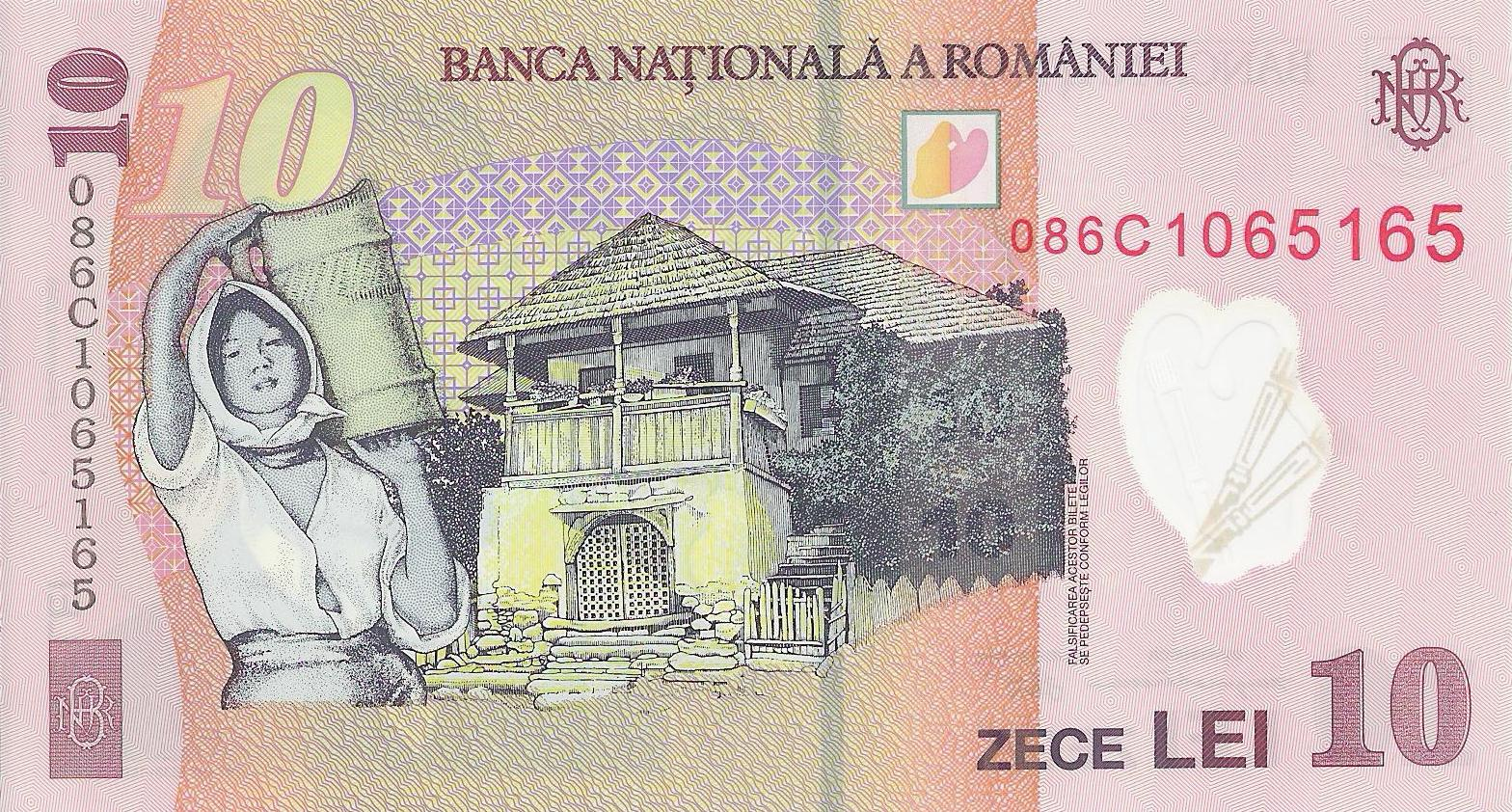
Reverse

The 2005 original new leu issue
