= Five bani =

- Romania
- Value: 0.05 Romanian leu
- Mass: 2.78 g
- Diameter: 18.25 mm
- Thickness: 1.6 mm
- Edge: Milled with 102 reeds
- Composition: Copper plated steel
- Years of minting: 1867, 1900, 1905–1906, 1952–1958, 1963–68, 1975, 2005–present

Obverse
- Design: 'ROMANIA', Coat of arms, eight four-pointed stars, year of minting
- Design date: 2004/2005

Reverse
- Design: 5 BANI
- Design date: 2004/2005

The five bani coin is a coin of the Romanian leu. It is the second-lowest denomination of the present circulating coins, introduced to circulation on 1 July 2005.

== History ==
=== Principality of Romania & Kingdom of Romania ===
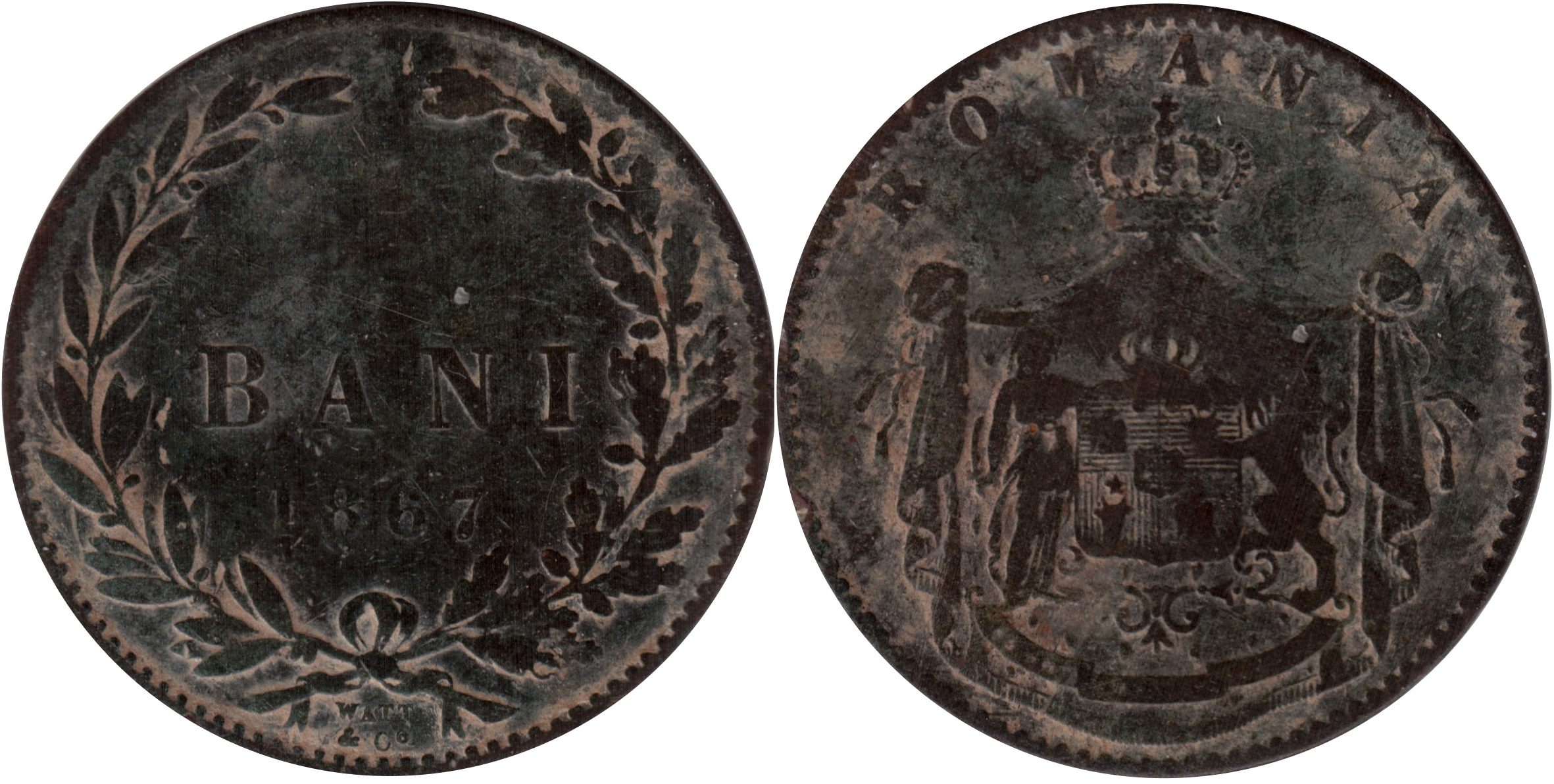
5 bani coin from 1867

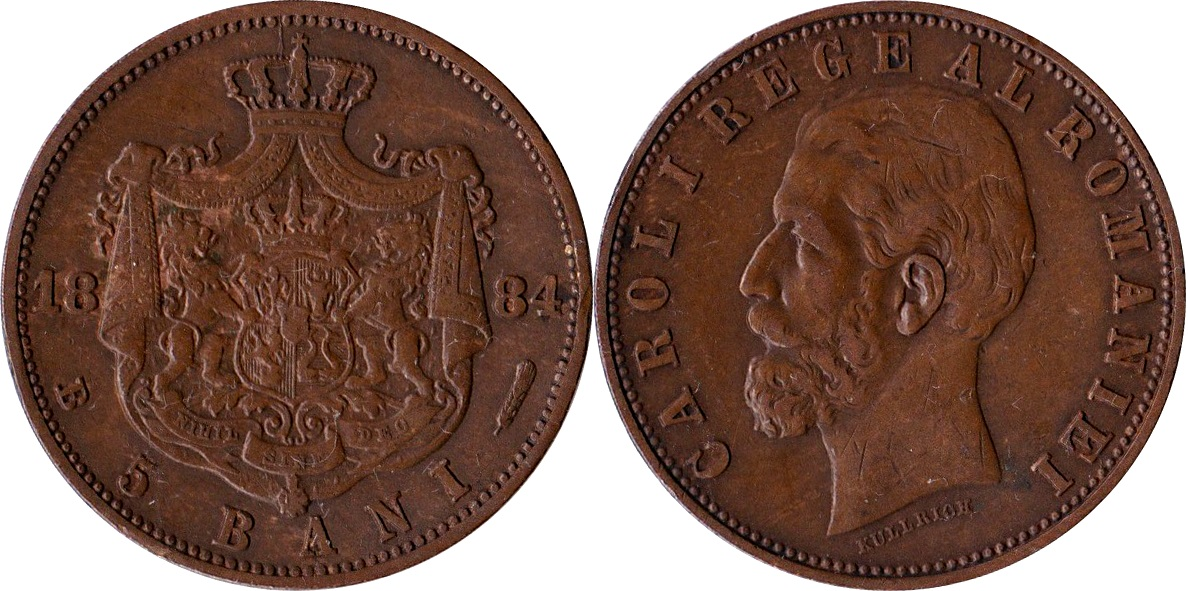
5 bani coin from 1884

The first five-bani coin was struck in 1867 by two different mints in Birmingham, England: Heaton and Watt & Co. The coin measured 25mm in diameter and weighed 5g. It was composed of 95% copper, 4% tin and 1% zinc. The obverse featured the name of the country and its coat of arms. The reverse featured the denomination within a laurel branch and oak branch. The denomination within the wreath read 5 BANI and 1867. Each mint struck 12.5 million of the coin. Watt & Co. used the mintmark WATT & C below the wreath while Heaton used one ofHEATON. The coins entered circulation on 1 January 1868.

A second five-bani coin was struck only in 1900, in Brussels, Belgium. It measured 19mm in diameter and weighed 3.5g. It was made of 75% copper and 25% nickel. Its obverse featured the crown of Romania above the date within a wreath of a laurel branch and oak branch. The reverse featured the denomination and name of the country. A total of 20 million were issued.

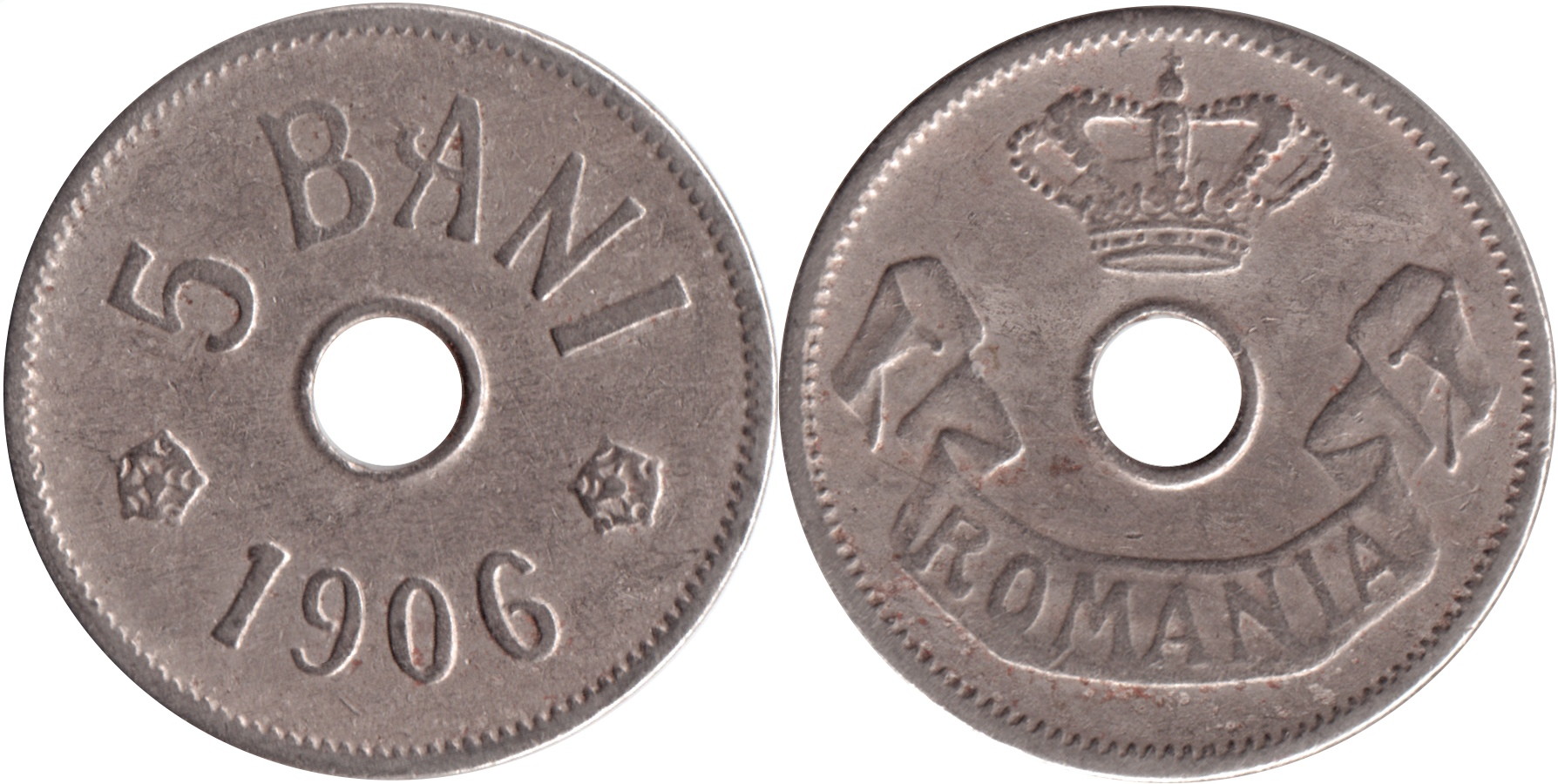
5 bani coin from 1906

The third five-bani coin entered circulation in 1905 and also saw issue the following year. Although the same diameter and composition, it weighed 1g less (2.5g) due to a hole through the centre. On the obverse, the crown was placed above the hole and the name of the country was written on a scroll underneath. The reverse featured the denomination at the top, a rose on each side of the middle and the year at the bottom. The coins were designed by Anton Scharff, chief engraver at the Austrian Mint in Vienna. The 2 million coins of 1905 were minted exclusively at Brussels while in 1906 24 million from Hamburg, Germany supplemented 48 million from Brussels. The Hamburg-struck coins feature a 'J' mintmark below the scroll on the obverse while those of Brussels are without a mintmark.

=== People's Republic of Romania & Socialist Republic of Romania ===
The denomination returned in 1952 under communist rule. The new coin was 20mm in diameter and weighed 2.4g. It was composed of 95% copper and 5% aluminium. The obverse featured Romania's communist coat of arms while the reverse had the denomination and year in plain type. The coin was struck in Moscow in Soviet Russia and 78.4 million were issued in 1952. In 1953 a star was added to the top of the coat of arms to make them similar to those of other communist nations and minting switched to Bucharest, Romania's capital. The coin was issued until 1958 although most from that year bore the date of 1957.

In 1963, the five-bani was reintroduced as a 95% steel coin with 5% nickel as plating. It was also smaller and lighter, with a diameter of 16mm and a mass of 1.7g. The designs remained the same. A total of 95.7 million were struck between 1963 and 1966, all with the date of 1963. An updated coin featuring the arms of the Romanian Socialist Republic (proclaimed 21 August 1965) entered circulation in 1967 yet was dated 1966. The 1968 issue was also dated 1966, a total of 106.881 million five-bani coins with the Socialist arms were released. After seven years with no production, the denomination was revived in 1975 with the same design and dimensions, but was made entirely of aluminium and thus weighed only 0.55g. No more production was done in the following years due to inflation.

=== Republic of Romania ===
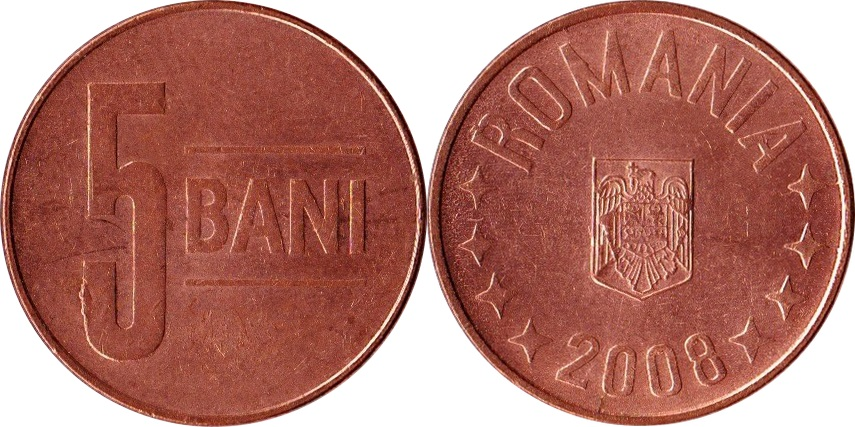
5 bani coin from 2008

The present five-bani coin was introduced on 1 July 2005 as Romania redenominated its currency by 10,000 old lei to one new, thus replacing the old 500 lei coin. Early versions of the coin from its first year, 2005, have a diameter that is 0.05mm narrower.
