= Five hundred lei =

- Country: Romania
- Value: 500 Romanian leu
- Width: 153 mm
- Height: 82 mm
- Security features: watermark, security thread, transparent window, microprinting, blacklight printing, micro perforations, latent writing, EURion constellation, colour-changing ink, ultraviolet ink, security thread, serial number
- Material used: polymer
- Years of printing: since 2005

Obverse
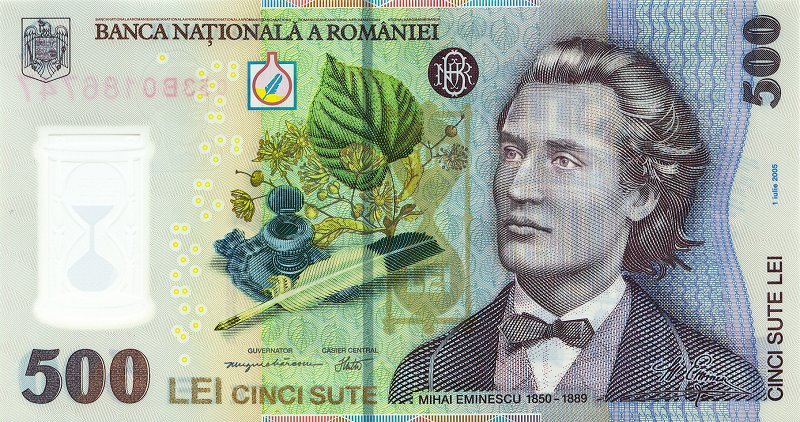
- Design: Mihai Eminescu, Tilia, writing instruments (feather and ink cartridge)
- Designer: National Bank of Romania
- Design date: 2005

Reverse
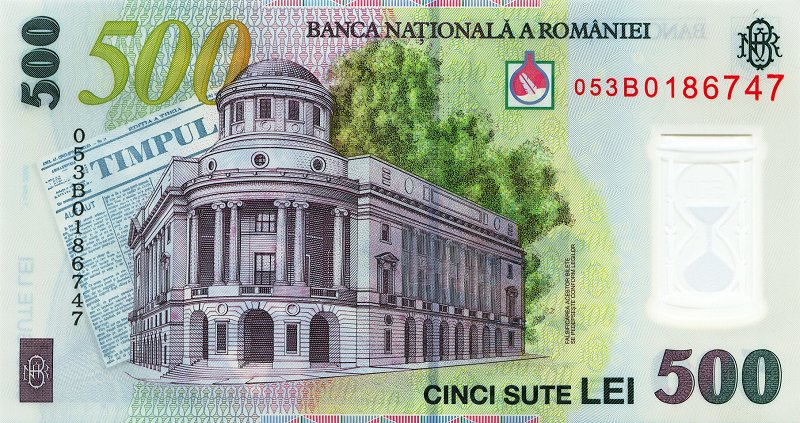
- Design: ”Mihai Eminescu” Central University Library of Iași, Timpul newspaper
- Designer: National Bank of Romania
- Design date: 2005

The five hundred lei banknote is the highest of the circulating denomination of the Romanian leu. It is the same size as the 200 Euro banknote.

The main color of the banknote is gray. It pictures, on the obverse poet Mihai Eminescu, and on the reverse the ”Mihai Eminescu” Central University Library of Iași, and the front page of the Timpul newspaper.

== History ==
In the past, the denomination was also in the coin form, as follows:

First leu (1867-1947)

- banknote issues: 1877 (the hypothecary issue), 1916 (re-issues: 1917, 1918, 1919, 1920), 1924 (re-issue: 1925, 1926, 1927, 1930, 1931, 1932, 1933, 1934, 1938), 1934, 1936 (re-issues: 1939, 1940), 1940 (re-issues: 1941, 1942, 1943)
- coin issues: 1941 (anniversary edition), 1944
- banknote issue: 1944 (issued by the Red Army Comandament and circulated in 1944)
- coin issues: 1945, 1946

Second leu (1947-1952)

- banknote issues: 1947, 1949

Third leu - ROL (1952-2005)

- banknote issues: 1991, 1992
- coin issues: 1999 (re-issue: 2000), 2000 (anniversary edition)

Fourth leu - RON (since 2005)

- banknote issue: 2005

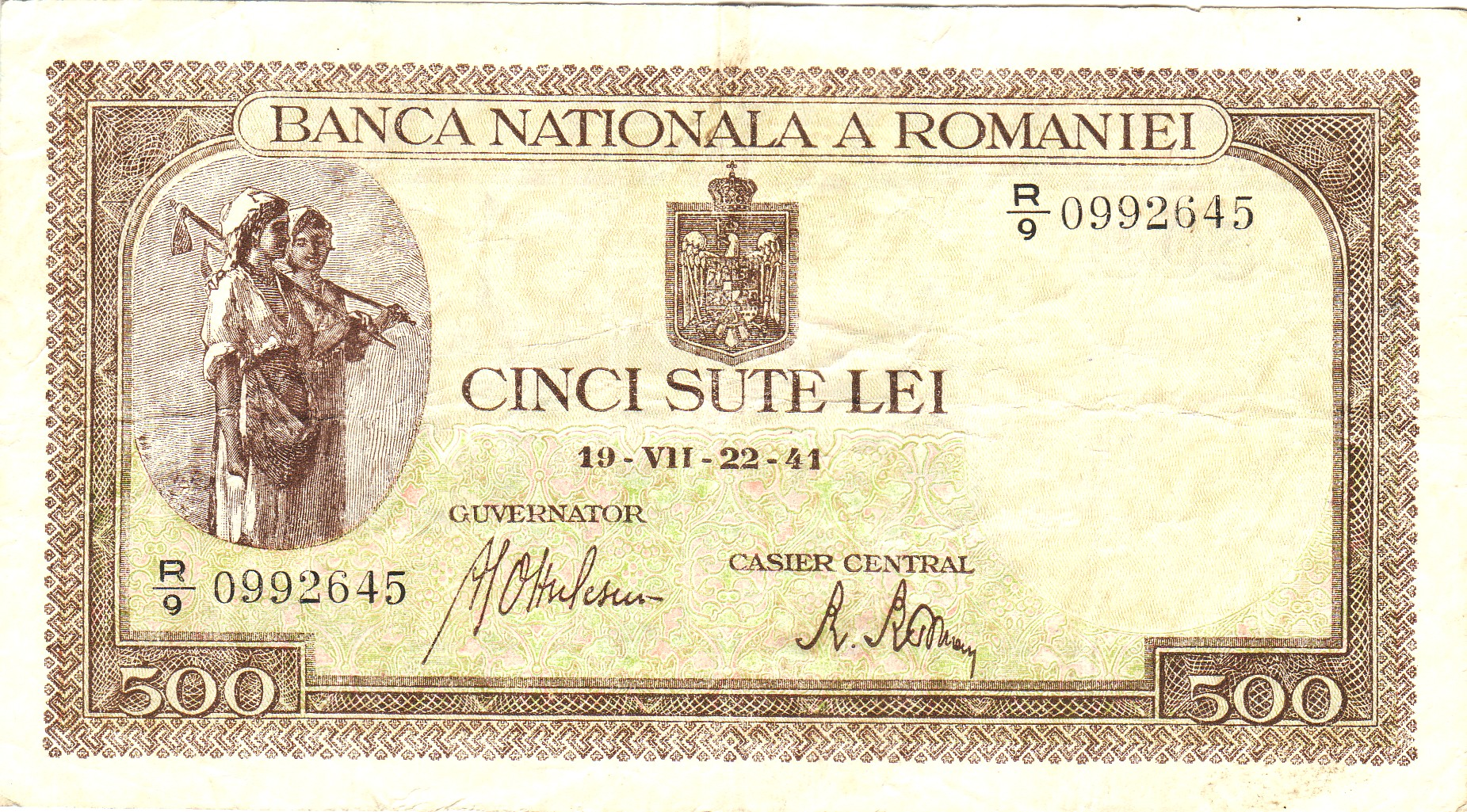
Obverse

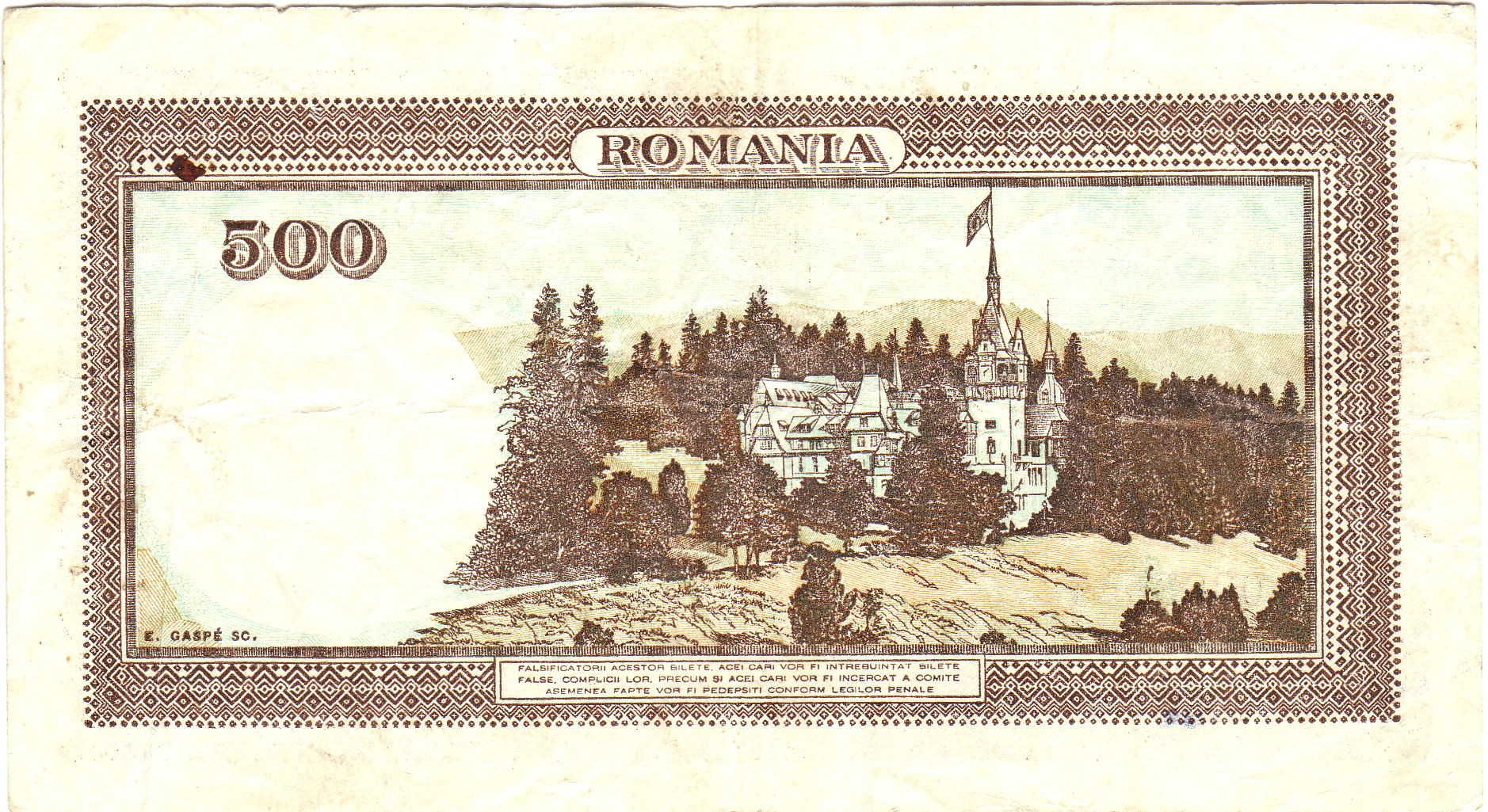
Reverse

1922 to 1941 500 lei issue

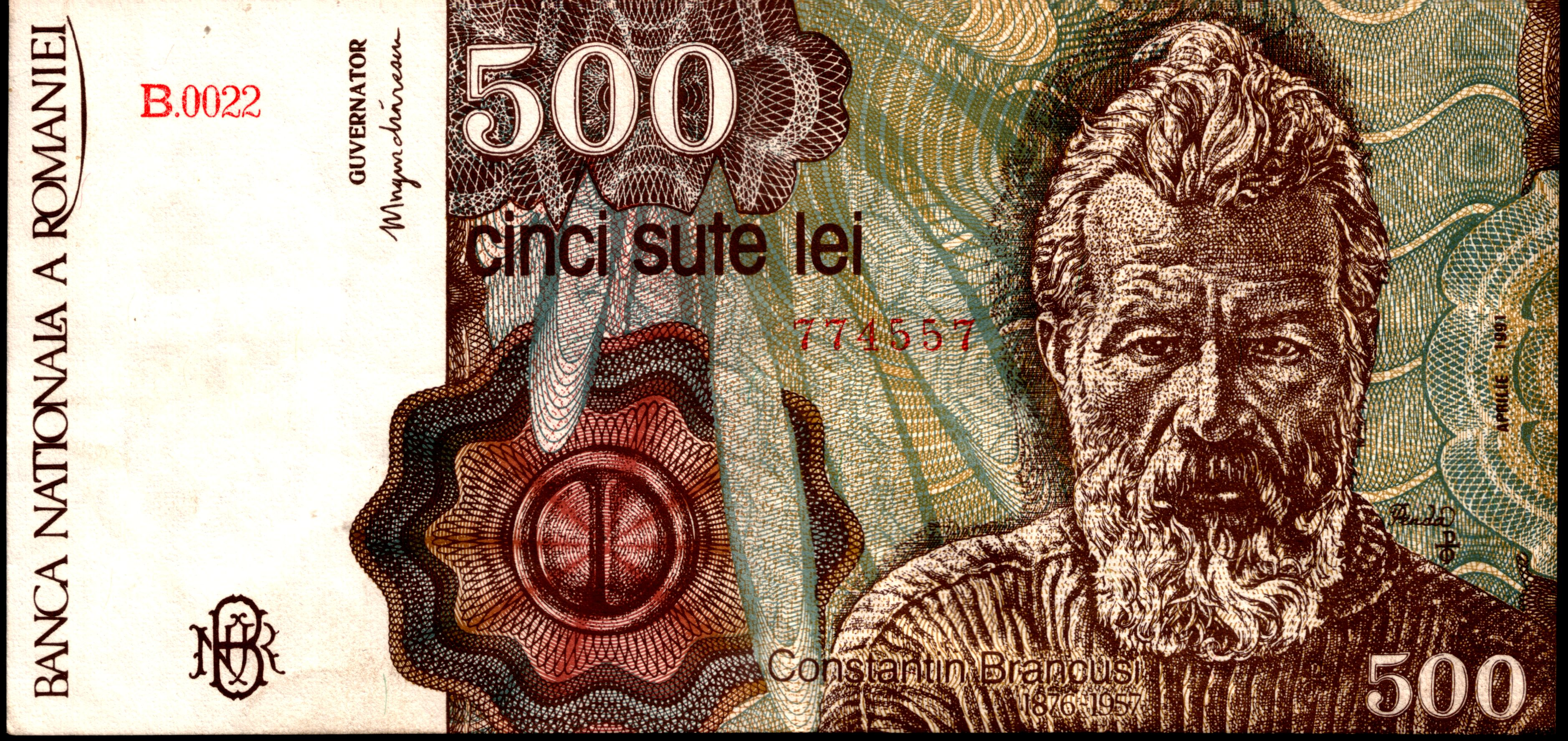
Obverse

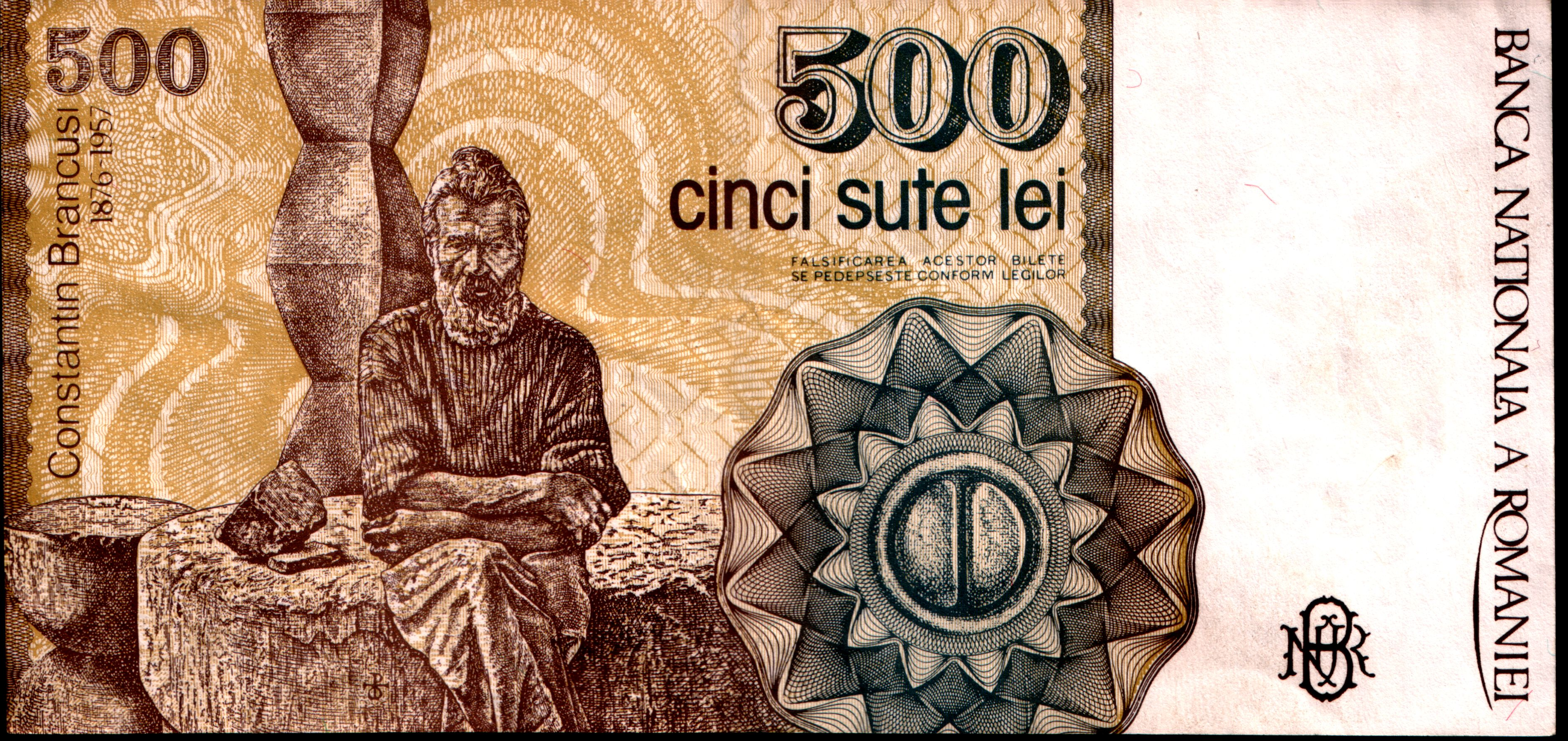
Reverse

1991 500 lei issue

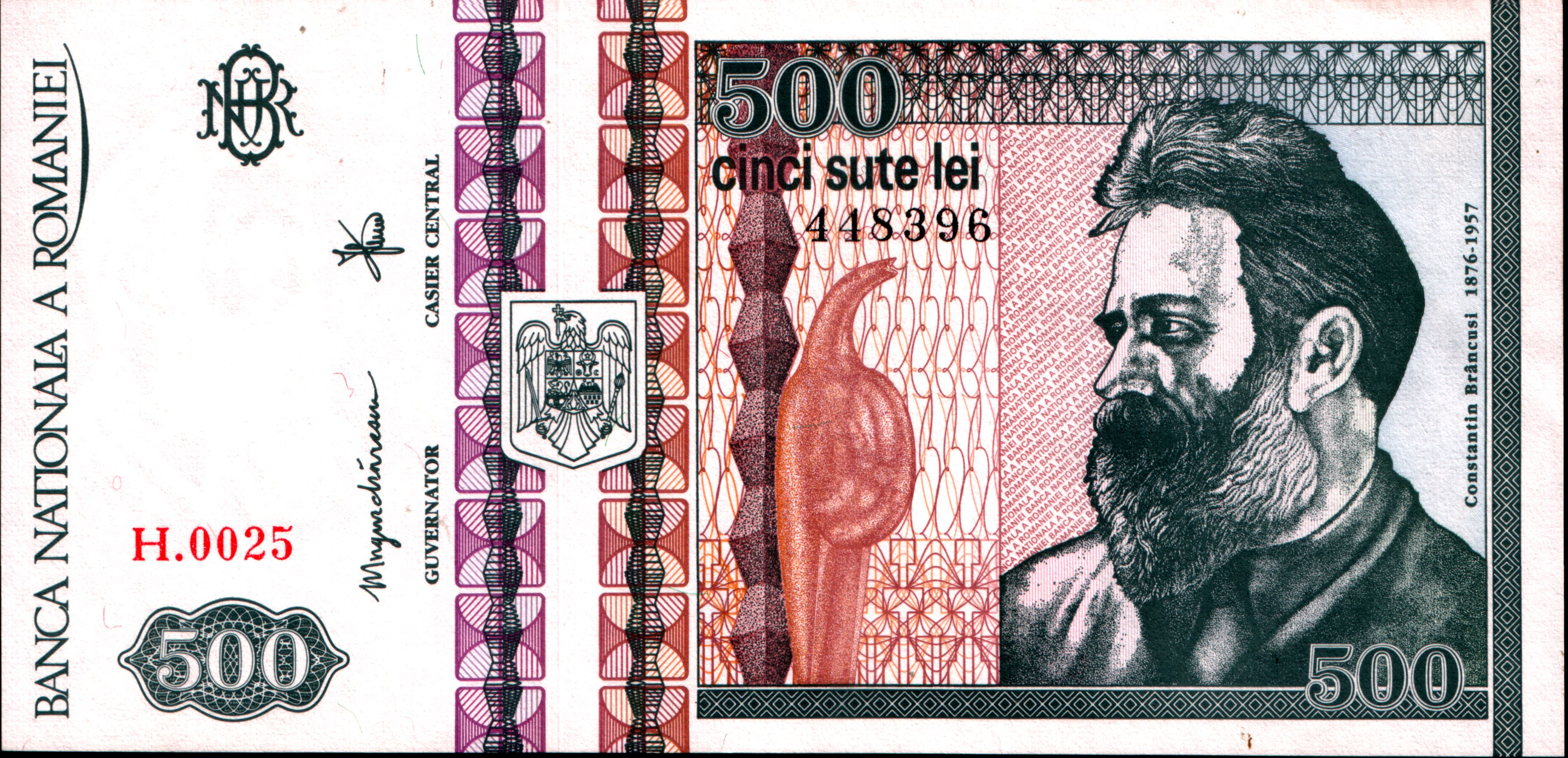
Obverse

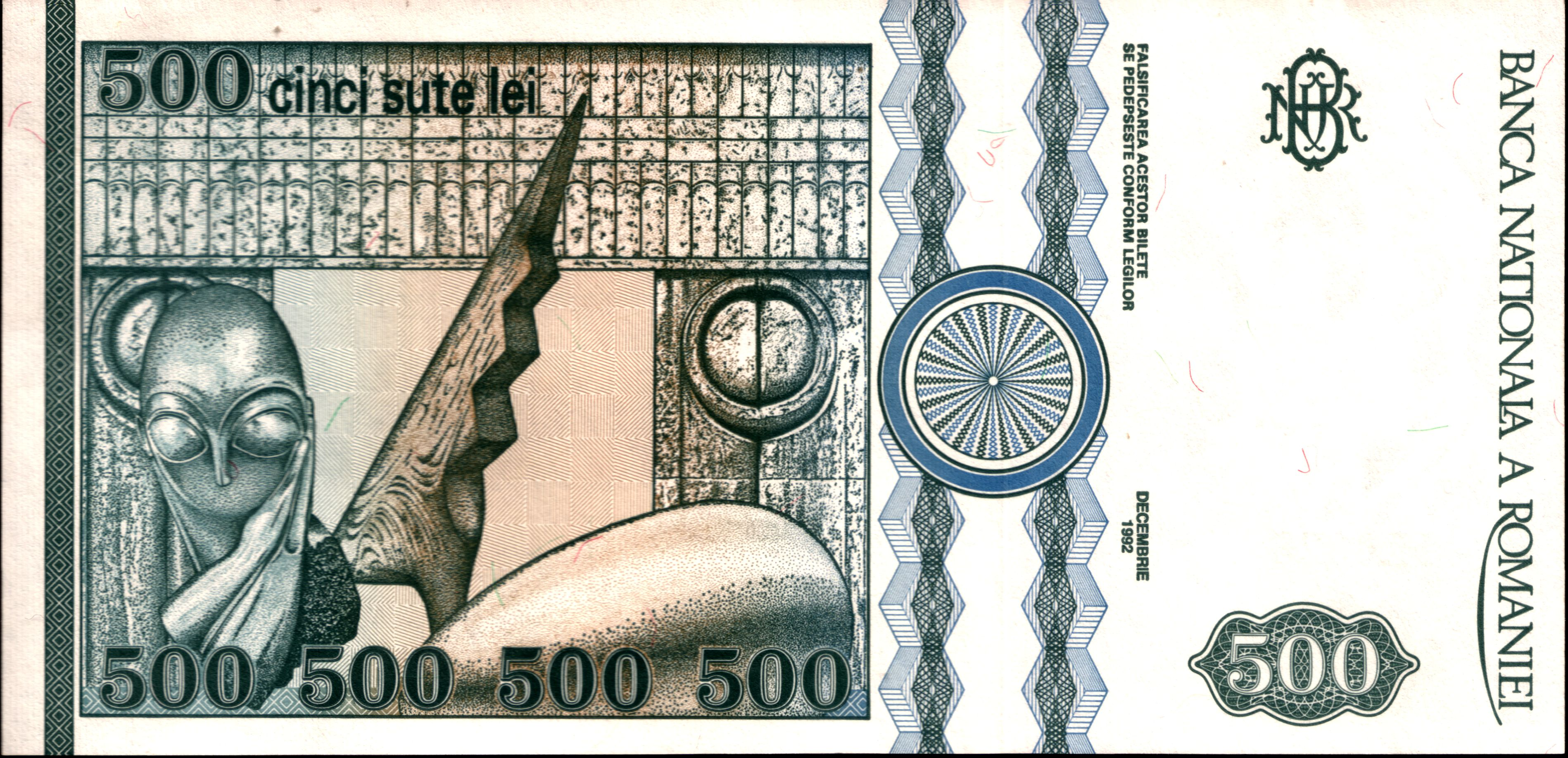
Reverse

1992 500 lei issue
