= Ten bani =

- Romania
- Value: .10 Romanian leu
- Mass: 4.0 g
- Diameter: 20.5 mm
- Thickness: 1.8 mm
- Edge: Intermittently twenty reeds and plain (three times)
- Composition: Nickel-plated steel
- Years of minting: 1867, 1900, 1905-1906, 1952-1956, 2005-present

Obverse
- Design: 'ROMANIA', Coat of arms, eight four-pointed stars, year of minting

Reverse
- Design: 10 BANI
- Design date: 2004/2005

The ten-bani coin is a coin of the Romanian leu. It was reintroduced on 1 July 2005 and is the second-largest denomination coin in Romania. In addition to Romania, it has been minted in the United Kingdom (1867), Belgium (1900, 1905-1906), Germany (1906) and Russia (1952).

== History ==
=== Principality of Romania ===
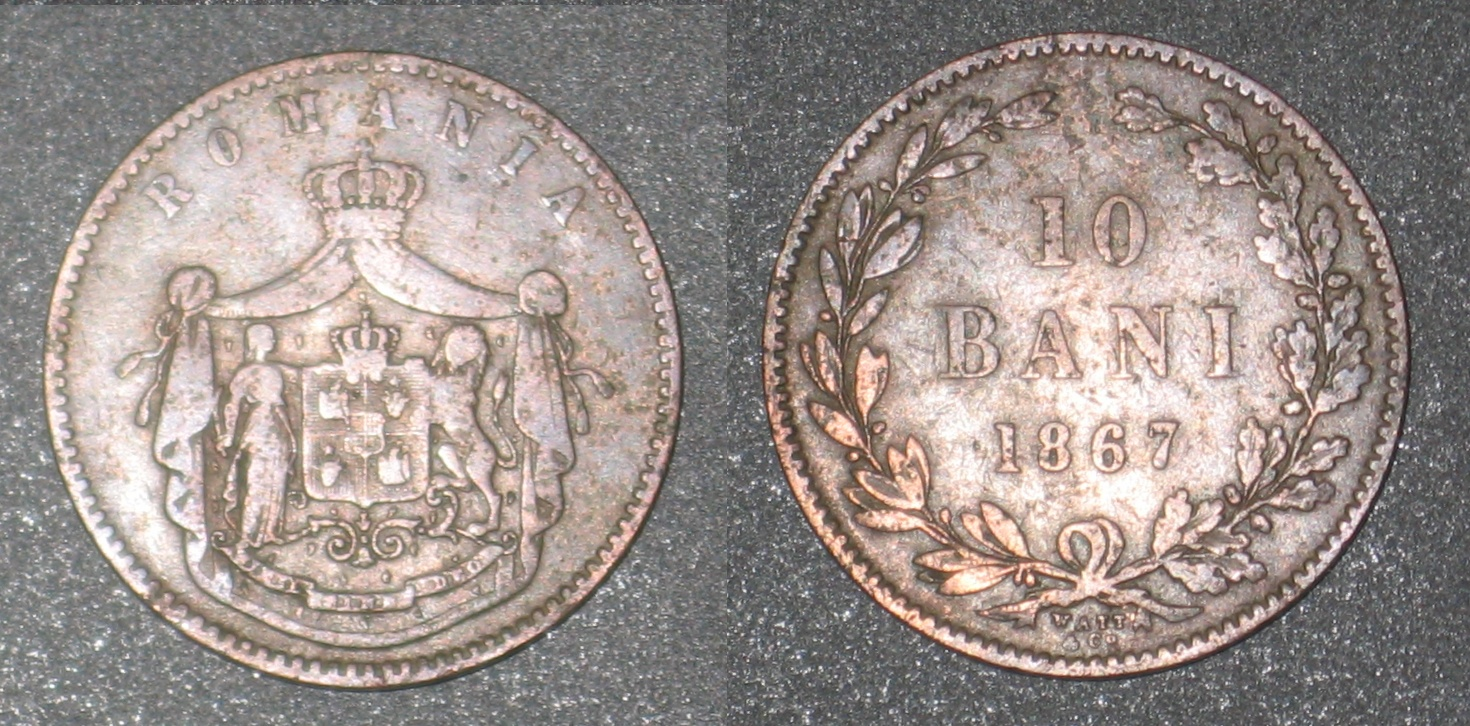
Both sides of a Watt & Co. ten-bani coin minted in 1867 for the Principality of Romania

The first ten-bani coin was struck in 1867 by two different mints in Birmingham, England: Heaton and Watt & Co. The coin measured 30mm in diameter and weighed 10g. It was composed of 95% copper, 4% tin and 1% zinc. The obverse featured the name of the country and its coat of arms. The reverse featured the denomination within a laurel branch and oak branch. The denomination within the wreath read 10 BANI and 1867. Each mint struck 12.5 million of the coin. Watt & Co. used the mintmark WATT & Co below the wreath while Heaton used one of HEATON. The coins entered circulation on 1 January 1868.

=== Kingdom of Romania ===
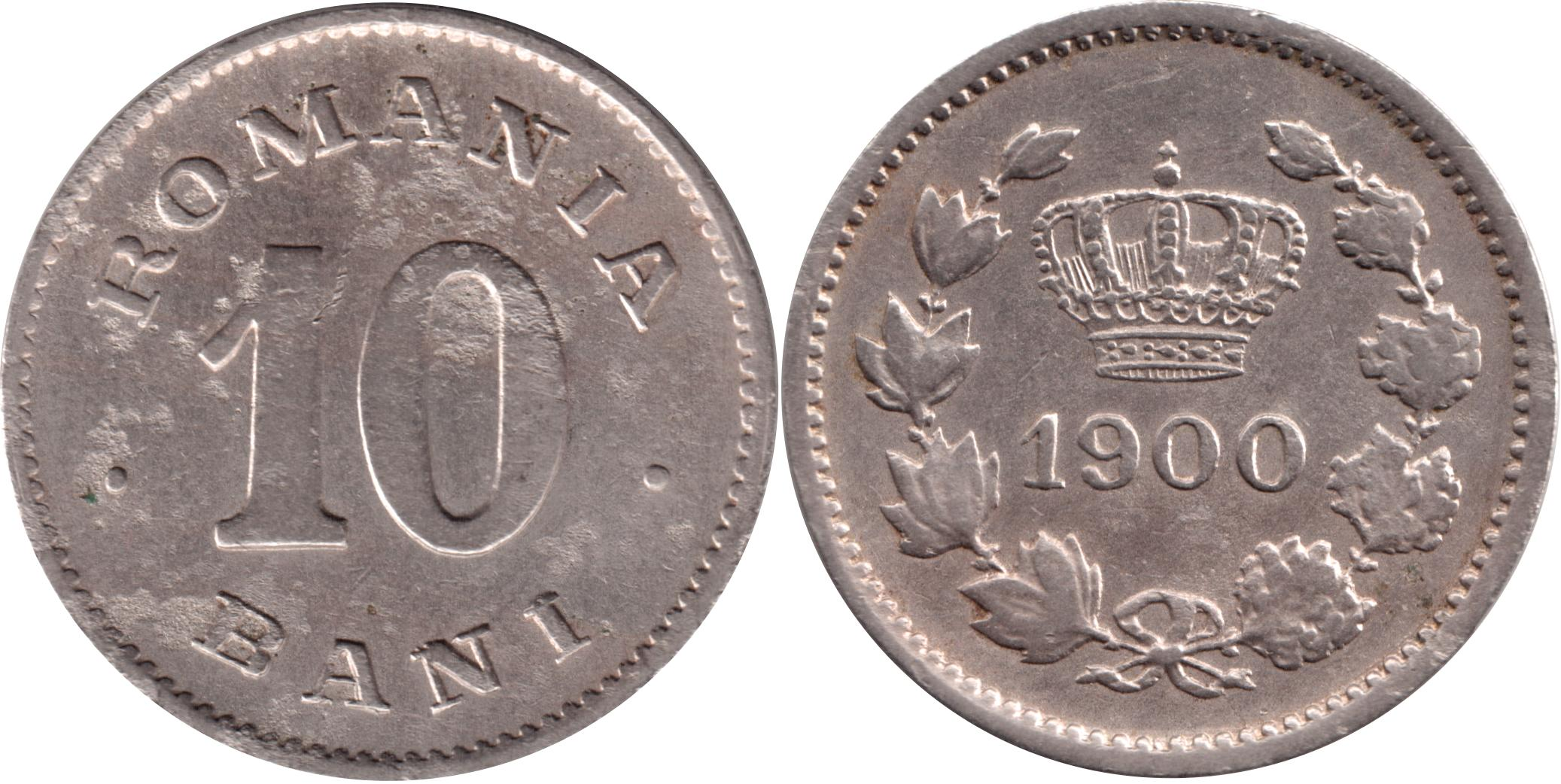
10 bani coin from 1900

A second ten-bani coin was struck only in 1900, in Brussels, Belgium. It measured 19mm in diameter and weighed 3.5g. It was made of 75% copper and 25% nickel. Its obverse featured the crown of Romania above the date within a wreath of a laurel branch and oak branch. The reverse featured the denomination and name of the country. A total of 15 million were issued.

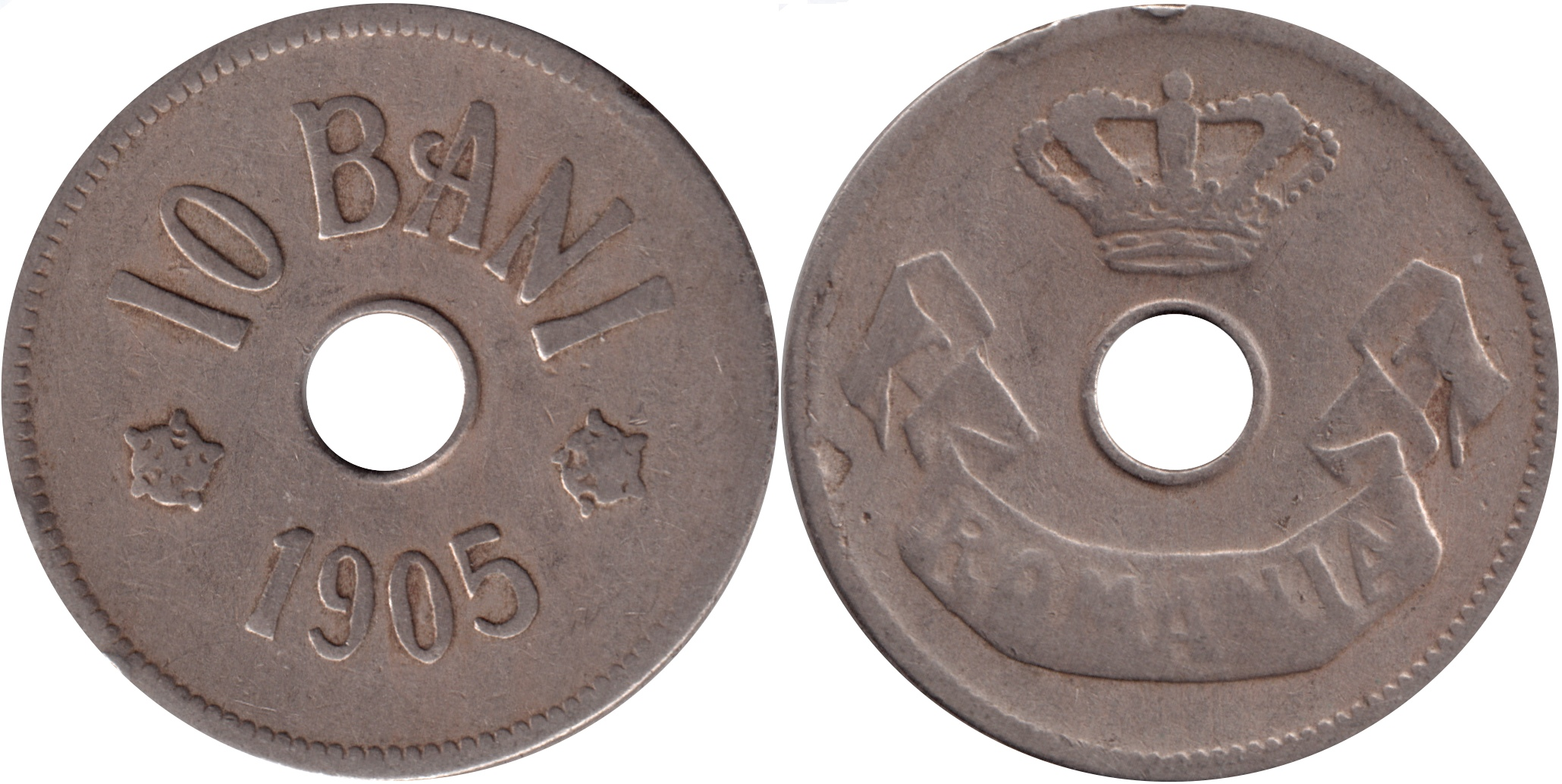
10 bani coin from 1905

The third ten-bani coin entered circulation in 1905 and also saw issue the following year. Although the same diameter and composition, it weighed 0.5g less (4g) due to a hole through the centre. On the obverse, the crown was placed above the hole and the name of the country was written on a scroll underneath. The reverse featured the denomination at the top, a rose on each side of the middle and the year at the bottom. The coins were designed by Anton Scharff, chief engraver at the Austrian Mint in Vienna. The 10.82 million coins of 1905 were minted exclusively at Brussels while in 1906 17 million from Hamburg, Germany supplemented 24.18 million from Brussels. The Hamburg-struck coins feature a 'J' mintmark below the scroll on the obverse while those of Brussels are without a mintmark.

=== People's Republic of Romania ===
The denomination returned in 1952 under communist rule. The new coin was 17.5mm in diameter and weighed 1.8g. It was composed of 80% copper and 10%% aluminium. The obverse featured Romania's communist coat of arms with the inscription around of REPUBLICA POPULARA ROMANA (Romanian People's Republic). The reverse had the denomination and year in plain type in an oak wreath. The coin was struck in Moscow in Soviet Russia and 37.9 million were issued in 1952. In 1953 a star was added to the top of the coat of arms to make them similar to those of other communist nations and minting switched to Bucharest, Romania's capital, which produced 1.6 million. While the weight remained the same, 0.5mm was taken off the diameter. The coins minted in 1955 and 1956 were 17.5mm, and the inscription used the word ROMINA instead of ROMANA. In 1955 4.1 million were minted and the following year 18.4 million.

=== Post-People's Republic ===
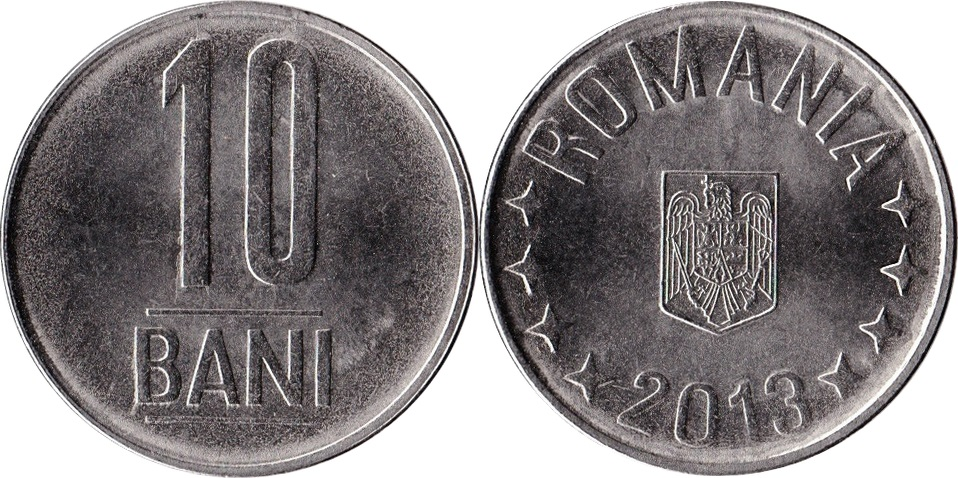
10 bani coin from 2013

In the Socialist Republic of Romania (proclaimed 1965) ten-bani coins were replaced with fifteen-bani coins. Following the return of democracy to Romania in 1990, hyperinflation took place which made bani coins obsolete. However, on 1 July 2005, Romania redenominated its currency at 10,000 old lei to 1 new leu. The 1,000 lei coin, in use since 2000, was replaced by the new ten-bani. Early issues of the coin, from its first year 2005, have a diameter 0.1mm narrower than the official measurements.
