= Romanian leu =

Currency of Romania

leu românesc (Romanian)
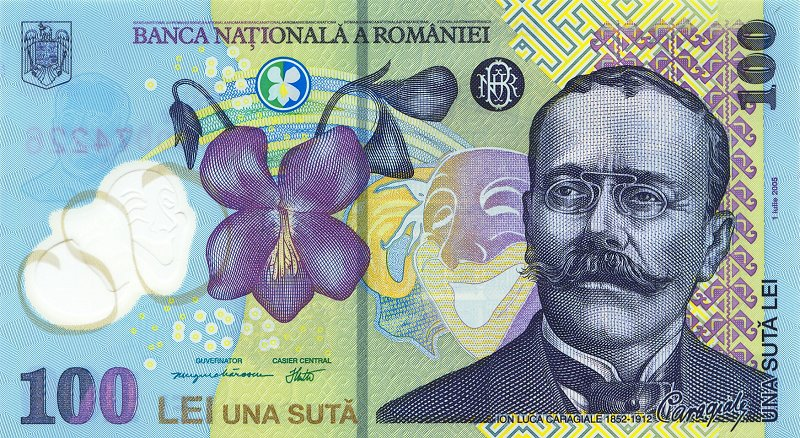
100 lei banknote (obverse)
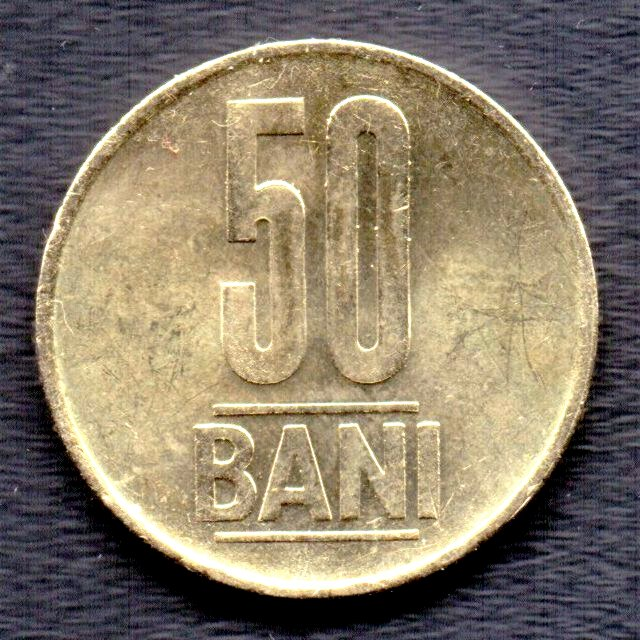
50 bani coin (obverse)

ISO 4217
- Code: RON (numeric: 946) earlier: ROK, ROL
- Subunit: 0.01

Units of account
- Plural: lei
- Subunit
- 1/100: ban
- Plural
- ban: bani

Denominations
- Banknotes
- Freq. used: 1 leu, 5 lei, 10 lei, 20 lei, 50 lei, 100 lei, 200 lei
- Rarely used: 500 lei
- Coins
- Freq. used: 5 bani, 10 bani, 50 bani
- Rarely used: 1 ban

Demographics
- Date of introduction: 22 April 1867 (159 years ago)
- User(s): Romania

Issuance
- Central bank: National Bank of Romania
- Website: www.bnr.ro
- Printer: National Bank of Romania
- Website: www.bnr.ro
- Mint: Monetăria Statului
- Website: www.monetariastatului.ro

Valuation
- Inflation: 9.8% (Dec. 2025)

The Romanian leu (Romanian pronunciation: [lew], plural lei [lej]; ISO code: RON; numeric code: 946) is the currency of Romania. It is subdivided into 100 bani (Romanian pronunciation: [banʲ], singular: ban [ban]), a word that also means "money" in the Romanian language.

== Etymology ==
The name of the currency means "lion", and is derived from the Dutch thaler (leeuwendaalder "lion thaler/dollar"). The Dutch leeuwendaalder was imitated in several German and Italian cities. These coins circulated in Romania, Moldova and Bulgaria and gave their name to their respective currencies: the Romanian leu, the Moldovan leu and the Bulgarian lev.

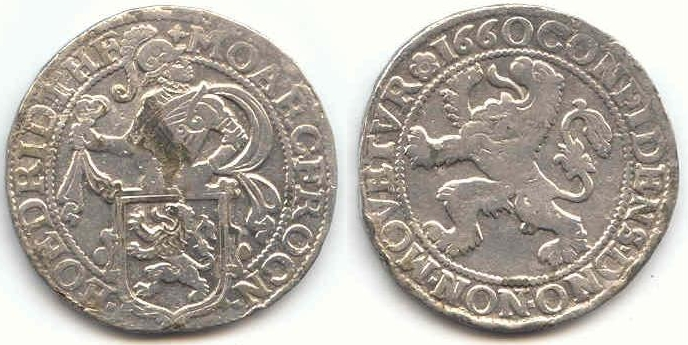
Dutch Thaler, depicting a lion, the origin of the Romanian "Leu"

== History ==
=== First leu (ROP): 1867–1947 ===
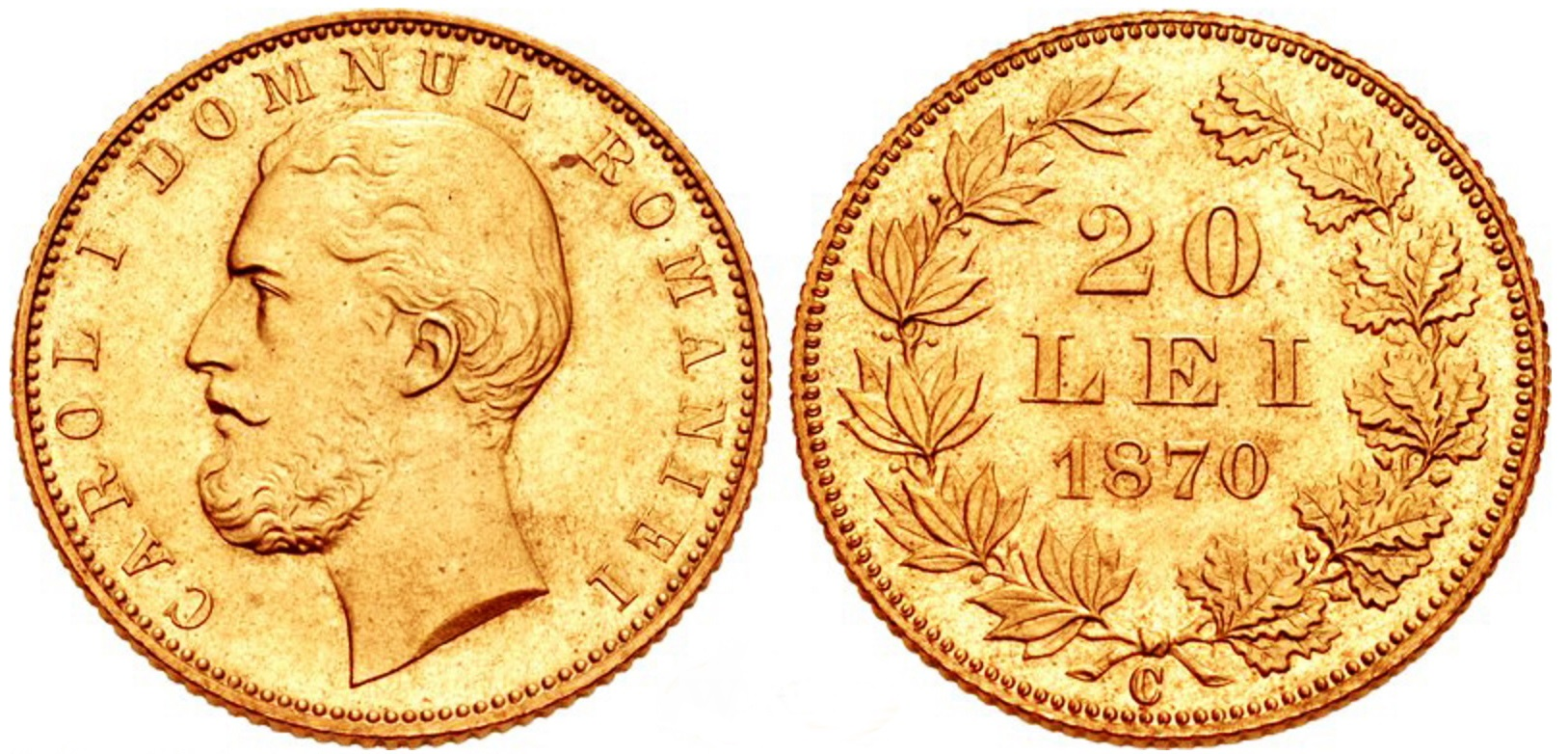
20 lei gold coin from 1870 (21mm diameter, 6.43g weight)

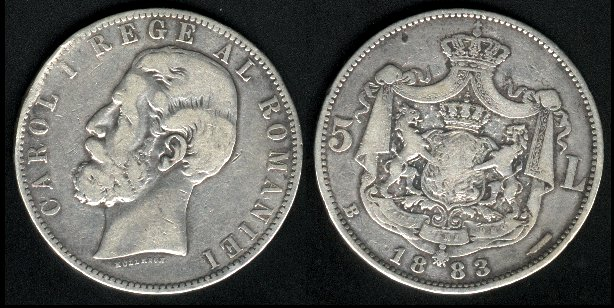
5 lei coin minted in 1883

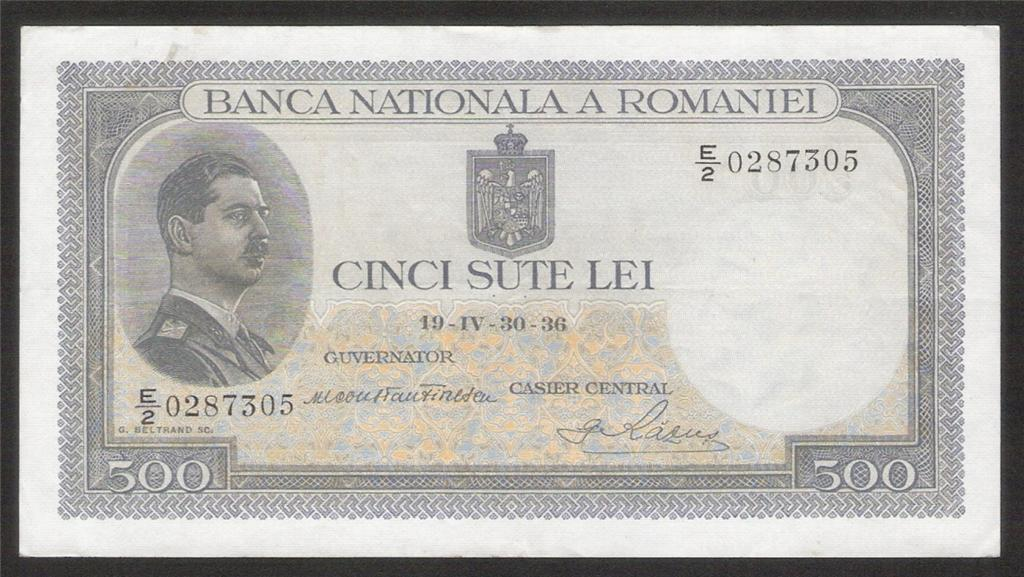
500-leu banknote of 1936, King Carol II of Romania

In 1860, the Domnitor Alexandru Ioan Cuza attempted to create a national românul ("the Romanian") and the romanat; however, the project was not approved by the Ottoman Empire.

On 22 April 1867, a bimetallic currency was adopted, with the leu equal to 5 grams of 83.5% silver or 0.29032 grams of gold. The first leu coin was minted in Romania in 1870.

Before 1878 the silver Russian ruble was valued so highly as to drive the native coins out of circulation. Consequently, in 1889, Romania unilaterally joined the Latin Monetary Union and adopted a gold standard. Silver coins were legal tender only up to 50 lei. All taxes and customs dues were to be paid in gold and, owing to the small quantities issued from the Romanian mint, foreign gold coins were current, especially French 20-franc pieces (equal at par to 20 lei), Ottoman lira (22.70 lei), Russian rubles (20.60 lei) and British sovereigns (25.22 lei).

Romania left the gold standard in 1914 and the leu's value fell. The exchange rate was pegged at 167.20 lei to US$1 on 7 February 1929, US$1 = 135.95 lei on 5 November 1936, US$1 = 204.29 lei on 18 May 1940, and US$1 = 187.48 lei on 31 March 1941. During Romania's World War II alliance with Nazi Germany, the leu was pegged to the reichsmark at a rate of 49.50 lei to RM 1, falling to 59.5 lei = RM 1 in April 1941. During Soviet occupation, the exchange rate was 1 ruble to 100 lei. After the war, the value of the currency fell dramatically and the National Bank issued a new leu, which was worth 20,000 old lei.

=== Second leu (ROS): 1947–1952 ===
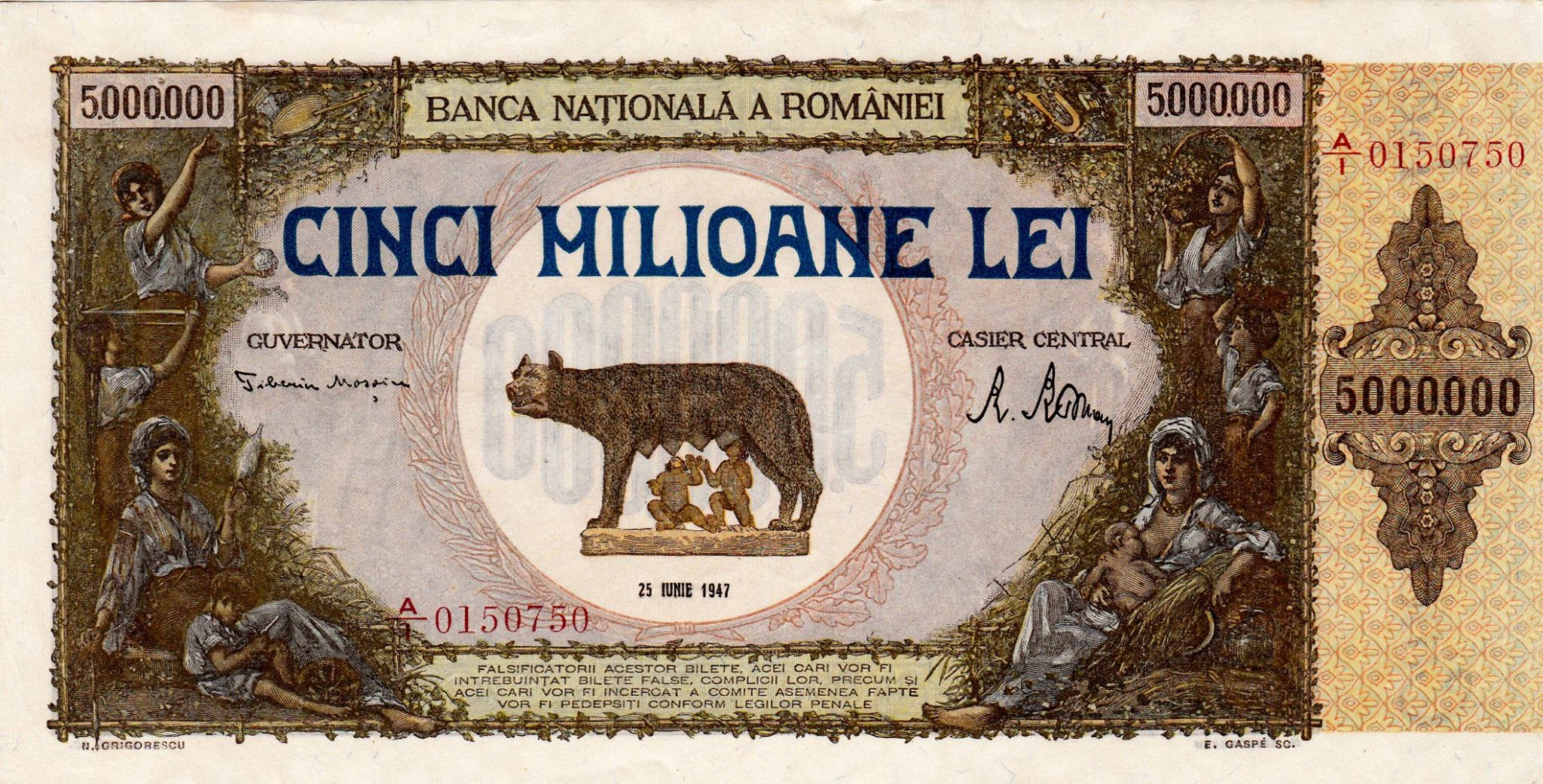
A 5,000,000-lei banknote issued in 1947, the highest denomination ever issued.

A revaluation ("Great stabilization", marea stabilizare) took place on 15 August 1947, replacing the old leu at a rate of 20,000 old lei = 1 stabilized leu. No advance warning was given and there were limits for the sums to be converted in the new currency: 5 million old lei for farmers and 3 million old lei for workers and pensioners.

Out of the 48.5 billion old lei in circulation, only around half were changed to stabilized lei. The most affected was the middle and upper classes, who were later also affected by the nationalization of 1948. At the time of its introduction, 150 new lei equalled 1 US dollar.

=== Third leu (ROL): 1952–2005 ===
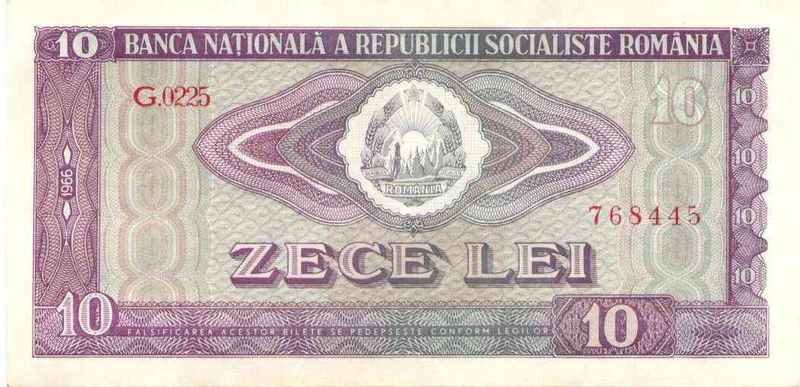
A 10-lei banknote issued in 1966

On 28 January 1952, another new leu was introduced. Unlike the previous revaluation, different rates were employed for different kinds of exchange (cash, bank deposits, debts etc.) and different amounts. These rates ranged from 20 to 400 "old lei" for one "new" leu. Again, no advance warning was given before the reform took place.

Between 1970 and 1989, the official exchange rate was fixed by the government through law. This exchange rate was used by the government to calculate the value of foreign trade, but foreign currency was not available to be bought and sold by private individuals. Owning or attempting to buy or sell foreign currency was a criminal offence, punishable with a prison sentence that could go up to ten years (depending on the amount of foreign currency found under one's possession). International trade was therefore considered as part of another economic circuit than domestic trade, and given greater priority.

This inflexibility and the existence of surplus money due to constant economic decline in the 1980s, mixed with the need for more foreign currency and the refusal of the Ceaușescu regime to accept inflation as a phenomenon in order to attain convertibility, led to one of the greatest supply side crises in Romanian history, culminating with the introduction of partial food rationing in 1980 and full rationing for all basic foods in 1986/87. This was a major factor in growing discontent with Ceaușescu, and contributed in part to the fall of the Communist regime in 1989.

In the post-communist period, there has been a switch in the material used for banknotes and coins. Banknotes have switched from special paper to special plastic, while coins switched from aluminum to more common coin alloys (probably partly due to technical limitations of coin-operated vending machines). The transition has been gradual for both, but much faster for the banknotes which are currently all made of plastic. There has been a period in which all banknotes were made of plastic and all coins were made of aluminum, a very distinctive combination.

After the downfall of communism in the 1990s, inflation ran high due to reform failures, the legalization of owning foreign currency in 1990, reaching rates as high as 300% per year in 1993. By September 2003, one euro was exchanged for more than 40,000 lei, this being its peak value. Following a number of successful monetary policies in the late 1990s and early 2000s, the situation became gradually more stable, with single-digit inflation in 2005.

The Romanian leu was briefly the world's least valued currency unit, from January (when the Turkish lira dropped six zeros) to July 2005. However, the 1,000,000 lei banknote was not the highest Romanian denomination ever; a 5,000,000 lei note had been issued in 1947.

=== Fourth leu (RON): 2005–present ===
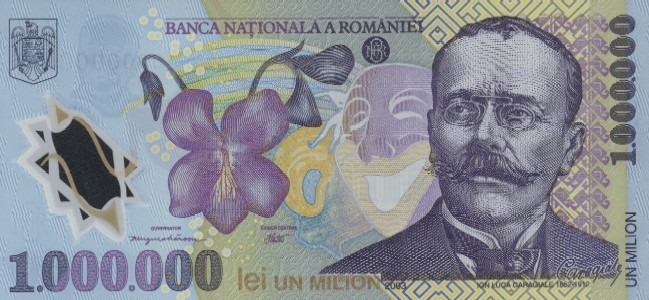
1,000,000 old lei
168 mm × 78 mm

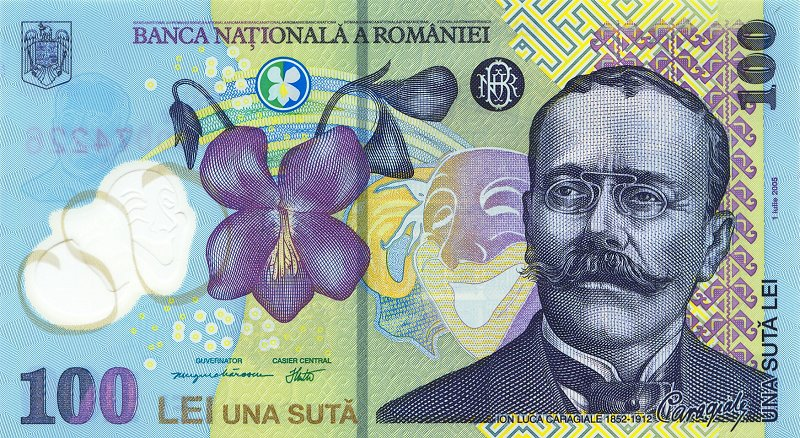
100 new lei
147 mm × 82 mm

Same design, different sizes. The images are to scale.

On 1 July 2005, the leu was revalued at the rate of 10,000 "old" lei (ROL) for one "new" leu (RON), thus psychologically bringing the purchasing power of the leu back in line with those of other major Western currencies. The term chosen for the action was "denominare", similar to the English term "redenomination". The adjustment was a difficult one for shoppers and many ATMs were inoperable and in need of reprogramming. The old ROL currency banknotes remained in circulation until 31 December 2006 (coins remained in circulation only until 31 December 2005), but all accounts were converted starting 1 July 2005. There is no conversion time limit between the currencies. Retailers had to display prices in both old and new currency from 1 March 2005 until 30 June 2006. The appreciation of the leu during 2005 was about 20% against a basket of major currencies.

As of 2006, the revaluation was a potential source of confusion, especially to visitors, since both old and new currency values were commonly quoted. When written, the very large amounts in old currency are usually obvious, but in speaking inhabitants might refer to an amount of 5 new lei as simply "fifty" in reference to its value of 50,000 old lei. As of 2020, it is still common to call 100 lei "un milion" or one million and 500 lei "cinci milioane" or five million.

=== Speculation about joining the Eurozone ===
In 2014, Romania's Convergence Report set a target date of 1 January 2019 for euro adoption. In April 2014, Romania had met four out of the seven criteria for accession to the Eurozone. In recent years, however, Romania had backslided regarding the adopting of the euro; the 2020 Convergence Report concluded that Romania does not meet any of the four economic criteria necessary for this process. In February 2021, then-Prime Minister Florin Cîțu stated that Romania could join the Eurozone in 2027 or 2028, although Romanian economist Florin Georgescu announced in December 2021 that this date had been delayed to 2029. In August 2026, the Minister of Investments and European Projects Dragoș Pîslaru stated that 2032 as a possible key target for Romania's entry into the eurozone. In september 2026, the Minister Finance Alexandru Nazare stated that Romania aims to join the eurozone by 2035. According to him, Romania should exit the excessive deficit procedure (EDP) by 2030, with a few additional years subsequently required to prepare for euro adoption.

== Coins ==
The size and composition of coins changed frequently after the introduction of the currency.

=== First leu ===
In 1867, copper 1, 2, 5 and 10 bani were issued, with gold 20 lei (known as poli after the French Napoleons) first minted the next year. These were followed, between 1870 and 1873, by silver 50 bani, 1 and 2 lei. Silver 5 lei were added in 1880. Uniquely, the 1867 issue used the spelling 1 banu rather than 1 ban.

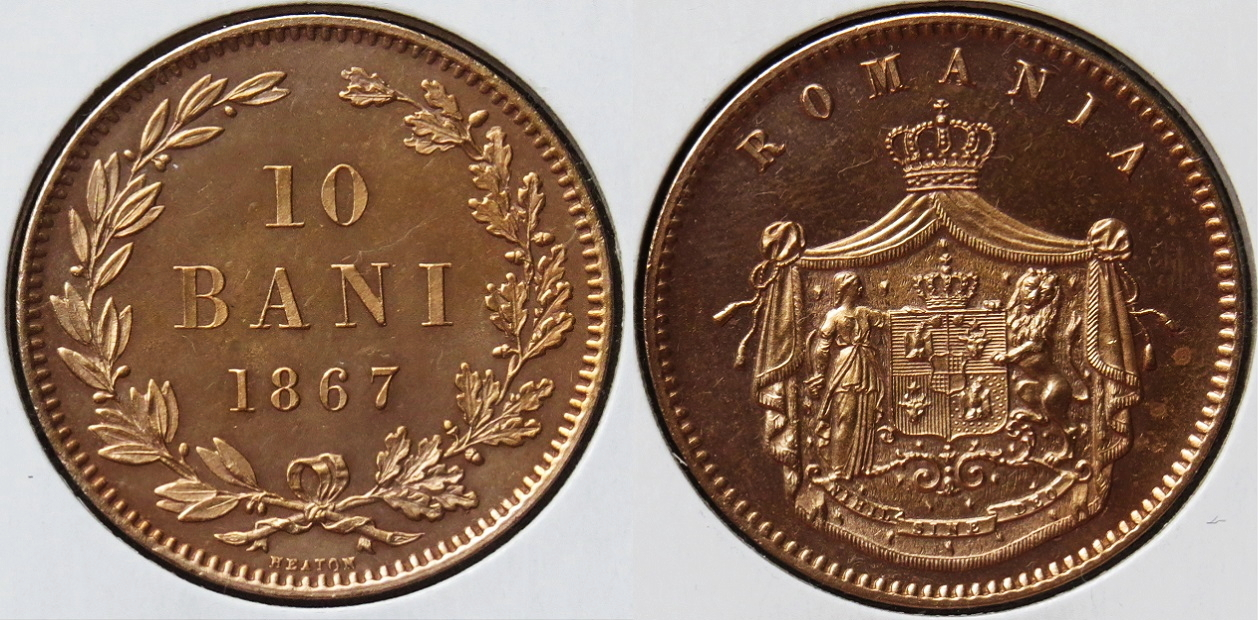
10 bani 1867 proof copper coin (30mm, 10g)

In 1900, cupronickel 5, 10, and 20 ban coins were introduced, with holed versions following in 1905. The production of coins ceased in 1914, recommencing in 1921 with aluminum 25 and 50 ban pieces. Cupronickel 1 and 2 lei coins were introduced in 1924, followed by nickel brass 5, 10, and 20 lei in 1930. In 1932, silver 100 lei coins were issued. However, inflation meant that in 1935, smaller silver 250 lei coins were introduced with nickel 100 lei coins being issued in 1936, followed by nickel 50 lei in 1937.

In 1941 and 1942, zinc 2, 5, and 20 lei coins were introduced, together with silver 200 and 500 lei. Nickel-clad-steel 100 lei followed in 1943, with brass 200, and 500 lei issued in 1945. In 1946 and 1947, postwar inflation brought the exchange rate even lower, and a new coinage was issued consisting of aluminum 500 lei, brass 2,000, and 10,000 lei, and silver 25,000, and 100,000 lei.

=== Second leu ===
Coins were issued in 1947 after the revaluation in denominations of 50 bani, 1, 2, and 5 lei and depicted the portrait of King Michael I. This coin series was brief, preceded by the king's abdication less than a year later and replaced following the establishment of communist administration in Romania in 1948, reissued gradually in denominations of 1, 2, 5, and 20 lei in nickel-brass alloy, and later in aluminum. All second leu coins were discontinued and devalued in late 1952.

=== Third leu ===
Coins were first issued in 1952 in denominations of 1, 3, 5, 10, 25, and 50 bani, with aluminum bronze for 1, 3, and 5 bani, and cupronickel for 10, 25, and 50 bani. These coins featured the state arms and name "Republica Populară Romînă".

In 1960, a new series of coins was issued in denominations of 5, 15, & 25 bani and 1 and 3 lei struck in nickel-plated steel. Starting in 1966, the name on all coins was changed to "Republica Socialistă România" following the ascent of Nicolae Ceaușescu, though all pre-1966 coins of these denominations remained valid. In 1975, the composition of 5 and 15 bani coins was changed to aluminum, and the 25 bani followed suit in 1982. In 1978, an aluminum 5 lei coin was introduced. These denominations remained in use until 1991, particularly the 5 lei, following the lifting of state-mandated exchange rates and price controls.

In 1991, a new coin series with post-communist iconography and new valuations was released in denominations of 1, 5, 10, 20, 50, and 100 lei. These coins gradually lost value with inflation, and a new series was introduced in 1998 with an aluminum-magnesium alloy 500 lei and 1,000 and 5,000 lei coins in 2000.

=== Fourth leu ===
The coins that are currently in circulation are one ban, made of brass-plated steel; five bani, made of copper-plated steel; ten bani in nickel-plated steel; and fifty bani in nickel brass. These were first introduced into circulation in 2005 with the fourth revaluation and are all currently valid. There are twelve 50 bani commemorative circulating coins made in 2010, 2011, 2012, 2014, 2015, 2016, 2017, 2018 and 2019.

The current coins of the Romanian leu are by any objective standards of functional austere design, surpassing in lack of decoration even the plainest Communist-era predecessors.

The one ban coin was rarely seen and not in demand by either banks or many retailers; the 'situation' has changed and the coin is not uncommonly found (as of 2015). Supermarkets continue habitually to advertise prices such as 9.99 (lei), and frequently price goods to the precise ban such as 9,47; indeed, as of 2014, very few of the prices displayed at the Carrefour online site (for example) display prices to the nearest 5 or 10 bani. In practice, many retailers round totals to the nearest 5 or 10 bani for cash payments, or even whole leu, although (inter)national supermarket chains generally give exact change. For card payments the exact amount (not rounded) is always charged. The reversion to single ban pricing (and change giving) is perhaps due to the (effective) government drive for shops/businesses to give a receipt, an accurate bon fiscal (to avoid tax evasion) for every transaction. Official notices must be prominently displayed in all shops/restaurants that an accurate receipt must be given.

== Banknotes ==
=== First leu ===
1917 fractional leu
10 bani	25 bani	50 bani

In 1877, state notes were introduced in denominations of 5, 10, 20, 50, 100, and 500 lei. In 1880, these notes were overstamped for issue by the Banca Națională a României, which began to issue regular notes in 1881 in denominations of 20, 100, and 1,000 lei.

In 1914, five leu notes were reintroduced, followed by one and two leu notes in 1915 and 500 lei in 1916. The Ministry of Finance issued very small-sized notes for 10, 25 and 50 bani in 1917. 5,000 lei notes were introduced in 1940, followed by 10,000 and 100,000 lei in 1945 and 1,000,000 and 5,000,000 lei in 1947. In 1945, the Ministry of Finance issued 20 and 100 leu notes to replace those of the National Bank.

=== Second leu ===
In 1947, the Ministry of Finance introduced 20 lei notes and Banca Națională a României introduced 100, 500 and 1,000 lei notes. In 1949, Banca Republicii Populare Române took over the production of paper money and issued 500 and 1,000 lei notes.

=== Third leu ===
In 1952, the Ministry of Finance introduced notes for 1, 3, and 5 lei, and the Banca Republicii Populare Române introduced 10, 25 and 100 leu notes. In 1966, the Banca Națională a Republicii Socialiste România took over the production of all paper money, issuing notes for 1, 3, 5, 10, 25, 50 and 100 lei.

In 1991, 500 and 1,000 leu notes were introduced, followed by 200 and 5,000 leu notes in 1992, 10,000 lei in 1994, 50,000 lei in 1996, 100,000 lei in 1998, 500,000 lei in 2000 and 1,000,000 lei in 2003. There was also a commemorative 2,000 lei note introduced in 1999 celebrating the total solar eclipse that occurred on 11 August 1999. The final issues of the 2,000, 10,000, 50,000, 100,000, 500,000, and 1,000,000 lei were polymer notes.

Notes in circulation at the revaluation were:

- 10,000 lei (became 1 leu)
- 50,000 lei (became RON 5)
- 100,000 lei (became RON 10)
- 500,000 lei (became RON 50)
- 1,000,000 lei (became RON 100)

=== Fourth series ===
In 2005, polymer notes were introduced for 1 leu, 5, 10, 50, 100 and RON 500. RON 200 notes were added in 2006. The designs of the 1 leu, 5, 10, 50, and RON 100 notes are based on those of the earlier 10,000, 50,000, 100,000, 500,000, and 1,000,000 leu notes which they replaced. The RON 10 note was redesigned in November 2008 (most of the graphic elements are identical, some of the safety elements were changed, making its safety features similar to the lower-valued notes for 1 leu and RON 5). The highest-value coin (in general circulation) is 50 bani (around 15 cents US or 9 pence sterling); the 1 leu note (there is no coin) has, therefore, a value of (approximately) 25 cents US or 18 pence sterling, or around 23 euro cents.

In preparation for Romania joining the Eurozone, banknotes of the fourth leu are of equal size to Euro banknotes.

The RON 20 banknote was introduced by the National Bank of Romania in November 2021.

=== List of current banknotes ===
Current series
Value	Image		Size		Main Color	Description		Earlier Series in circulation	2018/2021 Series	2026 Series
Value	Obverse	Reverse	Dimensions (mm)	Euro equivalent	Main Color	Obverse	Reverse	Earlier Series in circulation	2018/2021 Series	2026 Series
1 leu			120 × 62	€0.19	Green	Nicolae Iorga and milkweed gentian	Cathedral of Curtea de Argeș, The Wallachian Eagle	Series 2005	Series 2018	Series 2026
5 lei			127 × 67	€0.98	Violet	George Enescu and carnation	Romanian Athenaeum	Series 2005	Series 2018	Series 2026
10 lei			133 × 72	€1.96	Pink and light red	Nicolae Grigorescu and althaea	Traditional house from Oltenia, Nicolae Grigorescu painting Rodica	Series 2005; Series 2008	Series 2018	Series 2026
20 lei			136 x 77	€3.93	Olive green	Ecaterina Teodoroiu and crocus flavus	Mausoleum of Mărășești, Victoria as depicted on the Romanian Victory Medal	Series 2021		Series 2026
50 lei			140 × 77	€9.81	Yellow	Aurel Vlaicu and edelweiss	A Vlaicu II airplane design, eagle head	Series 2005	Series 2018	Series 2026
100 lei			147 × 82	€19.62	Blue	Ion Luca Caragiale and sweet violet	National Theatre of Bucharest (old building), Statue of Ion Luca Caragiale, by Constantin Baraschi	Series 2005	Series 2018	Series 2026
200 lei			150 × 82	€39.26	Brown and orange	Lucian Blaga and poppies	A watermill, The Hamangia Thinker	Series 2006	Series 2018	Series 2026
500 lei			153 × 82	€98.10	Gray and violet	Mihai Eminescu and tilia	Central University Library of Iași, Timpul (the Times) newspaper	Series 2005	Series 2018	Series 2026

== Exchange rates ==
The exchange rate of one Euro in Romanian lei (from 1999)

Current RON exchange rates
From Google Finance:	AUD CAD CHF CNY EUR GBP HKD JPY USD TRY
From Yahoo! Finance:	AUD CAD CHF CNY EUR GBP HKD JPY USD TRY
From XE.com:	AUD CAD CHF CNY EUR GBP HKD JPY USD TRY
From OANDA:	AUD CAD CHF CNY EUR GBP HKD JPY USD TRY

== See also ==
- Economy of Romania
- History of coins in Romania
- Banknotes of the Romanian leu
- Romania and the euro
- List of currencies in Europe
