= One leu =

- Country: Romania
- Value: 1 Romanian leu
- Width: 120 mm
- Height: 62 mm
- Security features: watermark, security thread, transparent window, microprinting, blacklight printing, EURion constellation
- Material used: polymer
- Years of printing: since 2005

Obverse
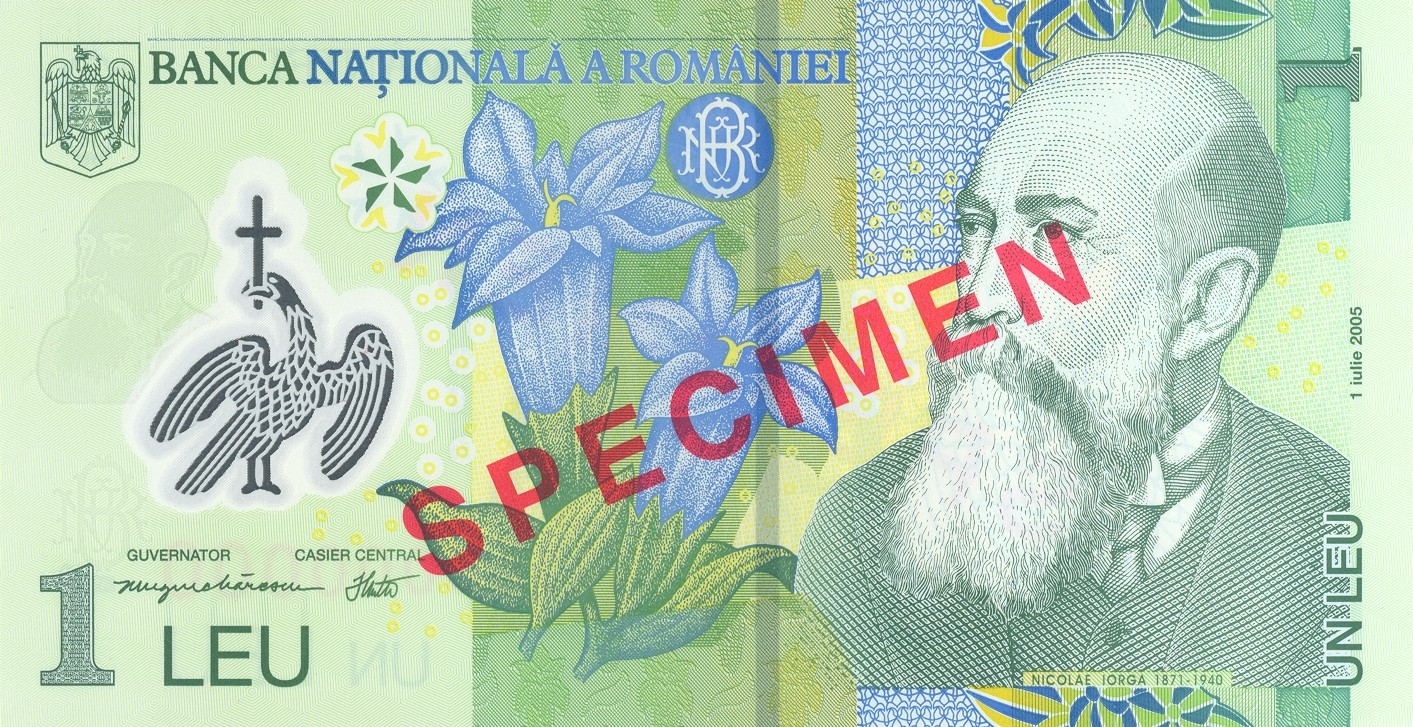
- Design: prof. Nicolae Iorga, Milkweed gentian
- Designer: National Bank of Romania
- Design date: 2005

Reverse
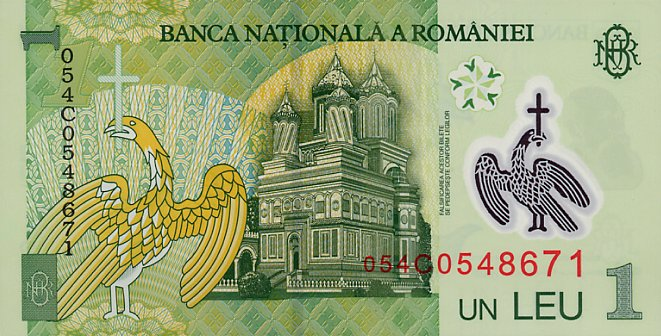
- Design: Curtea de Argeş Cathedral, the Wallachian eagle
- Designer: National Bank of Romania
- Design date: 2005

The current one leu banknote is the smallest circulating denomination af the Romanian leu. It is the same size as the 5 Euro banknote.

The main color of the current banknote is green. It pictures, on the obverse Prime-minister and historian Nicolae Iorga, and on the reverse the Curtea de Argeş Cathedral, which suffered a massive restoration under his Government, and a crossed eagle, the Wallachian traditional heraldic element.

== History ==
In the past, the denomination was also in the coin form, as follows:

First leu (1867–1947)

- coin issues: 1870, 1873 (re-issues: 1874, 1876), 1881, 1884 (re-issue: 1885), 1894 (re-issues: 1900, 1901), 1906 (gold, celebration issue), 1910 (re-issues: 1911, 1912, 1914)
- banknote issue: 1915 (re-issues: 1920, 1937, 1938), 1917 (issued by the Romanian General Bank and circulated in the German occupation area between 1917-1918)
- coin issue: 1924
- banknote re-issue: 1938 (re-issue of the 1915 design)
- coin issue: 1938 (re-issues: 1939, 1940, 1941)
- banknote issue: 1941 (issued by INFINEX and circulated in Romanian administrated Transnistria between 1941-1944)

Second leu (1947–1952)

- coin issues: 1947, 1949 (re-issues: 1950, 1951)

Third leu - ROL (1952–2005)

- banknote issue: 1952
- coin issue: 1963
- banknote issue: 1966
- coin issues: 1966 (actually minted in 1967, re-issue of the 1963 design), 1992, 1993 (re-issues: 1994, 1995, 1996)

Fourth leu - RON (since 2005)

- banknote issue: 2005 (redesigned issue of the former 10.000 lei banknote, whereas 10.000 third lei = 1 fourth leu)

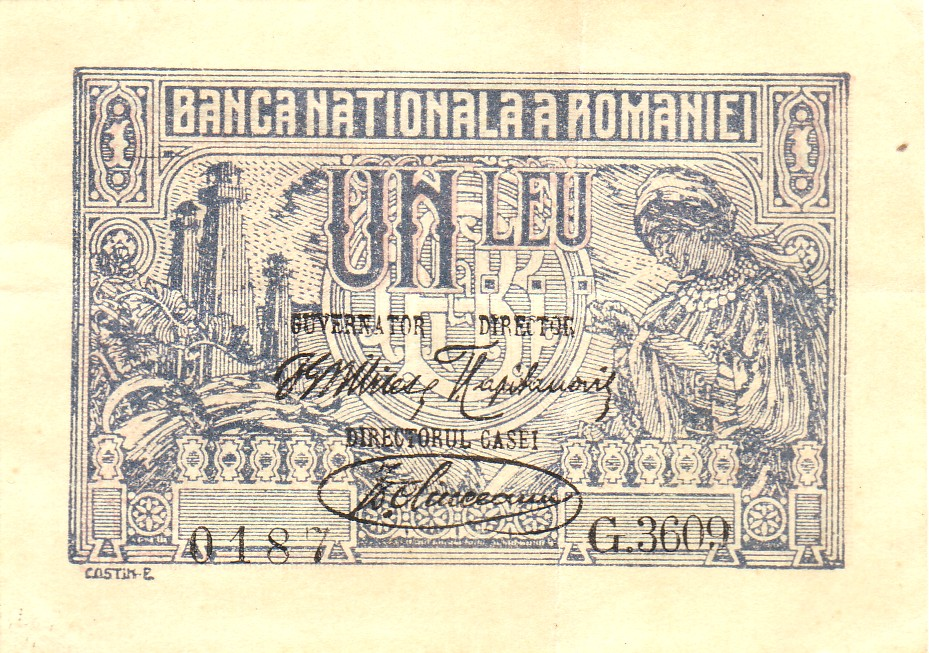
Obverse

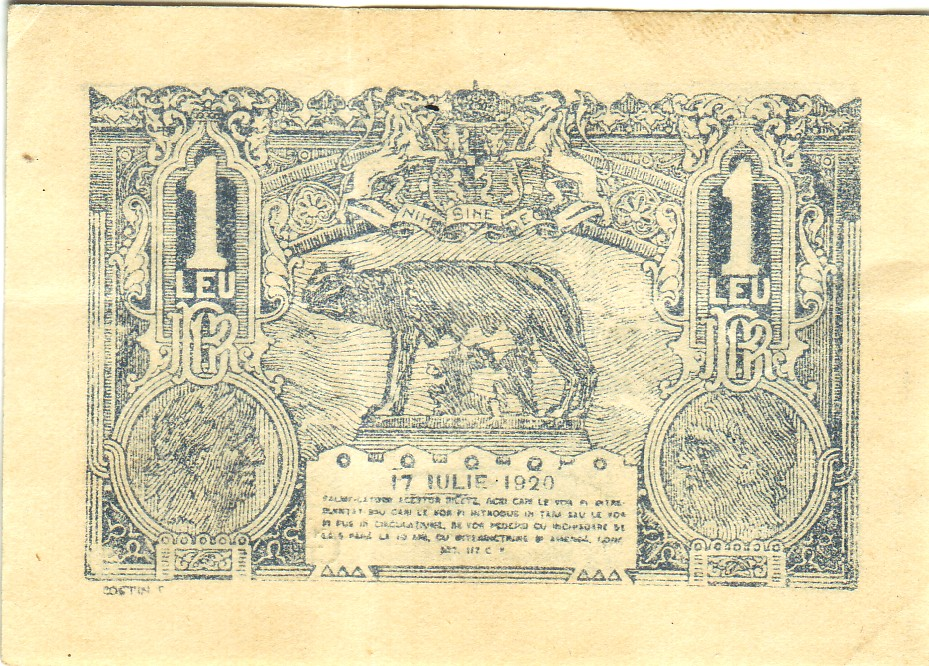
Reverse

17 July 1920 1 leu issue

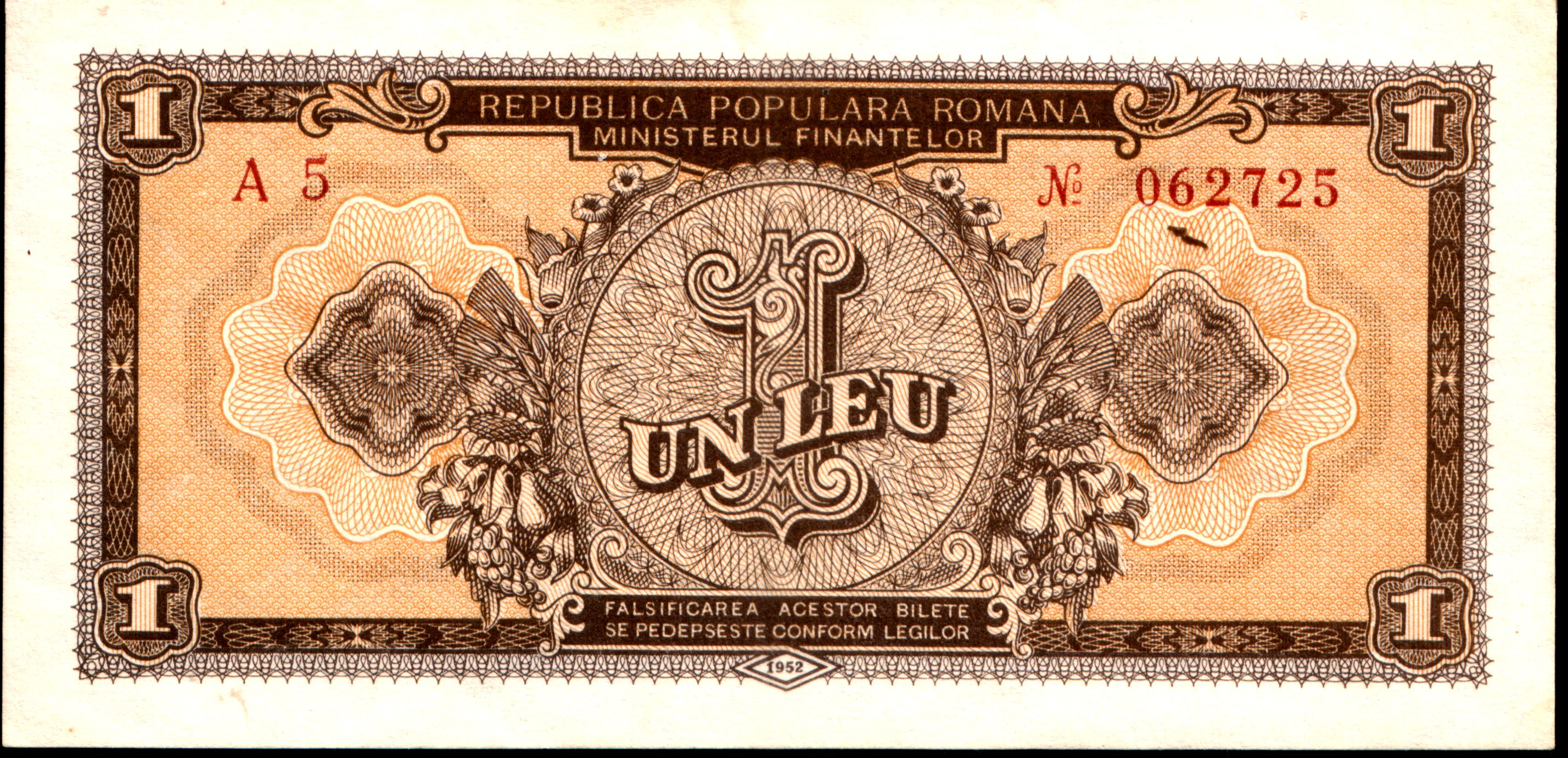
Obverse

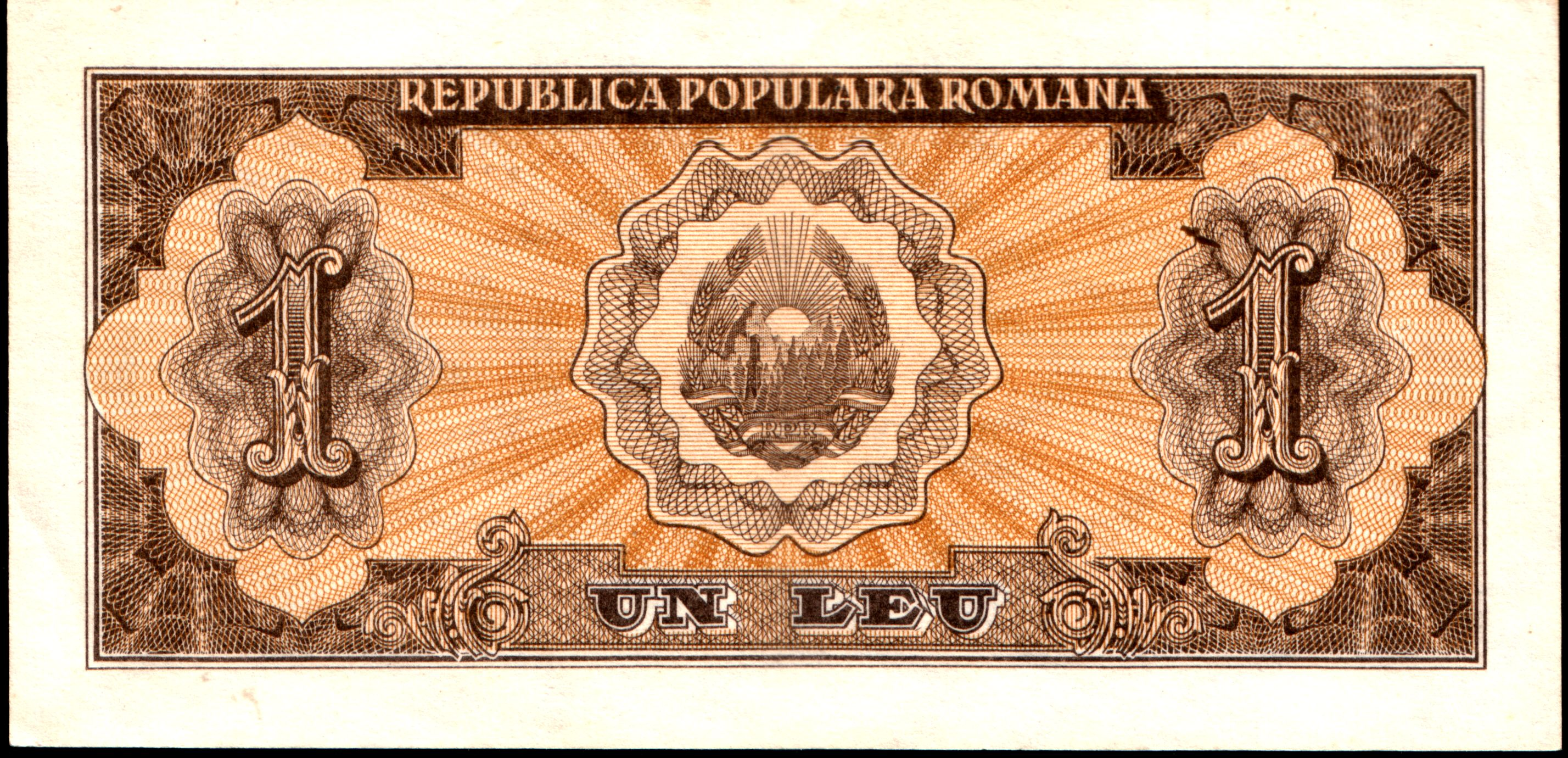
Reverse

1952 1 leu issue

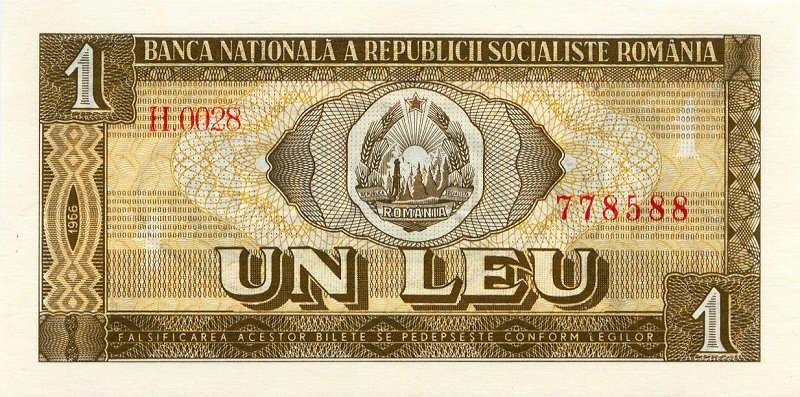
Obverse

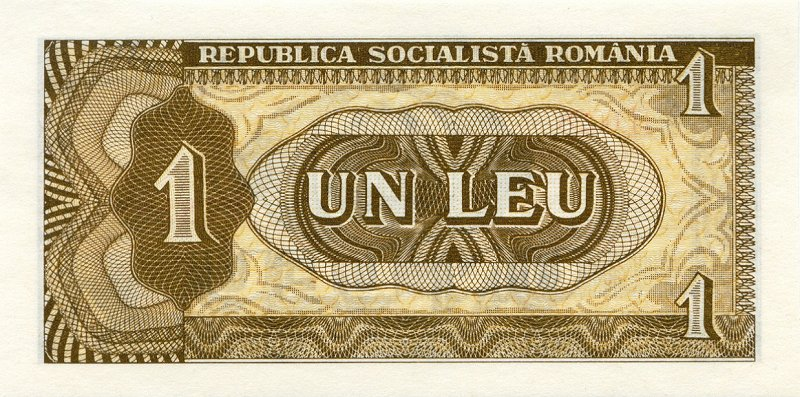
Reverse

1966 1 leu issue
