= Solar eclipse of June 24, 1778 =

Total eclipse

- Total eclipse
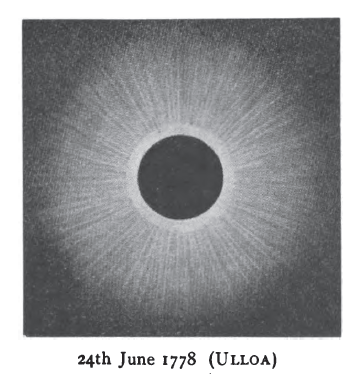
- Engraving of the totality of the eclipse, after a drawing by Antonio de Ulloa

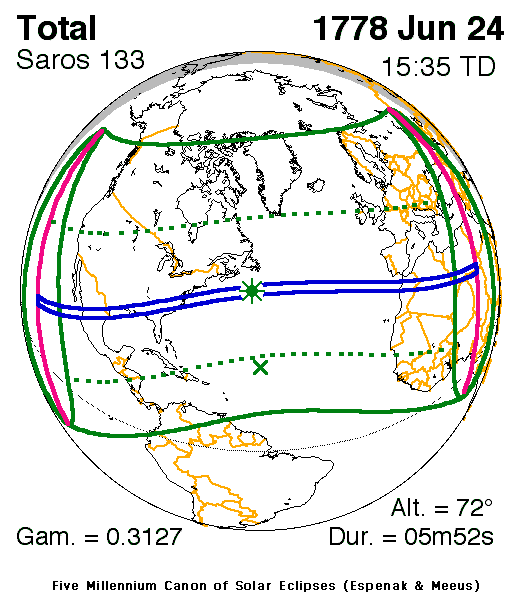
- Map
- Gamma: 0.3127
- Magnitude: 1.0746

Maximum eclipse
- Duration: 352 s (5 min 52 s)
- Coordinates: 41.8°N 55°W
- Max. width of band: 255 km (158 mi)

Times (UTC)
- Greatest eclipse: 15:34:56

References
- Saros: 133 (32 of 72)
- Catalog # (SE5000): 8985

A total solar eclipse occurred on June 24, 1778. A solar eclipse occurs when the Moon passes between Earth and the Sun, thereby totally or partly obscuring the image of the Sun for a viewer on Earth. A total solar eclipse occurs when the Moon's apparent diameter is larger than the Sun's, blocking all direct sunlight, turning day into darkness. Totality occurs in a narrow path across Earth's surface, with the partial solar eclipse visible over a surrounding region thousands of kilometres wide.

The total eclipse was visible in a path across New Spain (some in present-day Mexico) and the southeastern United States and ended across northern Africa.

== Observations ==
The first total solar eclipse recorded in the United States, it went over Lower California to New England.

Thomas Jefferson wrote on the eclipse, but was unable to see it clearly from Virginia due to cloudy weather. He sent his notes to fellow astronomical observer and the President of the College of William & Mary, Reverend James Madison, who shared that conditions had been somewhat better in Williamsburg:

"I was very glad to see your Observations, tho they differ considerably from those we made here. The same Misfortune of a cloudy Morning prevented us from seeing the beginning—but we had a very good View of the End which Mr. Page made at 11h 3' 25"—and myself at 11h 3' 27"—though I think the Altitude of the Sun was such as must render the Observations uncertain to a few Seconds. The End of total Darkness was at 45' 30"—This was pretty nearly determined, for the Return of Light was almost instantaneous. There was really something awful in the Appearance which all Nature assumed. You could not determine your most intimate Acquaintance at 20 yds distance. Lightning Buggs were seen at Night. I began on the 17th to make corresponding Observations & had the Time very accurate. Rittenhouse got to Phila Time eno' to make an Observation, but he likewise saw only the End, and informs that it was at 11. 14' 40" [?] M. [?] Time. The Effect of the Parallax will doubtless make a considerable difference."

General George Rogers Clark and his men observed the eclipse as they passed over the Falls of the Ohio on their way to take Kaskaskia during the Illinois Campaign, regarding it as a good omen. U.S. troops marching south through Georgia in an abortive attempt to invade British East Florida also subsequently recorded the event. This solar eclipse lasted four minutes over the middle Atlantic and New England States.

== Related eclipses ==
=== Saros 133 ===
This eclipse is a part of Saros series 133, repeating every 18 years, 11 days, and containing 72 events. The series started with a partial solar eclipse on July 13, 1219. It contains annular eclipses from November 20, 1435 through January 13, 1526; a hybrid eclipse on January 24, 1544; and total eclipses from February 3, 1562 through June 21, 2373. The series ends at member 72 as a partial eclipse on September 5, 2499. Its eclipses are tabulated in three columns; every third eclipse in the same column is one exeligmos apart, so they all cast shadows over approximately the same parts of the Earth.

The longest duration of annularity was produced by member 25 at 1 minutes, 14 seconds on November 30, 1453, and the longest duration of totality was produced by member 61 at 6 minutes, 50 seconds on August 7, 1850. All eclipses in this series occur at the Moon’s ascending node of orbit.

Series members 34–55 occur between 1801 and 2200:
34	35	36
July 17, 1814	July 27, 1832	August 7, 1850
37	38	39
August 18, 1868	August 29, 1886	September 9, 1904
40	41	42
September 21, 1922	October 1, 1940	October 12, 1958
43	44	45
October 23, 1976	November 3, 1994	November 13, 2012
46	47	48
November 25, 2030	December 5, 2048	December 17, 2066
49	50	51
December 27, 2084	January 8, 2103	January 19, 2121
52	53	54
January 30, 2139	February 9, 2157	February 21, 2175
55
March 3, 2193
