= Solar eclipse of March 7, 1598 =

Total eclipse

- Total eclipse
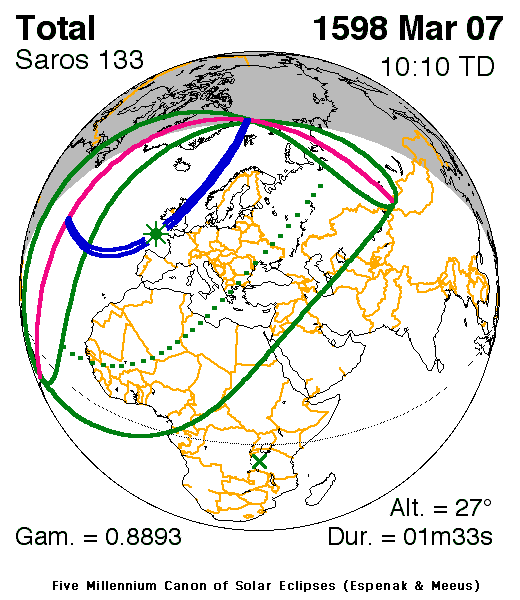
- Map
- Gamma: 0.8893
- Magnitude: 1.0214

Maximum eclipse
- Duration: 93 s (1 min 33 s)
- Coordinates: 47.7°N 8.2°W
- Max. width of band: 156 km (97 mi)

Times (UTC)
- Greatest eclipse: 10:10:01

References
- Saros: 133 (22 of 72)
- Catalog # (SE5000): 8536

A total solar eclipse occurred on March 7, 1598 (25 February 1597 using the Old Style date). A solar eclipse occurs when the Moon passes between Earth and the Sun, thereby totally or partly obscuring the image of the Sun for a viewer on Earth. A total solar eclipse occurs when the Moon's apparent diameter is larger than the Sun's, blocking all direct sunlight, turning day into darkness. Totality occurs in a narrow path across Earth's surface, with the partial solar eclipse visible over a surrounding region thousands of kilometres wide.

== Visibility ==
Totality was visible from the British Isles with a diagonal track from Cornwall in the south-west to Aberdeen in the north-east of Scotland.

It was observed from Germany by Tycho Brahe, as described in his letters to Kepler and Magini. Brahe's students in Rostock, Jutland, and at Brahe's Uraniborg observatory on Hven also observed and recorded the eclipse.

In a correspondence published in an 1869 Royal Astronomical Society Astronomical Register issue, Alex Brown said that the 1598 eclipse was well-observed and remembered in Scotland. The event was dubbed Black Saturday, and the next cycle of the eclipse is known as Mirk Monday.

== Related eclipses ==
It is a part of solar Saros 133. This is the 22nd member of Solar Saros 133. The previous event was on February 15, 1580 (21st member). The next event would be on March 17, 1616 (23rd member).

== See also ==
- List of solar eclipses visible from the United Kingdom
