= Solar eclipse of March 18, 1988 =

Total eclipse

- Total eclipse
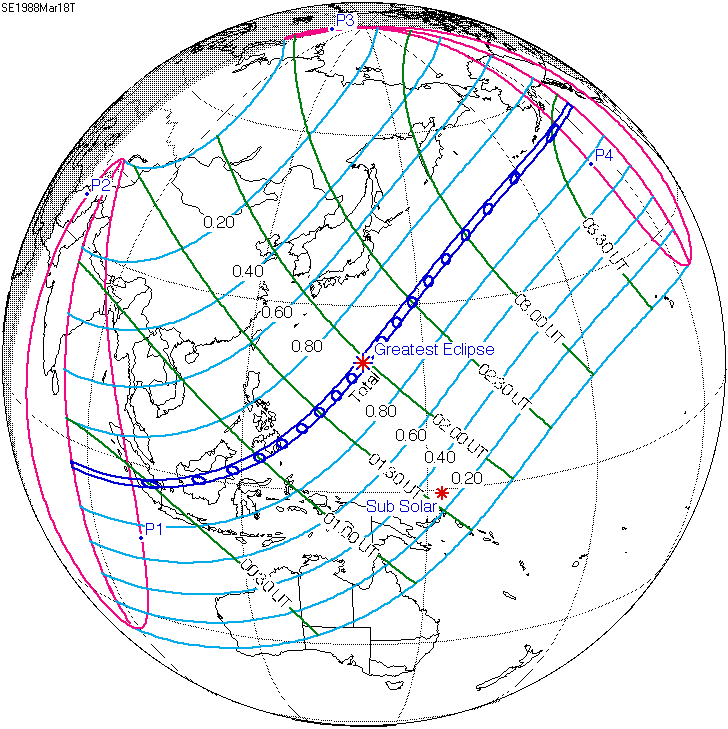
- Map
- Gamma: 0.4188
- Magnitude: 1.0464

Maximum eclipse
- Duration: 226 s (3 min 46 s)
- Coordinates: 20.7°N 140°E
- Max. width of band: 169 km (105 mi)

Times (UTC)
- Greatest eclipse: 1:58:56

References
- Saros: 139 (28 of 71)
- Catalog # (SE5000): 9482

A total solar eclipse occurred at the Moon's ascending node of orbit between Thursday, March 17 and Friday, March 18, 1988, with a magnitude of 1.0464. A solar eclipse occurs when the Moon passes between Earth and the Sun, thereby totally or partly obscuring the image of the Sun for a viewer on Earth. A total solar eclipse occurs when the Moon's apparent diameter is larger than the Sun's, blocking all direct sunlight, turning day into darkness. Totality occurs in a narrow path across Earth's surface, with the partial solar eclipse visible over a surrounding region thousands of kilometres wide. Occurring only 1.1 days after perigee (on March 16, 1988, at 20:30 UTC), the Moon's apparent diameter was larger.

Totality was visible in Indonesia and southern Philippines. A partial eclipse was visible for parts of South Asia, Southeast Asia, East Asia, Northeast Asia, Australia, and Alaska.

== Observation ==
The tourism office of the General Santos City government in the Philippines promoted it as a big tourism event. Hordes of scientists, astronomers, journalists, TV crews and tourists from all over the globe observed the totality from there. Then President of the Philippines Corazon Aquino also joined in to experience the event.

== Eclipse timing ==
=== Places experiencing total eclipse ===
Solar Eclipse of March 18, 1988 (Local Times)
Country or territory	City or place	Start of partial eclipse	Start of total eclipse	Maximum eclipse	End of total eclipse	End of partial eclipse	Duration of totality (min:s)	Duration of eclipse (hr:min)	Maximum magnitude
Indonesia	Bengkulu	06:28:06	07:27:48	07:28:13	07:28:38	08:35:13	0:50	2:07	1.0016
Indonesia	Palembang	06:29:06	07:29:25	07:30:29	07:31:33	08:39:01	2:08	2:10	1.0114
Indonesia	Pangkalpinang	06:30:09	07:31:15	07:32:19	07:33:24	08:41:47	2:09	2:12	1.0107
Indonesia	Ketapang	06:31:29	07:34:36	07:35:33	07:36:30	08:47:12	1:54	2:16	1.0067
Philippines	General Santos	07:51:25	09:03:26	09:05:06	09:06:45	10:26:06	3:19	2:35	1.0201
Philippines	Davao City	07:53:23	09:06:05	09:07:29	09:08:53	10:28:48	2:48	2:35	1.0103

=== Places experiencing partial eclipse ===
Solar Eclipse of March 18, 1988 (Local Times)
Country or territory	City or place	Start of partial eclipse	Maximum eclipse	End of partial eclipse	Duration of eclipse (hr:min)	Maximum coverage
Cocos (Keeling) Islands	Bantam	06:06:20 (sunrise)	06:49:31	07:50:15	1:44	71.81%
Christmas Island	Flying Fish Cove	06:24:52	07:23:59	08:29:27	2:05	74.15%
Indonesia	Jakarta	06:27:04	07:28:30	08:36:58	2:10	89.36%
Singapore	Singapore	07:33:27	08:34:48	09:43:19	2:10	88.59%
Malaysia	Kuala Lumpur	07:35:32	08:35:42	09:42:47	2:07	80.62%
Timor-Leste	Dili	07:36:54	08:42:29	09:54:22	2:17	56.51%
India	Chennai	06:14:29 (sunrise)	06:16:42	07:02:26	0:48	42.73%
Sri Lanka	Sri Jayawardenepura Kotte	06:15:33 (sunrise)	06:17:44	06:58:31	0:43	52.04%
Thailand	Bangkok	06:53:12	07:49:39	08:51:57	1:59	47.93%
Brunei	Bandar Seri Begawan	07:42:10	08:49:50	10:05:19	2:23	89.35%
Cambodia	Phnom Penh	06:49:53	07:50:01	08:56:46	2:07	57.37%
Vietnam	Ho Chi Minh City	06:48:52	07:50:27	08:58:52	2:10	61.34%
Myanmar	Yangon	06:29:07	07:21:18	08:18:28	1:49	37.62%
Vietnam	Hanoi	07:10:57	08:07:02	09:08:18	1:57	35.45%
Philippines	Manila	08:03:39	09:14:47	10:32:41	2:29	72.34%
Hong Kong	Hong Kong	08:17:16	09:19:46	10:27:43	2:10	42.93%
Palau	Ngerulmud	09:04:35	10:22:12	11:45:18	2:41	85.04%
Federated States of Micronesia	Colonia	10:13:06	11:32:01	12:55:22	2:42	80.89%
Taiwan	Taipei	08:28:06	09:35:55	10:48:35	2:20	49.70%
China	Shanghai	08:43:37	09:47:36	10:55:15	2:12	38.48%
Guam	Hagåtña	10:31:26	11:51:33	13:13:52	2:42	71.86%
Northern Mariana Islands	Saipan	10:36:16	11:56:52	13:19:09	2:43	73.35%
South Korea	Seoul	10:02:32	11:07:04	12:13:50	2:11	38.02%
Japan	Tokyo	10:08:08	11:23:34	12:39:37	2:31	67.97%
Russia	Petropavlovsk-Kamchatsky	13:54:53	15:02:09	16:07:26	2:13	61.43%
Canada	Whitehorse (Note: The times listed for this location occur on March 17, 1988, local time.)	18:31:03	19:04:20	19:08:43 (sunset)	0:38	47.45%
Russia	Anadyr	14:14:38	15:12:29	16:08:36	1:54	48.91%
Canada	Dawson City	18:28:30	19:21:11	19:26:05 (sunset)	0:58	66.47%
United States	Anchorage	17:27:55	18:25:36	19:08:07 (sunset)	1:40	75.51%
United States	Unalaska	17:23:09	18:26:59	19:27:15	2:04	95.58%

== Eclipse details ==
Shown below are two tables displaying details about this particular solar eclipse. The first table outlines times at which the Moon's penumbra or umbra attains the specific parameter, and the second table describes various other parameters pertaining to this eclipse.

March 18, 1988 Solar Eclipse Times
Event	Time (UTC)
First Penumbral External Contact	1988 March 17 at 23:24:58.4 UTC
First Umbral External Contact	1988 March 18 at 00:23:32.6 UTC
First Central Line	1988 March 18 at 00:24:27.6 UTC
First Umbral Internal Contact	1988 March 18 at 00:25:22.6 UTC
First Penumbral Internal Contact	1988 March 18 at 01:38:59.5 UTC
Greatest Duration	1988 March 18 at 01:57:26.1 UTC
Greatest Eclipse	1988 March 18 at 01:58:56.4 UTC
Ecliptic Conjunction	1988 March 18 at 02:03:15.6 UTC
Equatorial Conjunction	1988 March 18 at 02:23:10.7 UTC
Last Penumbral Internal Contact	1988 March 18 at 02:18:20.1 UTC
Last Umbral Internal Contact	1988 March 18 at 03:32:16.8 UTC
Last Central Line	1988 March 18 at 03:33:10.6 UTC
Last Umbral External Contact	1988 March 18 at 03:34:04.3 UTC
Last Penumbral External Contact	1988 March 18 at 04:32:47.6 UTC

March 18, 1988 Solar Eclipse Parameters
Parameter	Value
Eclipse Magnitude	1.04640
Eclipse Obscuration	1.09496
Gamma	0.41879
Sun Right Ascension	23h51m32.0s
Sun Declination	-00°55'03.0"
Sun Semi-Diameter	16'04.1"
Sun Equatorial Horizontal Parallax	08.8"
Moon Right Ascension	23h50m42.6s
Moon Declination	-00°32'52.0"
Moon Semi-Diameter	16'33.4"
Moon Equatorial Horizontal Parallax	1°00'45.8"
ΔT	55.9 s

== Eclipse season ==
This eclipse is part of an eclipse season, a period, roughly every six months, when eclipses occur. Only two (or occasionally three) eclipse seasons occur each year, and each season lasts about 35 days and repeats just short of six months (173 days) later; thus two full eclipse seasons always occur each year. Either two or three eclipses happen each eclipse season. In the sequence below, each eclipse is separated by a fortnight.

Eclipse season of March 1988
March 3 Descending node (full moon)	March 18 Ascending node (new moon)
Penumbral lunar eclipse Lunar Saros 113	Total solar eclipse Solar Saros 139

== Related eclipses ==
=== Eclipses in 1988 ===
- A penumbral lunar eclipse on March 3.
- A total solar eclipse on March 18.
- A partial lunar eclipse on August 27.
- An annular solar eclipse on September 11.

=== Metonic ===
- Preceded by: Solar eclipse of May 30, 1984
- Followed by: Solar eclipse of January 4, 1992

=== Tzolkinex ===
- Preceded by: Solar eclipse of February 4, 1981
- Followed by: Solar eclipse of April 29, 1995

=== Half-Saros ===
- Preceded by: Lunar eclipse of March 13, 1979
- Followed by: Lunar eclipse of March 24, 1997

=== Tritos ===
- Preceded by: Solar eclipse of April 18, 1977
- Followed by: Solar eclipse of February 16, 1999

=== Solar Saros 139 ===
- Preceded by: Solar eclipse of March 7, 1970
- Followed by: Solar eclipse of March 29, 2006

=== Inex ===
- Preceded by: Solar eclipse of April 8, 1959
- Followed by: Solar eclipse of February 26, 2017

=== Triad ===
- Preceded by: Solar eclipse of May 18, 1901
- Followed by: Solar eclipse of January 16, 2075

=== Solar eclipses of 1986–1989 ===
This eclipse is a member of a semester series. An eclipse in a semester series of solar eclipses repeats approximately every 177 days and 4 hours (a semester) at alternating nodes of the Moon's orbit.

Solar eclipse series sets from 1986 to 1989
Ascending node			Descending node		
Saros	Map	Gamma	Saros	Map	Gamma
119	April 9, 1986 Partial	−1.0822	124	October 3, 1986 Hybrid	0.9931
129	March 29, 1987 Hybrid	−0.3053	134	September 23, 1987 Annular	0.2787
139	March 18, 1988 Total	0.4188	144	September 11, 1988 Annular	−0.4681
149	March 7, 1989 Partial	1.0981	154	August 31, 1989 Partial	−1.1928

=== Saros 139 ===
This eclipse is a part of Saros series 139, repeating every 18 years, 11 days, and containing 71 events. The series started with a partial solar eclipse on May 17, 1501. It contains hybrid eclipses from August 11, 1627 through December 9, 1825 and total eclipses from December 21, 1843 through March 26, 2601. There are no annular eclipses in this set. The series ends at member 71 as a partial eclipse on July 3, 2763. Its eclipses are tabulated in three columns; every third eclipse in the same column is one exeligmos apart, so they all cast shadows over approximately the same parts of the Earth.

The longest duration of totality will be produced by member 61 at 7 minutes, 29.22 seconds on July 16, 2186. This date is the longest solar eclipse computed between 4000 BC and AD 6000. All eclipses in this series occur at the Moon’s ascending node of orbit.

Series members 18–39 occur between 1801 and 2200:
18	19	20
November 29, 1807	December 9, 1825	December 21, 1843
21	22	23
December 31, 1861	January 11, 1880	January 22, 1898
24	25	26
February 3, 1916	February 14, 1934	February 25, 1952
27	28	29
March 7, 1970	March 18, 1988	March 29, 2006
30	31	32
April 8, 2024	April 20, 2042	April 30, 2060
33	34	35
May 11, 2078	May 22, 2096	June 3, 2114
36	37	38
June 13, 2132	June 25, 2150	July 5, 2168
39
July 16, 2186

=== Metonic series ===
The metonic series repeats eclipses every 19 years (6939.69 days), lasting about 5 cycles. Eclipses occur in nearly the same calendar date. In addition, the octon subseries repeats 1/5 of that or every 3.8 years (1387.94 days). All eclipses in this table occur at the Moon's ascending node.

22 eclipse events between January 5, 1935 and August 11, 2018
January 4–5	October 23–24	August 10–12	May 30–31	March 18–19
111	113	115	117	119
January 5, 1935		August 12, 1942	May 30, 1946	March 18, 1950
121	123	125	127	129
January 5, 1954	October 23, 1957	August 11, 1961	May 30, 1965	March 18, 1969
131	133	135	137	139
January 4, 1973	October 23, 1976	August 10, 1980	May 30, 1984	March 18, 1988
141	143	145	147	149
January 4, 1992	October 24, 1995	August 11, 1999	May 31, 2003	March 19, 2007
151	153	155		
January 4, 2011	October 23, 2014	August 11, 2018		

=== Tritos series ===
This eclipse is a part of a tritos cycle, repeating at alternating nodes every 135 synodic months (≈ 3986.63 days, or 11 years minus 1 month). Their appearance and longitude are irregular due to a lack of synchronization with the anomalistic month (period of perigee), but groupings of 3 tritos cycles (≈ 33 years minus 3 months) come close (≈ 434.044 anomalistic months), so eclipses are similar in these groupings.

Series members between 1801 and 2200
August 28, 1802 (Saros 122)	July 27, 1813 (Saros 123)	June 26, 1824 (Saros 124)	May 27, 1835 (Saros 125)	April 25, 1846 (Saros 126)
March 25, 1857 (Saros 127)	February 23, 1868 (Saros 128)	January 22, 1879 (Saros 129)	December 22, 1889 (Saros 130)	November 22, 1900 (Saros 131)
October 22, 1911 (Saros 132)	September 21, 1922 (Saros 133)	August 21, 1933 (Saros 134)	July 20, 1944 (Saros 135)	June 20, 1955 (Saros 136)
May 20, 1966 (Saros 137)	April 18, 1977 (Saros 138)	March 18, 1988 (Saros 139)	February 16, 1999 (Saros 140)	January 15, 2010 (Saros 141)
December 14, 2020 (Saros 142)	November 14, 2031 (Saros 143)	October 14, 2042 (Saros 144)	September 12, 2053 (Saros 145)	August 12, 2064 (Saros 146)
July 13, 2075 (Saros 147)	June 11, 2086 (Saros 148)	May 11, 2097 (Saros 149)	April 11, 2108 (Saros 150)	March 11, 2119 (Saros 151)
February 8, 2130 (Saros 152)	January 8, 2141 (Saros 153)	December 8, 2151 (Saros 154)	November 7, 2162 (Saros 155)	October 7, 2173 (Saros 156)
September 4, 2184 (Saros 157)	August 5, 2195 (Saros 158)			

=== Inex series ===
This eclipse is a part of the long period inex cycle, repeating at alternating nodes, every 358 synodic months (≈ 10,571.95 days, or 29 years minus 20 days). Their appearance and longitude are irregular due to a lack of synchronization with the anomalistic month (period of perigee). However, groupings of 3 inex cycles (≈ 87 years minus 2 months) comes close (≈ 1,151.02 anomalistic months), so eclipses are similar in these groupings.

Series members between 1801 and 2200
July 17, 1814 (Saros 133)	June 27, 1843 (Saros 134)	June 6, 1872 (Saros 135)
May 18, 1901 (Saros 136)	April 28, 1930 (Saros 137)	April 8, 1959 (Saros 138)
March 18, 1988 (Saros 139)	February 26, 2017 (Saros 140)	February 5, 2046 (Saros 141)
January 16, 2075 (Saros 142)	December 29, 2103 (Saros 143)	December 7, 2132 (Saros 144)
November 17, 2161 (Saros 145)	October 29, 2190 (Saros 146)	
