= Solar Saros 133 =

Saros cycle series 133 for solar eclipses

Historic saros cycle animation

Saros cycle series 133 for solar eclipses occurs at the Moon's ascending node, repeating every 18 years, 11 days, containing 72 eclipses, 53 of which are umbral (6 annular, 1 hybrid, 46 total). The first eclipse in the series was on 13 July 1219 and the last will be on 5 September 2499. The most recent eclipse was a total eclipse on 13 November 2012 and the next will be a total eclipse on 25 November 2030.

The longest duration of totality was 6 minutes, 49.97 seconds on August 7, 1850 and the longest annular was 1 minute 14 seconds on 30 November 1453. This solar saros is linked to Lunar Saros 126.

June 24, 1778; Series member 32	August 18, 1868; Series member 37	August 29, 1886; Series member 38	November 13, 2012; Series member 45

== Umbral eclipses ==
Umbral eclipses (annular, total and hybrid) can be further classified as either: 1) Central (two limits), 2) Central (one limit) or 3) Non-Central (one limit). The statistical distribution of these classes in Saros series 133 appears in the following table.

Classification	Number	Percent
All Umbral eclipses	53	100.00%
Central (two limits)	51	96.23%
Central (one limit)	1	1.89%
Non-central (one limit)	1	1.89%

== All eclipses ==
In the following list, the Julian calendar is used for the first 21 members of the series; the Gregorian calendar is used for all the rest, starting with the solar eclipse of March 7, 1598.

Saros	Member	Date	Time (Greatest) UTC	Type	Location Lat, Long	Gamma	Mag.	Width (km)	Duration (min:sec)	Ref
133	1	July 13, 1219	8:23:41	Partial	68.4°N 137.2°W	1.5337	0.0308			
133	2	July 23, 1237	15:20:43	Partial	69.4N 106.7E	1.4562	0.1681			
133	3	August 3, 1255	22:23:39	Partial	70.2N 11.5W	1.3823	0.2996			
133	4	August 14, 1273	5:35:26	Partial	71N 132.5W	1.3146	0.4205			
133	5	August 25, 1291	12:55:31	Partial	71.6N 103.8E	1.2525	0.5314			
133	6	September 4, 1309	20:25:26	Partial	72N 22.7W	1.1974	0.63			
133	7	September 16, 1327	4:04:29	Partial	72.1N 151.8W	1.1489	0.7168			
133	8	September 26, 1345	11:53:53	Partial	72N 76.5E	1.1079	0.7902			
133	9	October 7, 1363	19:52:55	Partial	71.6N 57.4W	1.0741	0.8507			
133	10	October 18, 1381	4:00:20	Partial	71N 167.1E	1.0464	0.9004			
133	11	October 29, 1399	12:17:08	Partial	70.2N 29.8E	1.0256	0.938			
133	12	November 8, 1417	20:41:02	Partial	69.2N 108.6W	1.0097	0.967			
133	13	November 20, 1435	5:12:02	Annular	68.2N 111.8E	0.9991	0.9868	-	-	
133	14	November 30, 1453	13:46:17	Annular	60.4N 27.7W	0.9903	0.9842	469	1m 14s	
133	15	December 11, 1471	22:25:20	Annular	57.1N 165W	0.9849	0.9871	287	1m 2s	
133	16	December 22, 1489	7:04:57	Annular	54.6N 58.8E	0.9791	0.9904	175	0m 47s	
133	17	January 2, 1508	15:45:09	Annular	52.8N 77W	0.9732	0.9941	92	0m 28s	
133	18	January 13, 1526	0:22:31	Annular	51N 148.8E	0.9644	0.9985	19	0m 7s	
133	19	January 24, 1544	8:57:45	Hybrid	49.7N 16E	0.9533	1.0035	40	0m 16s	
133	20	February 3, 1562	17:27:33	Total	48.6N 114.5W	0.9373	1.0091	89	0m 41s	
133	21	February 15, 1580	1:52:13	Total	47.9N 117.3E	0.9164	1.0151	127	1m 7s	
133	22	March 7, 1598	10:10:01	Total	47.7N 8.2W	0.8893	1.0214	156	1m 33s	
133	23	March 17, 1616	18:21:45	Total	48N 131.4W	0.8568	1.0279	180	1m 58s	
133	24	March 29, 1634	2:25:11	Total	48.7N 108.6E	0.8169	1.0346	198	2m 24s	
133	25	April 8, 1652	10:22:28	Total	49.6N 8.9W	0.7713	1.0412	213	2m 49s	
133	26	April 19, 1670	18:12:20	Total	50.6N 123.3W	0.7191	1.0476	225	3m 15s	
133	27	April 30, 1688	1:57:34	Total	51.4N 124.4E	0.6621	1.0535	234	3m 40s	
133	28	May 12, 1706	9:35:09	Total	51.5N 15.2E	0.5984	1.0591	242	4m 6s	
133	29	May 22, 1724	17:10:09	Total	50.8N 92.9W	0.5318	1.064	247	4m 33s	
133	30	June 3, 1742	0:39:57	Total	49N 160.2E	0.4607	1.0683	251	5m 0s	
133	31	June 13, 1760	8:09:15	Total	46N 52.7E	0.3883	1.0719	254	5m 27s	
133	32	June 24, 1778	15:34:56	Total	41.8N 55W	0.3127	1.0746	255	5m 52s	
133	33	July 4, 1796	23:02:54	Total	36.8N 164.6W	0.2385	1.0764	255	6m 15s	
133	34	July 17, 1814	6:30:29	Total	30.9N 84.7E	0.1641	1.0774	254	6m 33s	
133	35	July 27, 1832	14:01:06	Total	24.5N 27.9W	0.0919	1.0776	252	6m 46s	
133	36	August 7, 1850	21:33:54	Total	17.7N 141.8W	0.0215	1.0769	249	6m 50s	
133	37	August 18, 1868	5:12:10	Total	10.6N 102.2E	-0.0443	1.0756	245	6m 47s	
133	38	August 29, 1886	12:55:23	Total	3.5N 15.3W	-0.1059	1.0735	240	6m 36s	
133	39	September 9, 1904	20:44:21	Total	3.7S 134.5W	-0.1625	1.0709	234	6m 20s	
133	40	September 21, 1922	4:40:31	Total	10.7S 104.5E	-0.213	1.0678	226	5m 59s	
133	41	October 1, 1940	12:44:06	Total	17.5S 18.2W	-0.2573	1.0645	218	5m 35s	
133	42	October 12, 1958	20:55:28	Total	24S 142.4W	-0.2951	1.0608	209	5m 11s	
133	43	October 23, 1976	5:13:45	Total	30S 92.3E	-0.327	1.0572	199	4m 46s	
133	44	November 3, 1994	13:40:06	Total	35.4S 34.2W	-0.3522	1.0535	189	4m 23s	
133	45	November 13, 2012	22:12:55	Total	40S 161.3W	-0.3719	1.05	179	4m 2s	
133	46	November 25, 2030	6:51:37	Total	43.6S 71.2E	-0.3867	1.0468	169	3m 44s	
133	47	December 5, 2048	15:35:27	Total	46.1S 56.4W	-0.3973	1.044	160	3m 28s	
133	48	December 17, 2066	0:23:40	Total	47.4S 175.8E	-0.4043	1.0416	152	3m 14s	
133	49	December 27, 2084	9:13:48	Total	47.3S 47.7E	-0.4094	1.0396	146	3m 4s	
133	50	January 8, 2103	18:04:21	Total	46.1S 80.8W	-0.414	1.0381	140	2m 57s	
133	51	January 19, 2121	2:54:15	Total	43.9S 150.1E	-0.419	1.0371	137	2m 52s	
133	52	January 30, 2139	11:42:25	Total	41S 20.7E	-0.4255	1.0364	135	2m 49s	
133	53	February 9, 2157	20:25:36	Total	37.7S 108.4W	-0.4358	1.0362	135	2m 49s	
133	54	February 21, 2175	5:04:24	Total	34.2S 122.9E	-0.4495	1.0362	135	2m 50s	
133	55	March 3, 2193	13:36:08	Total	30.9S 4.4W	-0.4689	1.0365	137	2m 53s	
133	56	March 15, 2211	22:01:40	Total	27.8S 130.6W	-0.4931	1.0368	140	2m 57s	
133	57	March 26, 2229	6:17:35	Total	25.5S 105.5E	-0.5251	1.0371	144	3m 2s	
133	58	April 6, 2247	14:26:51	Total	23.8S 16.9W	-0.5624	1.0372	149	3m 7s	
133	59	April 16, 2265	22:26:19	Total	23.1S 136.8W	-0.6073	1.0371	154	3m 11s	
133	60	April 28, 2283	6:18:21	Total	23.6S 105E	-0.6581	1.0366	160	3m 13s	
133	61	May 9, 2301	14:00:59	Total	25.5S 11W	-0.7161	1.0354	168	3m 10s	
133	62	May 20, 2319	21:37:23	Total	29S 125.8W	-0.7786	1.0336	178	3m 2s	
133	63	May 31, 2337	5:05:56	Total	34.6S 121.2E	-0.847	1.0309	195	2m 46s	
133	64	June 11, 2355	12:28:18	Total	43.3S 9.2E	-0.9196	1.0269	233	2m 18s	
133	65	June 21, 2373	19:45:29	Total	62.7S 100.1W	-0.9954	1.0191	-	1m 24s	
133	66	July 3, 2391	2:58:53	Partial	67.1S 143E	-1.0732	0.8664			
133	67	July 13, 2409	10:09:33	Partial	68.1S 24.6E	-1.1523	0.7186			
133	68	July 24, 2427	17:18:10	Partial	69.1S 93.7W	-1.2318	0.5709			
133	69	August 4, 2445	0:27:22	Partial	70S 147.3E	-1.3097	0.4272			
133	70	August 15, 2463	7:37:35	Partial	70.8S 27.4E	-1.3853	0.2892			
133	71	August 25, 2481	14:49:25	Partial	71.4S 93.5W	-1.4585	0.1568			
133	72	September 5, 2499	22:05:19	Partial	71.9S 144.2E	-1.5273	0.034			
