= Solar eclipse of May 22, 1724 =

Total eclipse

- Total eclipse
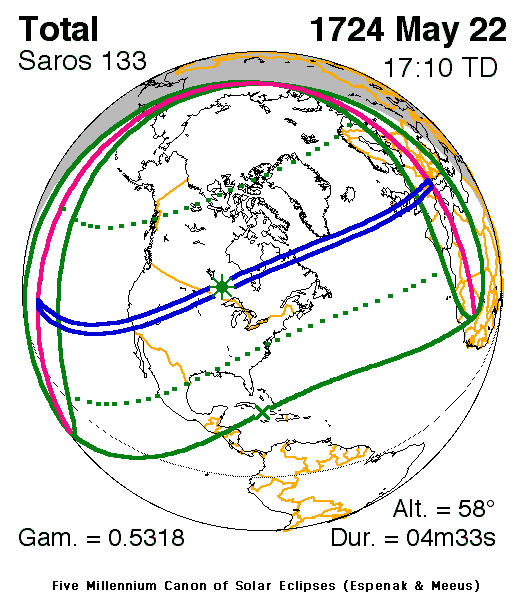
- Map
- Gamma: 0.5318
- Magnitude: 1.064

Maximum eclipse
- Duration: 273 s (4 min 33 s)
- Coordinates: 50.8°N 92.9°W
- Max. width of band: 247 km (153 mi)

Times (UTC)
- Greatest eclipse: 17:10:09

References
- Saros: 133 (29 of 72)
- Catalog # (SE5000): 8847

A total solar eclipse occurred on May 22, 1724. A solar eclipse occurs when the Moon passes between Earth and the Sun, thereby totally or partly obscuring the image of the Sun for a viewer on Earth. A total solar eclipse occurs when the Moon's apparent diameter is larger than the Sun's, blocking all direct sunlight, turning day into darkness. Totality occurs in a narrow path across Earth's surface, with the partial solar eclipse visible over a surrounding region thousands of kilometres wide.

== Observations ==
External image
- https://www.galerie-roger-viollet.fr/en/photo-the-total-eclipse-of-the-sun-of-may-22-1724-in-641921-3048040694

This solar eclipse crossed Ireland and Great Britain near sunset, north-west to south-east track, from Galway to southern Wales and Devon in the west, eastwards to Hampshire and Sussex, but passing to the south of London. It was to be 203 years before a total solar eclipse was next witnessed from the British mainland, which had previously seen a total eclipse just nine years before, and Ireland will not see a total solar eclipse until 2090.

Thomas Simpson of Lincolnshire, then aged 13, became interested in astrology after seeing the eclipse; he later became a notable mathematician.

It crossed what would later become the city Los Angeles, CA in the morning, which constituted the village of Yaanga at the time. The next total eclipse over Los Angeles will not occur until October 15, 2498.

== Related eclipses ==
It is a part of solar Saros 133.

== See also ==
- List of solar eclipses visible from the British Isles
