= List of solar eclipses visible from the British Isles =

A solar eclipse occurs when the Moon passes between Earth and the Sun, thereby totally or partially obscuring Earth's view of the Sun. Below is a complete list of total and annular eclipses visible anywhere within the modern extent of the United Kingdom between AD 1 and AD 2200 and a description of forthcoming partial solar eclipses visible in Britain in the next fifteen years or so. For a complete list of solar eclipses visible from the United Kingdom between AD 1501 and AD 2500, see the Journal of the British Astronomical Association, February 2001.

== 1st–4th centuries (1–400) ==
- 21 June 19
  - The first total eclipse of the millennium visible in Britain. Totality was limited to the extreme south of the island, with the centre line passing over the English Channel and northern France. Nevertheless this was a long eclipse, with the longest British duration being almost 4 minutes at Lizard Point.
- 3 September 118
  - The second total eclipse was also limited to far southern Britain, but with the track shifted further north and narrower, with a shorter duration. The centre line passed near the city of Exeter (then Isca Dumnoniorum) and followed the south coast to Selsey Bill where the maximum duration of 1 minute, 56 seconds occurred.
- 6 February 129
  - A brief total eclipse shortly before sunset, with a track crossing Wales, the northwest Midlands, Cheshire, the Peak District and Yorkshire. Totality was visible in the Roman cities of Deva Victrix (Chester), Viroconium Cornoviorum (Wroxeter), and Eboracum (York), though under a minute long in each. The longest eclipse was 1 minute 23 seconds on the coast of Wales near Aberdyfi.
- 13 July 158
  - A short total eclipse, which took a diagonal track from Devon and Cornwall to Norfolk. This was the first total eclipse of the millennium visible at Londinium (London), although the city was near the southern limit of totality, seeing only about 30 seconds. The greatest duration was just over a minute near Great Yarmouth.
- 11 March 183
  - The first total eclipse of the millennium visible from present-day Scotland, also visible across northern parts of Ireland and the extreme northeast of present-day England. The centre line passed slightly south of Glasgow and Edinburgh, with totality visible along the entire length of the Antonine Wall. The maximum duration in Britain was 2 minutes 18 seconds on the Kintyre peninsula, rising to 2 minutes 21 seconds on the northwest coast of Ireland.
- 23 March 228
  - A superb total eclipse early in the morning with an unusually broad track which made it visible across a remarkably large part of Britain. Almost all of the then Roman province of Britannia saw a total eclipse; totality was visible everywhere south of a line from present-day Workington, Cumbria to Sunderland, with the southern limit of totality just south of Cornwall. The centre line entered Britain on the Welsh coast near (present-day) Cardigan and passed Coventry and Peterborough before ending on the Norfolk coast, where totality was just under 3 minutes.
- 15 June 261
  - A long annular eclipse for the Scottish Highlands and Islands, as well as much of northern and western Ireland. The southern limit of annularity followed the Highland Boundary Fault almost perfectly, with the centre line crossing Skye, Orkney and Shetland. Annularity on the centre line lasted over 4 minutes, reaching 4 minutes 10 seconds at the southern tip of Shetland.
- 27 September 303
  - A total eclipse seen in the north-eastern part of Scotland. Totality was visible from Montrose all the way to the Shetland Islands with the southern limit passing straight through Inverness. Totality on the centre line was 3 minutes with the island of Papa Westray near to the point of greatest eclipse.
- 6 May 319
  - A total eclipse for much of southern Britain. The centre line entered in the same place as that of 228, but headed south of east to end on the present-day Essex coast. A superb eclipse for London, which lay only about 16km (10mi) south of the centre line and saw 3 minutes of totality.
- 16 June 364
  - A total eclipse that just clipped the far north of Scotland, best seen on the Orkney Islands which were crossed by the centre line and saw totality last almost 4 minutes.
- 20 November 393
  - A total eclipse whose centre line took a northwest-southeast track from the Hebrides to East Anglia. Totality was seen in the Roman cities of York, Lindum Colonia (Lincoln), and Luguvalium (Carlisle), with all but the easternmost part of Hadrian's Wall under the path of totality. The maximum duration was 2 minutes 12 seconds, in present-day Suffolk.

== 5th century (401–500) ==
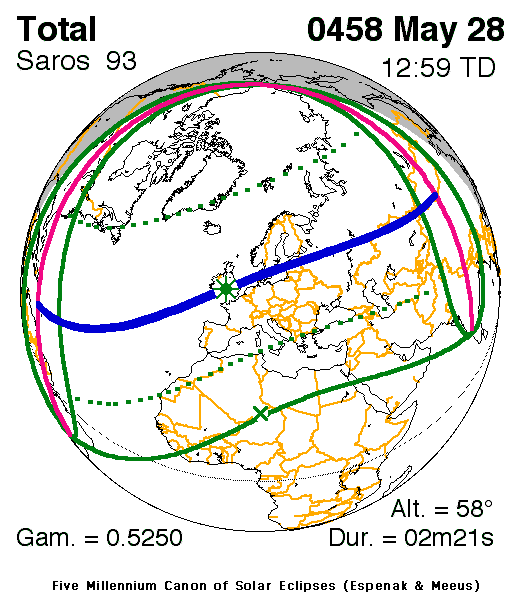

- 16 April 413
  - A total eclipse was visible in far southern Ireland, northern Wales, and the English Midlands. Totality lasted about 2 minutes.
- 28 May 458
  - A total eclipse of similar duration (2:21) followed a somewhat more oblique path, from South Wales to Lincolnshire. The point of greatest eclipse was located just east of Llandovery (then Alabum), where it occurred at about 11 in the morning.

== 6th century (501–600) ==
- 23 July 594
  - Total eclipse for much of Ireland including all of present-day Northern Ireland, southern and central Scotland, the Isle of Man and the northernmost parts of England. The centre line passed from Connemara, very close to Belfast, across Galloway to near Berwick upon Tweed. Totality lasted just over 3 minutes in the central part of the track.

== 7th century (601–700) ==
- 3 September 639
  - Totality at sunrise in most of Wales, the Midlands, and parts of northern and eastern England.
- 1 May 664
  - A total eclipse which was widely visible across the United Kingdom. It is the first eclipse for which there are recorded observations from England. Totality occurred at around 5:30 pm and lasted for over 2 minutes. (see also: Plague of 664)

== 8th–11th centuries (701–1100) ==
- 12 April 758
  - Total eclipse across southernmost parts of England from Cornwall to Kent, around 1 minutes 40 seconds at maximum. The centre line crossed from the Lizard peninsula to near Sandwich, with London just north of the path of totality.
- 1 January 865
  - Short total eclipse across the north of Ireland and Scotland, lasting only a little over 20 seconds. Total at Glasgow and Aberdeen.
- 29 October 878
  - A total eclipse across a large swathe of Britain and Ireland; the centre line entered Britain on the Wirral Peninsula and left near Ipswich. Southern limit was from just south of Aberystwyth to near Folkestone, with London about 20km (12mi) inside the path of totality; northern limit from Kintyre to the mouth of the Humber, with York just inside it by about 3km (2mi). The maximum duration was just under 2 minutes. This eclipse was recorded in the Anglo Saxon Chronicle, though erroneously entered under 879.
- 16 June 885
  - An unusually long total eclipse for the north and west of Scotland. The southern limit lay from the Isle of Jura to just north of Aberdeen, the northern limit passing just north of Shetland. On the centre line near John O'Groats, totality lasted 4 minutes and 53 seconds, and reached 5 minutes at the point of greatest eclipse in Scandinavia.
- 22 December 968
  - A total eclipse shortly after sunrise whose track just clipped the western extremity of Cornwall at Land's End, but was best seen on the Isles of Scilly, which lay closer to the centre line and saw nearly 1 minute 30 seconds of totality.
- 24 January 1023
  - A total eclipse with a SSW-NNE track centred over the Irish Sea. Totality was visible in eastern Ireland, western and northern Wales, the Isle of Man, west and north Lancashire, Cumbria, Northumberland and southern and eastern Scotland, including Edinburgh. Totality reached just over 2 1/2 minutes at maximum around the Isle of Man and Solway Firth area.

== 12th century (1101–1200) ==
- 2 August 1133
  - "King Henry's Eclipse": A total eclipse, recorded in the Peterborough Chronicle (under 1135 due to the vagaries of the dating system in use): and the next day, as he lay asleep on ship, the day darkened over all lands, and the Sun was all
- 20 March 1140
  - A total eclipse, recorded by William of Malmesbury in his Historia Novella. In his opinion this was a sign which foretold the capture of King Stephen in the Battle of Lincoln in 1141. This is the Lenten eclipse also reported in the Peterborough Chronicle as being on the thirteenth day before the kalends of April: 'After this, during Lent, the sun and the day darkened about the noon-tide of the day, when men were eating; and they lighted candles to eat by. That was the thirteenth day before the kalends of April. Men were greatly wonderstricken Totality was experienced at about 3:00 pm at the centre line of the eclipse (near Derby).

== 13th–14th centuries (1201–1400) ==
- 14 May 1230
  - A total eclipse that was notable for the fact that its track began over Britain at sunrise. Along the east coast from southeast Scotland to East Anglia, totality was observed with the sun just over 1° high, with totality peaking at 2 minutes 27 seconds on the centre line near Bridlington. At Sheffield the sun rose totally eclipsed, and over parts of northwest England, Wales and the Midlands the dawn sky would have been seen to suddenly darken just as sunrise was approaching.
- 6 October 1241
  - This total eclipse track passed down the middle of the North Sea, missing mainland Britain to the east but including most of the Shetland Islands. At the northeastern tip of Unst, totality reached 2 minutes 50 seconds.
- 16 July 1330
  - A relatively brief total eclipse that crossed Scotland from the Isle of Lewis to the Aberdeenshire and Angus coast. The maximum duration was around 52 seconds in the western parts of the track.
- 7 July 1339
  - A rare "hybrid" eclipse with an extremely narrow track and short duration. It was seen as an annular eclipse in Iceland, Greenland, North America, continental Europe and southwest Asia, but was technically an extremely brief total one lasting 1–2 seconds as the track crossed the Orkney Islands, the only location where it made landfall as a total eclipse.

== 15th–16th centuries (1401–1600) ==
- 26 June 1424
  - A total eclipse of almost 2 and a half minutes duration in the extreme north of Scotland, Orkney and Shetland.
- 17 June 1433
  - Another Scottish total eclipse from the Hebrides in the north-west to the English borders in the east and then a strip of the Yorkshire coast.
- 16 March 1485
  - Partial eclipse visible in London the same day as Richard III's queen, Anne Neville, died. Claimed as an ill omen by Richard's Tudor opponents.
- 7 March 1598 [O.S. 25 February 1597]
  - A total eclipse with a diagonal track from Cornwall in the south-west to Aberdeen in the north-east of Scotland.

== 17th–19th centuries (1601–1900) ==
3 May 1715 Cambridge, England

- 8 April 1652
  - Another total solar eclipse with a diagonal track, this time across Pembrokeshire, the Lake District and then Scotland from the south-west to the north-east, including most of the major cities.
- 12 August 1654
  - A track across the north of Scotland near Aberdeen.
- 23 September 1699
  - A narrow path of totality just clipped the north-east corner of Scotland, including Wick.
- 3 May 1715
  - A British Total Solar Eclipse from Cornwall in the south-west to Lincolnshire and Norfolk in the east. Edmund Halley predicted this eclipse to within 4 minutes accuracy, and observed it from London. The city of London experienced 3 minutes 33 seconds of totality.
- 22 May 1724
  - A Total Solar Eclipse with a north-west to south-east track, from southern Wales and Devon in the west, eastwards to Hampshire and Sussex, passing to the south of London.
- There was no Total Solar Eclipse visible from the United Kingdom between 1724 and 1925.

== 20th century (1901–2000) ==
- 24 January 1925
  - Total Solar Eclipse: A short duration total eclipse at sunset in British waters to the north of the Hebrides. Although it nowhere touched land, the path of totality ran very close to several outlying Scottish islands, including St Kilda; the islet of Sula Sgeir experienced 99.9% totality.
- 29 June 1927
  - Total Solar Eclipse: A mere 24 seconds of totality in the early morning, along a narrow track from North Wales, through Lancashire to the English north-east coast, but weather was very poor with cloud and high winds. However the Astronomer Royal's expedition to Giggleswick in North Yorkshire was amongst the few to catch sight of totality.
- 30 June 1954
  - Total Solar Eclipse at Unst in the Shetland Islands, although the centre line was north of British territorial waters. A large partial eclipse was widely observed over the whole of the UK.
- 2 October 1959
  - A partial eclipse visible over the whole of the United Kingdom ranging from approximately 20% in Northern Scotland to approximately 40% in South West Cornwall.
- 15 February 1961
  - The United Kingdom was greeted at dawn with a large portion of the Sun covered with maximum eclipse being approximately on the horizon ranging from 85% in Northern Scotland to between 92% and 95% in Southern England.

Partial solar eclipses also occurred on 20 May 1966, 22 September 1968, 25 February 1971, 10 July 1972, 30 June 1973, 11 May 1975, 29 April 1976, 20 July 1982, 15 December 1982, 4 December 1983, 30 May 1984, 21 May 1993 and 10 May 1994. (Source: HMNAO Eclipses On-line Portal.)

- 12 October 1996
  - A partial solar eclipse which covered 60% of the Sun over the British Isles.
- 11 August 1999
  - Total Solar Eclipse over Cornwall and part of south Devon, partial over the rest of the United Kingdom. Totality was observable from English Channel and the island of Alderney in the Channel Islands, but was almost universally clouded out on the British mainland. A large partial eclipse was visible in the south-east of England and south Wales. Observers in various places noted birds falling silent, daylight colours turning to grey, and temperatures falling, augmented by a passing wisp of cloud at the moment of peak eclipse.

== 21st century (2001–2100) ==
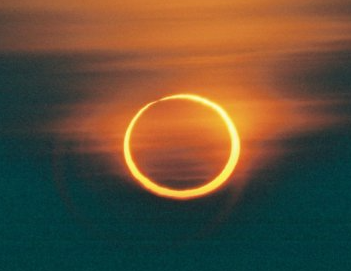
An annular eclipse from Culloden, Scotland, on 31 May 2003

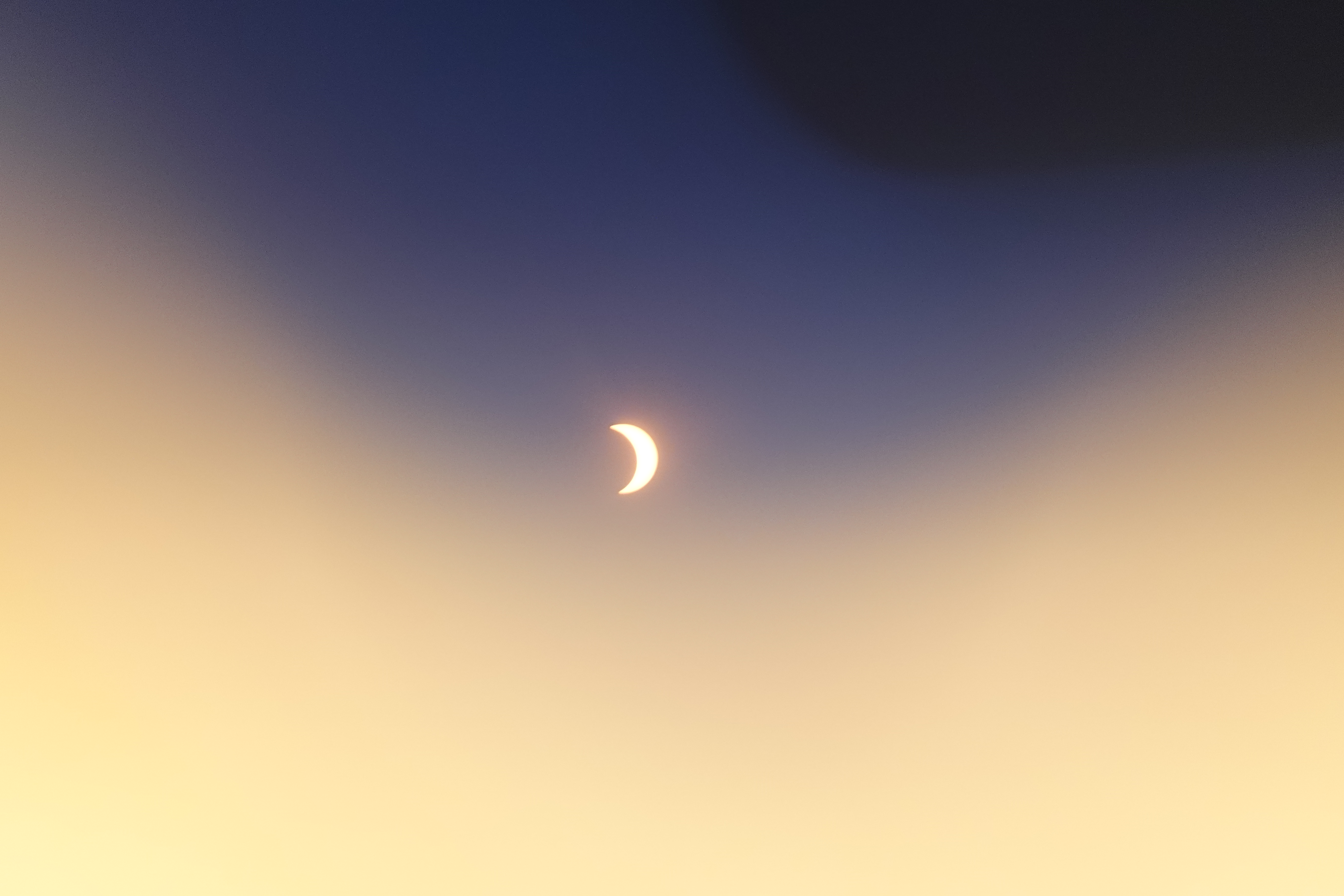
A partial solar eclipse in Essex, England, on 12 August 2026

- 31 May 2003
  - An annular solar eclipse at sunrise was visible in the far north-west of Scotland.
- 3 October 2005
  - Partial eclipse approaching 75% partial in South West England.
- 29 March 2006
  - A small partial eclipse was visible across the country. South East England saw the greatest magnitude at around 30%, northern Scotland the least at around 15%. The eclipse was total in Libya and Turkey.
- 1 August 2008
  - A small partial eclipse over the whole of the UK as a total eclipse crosses central Russia east of the Urals. 40% in northern Scotland falling to less than 20% in the south-west of England.
- 4 January 2011
  - A partial eclipse, which was nowhere total, could be seen at sunrise in South East England, where with a favourable south-eastern horizon a Sun 75% covered by the Moon was seen.
- 20 March 2015
  - An eclipse which was total across the north Atlantic including the Faroe Islands resulted in a large partial eclipse across the UK, greater than 80% everywhere. While the line of totality did not touch the mainland in the United Kingdom, it passed less than ten kilometres to the north-west of the island of Rockall.
- 21 August 2017
  - A total solar eclipse in parts of the USA results in a small partial eclipse visible at sunset.
- 11 August 2018
  - A very small partial eclipse, about 2%, on the northern coast of Scotland, Orkney and Shetland.
- 10 June 2021
  - An eclipse which was annular across Canada and the Arctic gave rise to partial eclipse across Britain ranging from 50% in northern Scotland to 30% in south-east England.
- 25 October 2022
  - An eclipse which is nowhere total results in a partial eclipse across Britain with north-east Scotland the most favoured, at around 35% falling to less than 20% in Cornwall.
- 8 April 2024
  - A total eclipse across North America which was visible as a partial eclipse from parts of Britain just before sunset.
- 29 March 2025
  - Partial ranging from 40% partial in Kent to about 50% partial in the north-west of Scotland.
- 12 August 2026
  - An eclipse which is total across Iceland, the Atlantic Ocean and Spain results in a very large partial eclipse across Britain with western Ireland the most favoured at around 96% in Cornwall, falling to 91% in Aberdeen.
- 2 August 2027
  - Partial ranging from about 30% partial in the north of Scotland to almost 60% partial in the south-west of England. Total eclipse from Gibraltar.
- 26 January 2028
  - About 40% partial at sunset.
- 1 June 2030
  - About 50% partial at sunrise.
- 21 August 2036
  - 60–70% partial, greatest in the north of Scotland.
- 16 January 2037
  - 50–60% partial at sunrise, most in the north of Scotland.
- 5 January 2038
  - Less than 20% partial nationwide at sunset.
- 2 July 2038
  - Less than 20% partial nationwide.
- 21 June 2039
  - Over 60% partial, touching 80% in the north of Scotland.
- 11 June 2048
  - Annular passing just north of Shetland. Over 60% across mainland UK.
- 14 November 2050
  - Over 80% partial across all except south and south west of England.
- 12 September 2053
  - 40–60% partial, best in south.
- 5 November 2059
  - 70–80% partial at sunrise, best in SW England.
- 3 September 2062
  - Partial grazing the north of Scotland, best in Shetland but still less than 20% partial.
- 5 February 2065
  - Partial; over 80% for whole UK. No totality.
- 21 April 2069
  - Partial eclipse, peaking at around 50% in NW Scotland.
- 12 September 2072
  - Limited partial eclipse peaking at around 40% in NE Scotland.
- 13 July 2075
  - Over 60% partial at sunrise nationally.
- 26 November 2076
  - Partial, between 40 and 60% partial
- 1 May 2079
  - Over 40% partial over 60% in NW Scotland.
- 3 September 2081
  - Totality in the Channel Islands, over 80% partial across England, Wales and Northern Ireland. Over 60% through Scotland.
- 27 February 2082
  - 60–80% partial at sunset, best in the south.
- 21 April 2088
  - Around 40–50% partial, best in the south east.
- 23 September 2090
  - Total Solar Eclipse: the next total eclipse visible in the UK follows a track similar to that of 11 August 1999, but shifted slightly further north and occurring very near sunset. Maximum duration in Cornwall will be 2 minutes and 10 seconds.
- 18 February 2091
  - Partial Solar Eclipse: viewable from most areas of the UK. It will be visible from 08:25 to 10:55 am, and at its peak at around 09:30. From southern England about 55% of the Sun will be eclipsed. From northern Scotland, over 60% will be eclipsed.
- 7 February 2092
  - 40–50% partial at sunset.
- 23 July 2093
  - Annular eclipse over southern Scotland, Northern England and most of Northern Ireland. Over 80% partial for the rest of the country. Near the centre line, just over 5 minutes of annularity will be observed. The centre line runs roughly from Ayr to Newcastle.

== 22nd century (2101–2200) ==
- 3 June 2133
  - Total eclipse over the far north-west of Scotland, including the Isles of Lewis, Harris, northern Skye and Shetland, partial eclipse elsewhere. Maximum duration will be 3 minutes and 36 seconds.
- 7 October 2135
  - Total eclipse over central and southern Scotland and north-east England. The centre line runs from the islands of Tiree and Mull, north of Glasgow and south of Edinburgh, through Livingston to Seahouses in Northumberland. Maximum duration will be 4 minutes and 50 seconds.
- 25 May 2142
  - Total eclipse over the Channel Islands and some coastal areas of south-east England, including Eastbourne, Bexhill-on-Sea, Hastings in East Sussex and Hythe, Folkestone, Dover in Kent. Maximum duration will be 2 minutes 42 seconds.
- 14 June 2151
  - Total eclipse over south-west Scotland, Northern Ireland, the Isle of Man, north, central and eastern England and north-east Wales. The centre line runs from the southern tip of the Kintyre peninsula in Argyll and Bute, through Lancashire, West and South Yorkshire, Lincolnshire and the Wash to the Suffolk coast. Maximum duration will be 3 minutes and 48 seconds.
- 4 June 2160
  - Total eclipse over Land's End in Cornwall and the Scilly Isles, as well as the far southwestern tip of Ireland, partial eclipse elsewhere. Maximum duration will be 2 minutes and 58 seconds.
- 8 November 2189
  - Total eclipse over Cornwall and south Devon and the Channel Islands, as well as southwest Ireland, partial eclipse elsewhere. The centre line runs from Tralee, through Truro and passing just to the south of Jersey. Maximum duration will be 4 minutes and 10 seconds.
- 14 April 2200
  - Total eclipse over Northern Ireland and northern England. The centre line runs from Enniskillen, through Armagh, Downpatrick, the Isle of Man, Morecambe Bay and North Yorkshire to the East coast between Bridlington and Hornsea. Maximum duration will be 1 minute and 23 seconds.
