= Solar eclipse of August 18, 1868 =

Total eclipse named after Rama IV of Siam

- Total eclipse
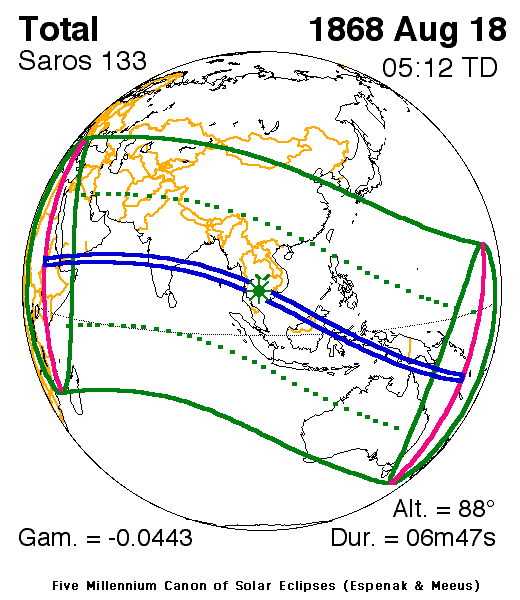
- Map
- Gamma: −0.0443
- Magnitude: 1.0756

Maximum eclipse
- Duration: 407 s (6 min 47 s)
- Coordinates: 10.6°N 102.2°E
- Max. width of band: 245 km (152 mi)

Times (UTC)
- Greatest eclipse: 5:12:10

References
- Saros: 133 (37 of 72)
- Catalog # (SE5000): 9207

A total solar eclipse occurred at the Moon's ascending node of orbit on Tuesday, August 18, 1868 (also known as "The King of Siam's eclipse"), with a magnitude of 1.0756. A solar eclipse occurs when the Moon passes between Earth and the Sun, thereby totally or partly obscuring the image of the Sun for a viewer on Earth. A total solar eclipse occurs when the Moon's apparent diameter is larger than the Sun's, blocking all direct sunlight, turning day into darkness. Totality occurs in a narrow path across Earth's surface, with the partial solar eclipse visible over a surrounding region thousands of kilometres wide. Occurring about 6.5 days after perigee (on August 17, 1868, at 22:35 UTC), the Moon's apparent diameter was larger.

The path of totality was visible from parts of modern-day Ethiopia, Eritrea, Djibouti, Yemen, India, the Andaman and Nicobar Islands, Myanmar, Thailand, Cambodia, Vietnam, Malaysia, Brunei, Indonesia, and Papua New Guinea. A partial solar eclipse was also visible for parts of East Africa, the Middle East, Central Asia, South Asia, Southeast Asia, Australia, and western Oceania.

The total solar eclipse of 18 August 1868 was accurately predicted by King Mongkut of Siam, whose calculations were acknowledged as more precise than those of contemporary French astronomers. During observations of the eclipse, Pierre Janssen in India and, independently, Norman Lockyer in England detected a new yellow spectral line in the Sun's chromosphere using spectroscopes, leading to the discovery of the chemical element helium.

== Observations ==
Observation points of the solar eclipse
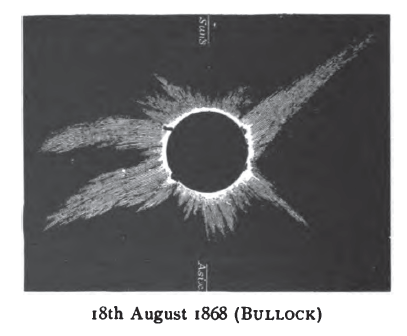
Bullock sketch of the eclipse, Total Eclipses of the Sun, 1900.

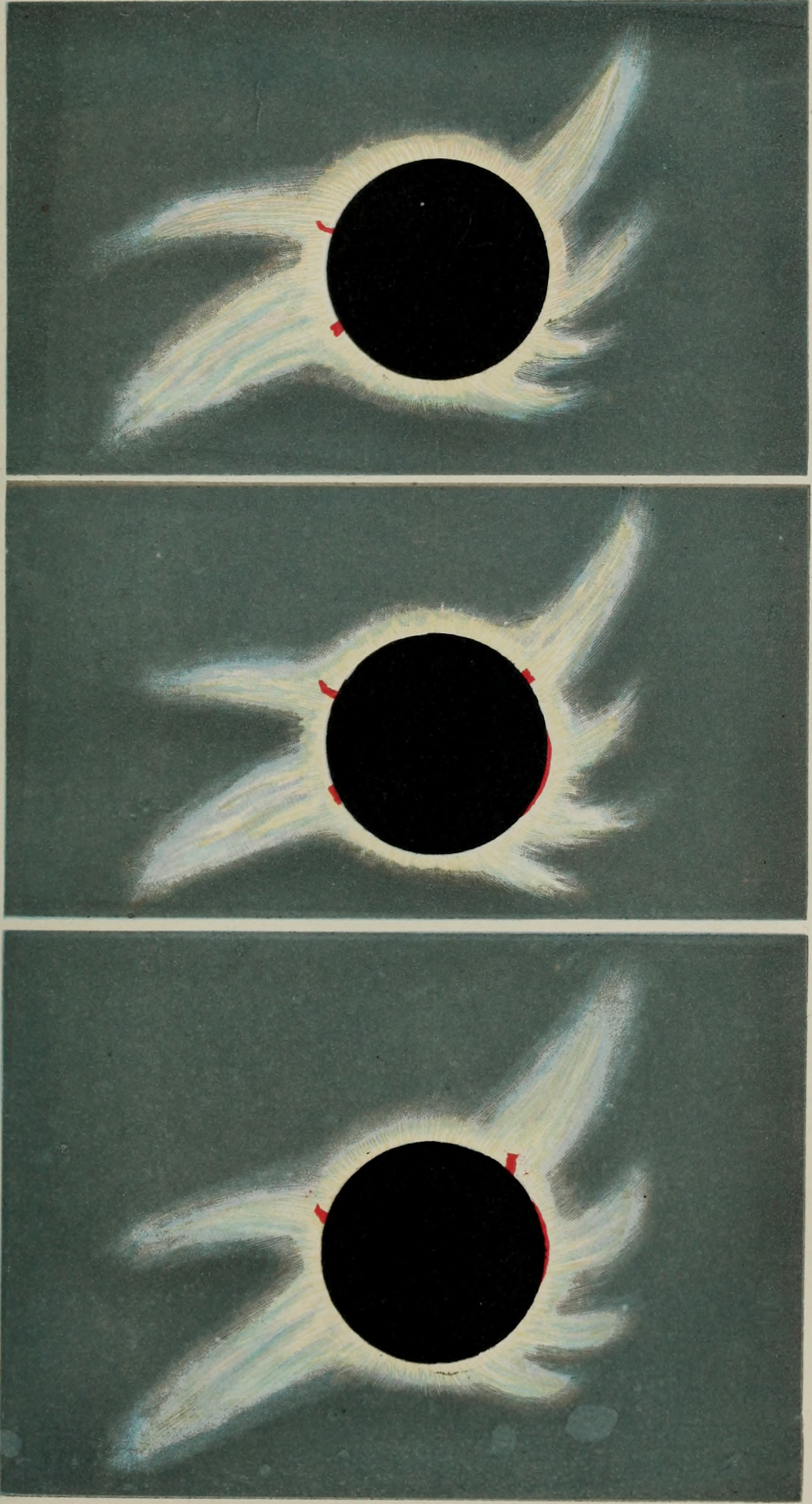
M. Stephan sketches of the eclipse, Archives des missions scientifiques et littéraires, 1868.

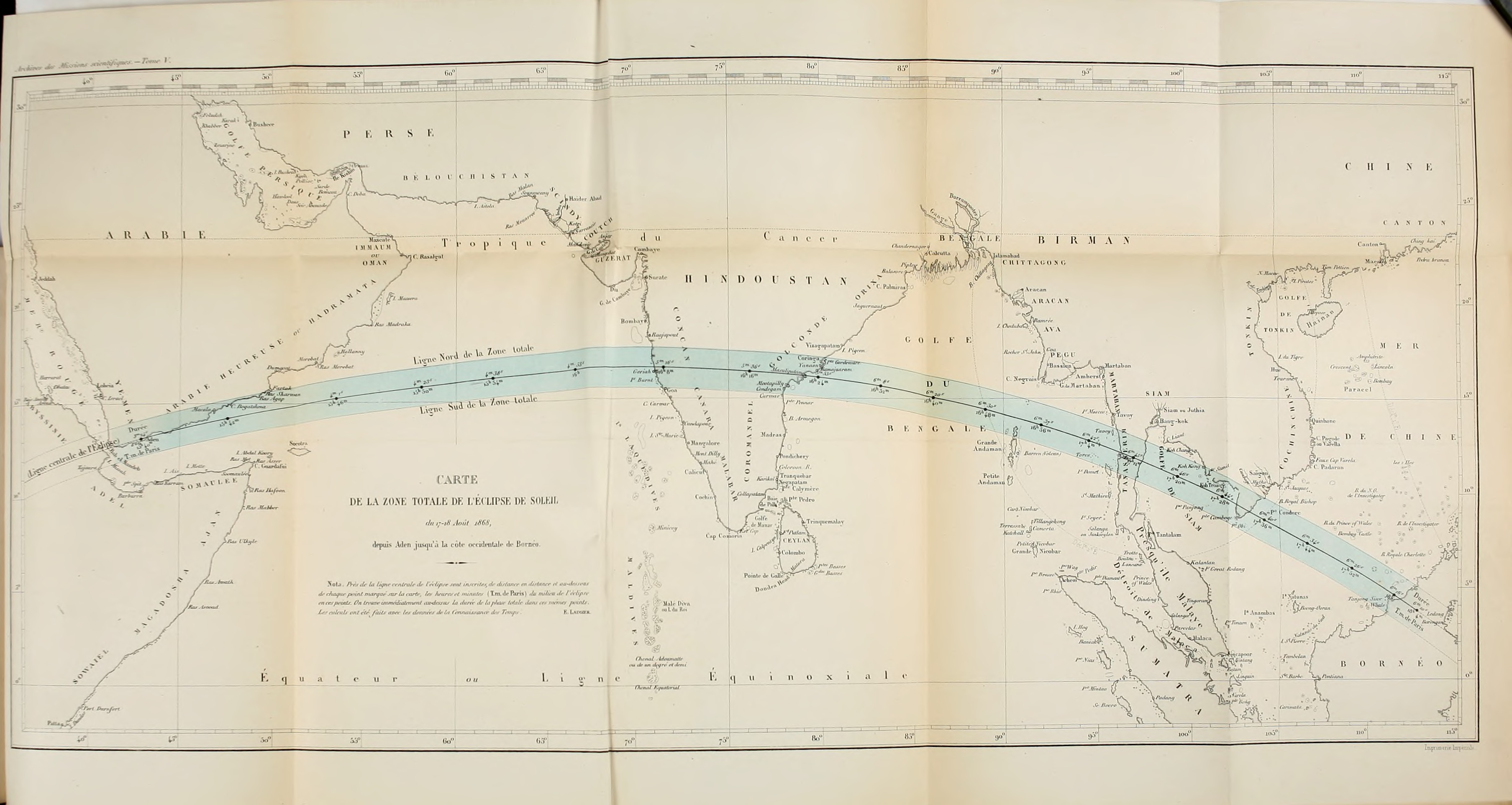
Map of the forecast path of the total eclipse, Archives des missions scientifiques et littéraires, 1868.

Several expeditions were sent to observe the eclipse.

- One of two expeditions from Germany was sent to Aden. The expedition was led by Gustav Spörer.
- The second expedition was sent to the west coast of India. The expedition was led by Friedrich Tietjen.
- Captain Bullock observed from the Celebes Sea, sketching the appearance of the corona, while Gustav Fritsch accompanied an expedition to Aden.

=== Discovery of helium ===
French astronomer Pierre Janssen observed the eclipse from Guntur in Madras State, British India. It was the first total eclipse since Gustav Kirchhoff's 1859 theory that the Fraunhofer lines in the solar spectrum correspond to the emission line of the different chemical elements present in the Sun. Correspondingly, Janssen observed the eclipse with the aid of a spectroscope. He noticed a bright yellow line (λ = 587.49 nm) in the spectra of the solar prominences that could not be due to sodium as had previously been assumed, and was subsequently able to observe the same line even without the need for an eclipse. The same result was found independently by British astronomer Norman Lockyer, and both Janssen's and Lockyer's communications were presented to the French Academy of Sciences on October 26, 1868.

=== King Mongkut's calculation ===
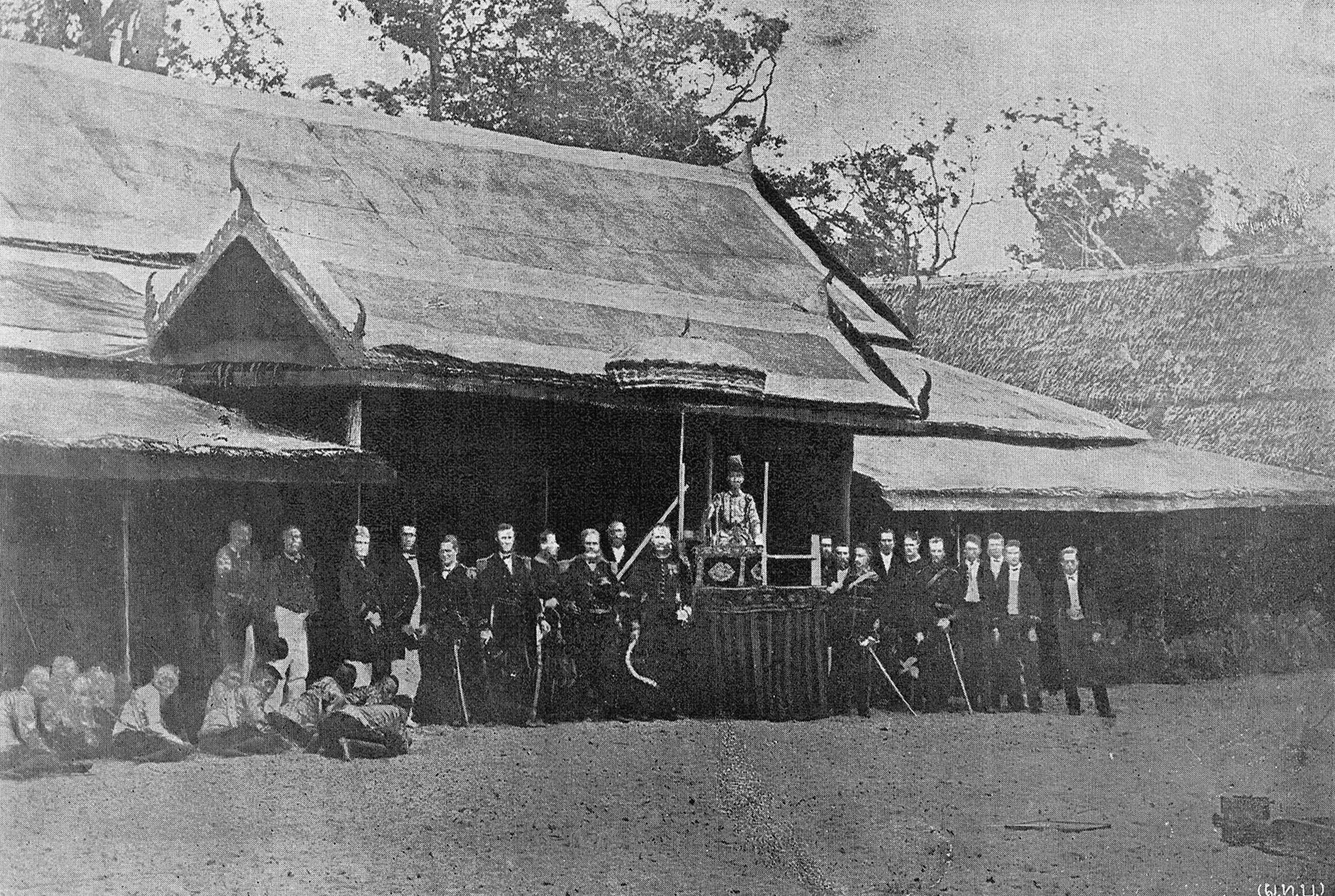
King Mongkut and his party observing the solar eclipse of 18 August 1868 at Hua Hin. The King is seated at the center of the pavilion; standing nearby is Sir Harry Ord, Governor of the Straits Settlements, with members of the British delegation, while Siamese officials kneel in attendance.

King Mongkut, Rama IV of Siam, predicted and calculated the solar eclipse two years prior. The calculations were correct as to the place, time, and type of the solar eclipse that would occur. His calculations were better — by about two seconds — than those of the French astronomers, who acknowledged his accuracy. Mongkut invited foreign dignitaries and scientists, including Sir Harry Ord, Governor of the Straits Settlements, and the French expedition led by Pierre Janssen that led to the discovery of helium. The event demonstrated Siam's engagement with modern science and diplomacy.

Mongkut was exposed to malaria around this time, developing chills and fever. He died a month and a half after the eclipse, on 1 October 1868. According to the Thai Astronomical Society and NASA, this eclipse is known as "The King of Siam's eclipse".

== Eclipse details ==
Shown below are two tables displaying details about this particular solar eclipse. The first table outlines times at which the Moon's penumbra or umbra attains the specific parameter, and the second table describes various other parameters pertaining to this eclipse.

August 18, 1868 Solar Eclipse Times
Event	Time (UTC)
First Penumbral External Contact	1868 August 18 at 02:34:50.2 UTC
First Umbral External Contact	1868 August 18 at 03:27:59.0 UTC
First Central Line	1868 August 18 at 03:29:29.6 UTC
First Umbral Internal Contact	1868 August 18 at 03:31:00.1 UTC
First Penumbral Internal Contact	1868 August 18 at 04:24:13.7 UTC
Greatest Duration	1868 August 18 at 05:08:35.7 UTC
Ecliptic Conjunction	1868 August 18 at 05:11:42.5 UTC
Greatest Eclipse	1868 August 18 at 05:12:09.6 UTC
Equatorial Conjunction	1868 August 18 at 05:13:17.9 UTC
Last Penumbral Internal Contact	1868 August 18 at 06:00:03.7 UTC
Last Umbral Internal Contact	1868 August 18 at 06:53:18.8 UTC
Last Central Line	1868 August 18 at 06:54:49.0 UTC
Last Umbral External Contact	1868 August 18 at 06:56:19.2 UTC
Last Penumbral External Contact	1868 August 18 at 07:49:29.4 UTC

August 18, 1868 Solar Eclipse Parameters
Parameter	Value
Eclipse Magnitude	1.07561
Eclipse Obscuration	1.15693
Gamma	−0.04434
Sun Right Ascension	09h51m00.1s
Sun Declination	+13°02'06.8"
Sun Semi-Diameter	15'48.4"
Sun Equatorial Horizontal Parallax	08.7"
Moon Right Ascension	09h50m57.4s
Moon Declination	+12°59'28.9"
Moon Semi-Diameter	16'42.8"
Moon Equatorial Horizontal Parallax	1°01'20.3"
ΔT	2.2 s

== Eclipse season ==
This eclipse is part of an eclipse season, a period, roughly every six months, when eclipses occur. Only two (or occasionally three) eclipse seasons occur each year, and each season lasts about 35 days and repeats just short of six months (173 days) later; thus two full eclipse seasons always occur each year. Either two or three eclipses happen each eclipse season. In the sequence below, each eclipse is separated by a fortnight.

Eclipse season of August–September 1868
August 3 Descending node (full moon)	August 18 Ascending node (new moon)	September 2 Descending node (full moon)
Penumbral lunar eclipse Lunar Saros 107	Total solar eclipse Solar Saros 133	Penumbral lunar eclipse Lunar Saros 145

== Related eclipses ==
=== Eclipses in 1868 ===
- A penumbral lunar eclipse on February 8.
- An annular solar eclipse on February 23.
- A penumbral lunar eclipse on March 8.
- A penumbral lunar eclipse on August 3.
- A total solar eclipse on August 18.
- A penumbral lunar eclipse on September 2.

=== Metonic ===
- Preceded by: Solar eclipse of October 30, 1864
- Followed by: Solar eclipse of June 6, 1872

=== Tzolkinex ===
- Preceded by: Solar eclipse of July 8, 1861
- Followed by: Solar eclipse of September 29, 1875

=== Half-Saros ===
- Preceded by: Lunar eclipse of August 13, 1859
- Followed by: Lunar eclipse of August 23, 1877

=== Tritos ===
- Preceded by: Solar eclipse of September 18, 1857
- Followed by: Solar eclipse of July 19, 1879

=== Solar Saros 133 ===
- Preceded by: Solar eclipse of August 7, 1850
- Followed by: Solar eclipse of August 29, 1886

=== Inex ===
- Preceded by: Solar eclipse of September 7, 1839
- Followed by: Solar eclipse of July 29, 1897

=== Triad ===
- Preceded by: Solar eclipse of October 17, 1781
- Followed by: Solar eclipse of June 20, 1955

=== Solar eclipses of 1866–1870 ===
This eclipse is a member of a semester series. An eclipse in a semester series of solar eclipses repeats approximately every 177 days and 4 hours (a semester) at alternating nodes of the Moon's orbit. The partial solar eclipses on April 15, 1866 and October 8, 1866 occur in the previous lunar year eclipse set, and the solar eclipses on June 28, 1870 (partial) and December 22, 1870 (total) occur in the next lunar year eclipse set.

Solar eclipse series sets from 1866 to 1870
Descending node			Ascending node		
Saros	Map	Gamma	Saros	Map	Gamma
108	March 16, 1866 Partial	1.4241	113		
118	March 6, 1867 Annular	0.7716	123	August 29, 1867 Total	−0.7940
128	February 23, 1868 Annular	0.0706	133	August 18, 1868 Total	−0.0443
138	February 11, 1869 Annular	−0.6251	143	August 7, 1869 Total	0.6960
148	January 31, 1870 Partial	−1.2829	153	July 28, 1870 Partial	1.5044

=== Saros 133 ===
This eclipse is a part of Saros series 133, repeating every 18 years, 11 days, and containing 72 events. The series started with a partial solar eclipse on July 13, 1219. It contains annular eclipses from November 20, 1435 through January 13, 1526; a hybrid eclipse on January 24, 1544; and total eclipses from February 3, 1562 through June 21, 2373. The series ends at member 72 as a partial eclipse on September 5, 2499. Its eclipses are tabulated in three columns; every third eclipse in the same column is one exeligmos apart, so they all cast shadows over approximately the same parts of the Earth.

The longest duration of annularity was produced by member 25 at 1 minutes, 14 seconds on November 30, 1453, and the longest duration of totality was produced by member 61 at 6 minutes, 50 seconds on August 7, 1850. All eclipses in this series occur at the Moon’s ascending node of orbit.

Series members 34–55 occur between 1801 and 2200:
34	35	36
July 17, 1814	July 27, 1832	August 7, 1850
37	38	39
August 18, 1868	August 29, 1886	September 9, 1904
40	41	42
September 21, 1922	October 1, 1940	October 12, 1958
43	44	45
October 23, 1976	November 3, 1994	November 13, 2012
46	47	48
November 25, 2030	December 5, 2048	December 17, 2066
49	50	51
December 27, 2084	January 8, 2103	January 19, 2121
52	53	54
January 30, 2139	February 9, 2157	February 21, 2175
55
March 3, 2193

=== Metonic series ===
The metonic series repeats eclipses every 19 years (6939.69 days), lasting about 5 cycles. Eclipses occur in nearly the same calendar date. In addition, the octon subseries repeats 1/5 of that or every 3.8 years (1387.94 days). All eclipses in this table occur at the Moon's ascending node.

24 eclipse events between March 25, 1819 and August 20, 1906
March 25–26	January 11–12	October 30–31	August 18–20	June 6–7
107	109	111	113	115
March 25, 1819	January 12, 1823	October 31, 1826	August 18, 1830	June 7, 1834
117	119	121	123	125
March 25, 1838	January 11, 1842	October 30, 1845	August 18, 1849	June 6, 1853
127	129	131	133	135
March 25, 1857	January 11, 1861	October 30, 1864	August 18, 1868	June 6, 1872
137	139	141	143	145
March 25, 1876	January 11, 1880	October 30, 1883	August 19, 1887	June 6, 1891
147	149	151	153	
March 26, 1895	January 11, 1899	October 31, 1902	August 20, 1906	

=== Tritos series ===
This eclipse is a part of a tritos cycle, repeating at alternating nodes every 135 synodic months (≈ 3986.63 days, or 11 years minus 1 month). Their appearance and longitude are irregular due to a lack of synchronization with the anomalistic month (period of perigee), but groupings of 3 tritos cycles (≈ 33 years minus 3 months) come close (≈ 434.044 anomalistic months), so eclipses are similar in these groupings.

Series members between 1801 and 2200
February 21, 1803 (Saros 127)	January 21, 1814 (Saros 128)	December 20, 1824 (Saros 129)	November 20, 1835 (Saros 130)	October 20, 1846 (Saros 131)
September 18, 1857 (Saros 132)	August 18, 1868 (Saros 133)	July 19, 1879 (Saros 134)	June 17, 1890 (Saros 135)	May 18, 1901 (Saros 136)
April 17, 1912 (Saros 137)	March 17, 1923 (Saros 138)	February 14, 1934 (Saros 139)	January 14, 1945 (Saros 140)	December 14, 1955 (Saros 141)
November 12, 1966 (Saros 142)	October 12, 1977 (Saros 143)	September 11, 1988 (Saros 144)	August 11, 1999 (Saros 145)	July 11, 2010 (Saros 146)
June 10, 2021 (Saros 147)	May 9, 2032 (Saros 148)	April 9, 2043 (Saros 149)	March 9, 2054 (Saros 150)	February 5, 2065 (Saros 151)
January 6, 2076 (Saros 152)	December 6, 2086 (Saros 153)	November 4, 2097 (Saros 154)	October 5, 2108 (Saros 155)	September 5, 2119 (Saros 156)
August 4, 2130 (Saros 157)	July 3, 2141 (Saros 158)	June 3, 2152 (Saros 159)		April 1, 2174 (Saros 161)

=== Inex series ===
This eclipse is a part of the long period inex cycle, repeating at alternating nodes, every 358 synodic months (≈ 10,571.95 days, or 29 years minus 20 days). Their appearance and longitude are irregular due to a lack of synchronization with the anomalistic month (period of perigee). However, groupings of 3 inex cycles (≈ 87 years minus 2 months) comes close (≈ 1,151.02 anomalistic months), so eclipses are similar in these groupings.

Series members between 1801 and 2200
September 28, 1810 (Saros 131)	September 7, 1839 (Saros 132)	August 18, 1868 (Saros 133)
July 29, 1897 (Saros 134)	July 9, 1926 (Saros 135)	June 20, 1955 (Saros 136)
May 30, 1984 (Saros 137)	May 10, 2013 (Saros 138)	April 20, 2042 (Saros 139)
March 31, 2071 (Saros 140)	March 10, 2100 (Saros 141)	February 18, 2129 (Saros 142)
January 30, 2158 (Saros 143)	January 9, 2187 (Saros 144)	
