= Solar eclipse of October 1, 1940 =

Total eclipse

- Total eclipse
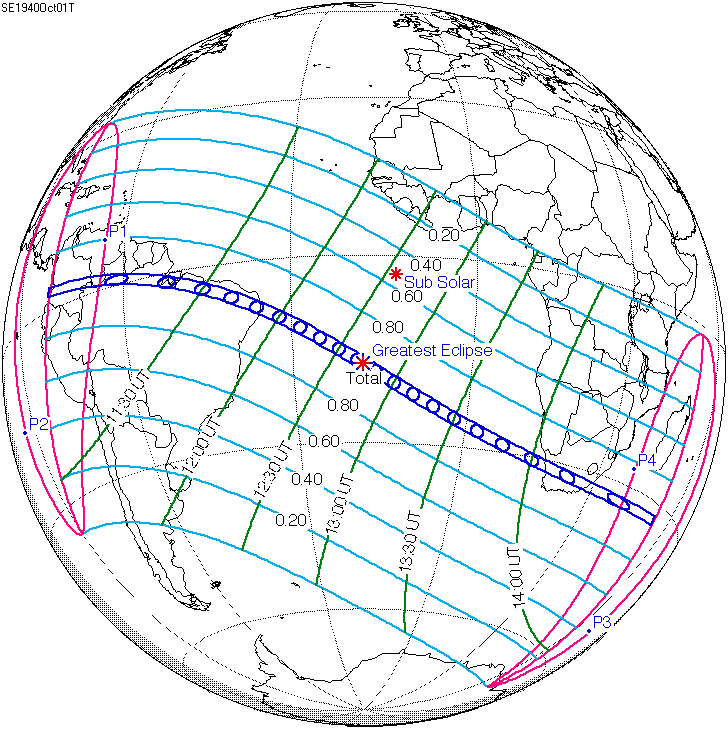
- Map
- Gamma: −0.2573
- Magnitude: 1.0645

Maximum eclipse
- Duration: 335 s (5 min 35 s)
- Coordinates: 17.5°S 18.2°W
- Max. width of band: 218 km (135 mi)

Times (UTC)
- Greatest eclipse: 12:44:06

References
- Saros: 133 (41 of 72)
- Catalog # (SE5000): 9376

A total solar eclipse occurred at the Moon's ascending node of orbit on Tuesday, October 1, 1940, with a magnitude of 1.0645. A solar eclipse occurs when the Moon passes between Earth and the Sun, thereby totally or partly obscuring the image of the Sun for a viewer on Earth. A total solar eclipse occurs when the Moon's apparent diameter is larger than the Sun's, blocking all direct sunlight, turning day into darkness. Totality occurs in a narrow path across Earth's surface, with the partial solar eclipse visible over a surrounding region thousands of kilometres wide. Occurring about 4 hours before perigee (on October 1, 1940, at 17:00 UTC), the Moon's apparent diameter was larger.

Totality was visible from Colombia, Brazil, Venezuela and South Africa. A partial eclipse was visible for parts of the Caribbean, South America, Central Africa, and Southern Africa.

== Observation ==
Members of the Joint Permanent Eclipse Committee of the Royal Society and Royal Astronomical Society made observations in Brazil with interferometers and spectrometers. Teams of the Royal Observatory, Greenwich and Royal Observatory, Cape of Good Hope (now combined into the South African Astronomical Observatory) went to Calvinia, South Africa to study the gravitational lens proposed by the general relativity. Other scientists went to the edge of the path of totality to study the spectral lines of the solar chromosphere. A joint team of the Heliophysical Observatory of the University of Cambridge and the Radcliffe Observatory in Pretoria, South Africa (now combined into the South African Astronomical Observatory) went to Nelspoort to study the extreme ultraviolet spectrum of the chromosphere and corona, and conducted polarization studies of the corona and sky around the sun.

== Eclipse details ==
Shown below are two tables displaying details about this particular solar eclipse. The first table outlines times at which the Moon's penumbra or umbra attains the specific parameter, and the second table describes various other parameters pertaining to this eclipse.

October 1, 1940 Solar Eclipse Times
| Event | Time (UTC) |
|---|---|
| First Penumbral External Contact | 1940 October 1 at 10:08:37.5 UTC |
| First Umbral External Contact | 1940 October 1 at 11:03:28.3 UTC |
| First Central Line | 1940 October 1 at 11:04:45.3 UTC |
| First Umbral Internal Contact | 1940 October 1 at 11:06:02.4 UTC |
| First Penumbral Internal Contact | 1940 October 1 at 12:04:11.7 UTC |
| Ecliptic Conjunction | 1940 October 1 at 12:41:28.7 UTC |
| Greatest Eclipse | 1940 October 1 at 12:44:06.1 UTC |
| Greatest Duration | 1940 October 1 at 12:45:03.9 UTC |
| Equatorial Conjunction | 1940 October 1 at 12:52:28.6 UTC |
| Last Penumbral Internal Contact | 1940 October 1 at 13:23:47.3 UTC |
| Last Umbral Internal Contact | 1940 October 1 at 14:22:03.5 UTC |
| Last Central Line | 1940 October 1 at 14:23:20.8 UTC |
| Last Umbral External Contact | 1940 October 1 at 14:24:38.0 UTC |
| Last Penumbral External Contact | 1940 October 1 at 15:19:30.5 UTC |

October 1, 1940 Solar Eclipse Parameters
| Parameter | Value |
|---|---|
| Eclipse Magnitude | 1.06446 |
| Eclipse Obscuration | 1.13307 |
| Gamma | −0.25727 |
| Sun Right Ascension | 12h30m03.1s |
| Sun Declination | -03°14'42.9" |
| Sun Semi-Diameter | 15'58.8" |
| Sun Equatorial Horizontal Parallax | 08.8" |
| Moon Right Ascension | 12h29m44.0s |
| Moon Declination | -03°29'44.3" |
| Moon Semi-Diameter | 16'43.8" |
| Moon Equatorial Horizontal Parallax | 1°01'24.1" |
| ΔT | 24.7 s |

== Eclipse season ==
This eclipse is part of an eclipse season, a period, roughly every six months, when eclipses occur. Only two (or occasionally three) eclipse seasons occur each year, and each season lasts about 35 days and repeats just short of six months (173 days) later; thus two full eclipse seasons always occur each year. Either two or three eclipses happen each eclipse season. In the sequence below, each eclipse is separated by a fortnight.

Eclipse season of October 1940
| October 1 Ascending node (new moon) | October 16 Descending node (full moon) |
|---|---|
| Total solar eclipse Solar Saros 133 | Penumbral lunar eclipse Lunar Saros 145 |

== Related eclipses ==
=== Eclipses in 1940 ===
- A penumbral lunar eclipse on March 23.
- An annular solar eclipse on April 7.
- A penumbral lunar eclipse on April 22.
- A total solar eclipse on October 1.
- A penumbral lunar eclipse on October 16.

=== Metonic ===
- Preceded by: Solar eclipse of December 13, 1936
- Followed by: Solar eclipse of July 20, 1944

=== Tzolkinex ===
- Preceded by: Solar eclipse of August 21, 1933
- Followed by: Solar eclipse of November 12, 1947

=== Half-Saros ===
- Preceded by: Lunar eclipse of September 26, 1931
- Followed by: Lunar eclipse of October 7, 1949

=== Tritos ===
- Preceded by: Solar eclipse of November 1, 1929
- Followed by: Solar eclipse of September 1, 1951

=== Solar Saros 133 ===
- Preceded by: Solar eclipse of September 21, 1922
- Followed by: Solar eclipse of October 12, 1958

=== Inex ===
- Preceded by: Solar eclipse of October 22, 1911
- Followed by: Solar eclipse of September 11, 1969

=== Triad ===
- Preceded by: Solar eclipse of November 30, 1853
- Followed by: Solar eclipse of August 2, 2027

=== Solar eclipses of 1939–1942 ===
This eclipse is a member of a semester series. An eclipse in a semester series of solar eclipses repeats approximately every 177 days and 4 hours (a semester) at alternating nodes of the Moon's orbit.

The partial solar eclipse on August 12, 1942 occurs in the next lunar year eclipse set.

Solar eclipse series sets from 1939 to 1942
| Descending node | | | Ascending node | | |
| Saros | Map | Gamma | Saros | Map | Gamma |
| 118 | April 19, 1939 Annular | 0.9388 | 123 | October 12, 1939 Total | −0.9737 |
| 128 | April 7, 1940 Annular | 0.219 | 133 | October 1, 1940 Total | −0.2573 |
| 138 | March 27, 1941 Annular | −0.5025 | 143 | September 21, 1941 Total | 0.4649 |
| 148 | March 16, 1942 Partial | −1.1908 | 153 | September 10, 1942 Partial | 1.2571 |

=== Saros 133 ===
This eclipse is a part of Saros series 133, repeating every 18 years, 11 days, and containing 72 events. The series started with a partial solar eclipse on July 13, 1219. It contains annular eclipses from November 20, 1435 through January 13, 1526; a hybrid eclipse on January 24, 1544; and total eclipses from February 3, 1562 through June 21, 2373. The series ends at member 72 as a partial eclipse on September 5, 2499. Its eclipses are tabulated in three columns; every third eclipse in the same column is one exeligmos apart, so they all cast shadows over approximately the same parts of the Earth.

The longest duration of annularity was produced by member 25 at 1 minutes, 14 seconds on November 30, 1453, and the longest duration of totality was produced by member 61 at 6 minutes, 50 seconds on August 7, 1850. All eclipses in this series occur at the Moon’s ascending node of orbit.

Series members 34–55 occur between 1801 and 2200:
| 34 | 35 | 36 |
|---|---|---|
| July 17, 1814 | July 27, 1832 | August 7, 1850 |
| 37 | 38 | 39 |
| August 18, 1868 | August 29, 1886 | September 9, 1904 |
| 40 | 41 | 42 |
| September 21, 1922 | October 1, 1940 | October 12, 1958 |
| 43 | 44 | 45 |
| October 23, 1976 | November 3, 1994 | November 13, 2012 |
| 46 | 47 | 48 |
| November 25, 2030 | December 5, 2048 | December 17, 2066 |
| 49 | 50 | 51 |
| December 27, 2084 | January 8, 2103 | January 19, 2121 |
| 52 | 53 | 54 |
| January 30, 2139 | February 9, 2157 | February 21, 2175 |
55
March 3, 2193

=== Metonic series ===
The metonic series repeats eclipses every 19 years (6939.69 days), lasting about 5 cycles. Eclipses occur in nearly the same calendar date. In addition, the octon subseries repeats 1/5 of that or every 3.8 years (1387.94 days). All eclipses in this table occur at the Moon's ascending node.

22 eclipse events between December 13, 1898 and July 20, 1982
| December 13–14 | October 1–2 | July 20–21 | May 9 | February 24–25 |
| 111 | 113 | 115 | 117 | 119 |
|---|---|---|---|---|
| December 13, 1898 | | July 21, 1906 | May 9, 1910 | February 25, 1914 |
| 121 | 123 | 125 | 127 | 129 |
| December 14, 1917 | October 1, 1921 | July 20, 1925 | May 9, 1929 | February 24, 1933 |
| 131 | 133 | 135 | 137 | 139 |
| December 13, 1936 | October 1, 1940 | July 20, 1944 | May 9, 1948 | February 25, 1952 |
| 141 | 143 | 145 | 147 | 149 |
| December 14, 1955 | October 2, 1959 | July 20, 1963 | May 9, 1967 | February 25, 1971 |
| 151 | 153 | 155 | | |
| December 13, 1974 | October 2, 1978 | July 20, 1982 | | |

=== Tritos series ===
This eclipse is a part of a tritos cycle, repeating at alternating nodes every 135 synodic months (≈ 3986.63 days, or 11 years minus 1 month). Their appearance and longitude are irregular due to a lack of synchronization with the anomalistic month (period of perigee), but groupings of 3 tritos cycles (≈ 33 years minus 3 months) come close (≈ 434.044 anomalistic months), so eclipses are similar in these groupings.

Series members between 1801 and 2200
| October 9, 1809 (Saros 121) | September 7, 1820 (Saros 122) | August 7, 1831 (Saros 123) | July 8, 1842 (Saros 124) | June 6, 1853 (Saros 125) |
| May 6, 1864 (Saros 126) | April 6, 1875 (Saros 127) | March 5, 1886 (Saros 128) | February 1, 1897 (Saros 129) | January 3, 1908 (Saros 130) |
| December 3, 1918 (Saros 131) | November 1, 1929 (Saros 132) | October 1, 1940 (Saros 133) | September 1, 1951 (Saros 134) | July 31, 1962 (Saros 135) |
| June 30, 1973 (Saros 136) | May 30, 1984 (Saros 137) | April 29, 1995 (Saros 138) | March 29, 2006 (Saros 139) | February 26, 2017 (Saros 140) |
| January 26, 2028 (Saros 141) | December 26, 2038 (Saros 142) | November 25, 2049 (Saros 143) | October 24, 2060 (Saros 144) | September 23, 2071 (Saros 145) |
| August 24, 2082 (Saros 146) | July 23, 2093 (Saros 147) | June 22, 2104 (Saros 148) | May 24, 2115 (Saros 149) | April 22, 2126 (Saros 150) |
| March 21, 2137 (Saros 151) | February 19, 2148 (Saros 152) | January 19, 2159 (Saros 153) | December 18, 2169 (Saros 154) | November 17, 2180 (Saros 155) |
October 18, 2191 (Saros 156)

=== Inex series ===
This eclipse is a part of the long period inex cycle, repeating at alternating nodes, every 358 synodic months (≈ 10,571.95 days, or 29 years minus 20 days). Their appearance and longitude are irregular due to a lack of synchronization with the anomalistic month (period of perigee). However, groupings of 3 inex cycles (≈ 87 years minus 2 months) comes close (≈ 1,151.02 anomalistic months), so eclipses are similar in these groupings.

Series members between 1801 and 2200
| December 20, 1824 (Saros 129) | November 30, 1853 (Saros 130) | November 10, 1882 (Saros 131) |
| October 22, 1911 (Saros 132) | October 1, 1940 (Saros 133) | September 11, 1969 (Saros 134) |
| August 22, 1998 (Saros 135) | August 2, 2027 (Saros 136) | July 12, 2056 (Saros 137) |
| June 22, 2085 (Saros 138) | June 3, 2114 (Saros 139) | May 14, 2143 (Saros 140) |
| April 23, 2172 (Saros 141) | | |
