= Solar eclipse of December 5, 2048 =

Total eclipse

- Total eclipse
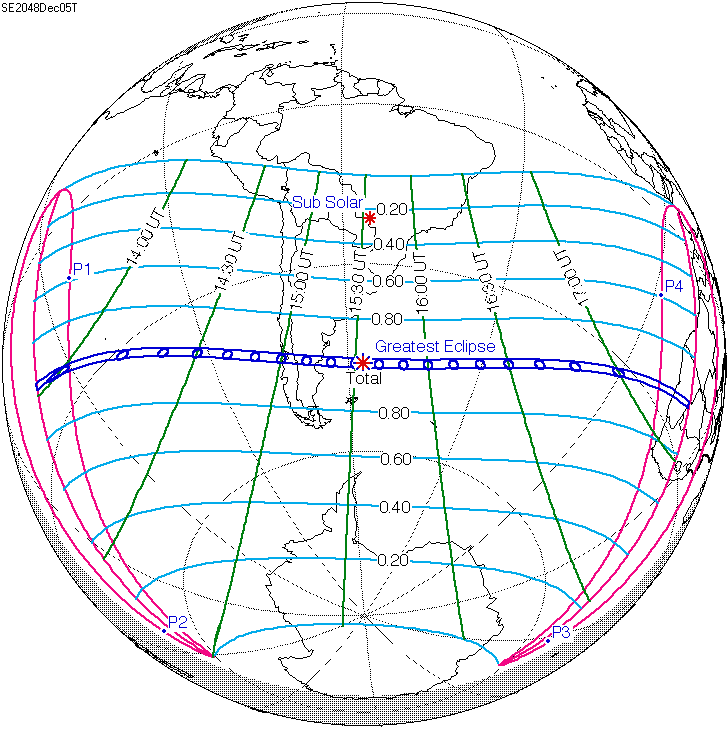
- Map
- Gamma: −0.3973
- Magnitude: 1.044

Maximum eclipse
- Duration: 208 s (3 min 28 s)
- Coordinates: 46.1°S 56.4°W
- Max. width of band: 160 km (99 mi)

Times (UTC)
- Greatest eclipse: 15:35:27

References
- Saros: 133 (47 of 72)
- Catalog # (SE5000): 9616

A total solar eclipse will occur at the Moon's ascending node of orbit on Saturday, December 5, 2048, with a magnitude of 1.044. A solar eclipse occurs when the Moon passes between Earth and the Sun, thereby totally or partly obscuring the image of the Sun for a viewer on Earth. A total solar eclipse occurs when the Moon's apparent diameter is greater than the Sun's, blocking all direct sunlight. Totality occurs in a narrow path across Earth's surface, with the partial solar eclipse visible over a surrounding region thousands of kilometres wide. Occurring about 16.5 hours before perigee (on December 6, 2048, at 8:00 UTC), the Moon's apparent diameter will be larger.

The path of totality will be visible from parts of Chile, Argentina, Namibia, and Botswana. A partial solar eclipse will also be visible for parts of southern and central South America, Antarctica, and Southern Africa.

== Images ==
Animated path

== Eclipse timing ==
=== Places experiencing total eclipse ===
Solar Eclipse of December 5, 2048 (Local Times)
Country or territory	City or place	Start of partial eclipse	Start of total eclipse	Maximum eclipse	End of total eclipse	End of partial eclipse	Duration of totality (min:s)	Duration of eclipse (hr:min)	Maximum magnitude
Argentina	Facundo	10:54:13	12:08:48	12:10:01	12:11:14	13:29:59	2:26	2:36	1.007
Argentina	Comodoro Rivadavia	10:58:07	12:13:53	12:14:37	12:15:21	13:34:37	1:28	2:37	1.0023
Argentina	Camarones	10:59:17	12:16:10	12:17:00	12:17:50	13:37:57	1:40	2:39	1.0032
Saint Helena, Ascension and Tristan da Cunha	Edinburgh of the Seven Seas	15:37:55	16:46:40	16:47:55	16:49:08	17:50:45	2:28	2:13	1.0189

=== Places experiencing partial eclipse ===
Solar Eclipse of December 5, 2048 (Local Times)
Country or territory	City or place	Start of partial eclipse	Maximum eclipse	End of partial eclipse	Duration of eclipse (hr:min)	Maximum coverage
Pitcairn Islands	Adamstown	05:42:32 (sunrise)	06:03:01	06:57:26	1:15	90.11%
Chile	Easter Island	08:07:37	09:04:55	10:08:46	2:01	91.86%
French Polynesia	Gambier Islands	05:05:55 (sunrise)	05:08:31	05:55:30	0:50	83.39%
Chile	Santiago	10:42:06	11:57:58	13:20:35	2:38	61.05%
Paraguay	Asunción	11:16:24	12:27:46	13:40:25	2:24	24.12%
Argentina	Buenos Aires	11:06:43	12:28:07	13:51:01	2:44	58.50%
Falkland Islands	Stanley	11:18:02	12:32:39	13:47:43	2:30	82.69%
Uruguay	Montevideo	11:11:36	12:33:45	13:56:14	2:45	59.28%
Brazil	Pelotas	11:22:41	12:44:01	14:03:36	2:41	47.05%
Brazil	Rio Grande	11:23:04	12:44:39	14:04:19	2:41	48.08%
Antarctica	Orcadas Base	11:43:37	12:47:37	13:50:28	2:07	50.90%
South Georgia and the South Sandwich Islands	King Edward Point	12:50:24	14:01:06	15:08:46	2:18	69.02%
Brazil	São Paulo	11:54:22	13:03:51	14:09:02	2:15	19.99%
Brazil	Rio de Janeiro	12:06:01	13:14:30	14:17:32	2:12	20.03%
Mozambique	Maputo	18:11:42	18:28:38	18:31:17 (sunset)	0:20	20.98%
Eswatini	Mbabane	18:11:41	18:29:40	18:37:45 (sunset)	0:26	22.65%
Bouvet Island	Bouvet Island	16:37:40	17:30:20	18:20:06	1:42	38.61%
Zambia	Mongu	18:21:35	18:45:40	18:48:07 (sunset)	0:27	33.55%
South Africa	Johannesburg	18:12:05	18:47:13	18:49:53 (sunset)	0:38	57.17%
Botswana	Gaborone	18:13:23	18:52:32	18:55:10 (sunset)	0:42	67.36%
Lesotho	Maseru	18:09:53	18:56:15	18:59:02 (sunset)	0:49	70.80%
South Africa	Cape Town	18:04:55	18:58:52	19:46:30 (sunset)	1:42	71.30%
Botswana	Ghanzi	18:16:02	19:03:40	19:06:13 (sunset)	0:50	88.20%
Angola	Menongue	17:23:11	18:05:43	18:08:46 (sunset)	0:46	63.78%
Botswana	Tshane	18:14:01	19:07:24	19:10:01 (sunset)	0:56	96.01%
Namibia	Windhoek	18:15:08	19:10:05	19:26:15 (sunset)	1:11	97.85%
Angola	Huambo	17:25:34	18:10:45	18:13:17 (sunset)	0:48	60.01%
Angola	Luanda	17:31:04	18:13:33	18:16:25 (sunset)	0:45	44.30%
Saint Helena, Ascension and Tristan da Cunha	Jamestown	16:18:30	17:15:29	18:06:41	1:48	42.50%
Angola	Lubango	17:23:19	18:16:43	18:26:03 (sunset)	1:03	67.23%

== Eclipse details ==
Shown below are two tables displaying details about this particular solar eclipse. The first table outlines times at which the Moon's penumbra or umbra attains the specific parameter, and the second table describes various other parameters pertaining to this eclipse.

December 5, 2048 Solar Eclipse Times
Event	Time (UTC)
First Penumbral External Contact	2048 December 5 at 13:01:48.0 UTC
First Umbral External Contact	2048 December 5 at 13:59:50.8 UTC
First Central Line	2048 December 5 at 14:00:39.2 UTC
First Umbral Internal Contact	2048 December 5 at 14:01:27.6 UTC
First Penumbral Internal Contact	2048 December 5 at 15:11:41.9 UTC
Ecliptic Conjunction	2048 December 5 at 15:31:22.2 UTC
Greatest Eclipse	2048 December 5 at 15:35:26.7 UTC
Greatest Duration	2048 December 5 at 15:36:11.2 UTC
Equatorial Conjunction	2048 December 5 at 15:36:12.8 UTC
Last Penumbral Internal Contact	2048 December 5 at 15:59:10.8 UTC
Last Umbral Internal Contact	2048 December 5 at 17:09:24.3 UTC
Last Central Line	2048 December 5 at 17:10:13.5 UTC
Last Umbral External Contact	2048 December 5 at 17:11:02.7 UTC
Last Penumbral External Contact	2048 December 5 at 18:09:03.3 UTC

December 5, 2048 Solar Eclipse Parameters
Parameter	Value
Eclipse Magnitude	1.04400
Eclipse Obscuration	1.08994
Gamma	−0.39728
Sun Right Ascension	16h51m20.5s
Sun Declination	-22°29'40.9"
Sun Semi-Diameter	16'13.8"
Sun Equatorial Horizontal Parallax	08.9"
Moon Right Ascension	16h51m18.6s
Moon Declination	-22°53'56.4"
Moon Semi-Diameter	16'40.9"
Moon Equatorial Horizontal Parallax	1°01'13.3"
ΔT	83.5 s

== Eclipse season ==
This eclipse is part of an eclipse season, a period, roughly every six months, when eclipses occur. Only two (or occasionally three) eclipse seasons occur each year, and each season lasts about 35 days and repeats just short of six months (173 days) later; thus two full eclipse seasons always occur each year. Either two or three eclipses happen each eclipse season. In the sequence below, each eclipse is separated by a fortnight.

Eclipse season of December 2048
December 5 Ascending node (new moon)	December 20 Descending node (full moon)
Total solar eclipse Solar Saros 133	Penumbral lunar eclipse Lunar Saros 145

== Related eclipses ==
=== Eclipses in 2048 ===
- A total lunar eclipse on January 1.
- An annular solar eclipse on June 11.
- A partial lunar eclipse on June 26.
- A total solar eclipse on December 5.
- A penumbral lunar eclipse on December 20.

=== Metonic ===
- Preceded by: Solar eclipse of February 16, 2045
- Followed by: Solar eclipse of September 22, 2052

=== Tzolkinex ===
- Preceded by: Solar eclipse of October 25, 2041
- Followed by: Solar eclipse of January 16, 2056

=== Half-Saros ===
- Preceded by: Lunar eclipse of November 30, 2039
- Followed by: Lunar eclipse of December 11, 2057

=== Tritos ===
- Preceded by: Solar eclipse of January 5, 2038
- Followed by: Solar eclipse of November 5, 2059

=== Solar Saros 133 ===
- Preceded by: Solar eclipse of November 25, 2030
- Followed by: Solar eclipse of December 17, 2066

=== Inex ===
- Preceded by: Solar eclipse of December 26, 2019
- Followed by: Solar eclipse of November 15, 2077

=== Triad ===
- Preceded by: Solar eclipse of February 5, 1962
- Followed by: Solar eclipse of October 7, 2135

=== Solar eclipses of 2047–2050 ===
This eclipse is a member of a semester series. An eclipse in a semester series of solar eclipses repeats approximately every 177 days and 4 hours (a semester) at alternating nodes of the Moon's orbit.

The partial solar eclipses on January 26, 2047 and July 22, 2047 occur in the previous lunar year eclipse set.

Solar eclipse series sets from 2047 to 2050
Descending node			Ascending node		
Saros	Map	Gamma	Saros	Map	Gamma
118	June 23, 2047 Partial	1.3766	123	December 16, 2047 Partial	−1.0661
128	June 11, 2048 Annular	0.6468	133	December 5, 2048 Total	−0.3973
138	May 31, 2049 Annular	−0.1187	143	November 25, 2049 Hybrid	0.2943
148	May 20, 2050 Hybrid	−0.8688	153	November 14, 2050 Partial	1.0447

=== Saros 133 ===
This eclipse is a part of Saros series 133, repeating every 18 years, 11 days, and containing 72 events. The series started with a partial solar eclipse on July 13, 1219. It contains annular eclipses from November 20, 1435 through January 13, 1526; a hybrid eclipse on January 24, 1544; and total eclipses from February 3, 1562 through June 21, 2373. The series ends at member 72 as a partial eclipse on September 5, 2499. Its eclipses are tabulated in three columns; every third eclipse in the same column is one exeligmos apart, so they all cast shadows over approximately the same parts of the Earth.

The longest duration of annularity was produced by member 25 at 1 minutes, 14 seconds on November 30, 1453, and the longest duration of totality was produced by member 61 at 6 minutes, 50 seconds on August 7, 1850. All eclipses in this series occur at the Moon’s ascending node of orbit.

Series members 34–55 occur between 1801 and 2200:
34	35	36
July 17, 1814	July 27, 1832	August 7, 1850
37	38	39
August 18, 1868	August 29, 1886	September 9, 1904
40	41	42
September 21, 1922	October 1, 1940	October 12, 1958
43	44	45
October 23, 1976	November 3, 1994	November 13, 2012
46	47	48
November 25, 2030	December 5, 2048	December 17, 2066
49	50	51
December 27, 2084	January 8, 2103	January 19, 2121
52	53	54
January 30, 2139	February 9, 2157	February 21, 2175
55
March 3, 2193

=== Metonic series ===
The metonic series repeats eclipses every 19 years (6939.69 days), lasting about 5 cycles. Eclipses occur in nearly the same calendar date. In addition, the octon subseries repeats 1/5 of that or every 3.8 years (1387.94 days). All eclipses in this table occur at the Moon's ascending node.

21 eclipse events between July 13, 2018 and July 12, 2094
July 12–13	April 30–May 1	February 16–17	December 5–6	September 22–23
117	119	121	123	125
July 13, 2018	April 30, 2022	February 17, 2026	December 5, 2029	September 23, 2033
127	129	131	133	135
July 13, 2037	April 30, 2041	February 16, 2045	December 5, 2048	September 22, 2052
137	139	141	143	145
July 12, 2056	April 30, 2060	February 17, 2064	December 6, 2067	September 23, 2071
147	149	151	153	155
July 13, 2075	May 1, 2079	February 16, 2083	December 6, 2086	September 23, 2090
157
July 12, 2094

=== Tritos series ===
This eclipse is a part of a tritos cycle, repeating at alternating nodes every 135 synodic months (≈ 3986.63 days, or 11 years minus 1 month). Their appearance and longitude are irregular due to a lack of synchronization with the anomalistic month (period of perigee), but groupings of 3 tritos cycles (≈ 33 years minus 3 months) come close (≈ 434.044 anomalistic months), so eclipses are similar in these groupings.

Series members between 1801 and 2200
October 19, 1808 (Saros 111)	September 19, 1819 (Saros 112)	August 18, 1830 (Saros 113)	July 18, 1841 (Saros 114)	June 17, 1852 (Saros 115)
May 17, 1863 (Saros 116)	April 16, 1874 (Saros 117)	March 16, 1885 (Saros 118)	February 13, 1896 (Saros 119)	January 14, 1907 (Saros 120)
December 14, 1917 (Saros 121)	November 12, 1928 (Saros 122)	October 12, 1939 (Saros 123)	September 12, 1950 (Saros 124)	August 11, 1961 (Saros 125)
July 10, 1972 (Saros 126)	June 11, 1983 (Saros 127)	May 10, 1994 (Saros 128)	April 8, 2005 (Saros 129)	March 9, 2016 (Saros 130)
February 6, 2027 (Saros 131)	January 5, 2038 (Saros 132)	December 5, 2048 (Saros 133)	November 5, 2059 (Saros 134)	October 4, 2070 (Saros 135)
September 3, 2081 (Saros 136)	August 3, 2092 (Saros 137)	July 4, 2103 (Saros 138)	June 3, 2114 (Saros 139)	May 3, 2125 (Saros 140)
April 1, 2136 (Saros 141)	March 2, 2147 (Saros 142)	January 30, 2158 (Saros 143)	December 29, 2168 (Saros 144)	November 28, 2179 (Saros 145)
October 29, 2190 (Saros 146)

=== Inex series ===
This eclipse is a part of the long period inex cycle, repeating at alternating nodes, every 358 synodic months (≈ 10,571.95 days, or 29 years minus 20 days). Their appearance and longitude are irregular due to a lack of synchronization with the anomalistic month (period of perigee). However, groupings of 3 inex cycles (≈ 87 years minus 2 months) comes close (≈ 1,151.02 anomalistic months), so eclipses are similar in these groupings.

Series members between 1801 and 2200
May 16, 1817 (Saros 125)	April 25, 1846 (Saros 126)	April 6, 1875 (Saros 127)
March 17, 1904 (Saros 128)	February 24, 1933 (Saros 129)	February 5, 1962 (Saros 130)
January 15, 1991 (Saros 131)	December 26, 2019 (Saros 132)	December 5, 2048 (Saros 133)
November 15, 2077 (Saros 134)	October 26, 2106 (Saros 135)	October 7, 2135 (Saros 136)
September 16, 2164 (Saros 137)	August 26, 2193 (Saros 138)	
