= Solar eclipse of September 21, 1922 =

Total eclipse

- Total eclipse
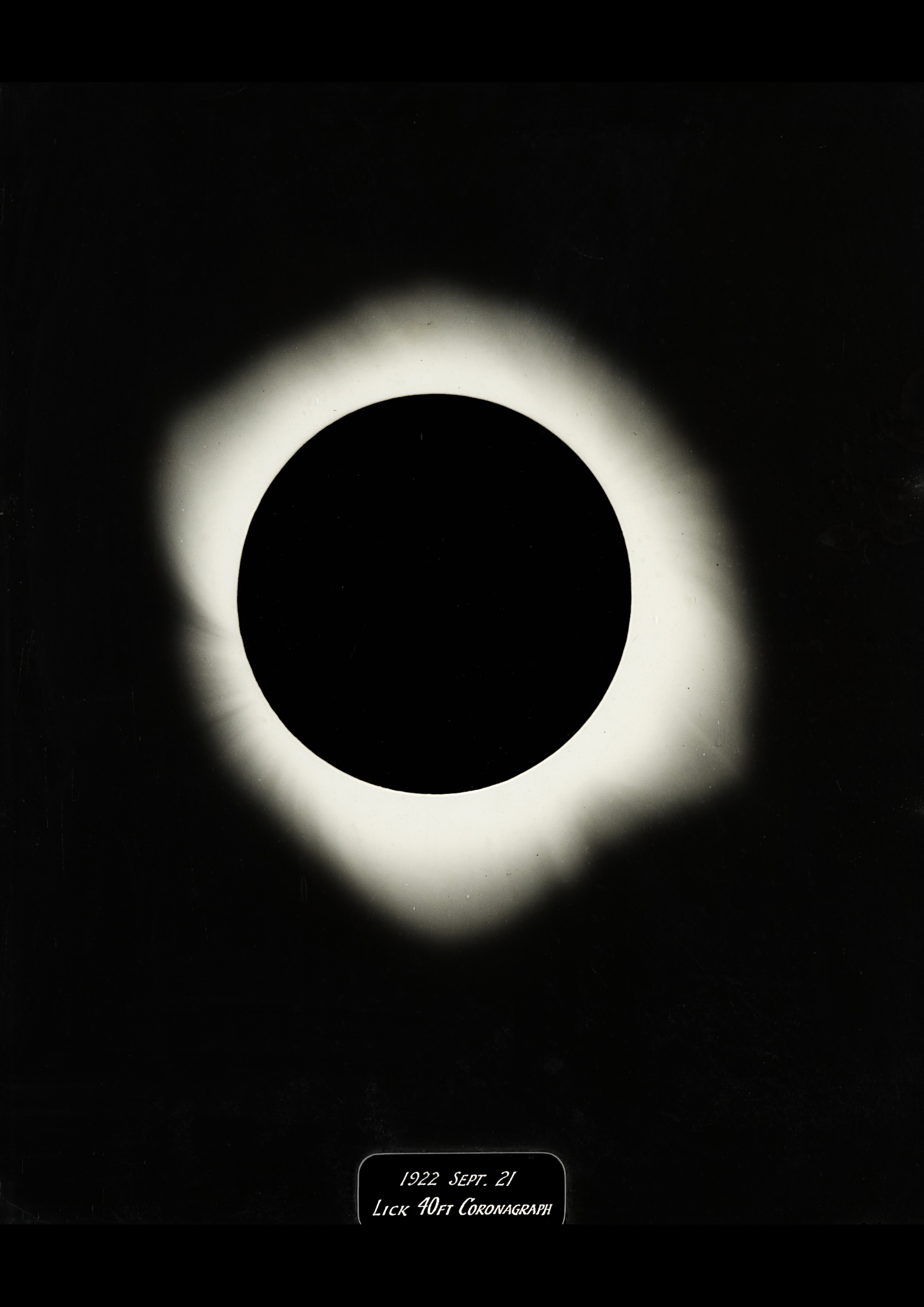

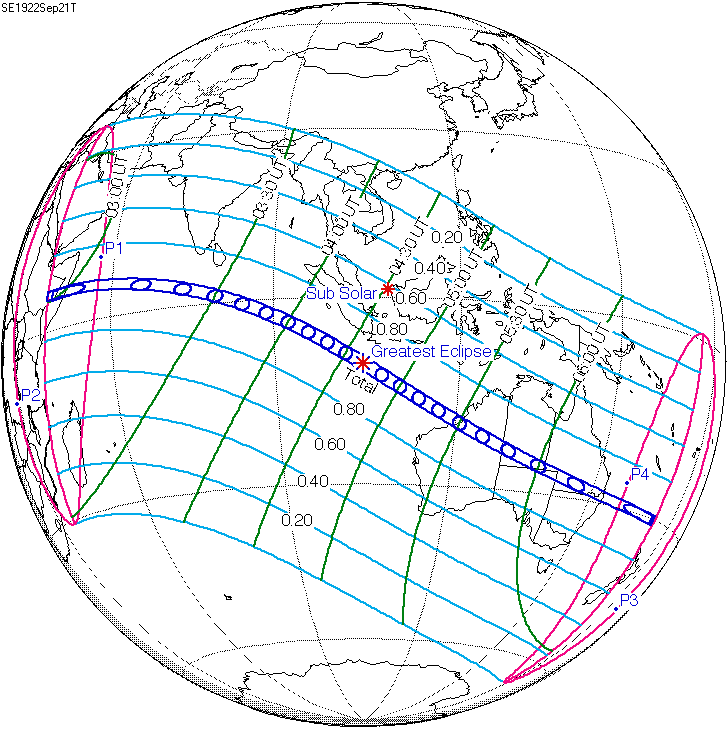
- Map
- Gamma: −0.213
- Magnitude: 1.0678

Maximum eclipse
- Duration: 359 s (5 min 59 s)
- Coordinates: 10.7°S 104.5°E
- Max. width of band: 226 km (140 mi)

Times (UTC)
- Greatest eclipse: 4:40:31

References
- Saros: 133 (40 of 72)
- Catalog # (SE5000): 9333

A total solar eclipse occurred at the Moon's ascending node of orbit on Thursday, September 21, 1922, with a magnitude of 1.0678. A solar eclipse occurs when the Moon passes between Earth and the Sun, thereby totally or partly obscuring the image of the Sun for a viewer on Earth. A total solar eclipse occurs when the Moon's apparent diameter is larger than the Sun's, blocking all direct sunlight, turning day into darkness. Totality occurs in a narrow path across Earth's surface, with the partial solar eclipse visible over a surrounding region thousands of kilometres wide. Occurring about 2 hours after perigee (on September 21, 1922, at 6:30 UTC), the Moon's apparent diameter was larger. Perigee did occur as the eclipse was past its greatest eclipse.

Totality started in Ethiopia, Italian Somaliland (today's Somalia), and passed British Maldives and Christmas Island in the Straits Settlements (now in Australia) in the Indian Ocean, and Australia. A partial eclipse was visible for parts of East Africa, South Asia, Southeast Asia, Australia, and Oceania.

== Observations ==
Observations of the total solar eclipse of May 29, 1919 got results consistent with gravitational lens proposed by Einstein's general relativity. To reconfirm the result, observatories in South Australia and New South Wales each organized a large scientific expedition. A total of 20 teams went to sparsely populated Wallal on the northern coast of Western Australia. Among them, the American team from the Lick Observatory arrived in Sydney on August 5, took a train westward and arrived in Perth on August 16. The team took a ship on August 20 from Fremantle, a port southwest of Perth, to Broome, and then finally arrived at Wallal. Although not organizing any observations, the Australian government provided financial support to the teams. For example, the round-trip travel expenses between Sydney and Wallal were paid by the federal government.

== Eclipse details ==
Shown below are two tables displaying details about this particular solar eclipse. The first table outlines times at which the Moon's penumbra or umbra attains the specific parameter, and the second table describes various other parameters pertaining to this eclipse.

September 21, 1922 Solar Eclipse Times
Event	Time (UTC)
First Penumbral External Contact	1922 September 21 at 02:04:28.6 UTC
First Umbral External Contact	1922 September 21 at 02:58:45.3 UTC
First Central Line	1922 September 21 at 03:00:06.4 UTC
First Umbral Internal Contact	1922 September 21 at 03:01:27.5 UTC
First Penumbral Internal Contact	1922 September 21 at 03:57:50.9 UTC
Ecliptic Conjunction	1922 September 21 at 04:38:20.9 UTC
Greatest Duration	1922 September 21 at 04:40:07.8 UTC
Greatest Eclipse	1922 September 21 at 04:40:31.1 UTC
Equatorial Conjunction	1922 September 21 at 04:47:31.9 UTC
Last Penumbral Internal Contact	1922 September 21 at 05:23:00.2 UTC
Last Umbral Internal Contact	1922 September 21 at 06:19:29.4 UTC
Last Central Line	1922 September 21 at 06:20:50.6 UTC
Last Umbral External Contact	1922 September 21 at 06:22:11.7 UTC
Last Penumbral External Contact	1922 September 21 at 07:16:30.2 UTC

September 21, 1922 Solar Eclipse Parameters
Parameter	Value
Eclipse Magnitude	1.06783
Eclipse Obscuration	1.14026
Gamma	−0.21299
Sun Right Ascension	11h50m29.6s
Sun Declination	+01°01'49.3"
Sun Semi-Diameter	15'56.0"
Sun Equatorial Horizontal Parallax	08.8"
Moon Right Ascension	11h50m13.7s
Moon Declination	+00°49'23.8"
Moon Semi-Diameter	16'43.8"
Moon Equatorial Horizontal Parallax	1°01'24.1"
ΔT	22.8 s

== Eclipse season ==
This eclipse is part of an eclipse season, a period, roughly every six months, when eclipses occur. Only two (or occasionally three) eclipse seasons occur each year, and each season lasts about 35 days and repeats just short of six months (173 days) later; thus two full eclipse seasons always occur each year. Either two or three eclipses happen each eclipse season. In the sequence below, each eclipse is separated by a fortnight.

Eclipse season of September–October 1922
September 21 Ascending node (new moon)	October 6 Descending node (full moon)
Annular solar eclipse Solar Saros 133	Penumbral lunar eclipse Lunar Saros 145

== Related eclipses ==
=== Eclipses in 1922 ===
- A penumbral lunar eclipse on March 13.
- An annular solar eclipse on March 28.
- A penumbral lunar eclipse on April 11.
- A total solar eclipse on September 21.
- A penumbral lunar eclipse on October 6.

=== Metonic ===
- Preceded by: Solar eclipse of December 3, 1918
- Followed by: Solar eclipse of July 9, 1926

=== Tzolkinex ===
- Preceded by: Solar eclipse of August 10, 1915
- Followed by: Solar eclipse of November 1, 1929

=== Half-Saros ===
- Preceded by: Lunar eclipse of September 15, 1913
- Followed by: Lunar eclipse of September 26, 1931

=== Tritos ===
- Preceded by: Solar eclipse of October 22, 1911
- Followed by: Solar eclipse of August 21, 1933

=== Solar Saros 133 ===
- Preceded by: Solar eclipse of September 9, 1904
- Followed by: Solar eclipse of October 1, 1940

=== Inex ===
- Preceded by: Solar eclipse of October 9, 1893
- Followed by: Solar eclipse of September 1, 1951

=== Triad ===
- Preceded by: Solar eclipse of November 20, 1835
- Followed by: Solar eclipse of July 22, 2009

=== Solar eclipses of 1921–1924 ===
This eclipse is a member of a semester series. An eclipse in a semester series of solar eclipses repeats approximately every 177 days and 4 hours (a semester) at alternating nodes of the Moon's orbit.

The partial solar eclipse on July 31, 1924 occurs in the next lunar year eclipse set.

Solar eclipse series sets from 1921 to 1924
Descending node			Ascending node		
Saros	Map	Gamma	Saros	Map	Gamma
118	April 8, 1921 Annular	0.8869	123	October 1, 1921 Total	−0.9383
128	March 28, 1922 Annular	0.1711	133	September 21, 1922 Total	−0.213
138	March 17, 1923 Annular	−0.5438	143	September 10, 1923 Total	0.5149
148	March 5, 1924 Partial	−1.2232	153	August 30, 1924 Partial	1.3123

=== Saros 133 ===
This eclipse is a part of Saros series 133, repeating every 18 years, 11 days, and containing 72 events. The series started with a partial solar eclipse on July 13, 1219. It contains annular eclipses from November 20, 1435 through January 13, 1526; a hybrid eclipse on January 24, 1544; and total eclipses from February 3, 1562 through June 21, 2373. The series ends at member 72 as a partial eclipse on September 5, 2499. Its eclipses are tabulated in three columns; every third eclipse in the same column is one exeligmos apart, so they all cast shadows over approximately the same parts of the Earth.

The longest duration of annularity was produced by member 25 at 1 minutes, 14 seconds on November 30, 1453, and the longest duration of totality was produced by member 61 at 6 minutes, 50 seconds on August 7, 1850. All eclipses in this series occur at the Moon’s ascending node of orbit.

Series members 34–55 occur between 1801 and 2200:
34	35	36
July 17, 1814	July 27, 1832	August 7, 1850
37	38	39
August 18, 1868	August 29, 1886	September 9, 1904
40	41	42
September 21, 1922	October 1, 1940	October 12, 1958
43	44	45
October 23, 1976	November 3, 1994	November 13, 2012
46	47	48
November 25, 2030	December 5, 2048	December 17, 2066
49	50	51
December 27, 2084	January 8, 2103	January 19, 2121
52	53	54
January 30, 2139	February 9, 2157	February 21, 2175
55
March 3, 2193

=== Metonic series ===
The metonic series repeats eclipses every 19 years (6939.69 days), lasting about 5 cycles. Eclipses occur in nearly the same calendar date. In addition, the octon subseries repeats 1/5 of that or every 3.8 years (1387.94 days). All eclipses in this table occur at the Moon's ascending node.

22 eclipse events between December 2, 1880 and July 9, 1964
December 2–3	September 20–21	July 9–10	April 26–28	February 13–14
111	113	115	117	119
December 2, 1880		July 9, 1888	April 26, 1892	February 13, 1896
121	123	125	127	129
December 3, 1899	September 21, 1903	July 10, 1907	April 28, 1911	February 14, 1915
131	133	135	137	139
December 3, 1918	September 21, 1922	July 9, 1926	April 28, 1930	February 14, 1934
141	143	145	147	149
December 2, 1937	September 21, 1941	July 9, 1945	April 28, 1949	February 14, 1953
151	153	155		
December 2, 1956	September 20, 1960	July 9, 1964		

=== Tritos series ===
This eclipse is a part of a tritos cycle, repeating at alternating nodes every 135 synodic months (≈ 3986.63 days, or 11 years minus 1 month). Their appearance and longitude are irregular due to a lack of synchronization with the anomalistic month (period of perigee), but groupings of 3 tritos cycles (≈ 33 years minus 3 months) come close (≈ 434.044 anomalistic months), so eclipses are similar in these groupings.

Series members between 1801 and 2200
August 28, 1802 (Saros 122)	July 27, 1813 (Saros 123)	June 26, 1824 (Saros 124)	May 27, 1835 (Saros 125)	April 25, 1846 (Saros 126)
March 25, 1857 (Saros 127)	February 23, 1868 (Saros 128)	January 22, 1879 (Saros 129)	December 22, 1889 (Saros 130)	November 22, 1900 (Saros 131)
October 22, 1911 (Saros 132)	September 21, 1922 (Saros 133)	August 21, 1933 (Saros 134)	July 20, 1944 (Saros 135)	June 20, 1955 (Saros 136)
May 20, 1966 (Saros 137)	April 18, 1977 (Saros 138)	March 18, 1988 (Saros 139)	February 16, 1999 (Saros 140)	January 15, 2010 (Saros 141)
December 14, 2020 (Saros 142)	November 14, 2031 (Saros 143)	October 14, 2042 (Saros 144)	September 12, 2053 (Saros 145)	August 12, 2064 (Saros 146)
July 13, 2075 (Saros 147)	June 11, 2086 (Saros 148)	May 11, 2097 (Saros 149)	April 11, 2108 (Saros 150)	March 11, 2119 (Saros 151)
February 8, 2130 (Saros 152)	January 8, 2141 (Saros 153)	December 8, 2151 (Saros 154)	November 7, 2162 (Saros 155)	October 7, 2173 (Saros 156)
September 4, 2184 (Saros 157)	August 5, 2195 (Saros 158)			

=== Inex series ===
This eclipse is a part of the long period inex cycle, repeating at alternating nodes, every 358 synodic months (≈ 10,571.95 days, or 29 years minus 20 days). Their appearance and longitude are irregular due to a lack of synchronization with the anomalistic month (period of perigee). However, groupings of 3 inex cycles (≈ 87 years minus 2 months) comes close (≈ 1,151.02 anomalistic months), so eclipses are similar in these groupings.

Series members between 1801 and 2200
December 10, 1806 (Saros 129)	November 20, 1835 (Saros 130)	October 30, 1864 (Saros 131)
October 9, 1893 (Saros 132)	September 21, 1922 (Saros 133)	September 1, 1951 (Saros 134)
August 10, 1980 (Saros 135)	July 22, 2009 (Saros 136)	July 2, 2038 (Saros 137)
June 11, 2067 (Saros 138)	May 22, 2096 (Saros 139)	May 3, 2125 (Saros 140)
April 12, 2154 (Saros 141)	March 23, 2183 (Saros 142)	
