= Solar eclipse of April 8, 1652 =

Total eclipse

- Total eclipse
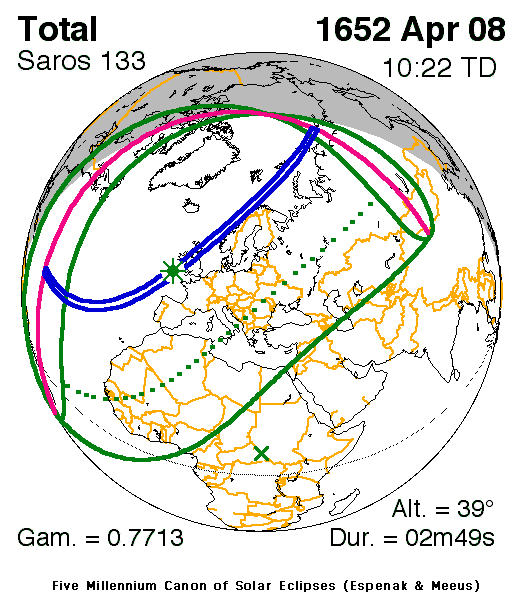
- Map
- Gamma: 0.7713
- Magnitude: 1.0412

Maximum eclipse
- Duration: 169 s (2 min 49 s)
- Coordinates: 49.6°N 8.9°W
- Max. width of band: 213 km (132 mi)

Times (UTC)
- Greatest eclipse: 10:22:28

References
- Saros: 133 (25 of 72)
- Catalog # (SE5000): 8666

A total solar eclipse occurred on Monday, April 8 [O.S. March 29] 1652. The path of totality intersected the British Isles, including the town of Carrickfergus in Ireland, and passed just off the west coast of Norway.

The day acquired the name "Mirk Monday" in Scotland, due to the darkness that fell across the country. Contemporary astrologers Nicholas Culpeper and William Lilly made broad and catastrophic predictions of the eclipse's effects on the world, which attracted criticism in the aftermath of the event as their predictions failed to happen.

One 19th century source misreported the date of the eclipse as March 24, 1652.

== Observations ==
Observing the eclipse from Carrickfergus, Ireland, Dr. John Wybard wrote:

Luna momento quasi, et eximproviso, totam se intra Disci Solis orbitam seu ambitum (quatenus conspectui nostro appareret) tam agiliter injiciebat; ut circumagere aut circumvolutare videretur, sicut catillus, seu lapis molaris superior; Sole tunc circum-circa, ejus limbum seu marginem splendidulo vel corusco, apparente.

The Moon, as if at that moment, and unexpectedly, threw itself so very nimbly between the entire path or circuit of the Sun’s disc (in so far as it appeared to our sight); so that it seemed to move in a circle or roll around, like a plate or upper mill-stone; with the Sun, glowing or rather shimmering, all around its rim or edge.

== See also ==
- List of solar eclipses visible from the United Kingdom 1000–2090 AD
