= Solar eclipse of October 23, 1976 =

Total eclipse

- Total eclipse
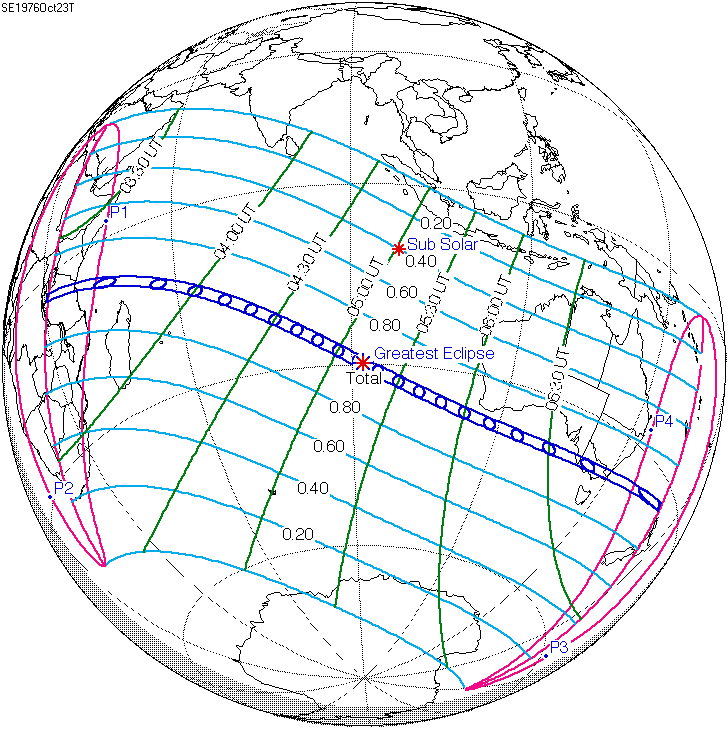
- Map
- Gamma: −0.327
- Magnitude: 1.0572

Maximum eclipse
- Duration: 286 s (4 min 46 s)
- Coordinates: 30°S 92.3°E
- Max. width of band: 199 km (124 mi)

Times (UTC)
- Greatest eclipse: 5:13:45

References
- Saros: 133 (43 of 72)
- Catalog # (SE5000): 9457

A total solar eclipse occurred at the Moon's ascending node of orbit on Saturday, October 23, 1976, with a magnitude of 1.0572. A solar eclipse occurs when the Moon passes between Earth and the Sun, thereby totally or partly obscuring the image of the Sun for a viewer on Earth. A total solar eclipse occurs when the Moon's apparent diameter is larger than the Sun's, blocking all direct sunlight, turning day into darkness. Totality occurs in a narrow path across Earth's surface, with the partial solar eclipse visible over a surrounding region thousands of kilometres wide. Occurring about 9 hours before perigee (on October 23, 1976, at 14:00 UTC), the Moon's apparent diameter was larger.

This total solar eclipse began at sunrise in Tanzania near the border with Burundi, with the path of totality passing just north of the large Tanzanian city of Dar es Salaam. It then crossed the Indian Ocean, passing St. Pierre Island, Providence Atoll and Farquhar Atoll of Seychelles before making landfall in southeastern Australia. The largest city that saw totality was Melbourne. After leaving the Australian mainland, the path of totality left the Earth's surface just north of the north island of New Zealand. A partial eclipse was visible for parts of East Africa, Indonesia, Australia, Antarctica, and western Oceania.

== Eclipse details ==
Shown below are two tables displaying details about this particular solar eclipse. The first table outlines times at which the Moon's penumbra or umbra attains the specific parameter, and the second table describes various other parameters pertaining to this eclipse.

October 23, 1976 Solar Eclipse Times
Event	Time (UTC)
First Penumbral External Contact	1976 October 23 at 02:39:17.5 UTC
First Umbral External Contact	1976 October 23 at 03:35:21.3 UTC
First Central Line	1976 October 23 at 03:36:28.9 UTC
First Umbral Internal Contact	1976 October 23 at 03:37:36.6 UTC
First Penumbral Internal Contact	1976 October 23 at 04:39:57.2 UTC
Ecliptic Conjunction	1976 October 23 at 05:10:25.1 UTC
Greatest Eclipse	1976 October 23 at 05:13:45.3 UTC
Greatest Duration	1976 October 23 at 05:16:15.1 UTC
Equatorial Conjunction	1976 October 23 at 05:22:43.8 UTC
Last Penumbral Internal Contact	1976 October 23 at 05:47:19.5 UTC
Last Umbral Internal Contact	1976 October 23 at 06:49:47.0 UTC
Last Central Line	1976 October 23 at 06:50:55.2 UTC
Last Umbral External Contact	1976 October 23 at 06:52:03.2 UTC
Last Penumbral External Contact	1976 October 23 at 07:48:08.1 UTC

October 23, 1976 Solar Eclipse Parameters
Parameter	Value
Eclipse Magnitude	1.05716
Eclipse Obscuration	1.11758
Gamma	−0.32699
Sun Right Ascension	13h51m21.8s
Sun Declination	-11°26'48.5"
Sun Semi-Diameter	16'04.7"
Sun Equatorial Horizontal Parallax	08.8"
Moon Right Ascension	13h51m00.8s
Moon Declination	-11°46'09.2"
Moon Semi-Diameter	16'43.4"
Moon Equatorial Horizontal Parallax	1°01'22.6"
ΔT	47.3 s

== Eclipse season ==
This eclipse is part of an eclipse season, a period, roughly every six months, when eclipses occur. Only two (or occasionally three) eclipse seasons occur each year, and each season lasts about 35 days and repeats just short of six months (173 days) later; thus two full eclipse seasons always occur each year. Either two or three eclipses happen each eclipse season. In the sequence below, each eclipse is separated by a fortnight.

Eclipse season of October–November 1976
October 23 Ascending node (new moon)	November 6 Descending node (full moon)
Total solar eclipse Solar Saros 133	Penumbral lunar eclipse Lunar Saros 145

== Related eclipses ==
=== Eclipses in 1976 ===
- An annular solar eclipse on April 29.
- A partial lunar eclipse on May 13.
- A total solar eclipse on October 23.
- A penumbral lunar eclipse on November 6.

=== Metonic ===
- Preceded by: Solar eclipse of January 4, 1973
- Followed by: Solar eclipse of August 10, 1980

=== Tzolkinex ===
- Preceded by: Solar eclipse of September 11, 1969
- Followed by: Solar eclipse of December 4, 1983

=== Half-Saros ===
- Preceded by: Lunar eclipse of October 18, 1967
- Followed by: Lunar eclipse of October 28, 1985

=== Tritos ===
- Preceded by: Solar eclipse of November 23, 1965
- Followed by: Solar eclipse of September 23, 1987

=== Solar Saros 133 ===
- Preceded by: Solar eclipse of October 12, 1958
- Followed by: Solar eclipse of November 3, 1994

=== Inex ===
- Preceded by: Solar eclipse of November 12, 1947
- Followed by: Solar eclipse of October 3, 2005

=== Triad ===
- Preceded by: Solar eclipse of December 22, 1889
- Followed by: Solar eclipse of August 24, 2063

=== Solar eclipses of 1975–1978 ===
This eclipse is a member of a semester series. An eclipse in a semester series of solar eclipses repeats approximately every 177 days and 4 hours (a semester) at alternating nodes of the Moon's orbit.

Solar eclipse series sets from 1975 to 1978
Descending node			Ascending node		
Saros	Map	Gamma	Saros	Map	Gamma
118	May 11, 1975 Partial	1.0647	123	November 3, 1975 Partial	−1.0248
128	April 29, 1976 Annular	0.3378	133	October 23, 1976 Total	−0.327
138	April 18, 1977 Annular	−0.399	143	October 12, 1977 Total	0.3836
148	April 7, 1978 Partial	−1.1081	153	October 2, 1978 Partial	1.1616

=== Saros 133 ===
This eclipse is a part of Saros series 133, repeating every 18 years, 11 days, and containing 72 events. The series started with a partial solar eclipse on July 13, 1219. It contains annular eclipses from November 20, 1435 through January 13, 1526; a hybrid eclipse on January 24, 1544; and total eclipses from February 3, 1562 through June 21, 2373. The series ends at member 72 as a partial eclipse on September 5, 2499. Its eclipses are tabulated in three columns; every third eclipse in the same column is one exeligmos apart, so they all cast shadows over approximately the same parts of the Earth.

The longest duration of annularity was produced by member 25 at 1 minutes, 14 seconds on November 30, 1453, and the longest duration of totality was produced by member 61 at 6 minutes, 50 seconds on August 7, 1850. All eclipses in this series occur at the Moon’s ascending node of orbit.

Series members 34–55 occur between 1801 and 2200:
34	35	36
July 17, 1814	July 27, 1832	August 7, 1850
37	38	39
August 18, 1868	August 29, 1886	September 9, 1904
40	41	42
September 21, 1922	October 1, 1940	October 12, 1958
43	44	45
October 23, 1976	November 3, 1994	November 13, 2012
46	47	48
November 25, 2030	December 5, 2048	December 17, 2066
49	50	51
December 27, 2084	January 8, 2103	January 19, 2121
52	53	54
January 30, 2139	February 9, 2157	February 21, 2175
55
March 3, 2193

=== Metonic series ===
The metonic series repeats eclipses every 19 years (6939.69 days), lasting about 5 cycles. Eclipses occur in nearly the same calendar date. In addition, the octon subseries repeats 1/5 of that or every 3.8 years (1387.94 days). All eclipses in this table occur at the Moon's ascending node.

22 eclipse events between January 5, 1935 and August 11, 2018
January 4–5	October 23–24	August 10–12	May 30–31	March 18–19
111	113	115	117	119
January 5, 1935		August 12, 1942	May 30, 1946	March 18, 1950
121	123	125	127	129
January 5, 1954	October 23, 1957	August 11, 1961	May 30, 1965	March 18, 1969
131	133	135	137	139
January 4, 1973	October 23, 1976	August 10, 1980	May 30, 1984	March 18, 1988
141	143	145	147	149
January 4, 1992	October 24, 1995	August 11, 1999	May 31, 2003	March 19, 2007
151	153	155		
January 4, 2011	October 23, 2014	August 11, 2018		

=== Tritos series ===
This eclipse is a part of a tritos cycle, repeating at alternating nodes every 135 synodic months (≈ 3986.63 days, or 11 years minus 1 month). Their appearance and longitude are irregular due to a lack of synchronization with the anomalistic month (period of perigee), but groupings of 3 tritos cycles (≈ 33 years minus 3 months) come close (≈ 434.044 anomalistic months), so eclipses are similar in these groupings.

Series members between 1801 and 2200
March 4, 1802 (Saros 117)	February 1, 1813 (Saros 118)	January 1, 1824 (Saros 119)	November 30, 1834 (Saros 120)	October 30, 1845 (Saros 121)
September 29, 1856 (Saros 122)	August 29, 1867 (Saros 123)	July 29, 1878 (Saros 124)	June 28, 1889 (Saros 125)	May 28, 1900 (Saros 126)
April 28, 1911 (Saros 127)	March 28, 1922 (Saros 128)	February 24, 1933 (Saros 129)	January 25, 1944 (Saros 130)	December 25, 1954 (Saros 131)
November 23, 1965 (Saros 132)	October 23, 1976 (Saros 133)	September 23, 1987 (Saros 134)	August 22, 1998 (Saros 135)	July 22, 2009 (Saros 136)
June 21, 2020 (Saros 137)	May 21, 2031 (Saros 138)	April 20, 2042 (Saros 139)	March 20, 2053 (Saros 140)	February 17, 2064 (Saros 141)
January 16, 2075 (Saros 142)	December 16, 2085 (Saros 143)	November 15, 2096 (Saros 144)	October 16, 2107 (Saros 145)	September 15, 2118 (Saros 146)
August 15, 2129 (Saros 147)	July 14, 2140 (Saros 148)	June 14, 2151 (Saros 149)	May 14, 2162 (Saros 150)	April 12, 2173 (Saros 151)
March 12, 2184 (Saros 152)	February 10, 2195 (Saros 153)			

=== Inex series ===
This eclipse is a part of the long period inex cycle, repeating at alternating nodes, every 358 synodic months (≈ 10,571.95 days, or 29 years minus 20 days). Their appearance and longitude are irregular due to a lack of synchronization with the anomalistic month (period of perigee). However, groupings of 3 inex cycles (≈ 87 years minus 2 months) comes close (≈ 1,151.02 anomalistic months), so eclipses are similar in these groupings.

Series members between 1801 and 2200
February 21, 1803 (Saros 127)	February 1, 1832 (Saros 128)	January 11, 1861 (Saros 129)
December 22, 1889 (Saros 130)	December 3, 1918 (Saros 131)	November 12, 1947 (Saros 132)
October 23, 1976 (Saros 133)	October 3, 2005 (Saros 134)	September 12, 2034 (Saros 135)
August 24, 2063 (Saros 136)	August 3, 2092 (Saros 137)	July 14, 2121 (Saros 138)
June 25, 2150 (Saros 139)	June 5, 2179 (Saros 140)	
