= Solar eclipse of August 2, 2027 =

Solar eclipse

- Total eclipse
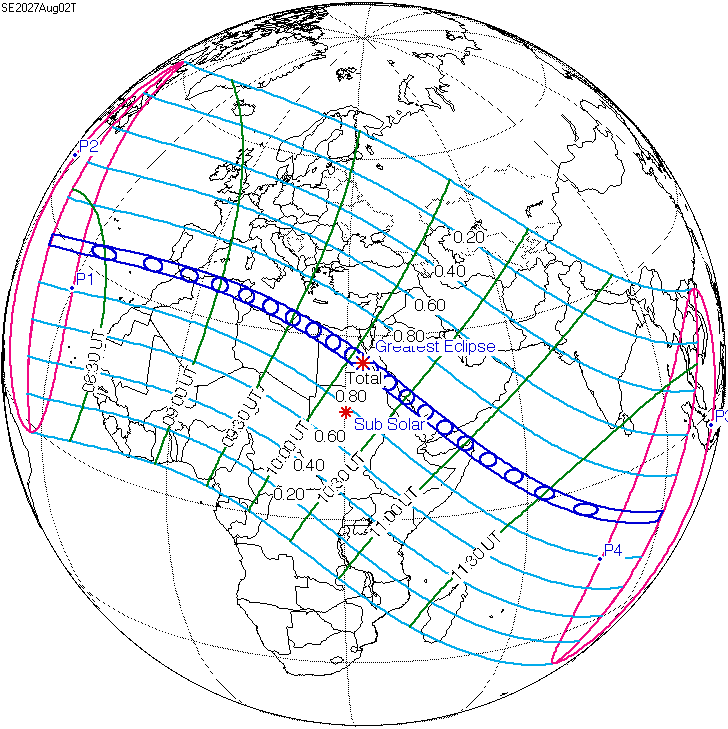
- Map
- Gamma: 0.1421
- Magnitude: 1.079

Maximum eclipse
- Duration: 383 s (6 min 23 s)
- Coordinates: 25.5°N 33.2°E
- Max. width of band: 258 km (160 mi)

Times (UTC)
- Greatest eclipse: 10:07:50

References
- Saros: 136 (38 of 71)
- Catalog # (SE5000): 9568

A total solar eclipse, nicknamed the Eclipse of the Century, will occur at the Moon's descending node of orbit on Monday, August 2, 2027, with a magnitude of 1.079. A solar eclipse occurs when the Moon passes between Earth and the Sun, thereby totally or partly obscuring the image of the Sun for a viewer on Earth. A total solar eclipse occurs when the Moon's apparent diameter is larger than the Sun's, blocking all direct sunlight, turning day into darkness. Totality occurs in a narrow path across Earth's surface, with the partial solar eclipse visible over a surrounding region thousands of kilometres wide. Occurring about 2.5 hours before perigee (on August 2, 2027, at 7:25 UTC), the Moon's apparent diameter will be larger.

== Path ==
Path of Solar eclipse of August 2, 2027

Totality will commence over the eastern Atlantic Ocean and travel across the Strait of Gibraltar between Spain and Morocco, and continue across parts of North Africa and the Middle East. Major cities and locations under the path of totality will include:

- Cádiz, Ceuta, Málaga, and the coast of Granada and Almería, Spain
- Gibraltar
- Tangier, Morocco
- Oran, Algeria
- Sfax, Tunisia
- Benghazi, Libya
- Luxor in southern Egypt
- Jeddah and Mecca in southwest Saudi Arabia
- Sana'a in western Yemen
- The tip of the Horn of Africa in extreme northeast Somalia
- Islands in the British Indian Ocean Territory

The maximum duration of totality will be observed in Egypt, approximately 60 km (37 miles) southeast of Luxor, and will last 6 minutes and 22 seconds.

A partial solar eclipse will be visible from the extreme east tip of Maine, United States, far eastern Quebec and the Atlantic Provinces in Canada, southern Greenland, Iceland, Ireland, Great Britain, nearly the entirety of the European continent, all but the southern quarter of Africa, the Middle East, and from South and Southeast Asia.

It will be the first of three total solar eclipses that are observable in Tunisia in the 21st century, passing over the central part of the country. It will be the second total eclipse in Spain within a year, after August 2026. An annular eclipse will appear in Spain in January 2028. A national eclipse committee has been established in Spain to coordinate eclipse-related activities.

== Duration ==
This is the second longest total solar eclipse in the 21st century, the longest being the eclipse prior to this one in Solar Saros 136, that of July 22, 2009. The 2009 eclipse maximum duration of six minutes and 39.5 seconds occurred over the Pacific Ocean, and the longest duration on land was on remote, uninhabited North Iwo Jima, where visiting is not allowed without special permission. The maximum duration of this eclipse is six minutes and 23.2 seconds, occurring in the northeastern part of Egypt's New Valley Governorate. The location of the greatest eclipse is about 250 kilometres (160 mi) southeast in Red Sea Governorate, with a slightly shorter duration. This is the longest total solar eclipse on easily accessible land in the 21st century; a longer one will not occur until June 3, 2114.

== Images ==
Animated path

== Eclipse timing ==
=== Places experiencing total eclipse ===
Solar eclipse of August 2, 2027 (local times)
Country or territory	City or place	Start of partial eclipse	Start of total eclipse	Maximum eclipse	End of total eclipse	End of partial eclipse	Duration of totality (min:s)	Duration of eclipse (hr:min)	Maximum magnitude
Spain	Cádiz	09:40:48	10:45:29	10:46:57	10:48:25	11:59:43	2:56	2:19	1.0076
Morocco	Tangier	08:40:39	09:44:47	09:47:12	09:49:38	11:00:32	4:51	2:20	1.0339
Spain	Ceuta	09:41:03	10:45:26	10:47:50	10:50:15	12:01:22	4:49	2:20	1.0304
Gibraltar	Gibraltar	09:41:10	10:45:39	10:47:53	10:50:07	12:01:18	4:28	2:20	1.0218
Spain	Marbella	09:41:42	10:46:53	10:48:33	10:50:14	12:02:02	3:21	2:20	1.0099
Spain	Málaga	09:42:09	10:48:12	10:49:10	10:50:09	12:02:46	1:57	2:21	1.0031
Spain	Melilla	09:42:27	10:48:19	10:50:36	10:52:53	12:05:31	4:34	2:23	1.0216
Morocco	Oujda	08:43:01	09:51:15	09:51:49	09:52:22	11:07:28	1:07	2:24	1.0014
Algeria	Oran	08:44:30	09:51:10	09:53:44	09:56:18	11:09:33	5:08	2:25	1.0365
Algeria	M'sila	08:48:59	09:58:09	10:00:50	10:03:32	11:18:50	5:23	2:30	1.0337
Tunisia	Kasserine	08:54:08	10:05:34	10:08:18	10:11:02	11:27:47	5:28	2:34	1.0286
Tunisia	Gafsa	08:53:56	10:05:49	10:08:23	10:10:58	11:28:18	5:09	2:34	1.0226
Tunisia	Kairouan	08:55:50	10:08:57	10:10:20	10:11:42	11:29:48	2:45	2:34	1.0049
Tunisia	Gabès	08:55:32	10:08:47	10:10:51	10:12:55	11:31:22	4:08	2:36	1.0121
Tunisia	Sfax	08:56:29	10:08:54	10:11:44	10:14:35	11:31:56	5:41	2:35	1.0323
Tunisia	Mahdia	08:57:02	10:10:38	10:12:02	10:13:27	11:31:49	2:49	2:35	1.005
Tunisia	Houmt Souk	08:56:32	10:09:52	10:12:13	10:14:35	11:32:55	4:43	2:36	1.0165
Tunisia	Zarzis	08:56:51	10:11:21	10:12:49	10:14:17	11:33:46	2:56	2:37	1.0057
Libya	Benghazi	10:10:46	11:27:58	11:31:03	11:34:09	12:53:26	6:11	2:43	1.0385
Egypt	Siwa Oasis	11:22:18	12:42:42	12:45:28	12:48:15	14:08:17	5:33	2:46	1.0206
Egypt	Minya	11:33:43	12:55:36	12:57:44	12:59:51	14:19:10	4:15	2:45	1.010
Egypt	Asyut	11:35:37	12:57:03	13:00:06	13:03:10	14:21:41	6:07	2:46	1.028
Egypt	Sohag	11:37:14	12:58:46	13:01:58	13:05:09	14:23:29	6:23	2:46	1.037
Egypt	Nag Hammadi	11:39:03	13:00:46	13:03:58	13:07:10	14:25:20	6:24	2:46	1.038
Egypt	Qena	11:39:52	13:01:34	13:04:41	13:07:46	14:25:50	6:12	2:46	1.030
Egypt	Luxor	11:40:21	13:02:14	13:05:26	13:08:36	14:26:44	6:22	2:46	1.0361
Egypt	Edfu	11:41:37	13:04:08	13:06:55	13:09:41	14:28:14	5:33	2:47	1.020
Saudi Arabia	Jeddah	12:00:23	13:22:21	13:25:18	13:28:14	14:43:47	5:53	2:43	1.0262
Saudi Arabia	Mecca	12:01:58	13:24:06	13:26:41	13:29:16	14:44:49	5:10	2:43	1.0176
Saudi Arabia	Taif	12:03:36	13:26:59	13:28:01	13:29:03	14:45:43	2:04	2:42	1.0023
Saudi Arabia	Khamis Mushait	12:13:38	13:34:41	13:37:41	13:40:41	14:54:05	6:00	2:40	1.0333
Yemen	Sanaa	12:22:05	13:44:15	13:45:35	13:46:54	15:00:50	2:39	2:39	1.0046
Somalia	Bosaso	12:39:49	13:58:18	14:00:22	14:02:26	15:12:09	4:08	2:32	1.013

=== Places experiencing partial eclipse ===
Solar eclipse of August 2, 2027 (local times)
Country or territory	City or place	Start of partial eclipse	Maximum eclipse	End of partial eclipse	Duration of eclipse (hr:min)	Maximum coverage
Morocco	Casablanca	08:38:29	09:44:25	10:57:29	2:19	97.21%
Portugal	Lisbon	08:40:51	09:44:57	10:55:12	2:14	92.54%
Spain	Madrid	09:45:32	10:51:21	12:02:53	2:17	86.38%
Algeria	Algiers	08:48:23	09:59:05	11:15:48	2:27	99.83%
United Kingdom	London	09:03:40	10:00:15	10:59:38	1:56	41.92%
France	Paris	10:00:46	11:01:19	12:05:10	2:04	51.31%
Tunisia	Tunis	08:56:18	10:10:12	11:28:54	2:33	97.14%
Vatican City	Vatican City	10:02:14	11:12:50	12:26:55	2:25	74.57%
Italy	Rome	10:02:15	11:12:53	12:26:58	2:25	74.58%
Libya	Tripoli	09:59:46	11:16:57	12:38:36	2:39	100.00%
Malta	Valletta	10:01:49	11:17:58	12:37:54	2:36	97.31%
Bulgaria	Sofia	11:18:28	12:29:07	13:40:52	2:22	60.79%
Greece	Athens	11:16:52	12:33:02	13:50:12	2:33	78.30%
Cyprus	Nicosia	11:35:25	12:53:04	14:08:45	2:33	72.47%
Egypt	Cairo	11:33:15	12:56:00	14:16:24	2:43	94.79%
Lebanon	Beirut	11:40:20	12:58:32	14:14:00	2:34	72.69%
Syria	Damascus	11:42:17	13:00:30	14:15:45	2:33	72.27%
Israel	Tel Aviv	11:39:00	12:59:00	14:16:35	2:37	80.41%
Jordan	Amman	11:42:11	13:02:05	14:18:45	2:37	78.39%
Saudi Arabia	Medina	11:57:24	13:21:00	14:38:45	2:41	94.43%
Sudan	Khartoum	10:57:20	12:22:46	13:42:26	2:45	71.27%
Saudi Arabia	Riyadh	12:13:49	13:32:45	14:45:10	2:31	75.94%
Eritrea	Asmara	12:11:01	13:36:19	14:54:05	2:43	87.69%
Djibouti	Djibouti	12:27:22	13:50:37	15:05:23	2:38	87.49%
Yemen	Aden	12:28:40	13:51:32	15:05:50	2:37	96.26%
Somalia	Berbera	12:33:24	13:55:40	15:09:14	2:36	89.11%
Somalia	Garowe	12:44:04	14:04:17	15:15:39	2:32	92.38%
Maldives	Malé	15:29:54	16:32:47	17:29:28	2:00	72.85%
Maldives	Addu City	15:33:59	16:37:58	17:35:30	2:02	89.97%
British Indian Ocean Territory	Diego Garcia	16:40:07	17:43:43	18:40:59	2:01	96.56%

== Eclipse details ==
Shown below are two tables displaying details about this particular solar eclipse. The first table outlines times at which the Moon's penumbra or umbra attains the specific parameter, and the second table describes various other parameters pertaining to this eclipse.

August 2, 2027 solar eclipse times
Event	Time (UTC)
First penumbral external contact	2027 August 2 at 07:31:21.9 UTC
First umbral external contact	2027 August 2 at 08:24:37.8 UTC
First central line	2027 August 2 at 08:26:14.5 UTC
First umbral internal contact	2027 August 2 at 08:27:51.1 UTC
First penumbral internal contact	2027 August 2 at 09:22:00.9 UTC
Greatest duration	2027 August 2 at 10:01:33.8 UTC
Equatorial conjunction	2027 August 2 at 10:02:10.7 UTC
Ecliptic conjunction	2027 August 2 at 10:06:23.6 UTC
Greatest eclipse	2027 August 2 at 10:07:50.2 UTC
Last penumbral internal contact	2027 August 2 at 10:53:47.0 UTC
Last umbral internal contact	2027 August 2 at 11:47:53.1 UTC
Last central line	2027 August 2 at 11:49:29.5 UTC
Last umbral external contact	2027 August 2 at 11:51:05.9 UTC
Last penumbral external contact	2027 August 2 at 12:44:21.3 UTC

August 2, 2027 solar eclipse parameters
Parameter	Value
Eclipse magnitude	1.07903
Eclipse obscuration	1.16430
Gamma	0.14209
Sun right ascension	08h49m26.9s
Sun declination	+17°45'41.3"
Sun semi-diameter	15'45.5"
Sun equatorial horizontal parallax	08.7"
Moon right ascension	08h49m40.1s
Moon declination	+17°53'47.8"
Moon semi-diameter	16'43.1"
Moon equatorial horizontal parallax	1°01'21.4"
ΔT	72.8 s

== Characteristics ==
=== Bright stars and planets visible during totality ===
The eclipsed Sun will be in mid-Cancer, a few degrees southeast of the Beehive Cluster (which will not be visible to the naked eye) and Venus (which will most definitely be seen if the sky is at all transparent). Mercury will be well past greatest western elongation and nearing superior conjunction (therefore showing most of its sunlit side to bright effect – magnitude −1.2) several degrees west of Venus. Jupiter will be near Regulus about 20 degrees east of the Sun. Mars will be many degrees farther east in Virgo. Saturn will be many degrees west of the Sun. Over most of the continental areas in the path of totality, the Winter Hexagon will be visible, although on the Arabian Peninsula its westernmost stars – Aldebaran and Rigel – will be low. In the British Indian Ocean Territory the Winter Hexagon stars will either have disappeared below the western horizon or will be very low, but Alpha Centauri, Beta Centauri and the Southern Cross will be well up in the south.

=== Eclipse path intersections ===
The path of the August 2, 2027, eclipse will be crossed by the path of another solar eclipse less than 7 years later, on March 20, 2034, at a location on the southeastern coast of Egypt. This is similar to the intersection in the paths of the August 2017 and April 2024 total solar eclipses in the United States, over southern Illinois, and in Turkey during the August 1999 and March 2006 solar eclipses; the intersections within these pairs of total eclipses also occurred about 7 years apart. This phenomenon is considered to be unusual, since the average interval for any given spot on Earth to observe a total solar eclipse is about once every 375 years. The intersection patterns are caused by the dynamics of the Saros cycle.

== Impact ==
=== Economy and tourism ===
The August 2027 total solar eclipse is expected to draw large numbers of tourists and become the most photographed astronomical event in history. In December 2025, about a year and a half before the eclipse, regions in southern Spain and Morocco were already reporting early hotel sell-outs, and travel operators predicted a multi-million-euro surge in tourism. An estimated 89 million people live in the path of totality, at least double the 44 million people who lived within the path of totality of the April 2024 solar eclipse in North America. One source estimated that over 200 million people could attempt to watch the August 2027 solar eclipse.

== Eclipse season ==
This eclipse is part of an eclipse season, a period, roughly every six months, when eclipses occur. Only two (or occasionally three) eclipse seasons occur each year, and each season lasts about 35 days and repeats just short of six months (173 days) later; thus two full eclipse seasons always occur each year. Either two or three eclipses happen each eclipse season. In the sequence below, each eclipse is separated by a fortnight. The first and last eclipse in this sequence is separated by one synodic month.

Eclipse season of July–August 2027
July 18 Ascending node (full moon)	August 2 Descending node (new moon)	August 17 Ascending node (full moon)
Penumbral lunar eclipse Lunar Saros 110	Total solar eclipse Solar Saros 136	Penumbral lunar eclipse Lunar Saros 148

== Related eclipses ==
=== Eclipses in 2027 ===
- An annular solar eclipse on February 6
- A penumbral lunar eclipse on February 20
- A penumbral lunar eclipse on July 18
- A total solar eclipse on August 2
- A penumbral lunar eclipse on August 17

=== Metonic ===
- Preceded by: Solar eclipse of October 14, 2023
- Followed by: Solar eclipse of May 21, 2031

=== Tzolkinex ===
- Preceded by: Solar eclipse of June 21, 2020
- Followed by: Solar eclipse of September 12, 2034

=== Half-Saros ===
- Preceded by: Lunar eclipse of July 27, 2018
- Followed by: Lunar eclipse of August 7, 2036

=== Tritos ===
- Preceded by: Solar eclipse of September 1, 2016
- Followed by: Solar eclipse of July 2, 2038

=== Solar Saros 136 ===
- Preceded by: Solar eclipse of July 22, 2009
- Followed by: Solar eclipse of August 12, 2045

=== Inex ===
- Preceded by: Solar eclipse of August 22, 1998
- Followed by: Solar eclipse of July 12, 2056

=== Triad ===
- Preceded by: Solar eclipse of October 1, 1940
- Followed by: Solar eclipse of June 3, 2114

=== Solar eclipses of 2026–2029 ===
This eclipse is a member of a semester series. An eclipse in a semester series of solar eclipses repeats approximately every 177 days and 4 hours (a semester) at alternating nodes of the Moon's orbit.

The partial solar eclipses on June 12, 2029 and December 5, 2029 occur in the next lunar year eclipse set.

Solar eclipse series sets from 2026 to 2029
Ascending node			Descending node		
Saros	Map	Gamma	Saros	Map	Gamma
121	February 17, 2026 Annular	−0.97427	126 León, Spain	August 12, 2026 Total	0.89774
131	February 6, 2027 Annular	−0.29515	136	August 2, 2027 Total	0.14209
141	January 26, 2028 Annular	0.39014	146	July 22, 2028 Total	−0.60557
151	January 14, 2029 Partial	1.05532	156	July 11, 2029 Partial	−1.41908

=== Saros 136 ===
This eclipse is a part of Saros series 136, repeating every 18 years, 11 days, and containing 71 events. The series started with a partial solar eclipse on June 14, 1360. It contains annular eclipses from September 8, 1504 through November 12, 1594; hybrid eclipses from November 22, 1612 through January 17, 1703; and total eclipses from January 27, 1721 through May 13, 2496. The series ends at member 71 as a partial eclipse on July 30, 2622. Its eclipses are tabulated in three columns; every third eclipse in the same column is one exeligmos apart, so they all cast shadows over approximately the same parts of the Earth.

The longest duration of annularity was produced by member 9 at 32 seconds on September 8, 1504, and the longest duration of totality was produced by member 34 at 7 minutes, 7.74 seconds on June 20, 1955. All eclipses in this series occur at the Moon’s descending node of orbit.

Series members 26–47 occur between 1801 and 2200:
26	27	28
March 24, 1811	April 3, 1829	April 15, 1847
29	30	31
April 25, 1865	May 6, 1883	May 18, 1901
32	33	34
May 29, 1919	June 8, 1937	June 20, 1955
35	36	37
June 30, 1973	July 11, 1991	July 22, 2009
38	39	40
August 2, 2027	August 12, 2045	August 24, 2063
41	42	43
September 3, 2081	September 14, 2099	September 26, 2117
44	45	46
October 7, 2135	October 17, 2153	October 29, 2171
47
November 8, 2189

=== Metonic series ===
The metonic series repeats eclipses every 19 years (6939.69 days), lasting about 5 cycles. Eclipses occur in nearly the same calendar date. In addition, the octon subseries repeats 1/5 of that or every 3.8 years (1387.94 days). All eclipses in this table occur at the Moon's descending node.

21 eclipse events between May 21, 1993 and May 20, 2069
May 20–21	March 9	December 25–26	October 13–14	August 1–2
118	120	122	124	126
May 21, 1993	March 9, 1997	December 25, 2000	October 14, 2004	August 1, 2008
128	130	132	134	136
May 20, 2012	March 9, 2016	December 26, 2019	October 14, 2023	August 2, 2027
138	140	142	144	146
May 21, 2031	March 9, 2035	December 26, 2038	October 14, 2042	August 2, 2046
148	150	152	154	156
May 20, 2050	March 9, 2054	December 26, 2057	October 13, 2061	August 2, 2065
158
May 20, 2069

=== Tritos series ===
This eclipse is a part of a tritos cycle, repeating at alternating nodes every 135 synodic months (≈ 3986.63 days, or 11 years minus 1 month). Their appearance and longitude are irregular due to a lack of synchronization with the anomalistic month (period of perigee), but groupings of 3 tritos cycles (≈ 33 years minus 3 months) come close (≈ 434.044 anomalistic months), so eclipses are similar in these groupings.

Series members between 1801 and 2200
April 14, 1809 (Saros 116)	March 14, 1820 (Saros 117)	February 12, 1831 (Saros 118)	January 11, 1842 (Saros 119)	December 11, 1852 (Saros 120)
November 11, 1863 (Saros 121)	October 10, 1874 (Saros 122)	September 8, 1885 (Saros 123)	August 9, 1896 (Saros 124)	July 10, 1907 (Saros 125)
June 8, 1918 (Saros 126)	May 9, 1929 (Saros 127)	April 7, 1940 (Saros 128)	March 7, 1951 (Saros 129)	February 5, 1962 (Saros 130)
January 4, 1973 (Saros 131)	December 4, 1983 (Saros 132)	November 3, 1994 (Saros 133)	October 3, 2005 (Saros 134)	September 1, 2016 (Saros 135)
August 2, 2027 (Saros 136)	July 2, 2038 (Saros 137)	May 31, 2049 (Saros 138)	April 30, 2060 (Saros 139)	March 31, 2071 (Saros 140)
February 27, 2082 (Saros 141)	January 27, 2093 (Saros 142)	December 29, 2103 (Saros 143)	November 27, 2114 (Saros 144)	October 26, 2125 (Saros 145)
September 26, 2136 (Saros 146)	August 26, 2147 (Saros 147)	July 25, 2158 (Saros 148)	June 25, 2169 (Saros 149)	May 24, 2180 (Saros 150)
April 23, 2191 (Saros 151)

=== Inex series ===
This eclipse is a part of the long period inex cycle, repeating at alternating nodes, every 358 synodic months (≈ 10,571.95 days, or 29 years minus 20 days). Their appearance and longitude are irregular due to a lack of synchronization with the anomalistic month (period of perigee). However, groupings of 3 inex cycles (≈ 87 years minus 2 months) comes close (≈ 1,151.02 anomalistic months), so eclipses are similar in these groupings.

Series members between 1801 and 2200
December 20, 1824 (Saros 129)	November 30, 1853 (Saros 130)	November 10, 1882 (Saros 131)
October 22, 1911 (Saros 132)	October 1, 1940 (Saros 133)	September 11, 1969 (Saros 134)
August 22, 1998 (Saros 135)	August 2, 2027 (Saros 136)	July 12, 2056 (Saros 137)
June 22, 2085 (Saros 138)	June 3, 2114 (Saros 139)	May 14, 2143 (Saros 140)
April 23, 2172 (Saros 141)		

== See also ==
- List of solar eclipses in the 21st century
- Solar eclipse of August 11, 1999
- Solar eclipse of July 22, 2009
- Solar eclipse of April 8, 2024
- Solar eclipse of July 22, 2028
- Solar eclipse of March 20, 2034
