= Solar eclipse of June 20, 1955 =

Total eclipse

- Total eclipse
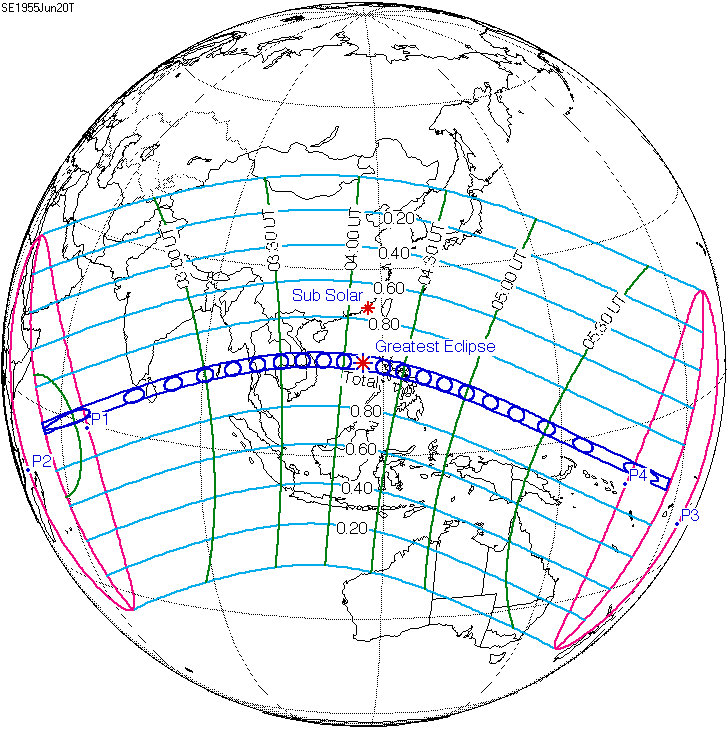
- Map
- Gamma: −0.1528
- Magnitude: 1.0776

Maximum eclipse
- Duration: 428 s (7 min 8 s)
- Coordinates: 14.8°N 117°E
- Max. width of band: 254 km (158 mi)

Times (UTC)
- Greatest eclipse: 4:10:42

References
- Saros: 136 (34 of 71)
- Catalog # (SE5000): 9410

A total solar eclipse occurred at the Moon's descending node of orbit on Monday, June 20, 1955, with a magnitude of 1.0776. A solar eclipse occurs when the Moon passes between Earth and the Sun, thereby totally or partly obscuring the image of the Sun for a viewer on Earth. A total solar eclipse occurs when the Moon's apparent diameter is larger than the Sun's, blocking all direct sunlight, turning day into darkness. Totality occurs in a narrow path across Earth's surface, with the partial solar eclipse visible over a surrounding region thousands of kilometres wide. Occurring about 14.5 hours after perigee (on June 19, 1955, at 14:40 UTC), the Moon's apparent diameter was larger.

With a maximum duration of 7 minutes 7.74 seconds, this is the longest solar eclipse of Saros series 136, as well as the longest total solar eclipse since the 11th century, and until the 22nd century, because greatest eclipse occurred near the equator.

Totality began over the Indian Ocean, British Seychelles (today's Seychelles) and Maldives, crossing Ceylon (name changed to Sri Lanka later) including the capital city Colombo, Andaman Islands, Burma (today's Myanmar), Thailand including the capital city Bangkok, Cambodia, Laos, South Vietnam (now belonging to Vietnam), Paracel Islands and Scarborough Shoal (near the greatest eclipse), moving across the Philippines including the capital city Manila, Kayangel Atoll in the Trust Territory of the Pacific Islands (now belonging to Palau), Nukumanu Islands in the Territory of Papua New Guinea (today's Papua New Guinea), towards northern Ontong Java Atoll in British Solomon Islands (today's Solomon Islands) ending over Southwestern Pacific Ocean. A partial eclipse was visible for parts of South Asia, Southeast Asia, East Asia, Australia, and Oceania.

This was the second of four central solar eclipses visible from Bangkok from 1948 to 1958, where it is extremely rare for a large city to witness four central solar eclipses within 10 years.

== Observations ==
The Tokyo Astronomical Observatory (now incorporated into the National Astronomical Observatory of Japan) of the University of Tokyo sent an expedition to Ceylon, but observation failed due to bad weather conditions. The Hydrographic Office of Japan (now Hydrographic and Oceanographic Department of Japan Coast Guard) sent a team to the western coast of Bình Thuận, Bình Sơn district, Quảng Ngãi province, South Vietnam. The whole process was not affected by any clouds or fog. The team said that totality of this eclipse was particularly dark compared with previous total solar eclipses observed, and the long duration of totality was also one of the reasons. The team took many images of solar corona successfully. A small team from the United States observed the total eclipse from Thailand. Some members of the Thai royal family also saw the eclipse from Phra Nakhon Si Ayutthaya province, north of the capital city Bangkok. In addition, Radio Thailand also broadcast a special program on the total solar eclipse nationally, which was the first such broadcast in Thailand.

== Eclipse details ==
Shown below are two tables displaying details about this particular solar eclipse. The first table outlines times at which the Moon's penumbra or umbra attains the specific parameter, and the second table describes various other parameters pertaining to this eclipse.

June 20, 1955 Solar Eclipse Times
Event	Time (UTC)
First Penumbral External Contact	1955 June 20 at 01:33:50.0 UTC
First Umbral External Contact	1955 June 20 at 02:27:20.5 UTC
First Central Line	1955 June 20 at 02:28:55.7 UTC
First Umbral Internal Contact	1955 June 20 at 02:30:30.9 UTC
First Penumbral Internal Contact	1955 June 20 at 03:25:02.8 UTC
Greatest Duration	1955 June 20 at 04:08:34.6 UTC
Greatest Eclipse	1955 June 20 at 04:10:42.0 UTC
Equatorial Conjunction	1955 June 20 at 04:12:01.6 UTC
Ecliptic Conjunction	1955 June 20 at 04:12:15.4 UTC
Last Penumbral Internal Contact	1955 June 20 at 04:56:19.0 UTC
Last Umbral Internal Contact	1955 June 20 at 05:50:53.2 UTC
Last Central Line	1955 June 20 at 05:52:27.7 UTC
Last Umbral External Contact	1955 June 20 at 05:54:02.2 UTC
Last Penumbral External Contact	1955 June 20 at 06:47:35.0 UTC

June 20, 1955 Solar Eclipse Parameters
Parameter	Value
Eclipse Magnitude	1.07756
Eclipse Obscuration	1.16113
Gamma	−0.15278
Sun Right Ascension	05h51m36.9s
Sun Declination	+23°25'50.7"
Sun Semi-Diameter	15'44.3"
Sun Equatorial Horizontal Parallax	08.7"
Moon Right Ascension	05h51m33.5s
Moon Declination	+23°16'33.0"
Moon Semi-Diameter	16'40.5"
Moon Equatorial Horizontal Parallax	1°01'11.8"
ΔT	31.2 s

== Eclipse season ==
This eclipse is part of an eclipse season, a period, roughly every six months, when eclipses occur. Only two (or occasionally three) eclipse seasons occur each year, and each season lasts about 35 days and repeats just short of six months (173 days) later; thus two full eclipse seasons always occur each year. Either two or three eclipses happen each eclipse season. In the sequence below, each eclipse is separated by a fortnight.

Eclipse season of June 1955
June 5 Ascending node (full moon)	June 20 Descending node (new moon)
Penumbral lunar eclipse Lunar Saros 110	Total solar eclipse Solar Saros 136

== Related eclipses ==
=== Eclipses in 1955 ===
- A penumbral lunar eclipse on January 8.
- A penumbral lunar eclipse on June 5.
- A total solar eclipse on June 20.
- A partial lunar eclipse on November 29.
- An annular solar eclipse on December 14.

=== Metonic ===
- Preceded by: Solar eclipse of September 1, 1951
- Followed by: Solar eclipse of April 8, 1959

=== Tzolkinex ===
- Preceded by: Solar eclipse of May 9, 1948
- Followed by: Solar eclipse of July 31, 1962

=== Half-Saros ===
- Preceded by: Lunar eclipse of June 14, 1946
- Followed by: Lunar eclipse of June 25, 1964

=== Tritos ===
- Preceded by: Solar eclipse of July 20, 1944
- Followed by: Solar eclipse of May 20, 1966

=== Solar Saros 136 ===
- Preceded by: Solar eclipse of June 8, 1937
- Followed by: Solar eclipse of June 30, 1973

=== Inex ===
- Preceded by: Solar eclipse of July 9, 1926
- Followed by: Solar eclipse of May 30, 1984

=== Triad ===
- Preceded by: Solar eclipse of August 18, 1868
- Followed by: Solar eclipse of April 20, 2042

=== Solar eclipses of 1953–1956 ===
This eclipse is a member of a semester series. An eclipse in a semester series of solar eclipses repeats approximately every 177 days and 4 hours (a semester) at alternating nodes of the Moon's orbit.

The partial solar eclipses on February 14, 1953 and August 9, 1953 occur in the previous lunar year eclipse set.

Solar eclipse series sets from 1953 to 1956
Descending node			Ascending node		
Saros	Map	Gamma	Saros	Map	Gamma
116	July 11, 1953 Partial	1.4388	121	January 5, 1954 Annular	−0.9296
126	June 30, 1954 Total	0.6135	131	December 25, 1954 Annular	−0.2576
136	June 20, 1955 Total	−0.1528	141	December 14, 1955 Annular	0.4266
146	June 8, 1956 Total	−0.8934	151	December 2, 1956 Partial	1.0923

=== Saros 136 ===
This eclipse is a part of Saros series 136, repeating every 18 years, 11 days, and containing 71 events. The series started with a partial solar eclipse on June 14, 1360. It contains annular eclipses from September 8, 1504 through November 12, 1594; hybrid eclipses from November 22, 1612 through January 17, 1703; and total eclipses from January 27, 1721 through May 13, 2496. The series ends at member 71 as a partial eclipse on July 30, 2622. Its eclipses are tabulated in three columns; every third eclipse in the same column is one exeligmos apart, so they all cast shadows over approximately the same parts of the Earth.

The longest duration of annularity was produced by member 9 at 32 seconds on September 8, 1504, and the longest duration of totality was produced by member 34 at 7 minutes, 7.74 seconds on June 20, 1955. All eclipses in this series occur at the Moon’s descending node of orbit.

Series members 26–47 occur between 1801 and 2200:
26	27	28
March 24, 1811	April 3, 1829	April 15, 1847
29	30	31
April 25, 1865	May 6, 1883	May 18, 1901
32	33	34
May 29, 1919	June 8, 1937	June 20, 1955
35	36	37
June 30, 1973	July 11, 1991	July 22, 2009
38	39	40
August 2, 2027	August 12, 2045	August 24, 2063
41	42	43
September 3, 2081	September 14, 2099	September 26, 2117
44	45	46
October 7, 2135	October 17, 2153	October 29, 2171
47
November 8, 2189

=== Metonic series ===
The metonic series repeats eclipses every 19 years (6939.69 days), lasting about 5 cycles. Eclipses occur in nearly the same calendar date. In addition, the octon subseries repeats 1/5 of that or every 3.8 years (1387.94 days). All eclipses in this table occur at the Moon's descending node.

22 eclipse events between April 8, 1902 and August 31, 1989
April 7–8	January 24–25	November 12	August 31–September 1	June 19–20
108	110	112	114	116
April 8, 1902			August 31, 1913	June 19, 1917
118	120	122	124	126
April 8, 1921	January 24, 1925	November 12, 1928	August 31, 1932	June 19, 1936
128	130	132	134	136
April 7, 1940	January 25, 1944	November 12, 1947	September 1, 1951	June 20, 1955
138	140	142	144	146
April 8, 1959	January 25, 1963	November 12, 1966	August 31, 1970	June 20, 1974
148	150	152	154	
April 7, 1978	January 25, 1982	November 12, 1985	August 31, 1989	

=== Tritos series ===
This eclipse is a part of a tritos cycle, repeating at alternating nodes every 135 synodic months (≈ 3986.63 days, or 11 years minus 1 month). Their appearance and longitude are irregular due to a lack of synchronization with the anomalistic month (period of perigee), but groupings of 3 tritos cycles (≈ 33 years minus 3 months) come close (≈ 434.044 anomalistic months), so eclipses are similar in these groupings.

Series members between 1801 and 2200
August 28, 1802 (Saros 122)	July 27, 1813 (Saros 123)	June 26, 1824 (Saros 124)	May 27, 1835 (Saros 125)	April 25, 1846 (Saros 126)
March 25, 1857 (Saros 127)	February 23, 1868 (Saros 128)	January 22, 1879 (Saros 129)	December 22, 1889 (Saros 130)	November 22, 1900 (Saros 131)
October 22, 1911 (Saros 132)	September 21, 1922 (Saros 133)	August 21, 1933 (Saros 134)	July 20, 1944 (Saros 135)	June 20, 1955 (Saros 136)
May 20, 1966 (Saros 137)	April 18, 1977 (Saros 138)	March 18, 1988 (Saros 139)	February 16, 1999 (Saros 140)	January 15, 2010 (Saros 141)
December 14, 2020 (Saros 142)	November 14, 2031 (Saros 143)	October 14, 2042 (Saros 144)	September 12, 2053 (Saros 145)	August 12, 2064 (Saros 146)
July 13, 2075 (Saros 147)	June 11, 2086 (Saros 148)	May 11, 2097 (Saros 149)	April 11, 2108 (Saros 150)	March 11, 2119 (Saros 151)
February 8, 2130 (Saros 152)	January 8, 2141 (Saros 153)	December 8, 2151 (Saros 154)	November 7, 2162 (Saros 155)	October 7, 2173 (Saros 156)
September 4, 2184 (Saros 157)	August 5, 2195 (Saros 158)			

=== Inex series ===
This eclipse is a part of the long period inex cycle, repeating at alternating nodes, every 358 synodic months (≈ 10,571.95 days, or 29 years minus 20 days). Their appearance and longitude are irregular due to a lack of synchronization with the anomalistic month (period of perigee). However, groupings of 3 inex cycles (≈ 87 years minus 2 months) comes close (≈ 1,151.02 anomalistic months), so eclipses are similar in these groupings.

Series members between 1801 and 2200
September 28, 1810 (Saros 131)	September 7, 1839 (Saros 132)	August 18, 1868 (Saros 133)
July 29, 1897 (Saros 134)	July 9, 1926 (Saros 135)	June 20, 1955 (Saros 136)
May 30, 1984 (Saros 137)	May 10, 2013 (Saros 138)	April 20, 2042 (Saros 139)
March 31, 2071 (Saros 140)	March 10, 2100 (Saros 141)	February 18, 2129 (Saros 142)
January 30, 2158 (Saros 143)	January 9, 2187 (Saros 144)	
