= Solar eclipse of May 29, 1919 =

Total eclipse, which helped prove Einstein's theory of relativity

- Total eclipse
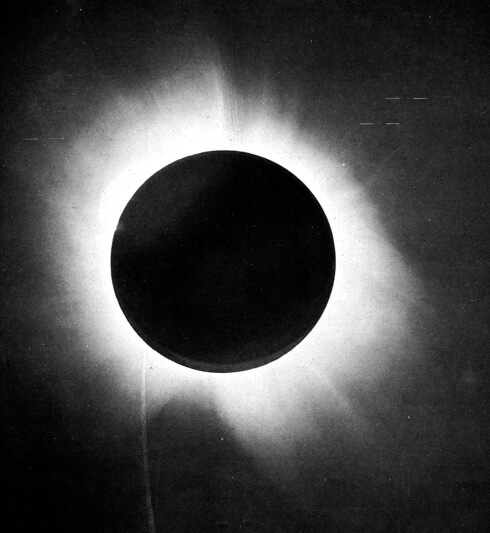
- From the report of Sir Arthur Eddington on the expedition to the island of Principe (off the west coast of Africa).

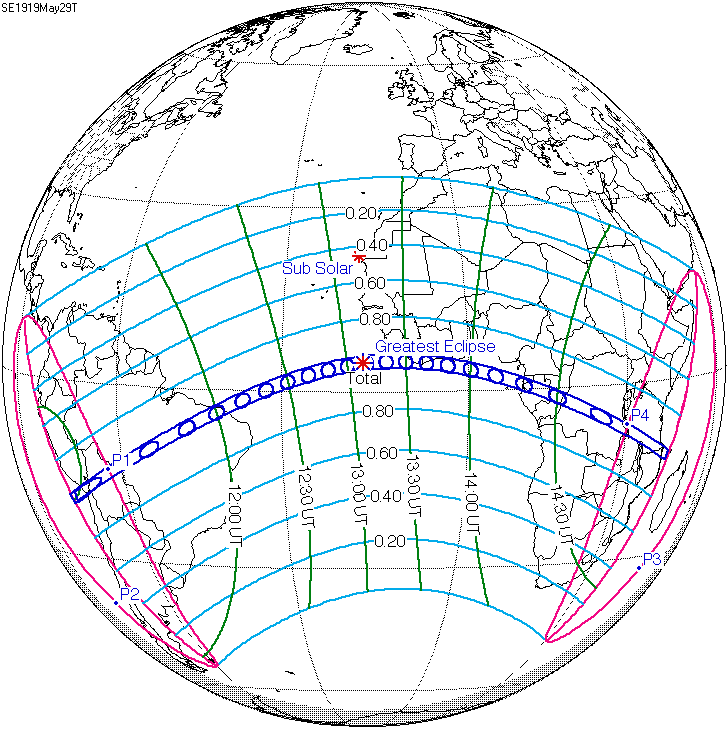
- Map
- Gamma: −0.2955
- Magnitude: 1.0719

Maximum eclipse
- Duration: 411 s (6 min 51 s)
- Coordinates: 4.4°N 16.7°W
- Max. width of band: 244 km (152 mi)

Times (UTC)
- Greatest eclipse: 13:08:55

References
- Saros: 136 (32 of 71)
- Catalog # (SE5000): 9326

A total solar eclipse occurred at the Moon's descending node of orbit on Thursday, May 29, 1919, with a magnitude of 1.0719. A solar eclipse occurs when the Moon passes between Earth and the Sun, thereby totally or partly obscuring the image of the Sun for a viewer on Earth. A total solar eclipse occurs when the Moon's apparent diameter is larger than the Sun's, blocking all direct sunlight, turning day into darkness. Totality occurs in a narrow path across Earth's surface, with the partial solar eclipse visible over a surrounding region thousands of kilometres wide. Occurring only 19 hours after perigee (on May 28, 1919, at 18:09 UTC), the Moon's apparent diameter was larger.

This specific total solar eclipse was significant because it helped prove Einstein's theory of relativity. The eclipse was the subject of the Eddington experiment: one group of British astronomers went to Brazil and one to the west coast of Africa to take pictures of the stars in the sky once the Moon covered the Sun and darkness was revealed. Those photos helped prove that the Sun interferes with the bend of starlight.

The totality of this eclipse was visible from southeastern Peru, northern Chile, much of Bolivia and central Brazil, southern Liberia, the southern Ivory Coast, Príncipe, Río Muni (now Equatorial Guinea), parts of central French Equatorial Africa (now Gabon and the Republic of the Congo), Belgian Congo (now the Democratic Republic of the Congo), northern Rhodesia (now northern Zambia), German East Africa (now Tanzania), northern Nyasaland (now Malawi), northern Mozambique, and the western Comoros. A partial eclipse was visible for most of South America and Africa.

== Observations and locations ==
A total solar eclipse occurred on Thursday, May 29, 1919. With the duration of totality at maximum eclipse of 6 minutes 50.75 seconds, it was the longest solar eclipse that occurred since May 27, 1416. A longer total solar eclipse would later occur on June 8, 1937.

It was visible throughout most of South America and Africa as a partial eclipse. Totality occurred through a narrow path across southeastern Peru, northern Chile, central Bolivia and Brazil after sunrise, across the Atlantic Ocean and into south central Africa, covering southern Liberia, southern French West Africa (the part now belonging to Ivory Coast), the extreme southwestern tip of the British Gold Coast (now Ghana), Príncipe Island in Portuguese São Tomé and Príncipe, southern Spanish Guinea (now Equatorial Guinea), French Equatorial Africa (the parts now belonging to Gabon and R. Congo, including Libreville), Belgian Congo (now DR Congo), northeastern Northern Rhodesia (now Zambia), the northern tip of Nyasaland (now Malawi), German East Africa (now belonging to Tanzania) and northeastern Portuguese Mozambique (now Mozambique), ending near sunset in eastern Africa.

=== Planets and stars visible during totality ===
The Sun was at about its nearest to Aldebaran, so that star was potentially visible throughout the eclipse path. Mars had its conjunction with the Sun twenty days earlier and shone at 2nd magnitude a few degrees to the west. Much brighter Mercury was several degrees farther west of the Sun than Mars. Those were the only two bright planets visible in Bolivia, where the eclipsed Sun was very low in the east. Deneb, Altair, Fomalhaut and Achernar were the only 1st-magnitude stars well clear of the horizon; Vega, Aldebaran, Rigel and Canopus were very low. Observers in western Africa had a much more impressive eclipse sky with the Winter Hexagon well up, along with Canopus. Venus and Jupiter were brilliant near Pollux and Saturn was close to the west of Regulus.

=== Connection to the general theory of relativity ===
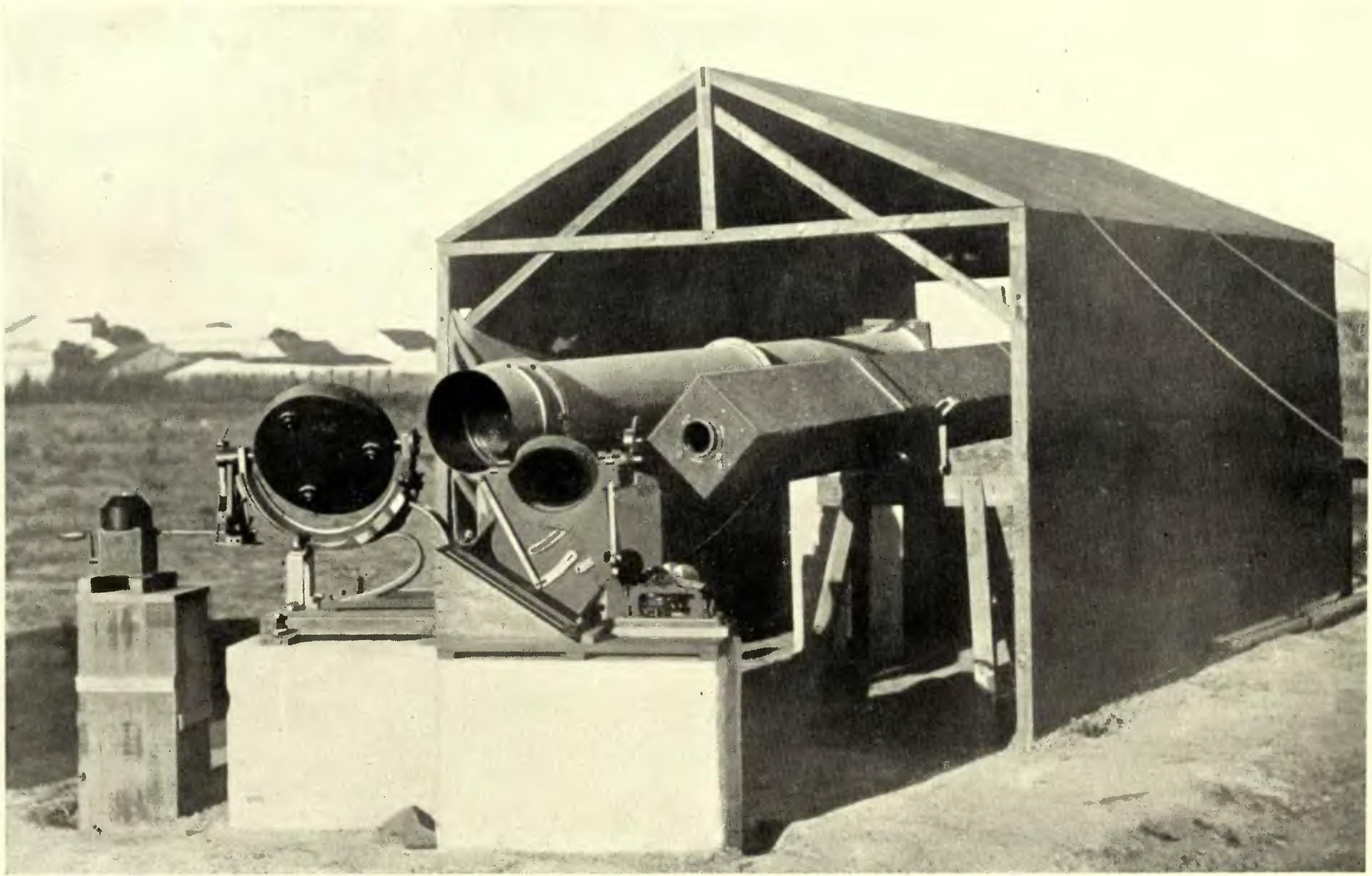
Eclipse instrument used at Sobral, Ceará

Newton's laws of physics ran on the belief of absolute time and three dimensions of space. This idea meant that time had only one dimension, and that it was universal. Einstein had the idea of combining space and time to make a four-dimensional world that worked together. Einstein's idea meant that extremely small matter particles could produce massive amounts of energy. If Einstein's theory was correct, matter and radiation would be connected to energy and momentum, meaning that when light was passing a large mass there would be an observable bend to the light.

Einstein's prediction of the bending of light by the gravity of the Sun, one of the components of his general theory of relativity, can be tested during a solar eclipse, when stars with apparent position near the Sun become visible. The stars cannot be seen without a solar eclipse because stars passing the sun are drowned by solar glares.

Following an unsuccessful attempt to validate this prediction during the Solar eclipse of June 8, 1918, two expeditions were made to measure positions of stars during this eclipse (see Eddington experiment). They were organized under the direction of Sir Dyson. One expedition was led by Sir Arthur Eddington to the island of Príncipe (off the west coast of Africa), the other by Andrew Claude de la Cherois Crommelin and Charles Rundle Davidson to Sobral in Brazil. The stars that both expeditions observed, the Hyades, were in the constellation Taurus.

The solar eclipse of May 29, 1919 allowed Einstein to finalize his theory of relativity. However, the May eclipse was almost missed, due to unexpected storms. The astronomers were almost unable to get photos of this eclipse due to a cloud. A thunderstorm happened during the morning of the eclipse, and it had been overcast that day and many of the days beforehand. Only thirty minutes before the eclipse did the clouds began to dissipate, and even then they were taking many photos through gaps in the clouds.

The photographs taken during the eclipse of May 29, 1919, proved Einstein correct and changed ideas of physics. They provided evidence that the Sun's mass did shift the way a star's light will bend. From the findings from these expeditions Dyson is quoted saying, "After a careful study of the plates, I am prepared to say that they confirm Einstein's prediction." He continued to explain that it left little doubt about light deflection in the area around the Sun and it was the amount Einstein demanded in his generalized theory of relativity.

== Eclipse details ==
Shown below are two tables displaying details about this particular solar eclipse. The first table outlines times at which the Moon's penumbra or umbra attains the specific parameter, and the second table describes various other parameters pertaining to this eclipse.

May 29, 1919 Solar Eclipse Times
Event	Time (UTC)
First Penumbral External Contact	1919 May 29 at 10:33:42.1 UTC
First Umbral External Contact	1919 May 29 at 11:28:47.1 UTC
First Central Line	1919 May 29 at 11:30:18.1 UTC
First Umbral Internal Contact	1919 May 29 at 11:31:49.2 UTC
First Penumbral Internal Contact	1919 May 29 at 12:31:38.1 UTC
Equatorial Conjunction	1919 May 29 at 13:06:48.8 UTC
Greatest Eclipse	1919 May 29 at 13:08:54.5 UTC
Greatest Duration	1919 May 29 at 13:09:53.0 UTC
Ecliptic Conjunction	1919 May 29 at 13:11:55.6 UTC
Last Penumbral Internal Contact	1919 May 29 at 13:46:13.7 UTC
Last Umbral Internal Contact	1919 May 29 at 14:46:02.6 UTC
Last Central Line	1919 May 29 at 14:47:32.7 UTC
Last Umbral External Contact	1919 May 29 at 14:49:02.7 UTC
Last Penumbral External Contact	1919 May 29 at 15:44:10.0 UTC

May 29, 1919 Solar Eclipse Parameters
Parameter	Value
Eclipse Magnitude	1.07186
Eclipse Obscuration	1.14889
Gamma	−0.29549
Sun Right Ascension	04h21m07.3s
Sun Declination	+21°30'15.9"
Sun Semi-Diameter	15'46.6"
Sun Equatorial Horizontal Parallax	08.7"
Moon Right Ascension	04h21m12.6s
Moon Declination	+21°12'18.4"
Moon Semi-Diameter	16'38.3"
Moon Equatorial Horizontal Parallax	1°01'03.7"
ΔT	21.0 s

== Eclipse season ==
This eclipse is part of an eclipse season, a period, roughly every six months, when eclipses occur. Only two (or occasionally three) eclipse seasons occur each year, and each season lasts about 35 days and repeats just short of six months (173 days) later; thus two full eclipse seasons always occur each year. Either two or three eclipses happen each eclipse season. In the sequence below, each eclipse is separated by a fortnight.

Eclipse season of May 1919
May 15 Ascending node (full moon)	May 29 Descending node (new moon)
Penumbral lunar eclipse Lunar Saros 110	Total solar eclipse Solar Saros 136

== Related eclipses ==
Total solar eclipse of May 29, 1919, as simulated by Celestia.

=== Earlier eclipses related to the Theory of Relativity ===
Before 1919 there were two eclipses in 1912 where this idea was almost proven, but there were outside factors against astronomers. The first eclipse in 1912 was on April 17, but superstition, underfunding, and time overwhelmed the astronomers on this date. The April 17 eclipse was nicknamed "The Titanic Eclipse", because it occurred two days after the sinking of the Titanic. There is a history of people connecting eclipses to "divine events", and due to the continued search and rescue of victims, people started to believe that the eclipse and wreck were connected. The surrounding superstition of the eclipse led to it being less a study on physics and more of a party. However, a lack of funding, preparation, and time of total coverage of the sun would have also caused issues for the astronomers. The second eclipse they wanted to photograph was on October 10, 1912, and it was unable to be photographed due to rain.

=== Eclipses in 1919 ===
- A penumbral lunar eclipse on May 15.
- A total solar eclipse on May 29.
- A partial lunar eclipse on November 7.
- An annular solar eclipse on November 22.

=== Metonic ===
- Preceded by: Solar eclipse of August 10, 1915
- Followed by: Solar eclipse of March 17, 1923

=== Tzolkinex ===
- Preceded by: Solar eclipse of April 17, 1912
- Followed by: Solar eclipse of July 9, 1926

=== Half-Saros ===
- Preceded by: Lunar eclipse of May 24, 1910
- Followed by: Lunar eclipse of June 3, 1928

=== Tritos ===
- Preceded by: Solar eclipse of June 28, 1908
- Followed by: Solar eclipse of April 28, 1930

=== Solar Saros 136 ===
- Preceded by: Solar eclipse of May 18, 1901
- Followed by: Solar eclipse of June 8, 1937

=== Inex ===
- Preceded by: Solar eclipse of June 17, 1890
- Followed by: Solar eclipse of May 9, 1948

=== Triad ===
- Preceded by: Solar eclipse of July 27, 1832
- Followed by: Solar eclipse of March 29, 2006

=== Solar eclipses of 1916–1920 ===
This eclipse is a member of a semester series. An eclipse in a semester series of solar eclipses repeats approximately every 177 days and 4 hours (a semester) at alternating nodes of the Moon's orbit.

The solar eclipses on February 3, 1916 (total), July 30, 1916 (annular), January 23, 1917 (partial), and July 19, 1917 (partial) occur in the previous lunar year eclipse set.

Solar eclipse series sets from 1916 to 1920
Ascending node			Descending node		
Saros	Map	Gamma	Saros	Map	Gamma
111	December 24, 1916 Partial	−1.5321	116	June 19, 1917 Partial	1.2857
121	December 14, 1917 Annular	−0.9157	126	June 8, 1918 Total	0.4658
131	December 3, 1918 Annular	−0.2387	136 Totality in Príncipe	May 29, 1919 Total	−0.2955
141	November 22, 1919 Annular	0.4549	146	May 18, 1920 Partial	−1.0239
151	November 10, 1920 Partial	1.1287			

=== Saros 136 ===
This eclipse is a part of Saros series 136, repeating every 18 years, 11 days, and containing 71 events. The series started with a partial solar eclipse on June 14, 1360. It contains annular eclipses from September 8, 1504 through November 12, 1594; hybrid eclipses from November 22, 1612 through January 17, 1703; and total eclipses from January 27, 1721 through May 13, 2496. The series ends at member 71 as a partial eclipse on July 30, 2622. Its eclipses are tabulated in three columns; every third eclipse in the same column is one exeligmos apart, so they all cast shadows over approximately the same parts of the Earth.

The longest duration of annularity was produced by member 9 at 32 seconds on September 8, 1504, and the longest duration of totality was produced by member 34 at 7 minutes, 7.74 seconds on June 20, 1955. All eclipses in this series occur at the Moon’s descending node of orbit.

Series members 26–47 occur between 1801 and 2200:
26	27	28
March 24, 1811	April 3, 1829	April 15, 1847
29	30	31
April 25, 1865	May 6, 1883	May 18, 1901
32	33	34
May 29, 1919	June 8, 1937	June 20, 1955
35	36	37
June 30, 1973	July 11, 1991	July 22, 2009
38	39	40
August 2, 2027	August 12, 2045	August 24, 2063
41	42	43
September 3, 2081	September 14, 2099	September 26, 2117
44	45	46
October 7, 2135	October 17, 2153	October 29, 2171
47
November 8, 2189

=== Metonic series ===
The metonic series repeats eclipses every 19 years (6939.69 days), lasting about 5 cycles. Eclipses occur in nearly the same calendar date. In addition, the octon subseries repeats 1/5 of that or every 3.8 years (1387.94 days). All eclipses in this table occur at the Moon's descending node.

22 eclipse events between March 16, 1866 and August 9, 1953
March 16–17	January 1–3	October 20–22	August 9–10	May 27–29
108	110	112	114	116
March 16, 1866			August 9, 1877	May 27, 1881
118	120	122	124	126
March 16, 1885	January 1, 1889	October 20, 1892	August 9, 1896	May 28, 1900
128	130	132	134	136
March 17, 1904	January 3, 1908	October 22, 1911	August 10, 1915	May 29, 1919
138	140	142	144	146
March 17, 1923	January 3, 1927	October 21, 1930	August 10, 1934	May 29, 1938
148	150	152	154	
March 16, 1942	January 3, 1946	October 21, 1949	August 9, 1953	

=== Tritos series ===
This eclipse is a part of a tritos cycle, repeating at alternating nodes every 135 synodic months (≈ 3986.63 days, or 11 years minus 1 month). Their appearance and longitude are irregular due to a lack of synchronization with the anomalistic month (period of perigee), but groupings of 3 tritos cycles (≈ 33 years minus 3 months) come close (≈ 434.044 anomalistic months), so eclipses are similar in these groupings.

Series members between 1801 and 2200
April 4, 1810 (Saros 126)	March 4, 1821 (Saros 127)	February 1, 1832 (Saros 128)	December 31, 1842 (Saros 129)	November 30, 1853 (Saros 130)
October 30, 1864 (Saros 131)	September 29, 1875 (Saros 132)	August 29, 1886 (Saros 133)	July 29, 1897 (Saros 134)	June 28, 1908 (Saros 135)
May 29, 1919 (Saros 136)	April 28, 1930 (Saros 137)	March 27, 1941 (Saros 138)	February 25, 1952 (Saros 139)	January 25, 1963 (Saros 140)
December 24, 1973 (Saros 141)	November 22, 1984 (Saros 142)	October 24, 1995 (Saros 143)	September 22, 2006 (Saros 144)	August 21, 2017 (Saros 145)
July 22, 2028 (Saros 146)	June 21, 2039 (Saros 147)	May 20, 2050 (Saros 148)	April 20, 2061 (Saros 149)	March 19, 2072 (Saros 150)
February 16, 2083 (Saros 151)	January 16, 2094 (Saros 152)	December 17, 2104 (Saros 153)	November 16, 2115 (Saros 154)	October 16, 2126 (Saros 155)
September 15, 2137 (Saros 156)	August 14, 2148 (Saros 157)	July 15, 2159 (Saros 158)	June 14, 2170 (Saros 159)	May 13, 2181 (Saros 160)
April 12, 2192 (Saros 161)

=== Inex series ===
This eclipse is a part of the long period inex cycle, repeating at alternating nodes, every 358 synodic months (≈ 10,571.95 days, or 29 years minus 20 days). Their appearance and longitude are irregular due to a lack of synchronization with the anomalistic month (period of perigee). However, groupings of 3 inex cycles (≈ 87 years minus 2 months) comes close (≈ 1,151.02 anomalistic months), so eclipses are similar in these groupings.

Series members between 1801 and 2200
August 17, 1803 (Saros 132)	July 27, 1832 (Saros 133)	July 8, 1861 (Saros 134)
June 17, 1890 (Saros 135)	May 29, 1919 (Saros 136)	May 9, 1948 (Saros 137)
April 18, 1977 (Saros 138)	March 29, 2006 (Saros 139)	March 9, 2035 (Saros 140)
February 17, 2064 (Saros 141)	January 27, 2093 (Saros 142)	January 8, 2122 (Saros 143)
December 19, 2150 (Saros 144)	November 28, 2179 (Saros 145)	
