= Milwaukee-Downer College =

Women's college in Milwaukee, Wisconsin, US

- Type: Women's College
- Active: 1895–1964
- Location: Milwaukee, Wisconsin, United States; 43°04′42″N 87°52′43″W

Milwaukee-Downer College was a women's college in Milwaukee, Wisconsin, in operation from 1895 until its merger with Lawrence University in 1964.

== History ==
Milwaukee-Downer College was established in 1895 with the merger of two institutions: Milwaukee College and Downer College of Fox Lake, Wisconsin.

In July 1895, Milwaukee College and Downer College merged to become Milwaukee-Downer College with Downer College's Ellen Clara Sabin as president. A new site was chosen on a tract of about ten acres on the northern end of the city of Milwaukee, halfway between Lake Michigan and the Milwaukee River. Two buildings (Merrill and Holton Halls) were constructed, and were first occupied in September, 1899, when Milwaukee-Downer opened in its new quarters. In 1901 a residence hall for students in the college department was completed. According to the report of the state superintendent of public instruction for 1906 the college had 356 students, 32 instructors, and owned property valued at $354,787.

In 1910, the Milwaukee-Downer Seminary high school was separated from the college (prior to that date it was the pre-collegiate section of the college), although a separate corporation was not obtained until 1933.

== Leadership ==
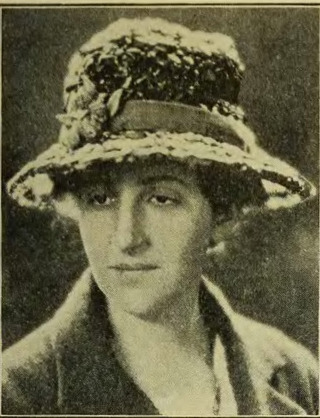
Lucia Russell Briggs

Three presidents led Milwaukee-Downer College from 1895 to 1964: Ellen Clara Sabin from 1895 to 1921, Lucia Russell Briggs from 1921 to 1951, and John B. Johnson from 1951 to 1964. Under Sabin's leadership, the college established a curriculum emphasizing the liberal arts and the cultivation of moral and religious values. Two of the college's long-lasting curricular specializations were home economics and occupational therapy. The program in home economics was established in 1901, and the occupational therapy program was one of the first in the country, established in 1918–1919. Enrollment peaked during Lucia Briggs' tenure at 444 students in the 1946-47 scholastic year. Briggs was succeeded by John B. Johnson, a political science professor with teaching and administrative experience at only one place, Park College in Parkville, Missouri, before coming to Milwaukee-Downer. Under Johnson, the number of men on the faculty increased in almost every year, and the residence halls were closed to women faculty. Johnson also initiated a policy of hiring part-time, ad hoc faculty to teach one or two courses. Through the 1950s and early 1960s, enrollment declined in almost every year, from 278 in 1951–52 to a low of 176 in 1962–63.

== Consolidation ==
In 1964, the college's trustees agreed to a consolidation with Lawrence College in Appleton, Wisconsin. The 43-acre (170,000 m^{2}) campus was sold to the University of Wisconsin–Milwaukee, and 49 female students and 21 faculty members transferred to Lawrence. Buildings and land from its former campus still form part of the present-day campus of the University of Wisconsin–Milwaukee. At Lawrence, some Milwaukee-Downer traditions have been adopted, such as the assignment of class colors.

== Notable people ==
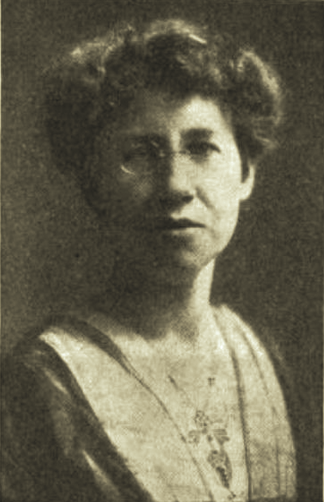
Mina Kerr, Dean of Women, Milwaukee-Downer College

- Elda Emma Anderson (1899–1961), professor of physics, health physics pioneer, isolated uranium-235 as part of Manhattan Project
- Helen Daniels Bader (1927–1978), alumna, philanthropist and businesswoman.
- Ethelwynn Rice Beckwith (1879–1955), taught mathematics and astronomy at Milwaukee-Downer from 1925 to 1947
- Olga Bellin (1929–1987), Polish-American actress, primarily in theater and TV, but best known for co-starring with Robert Duvall in the 1972 Faulkner adaptation, Tomorrow; graduated Phi Beta Kappa in 1951.
- Colleen Dewhurst (June 3, 1924 – August 22, 1991) was a Canadian-American actress mostly known for theatre roles. She attended the school for two years but did not graduate.
- Emily Hale (1891–1969), speech and drama teacher long associated with T. S. Eliot
- Ellen Torelle Nagler (1870–1965), American biologist, author, lecturer
- Emily Parker Groom (1876–1975), faculty member, creator of art department in 1902, American artist
- Liz Richardson (1918–1945), Red Cross volunteer and clubmobiler in WW2
- Margaret S. Rood (1908–1984), chair of occupational therapy program at the University of Southern California
- Louise Adelaide Wolf (1898–1962), American mathematician and university professor.
