= Ethelwynn Rice Beckwith =

American economist

- Ethelwynn Rice Beckwith, from a 1930 yearbook
- Born: Mary Ethelwynn Rice; January 7, 1879; Hartford, Connecticut
- Died: August 31, 1955 (aged 76); Manitowoc, Wisconsin
- Occupations: Educator, economist

Mary Ethelwynn Rice Beckwith (January 7, 1879 – August 31, 1955) was an American mathematics educator. She held a PhD in economics from Radcliffe College, and taught for over forty years, at the Emma Willard School, Western Reserve University, Vassar College, and Milwaukee-Downer College.

== Early life and education ==
Mary Ethelwynn Rice was born in Hartford, Connecticut, the daughter of William Holden Price and Elizabeth P. Kinney Rice. Her father was an ordained minister, and she spent some of her girlhood in Hawaii, where she was valedictorian in the Punahou School class of 1896.

Rice graduated from Oberlin College in 1900, and earned a master's degree at Western Reserve University in 1909. She pursued graduate studies at Vassar College and the University of Göttingen, and completed a doctorate in economics at Radcliffe College in 1925, with a dissertation titled "Inequalities in the Distribution of Income, their Meaning and Measurement." She was treasurer of the Radcliffe Graduate Club.

== Career ==
Beckwith was a widow in her mid-twenties when she taught mathematics at the Emma Willard School in New York from 1905 to 1907. She taught mathematics at Western Reserve University from 1913 to 1920, and at Vassar College from 1921 to 1925. She was professor of mathematics and astronomy and head of the mathematics department at Milwaukee-Downer College in Wisconsin from 1925 to 1947. She was an active member of the Mathematical Association of America. She traveled to Trujillo, Peru in 1936 to witness a total solar eclipse, and wrote about the trip and the event for the Oberlin Alumnae Magazine, quipping that "no subject under the sun is more worthy of study than the sun itself".

== Personal life ==
In 1900, Ethelwynn Rice married William Erastus Beckwith. They lived in Paia, Maui, where he died in 1904. She died from injuries sustained in a car accident in 1955, aged 77 years, in Manitowoc, Wisconsin.
