= Louise Adelaide Wolf =

American mathematician (1898–1962)

- Born: October 20, 1898; Milwaukee, Wisconsin
- Died: November 14, 1962 (aged 64); Milwaukee, Wisconsin
- Education: Milwaukee-Downer College; University of Wisconsin
- Occupations: Mathematician, professor

Louise Adelaide Wolf (October 20, 1898 in Milwaukee – November 14, 1962 in Milwaukee) was an American mathematician and university professor. She was one of the few women to earn a math PhD in the United States before World War II.

== Life and work ==
Wolf was the daughter of a German immigrant, Caroline Kupperian, and a Milwaukee-born streetcar conductor named John Theodore Wolf. Louise attended the 26th Avenue School and South Division High School in Milwaukee. From 1915 to 1916 she studied at Milwaukee-Downer College (now part of the University of Wisconsin).

Over the next 12 years, she accepted positions that included working in a dentist's office and a public library in Milwaukee, and teaching for two years in Nevada and another two years in a Florida school. In 1928 she returned to study mathematics in Milwaukee at the Extension Division of the University of Wisconsin. In October of her senior year, mathematician Warren Weaver wrote to Dean Sellery to request an assistantship for Louise Wolf. He noted that Miss Wolf was a senior mathematics major with a straight A record in math. He said he ordinarily would not appoint a senior student to such a position but "Miss Wolf is an exceedingly capable woman, over 30 years of age, who has had experience in teaching and whose university education has been delayed by the fact that she is helping educate a younger sister."

Wolf received her bachelor's degree in 1931 and her master's degree in 1933. She and her younger sister Margarete C. Wolf (Hopkins), born in November 1911, both remained at the University of Wisconsin and received their doctorates in 1935 as students of Mark Hoyt Ingraham. Louise's dissertation, entitled “Similarity of Matrices in Which the Elements are Real Quaternions,” was published in 1936 and subsequently was cited by other researchers.

She immediately took a one-year faculty position at the University of Wisconsin's Extension Division, which involved circuit teaching in several Wisconsin towns. At the beginning of World War II, she became a faculty member at the University of Wisconsin–Madison. There she was a lecturer from 1936 to 1938, an assistant professor until 1951, and then an associate professor until her retirement in 1961.

Louise A. Wolf was 64 when she died in Milwaukee in 1962.

== Memberships ==
According to Judy Green, Wolf belonged to several professional societies.

- Mathematical Association of America
- American Mathematical Society
- American Association for the Advancement of Science
- National Council of Teachers of Mathematics
- Phi Beta Kappa
- Sigma Xi

== Selected publications ==
- 1936: Similarity of matrices in which the elements are real quaternions. Bull. Amer. Math. Soc. 42
- 1938: with M. C. Wolf: The linear equation in matrices with elements in a division algebra. Bull. Amer. Math. Soc. 44
