= Margaret S. Rood =

American occupational therapist

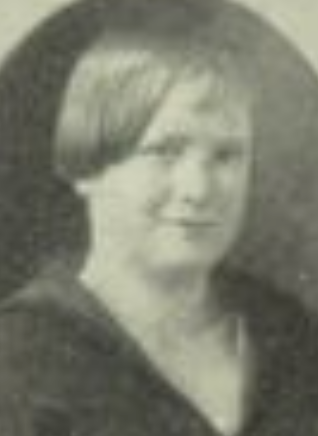
- Margaret S. Rood, from the 1925 yearbook of Rochester High School
- Born: November 6, 1908; Marinette, Wisconsin
- Died: September 11, 1984 (aged 75); Torrance, California
- Occupations: Occupational therapist, physical therapist, college professor

Margaret Sigrid Rood (November 6, 1908 – September 11, 1984) was an American occupational and physical therapist. She developed techniques for treating central nervous system dysfunction, now known as Rood techniques or Rood's approach.

== Early life and education ==
Rood was born in Marinette, Wisconsin, the daughter of Sophus Y. Rood and Maria Erickson Rood. Both of her parents were born in Norway. She graduated from Rochester High School, earned a bachelor's degree at Milwaukee-Downer College in 1932, and received a certificate in occupational therapy in 1933. Later in life, she earned a master's degree at Stanford University.

== Career ==
Rood worked as a therapist at a county hospital in Wauwatosa, Wisconsin from 1933 to 1936. She lived in Indianapolis from 1937 to 1943, when she was an occupational therapist in the Cerebral Palsy Clinic at James Whitcomb Riley Hospital, part of the Indiana University Medical Complex.

From 1943 to 1952 and from 1959 to 1966, Rood was organizer and chair of the occupational therapy department at the University of Southern California (USC). Under her leadership, USC began the first master's level program in occupational training in the United States. "The need for trained therapists to assist the war wounded in mental and physical rehabilitation is critical," she told The Los Angeles Times in 1944. From 1956 to 1957 she studied post-polio patients at Rancho Los Amigos Hospital. She retired in 1972.

Rood developed a sequence of techniques for the treatment of children and adults with central nervous system dysfunction, now known as Rood techniques or Rood's approach. She traveled nationally teaching these techniques. In 1958, she received the Eleanor Clarke Slagle Lectureship from the American Occupational Therapy Association. She was named the Sixth Mary McMillan Lecturer in 1969. "Despite some controversy about the efficacy of Rood's techniques," notes a 2021 textbook in the field, "current neuroscience research continues to support the importance of sensory stimulation."

== Publications ==
- "Project for Treatment of Cerebral Palsy" (1938)
- "A program for paraplegics" (1947)
- "Occupational Therapy in the Treatment of the Cerebral Palsied" (1952)
- "Neurophysiological Reactions as a Basis for Physical Therapy" (1954)

== Personal life and legacy ==
She died in 1984, in Torrance, California, at the age of 75. There is a small collection of her papers in the University Archives at USC. In 2017, Rood was recognised by the America Occupational Therapy Association as 1 of 100 people who influenced the 100 year history of occupational therapy.
