= Emily Parker Groom =

American artist

- Born: March 17, 1876; Wayland, Massachusetts
- Died: January 24, 1975 (aged 98); Milwaukee, Wisconsin
- Known for: Painting

Emily Parker Groom (1876–1975) was an American artist born in Wayland, Massachusetts. She remained an active painter until the age of 97, spending nearly her entire career in Wisconsin, and died in Milwaukee, Wisconsin.

== Early life and education ==
As a child, she attended weekly art lessons under Miss Alida Goodwin, a teacher at South Division High School and All Saints Cathedral Institute, where Emily later graduated. She simultaneously received private painting lessons from her father.

These experiences combined provided her with a unique early education compared to the primarily German-speaking community of artists in the area. She attended the Art Institute of Chicago with John Vanderpoel, the Boston Museum of Fine Arts under Edmund Tarbull, and participated in the Art Student's League in New York with Birge Harrison. Parker Groom also trained in London with Frank Brangwyn.

== Artistic career ==
Emily Parker Groom became a faculty member at Milwaukee Downer College organizing the art department as well as teaching undergrad, where she eventually created the art department in 1902. She also taught at the Layton School of Art in Milwaukee.

She took a break from teaching from 1917-1945, in order to focus on her painting. She built a studio named "Windover" in 1917 with her sister Mary Groom in Genesee, Wisconsin.

She participated in the Public Works Art Project, created by President Franklin Roosevelt in 1933, as a planner and an exhibiting artist.

During the Depression years, there was a lack of major exhibitions. She did not participate in many shows or sell many works of art during this time. During the Great Depression as well as her teaching term at the Layton School of Art, "she participated in 'Grab Bag' sales to raise money to assist Layton Students." ("Grab Bag" sales are described as selling small work for dollar after it had been displayed for a week in a specially organized exhibition, designated for these sales.)

In 1952, Parker Groom and Marian Bode co-founded the Wisconsin Watercolor Society, which was the first Wisconsin art organization to be devoted exclusively to watercolor painting.

She was also a member of the Wisconsin Painters and Sculptors as well as the American Watercolor Society, the Chicago Gallery Association, Artists’ Equity, National Association of Woman Painters and Sculptors, Concord Art Association and both the Philadelphia, and New York Watercolor Club.

Emily Parker Groom studied and visited museums and galleries while she traveled. She, in particular, was often fond of the Museum of Fine Arts in Boston.

=== Style ===
Early work of Emily Parker Groom reflected an English style, as opposed to the German academic influence common amongst other Wisconsin artists. Later Groom used an impressionistic style in artwork of urban and rural landscapes of Wisconsin.

She is noted to have worked in various mediums, and a retrospective hosted by the Charles Allis Art Museum contained thirty-four images in chalk, charcoal, graphite, pastel and watercolor and her subjects range from flowers to urban and rural landscapes as well as international landscapes. Her art is often marked by reflecting English artistic style.

She used the wet-on-wet technique "that retains a timeless, contemporary element."

She also found a way to incorporate the texture of the watercolor paper to make a stucco exterior for buildings in her work.

In the 1920s, Groom's work became more focused on watercolor and painting en plein air.

Emily Parker Groom enjoyed watercolor and enjoyed spending time in surroundings that could match the colors. In the summer of 1946 Groom went to Guatemala and was amazed by the colors around her "[Her] water colors of Guatemala are flooded with a warm wash of sunlight. Many of them glow with bougainvillea and other flowers in a country where every blossom is opulent and rich in size and color," wrote a newspaper reporter. She was also one of the founders of the New Watercolor Society of Wisconsin in 1952.

== Exhibitions and major works ==
In 1904 she entered a work at the Tenth Annual Exhibition of Art Students League of Chicago titled A Portrait of Mrs. Rollin B. Mallory.

The following is a list of Emily Parker Groom's solo exhibitions:

- F.H. Bressler Gallery (1917)
- Milwaukee Art Institute (1925)
- Thomas Dunbar Galleries (1926)
- Chicago Galleries Association (1929)
- Layton Art Gallery (1929, 1933, 1935, 1941)
- Milwaukee-Downer College (1936, 1947, 1955)
- Bressler Gallery (1937)
- Chapman Memorial Library (1938, 1943)
- Oshkosh Public Museum (1945)
- Paine Art Center (1958)
- Charles Allis Art Museum (1972)
- Lawerence University
- Wriston Art Center Galleries (2001)
- Charles Allis Art Museum (2002)
