= Solar eclipse of June 8, 1937 =

Total eclipse

- Total eclipse
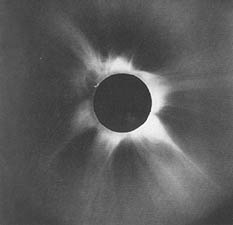
- The solar eclipse as viewed from Kanton Island.

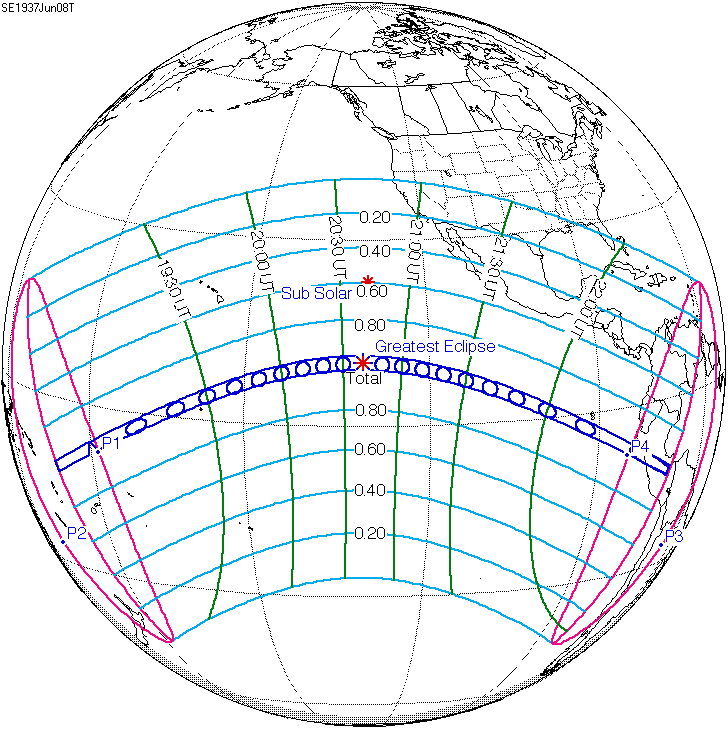
- Map
- Gamma: −0.2253
- Magnitude: 1.0751

Maximum eclipse
- Duration: 424 s (7 min 4 s)
- Coordinates: 9.9°N 130.5°W
- Max. width of band: 250 km (160 mi)

Times (UTC)
- Greatest eclipse: 20:41:02

References
- Saros: 136 (33 of 71)
- Catalog # (SE5000): 9369

A total solar eclipse occurred at the Moon's descending node of orbit between Tuesday, June 8 and Wednesday, June 9, 1937, with a magnitude of 1.0751. A solar eclipse occurs when the Moon passes between Earth and the Sun, thereby totally or partly obscuring the image of the Sun for a viewer on Earth. A total solar eclipse occurs when the Moon's apparent diameter is larger than the Sun's, blocking all direct sunlight, turning day into darkness. Totality occurs in a narrow path across Earth's surface, with the partial solar eclipse visible over a surrounding region thousands of kilometres wide. Occurring about 16 hours after perigee (on June 8, 1937, at 4:30 UTC), the Moon's apparent diameter was larger.

With a maximum eclipse of 7 minutes and 4.06 seconds, this was the longest total solar eclipse since July 1, 1098, which lasted 7 minutes and 5.34 seconds. A longer total solar eclipse occurred on June 20, 1955.

The path of totality crossed the Pacific Ocean starting in Gilbert and Ellice Islands (now belonging to Tuvalu and Kiribati) on June 9 (Wednesday), and ending at sunset in Peru on June 8 (Tuesday). At sunrise totality lasted 3 minutes, 6.8 seconds and at sunset totality lasted 3 minutes, 5.1 seconds. A partial eclipse was visible for parts of Oceania, Hawaii, southern North America, Central America, the Caribbean, and western South America. American astronomy professor Ethelwynn Rice Beckwith traveled to Peru to see this eclipse, and described the event in detail for the Oberlin Alumnae Magazine in 1937, in an article titled "Three Minutes in Peru."

== Observations ==
Scientists from the United States, United Kingdom and New Zealand observed the total eclipse in Canton Island, Phoenix Islands. The American expedition was organized by the National Geographic Society and assisted by the United States Navy. This total solar eclipse was memorable for three reasons: first, the duration of totality was particularly long with the longest point in eastern Pacific exceeding 7 minutes; second, despite being in the tropics, weather was good for all observation sites; third, broadcasts were made through radio before, during and after the eclipse through long distances so people could hear the details.

== Eclipse details ==
Shown below are two tables displaying details about this particular solar eclipse. The first table outlines times at which the Moon's penumbra or umbra attains the specific parameter, and the second table describes various other parameters pertaining to this eclipse.

June 8, 1937 Solar Eclipse Times
Event	Time (UTC)
First Penumbral External Contact	1937 June 8 at 18:04:51.1 UTC
First Umbral External Contact	1937 June 8 at 18:59:01.4 UTC
First Central Line	1937 June 8 at 19:00:34.9 UTC
First Umbral Internal Contact	1937 June 8 at 19:02:08.4 UTC
First Penumbral Internal Contact	1937 June 8 at 19:58:44.5 UTC
Greatest Duration	1937 June 8 at 20:40:34.6 UTC
Greatest Eclipse	1937 June 8 at 20:41:01.5 UTC
Equatorial Conjunction	1937 June 8 at 20:41:09.6 UTC
Ecliptic Conjunction	1937 June 8 at 20:43:19.5 UTC
Last Penumbral Internal Contact	1937 June 8 at 21:23:18.0 UTC
Last Umbral Internal Contact	1937 June 8 at 22:19:55.6 UTC
Last Central Line	1937 June 8 at 22:21:28.3 UTC
Last Umbral External Contact	1937 June 8 at 22:23:00.9 UTC
Last Penumbral External Contact	1937 June 8 at 23:17:13.7 UTC

June 8, 1937 Solar Eclipse Parameters
Parameter	Value
Eclipse Magnitude	1.07513
Eclipse Obscuration	1.15590
Gamma	−0.22532
Sun Right Ascension	05h06m06.4s
Sun Declination	+22°52'06.5"
Sun Semi-Diameter	15'45.2"
Sun Equatorial Horizontal Parallax	08.7"
Moon Right Ascension	05h06m06.1s
Moon Declination	+22°38'22.0"
Moon Semi-Diameter	16'39.4"
Moon Equatorial Horizontal Parallax	1°01'08.0"
ΔT	23.9 s

== Eclipse season ==
This eclipse is part of an eclipse season, a period, roughly every six months, when eclipses occur. Only two (or occasionally three) eclipse seasons occur each year, and each season lasts about 35 days and repeats just short of six months (173 days) later; thus two full eclipse seasons always occur each year. Either two or three eclipses happen each eclipse season. In the sequence below, each eclipse is separated by a fortnight.

Eclipse season of May–June 1937
May 25 Ascending node (full moon)	June 8 Descending node (new moon)
Penumbral lunar eclipse Lunar Saros 110	Total solar eclipse Solar Saros 136

== Related eclipses ==
=== Eclipses in 1937 ===
- A penumbral lunar eclipse on May 25.
- A total solar eclipse on June 8.
- A partial lunar eclipse on November 18.
- An annular solar eclipse on December 2.

=== Metonic ===
- Preceded by: Solar eclipse of August 21, 1933
- Followed by: Solar eclipse of March 27, 1941

=== Tzolkinex ===
- Preceded by: Solar eclipse of April 28, 1930
- Followed by: Solar eclipse of July 20, 1944

=== Half-Saros ===
- Preceded by: Lunar eclipse of June 3, 1928
- Followed by: Lunar eclipse of June 14, 1946

=== Tritos ===
- Preceded by: Solar eclipse of July 9, 1926
- Followed by: Solar eclipse of May 9, 1948

=== Solar Saros 136 ===
- Preceded by: Solar eclipse of May 29, 1919
- Followed by: Solar eclipse of June 20, 1955

=== Inex ===
- Preceded by: Solar eclipse of June 28, 1908
- Followed by: Solar eclipse of May 20, 1966

=== Triad ===
- Preceded by: Solar eclipse of August 7, 1850
- Followed by: Solar eclipse of April 8, 2024

=== Solar eclipses of 1935–1938 ===
This eclipse is a member of a semester series. An eclipse in a semester series of solar eclipses repeats approximately every 177 days and 4 hours (a semester) at alternating nodes of the Moon's orbit.

The partial solar eclipses on February 3, 1935 and July 30, 1935 occur in the previous lunar year eclipse set.

Solar eclipse series sets from 1935 to 1938
Ascending node			Descending node		
Saros	Map	Gamma	Saros	Map	Gamma
111	January 5, 1935 Partial	−1.5381	116	June 30, 1935 Partial	1.3623
121	December 25, 1935 Annular	−0.9228	126	June 19, 1936 Total	0.5389
131	December 13, 1936 Annular	−0.2493	136 Totality in Kanton Island, Kiribati	June 8, 1937 Total	−0.2253
141	December 2, 1937 Annular	0.4389	146	May 29, 1938 Total	−0.9607
151	November 21, 1938 Partial	1.1077			

=== Saros 136 ===
This eclipse is a part of Saros series 136, repeating every 18 years, 11 days, and containing 71 events. The series started with a partial solar eclipse on June 14, 1360. It contains annular eclipses from September 8, 1504 through November 12, 1594; hybrid eclipses from November 22, 1612 through January 17, 1703; and total eclipses from January 27, 1721 through May 13, 2496. The series ends at member 71 as a partial eclipse on July 30, 2622. Its eclipses are tabulated in three columns; every third eclipse in the same column is one exeligmos apart, so they all cast shadows over approximately the same parts of the Earth.

The longest duration of annularity was produced by member 9 at 32 seconds on September 8, 1504, and the longest duration of totality was produced by member 34 at 7 minutes, 7.74 seconds on June 20, 1955. All eclipses in this series occur at the Moon’s descending node of orbit.

Series members 26–47 occur between 1801 and 2200:
26	27	28
March 24, 1811	April 3, 1829	April 15, 1847
29	30	31
April 25, 1865	May 6, 1883	May 18, 1901
32	33	34
May 29, 1919	June 8, 1937	June 20, 1955
35	36	37
June 30, 1973	July 11, 1991	July 22, 2009
38	39	40
August 2, 2027	August 12, 2045	August 24, 2063
41	42	43
September 3, 2081	September 14, 2099	September 26, 2117
44	45	46
October 7, 2135	October 17, 2153	October 29, 2171
47
November 8, 2189

=== Metonic series ===
The metonic series repeats eclipses every 19 years (6939.69 days), lasting about 5 cycles. Eclipses occur in nearly the same calendar date. In addition, the octon subseries repeats 1/5 of that or every 3.8 years (1387.94 days). All eclipses in this table occur at the Moon's descending node.

22 eclipse events between March 27, 1884 and August 20, 1971
March 27–29	January 14	November 1–2	August 20–21	June 8
108	110	112	114	116
March 27, 1884			August 20, 1895	June 8, 1899
118	120	122	124	126
March 29, 1903	January 14, 1907	November 2, 1910	August 21, 1914	June 8, 1918
128	130	132	134	136
March 28, 1922	January 14, 1926	November 1, 1929	August 21, 1933	June 8, 1937
138	140	142	144	146
March 27, 1941	January 14, 1945	November 1, 1948	August 20, 1952	June 8, 1956
148	150	152	154	
March 27, 1960	January 14, 1964	November 2, 1967	August 20, 1971	

=== Tritos series ===
This eclipse is a part of a tritos cycle, repeating at alternating nodes every 135 synodic months (≈ 3986.63 days, or 11 years minus 1 month). Their appearance and longitude are irregular due to a lack of synchronization with the anomalistic month (period of perigee), but groupings of 3 tritos cycles (≈ 33 years minus 3 months) come close (≈ 434.044 anomalistic months), so eclipses are similar in these groupings.

Series members between 1801 and 2200
June 16, 1806 (Saros 124)	May 16, 1817 (Saros 125)	April 14, 1828 (Saros 126)	March 15, 1839 (Saros 127)	February 12, 1850 (Saros 128)
January 11, 1861 (Saros 129)	December 12, 1871 (Saros 130)	November 10, 1882 (Saros 131)	October 9, 1893 (Saros 132)	September 9, 1904 (Saros 133)
August 10, 1915 (Saros 134)	July 9, 1926 (Saros 135)	June 8, 1937 (Saros 136)	May 9, 1948 (Saros 137)	April 8, 1959 (Saros 138)
March 7, 1970 (Saros 139)	February 4, 1981 (Saros 140)	January 4, 1992 (Saros 141)	December 4, 2002 (Saros 142)	November 3, 2013 (Saros 143)
October 2, 2024 (Saros 144)	September 2, 2035 (Saros 145)	August 2, 2046 (Saros 146)	July 1, 2057 (Saros 147)	May 31, 2068 (Saros 148)
May 1, 2079 (Saros 149)	March 31, 2090 (Saros 150)	February 28, 2101 (Saros 151)	January 29, 2112 (Saros 152)	December 28, 2122 (Saros 153)
November 26, 2133 (Saros 154)	October 26, 2144 (Saros 155)	September 26, 2155 (Saros 156)	August 25, 2166 (Saros 157)	July 25, 2177 (Saros 158)
June 24, 2188 (Saros 159)	May 24, 2199 (Saros 160)			

=== Inex series ===
This eclipse is a part of the long period inex cycle, repeating at alternating nodes, every 358 synodic months (≈ 10,571.95 days, or 29 years minus 20 days). Their appearance and longitude are irregular due to a lack of synchronization with the anomalistic month (period of perigee). However, groupings of 3 inex cycles (≈ 87 years minus 2 months) comes close (≈ 1,151.02 anomalistic months), so eclipses are similar in these groupings.

Series members between 1801 and 2200
August 27, 1821 (Saros 132)	August 7, 1850 (Saros 133)	July 19, 1879 (Saros 134)
June 28, 1908 (Saros 135)	June 8, 1937 (Saros 136)	May 20, 1966 (Saros 137)
April 29, 1995 (Saros 138)	April 8, 2024 (Saros 139)	March 20, 2053 (Saros 140)
February 27, 2082 (Saros 141)	February 8, 2111 (Saros 142)	January 20, 2140 (Saros 143)
December 29, 2168 (Saros 144)	December 9, 2197 (Saros 145)	

== See also ==
- Kanton Island § Americans arrive - describing events where a Pacific island disputed between the UK and the US was used to view the eclipse
