= Liz Richardson =

Red Cross Clubmobiler (1918–1945)

Elizabeth Richardson
- Born: Elizabeth Ann Richardson; June 8, 1918; Akron, Ohio, United States
- Died: July 25, 1945 (aged 27); Rouen, France
- Cause of death: crashed in an L-4 Grasshopper
- Burial place: Normandy American Cemetery and Memorial grave A-21-5; 49.360278°N 0.857222°W
- Education: Mishawaka High School
- Alma mater: Milwaukee-Downer College
- Occupation: advertising
- Organization: American Red Cross
- Parent(s): Charles Richardson; Henrietta Mehlbach
- Awards: American Red Cross medal

Elizabeth Ann Richardson (8 June 1918 – 25 July 1945) was a volunteer for the American Red Cross during World War II known for being one of the four women buried at the Normandy American Cemetery and Memorial.

== Early life ==
Richardson was born in Akron, Ohio on June 8, 1918, to Charles Monroe Richardson and Henrietta M. Mehlbach and raised in Mishawaka, Indiana. She attended Milwaukee-Downer College in 1936 specializing in Art and English. After college, she worked at the Boston Store (Wisconsin-based department store) and Gimbels before gaining a position in the advertisement department at Schuster's. She joined the Red Cross in July 1944.

== World War II Red Cross Service ==
Richardson served in a Clubmobile serving coffee and doughnuts to US troops during the Allied Liberation of France in the Second World War. Richardson was promoted to the Captain of her unit. She was killed in a Piper Cub plane crash near Rouen when flying to Paris on July 25, 1945, and is now one of the four women to be buried in the Normandy American Cemetery and Memorial. The three other women honored with burials there, were Mary H. Bankston, Mary Jewel Barlow and Dolores Mercedes Browne, African American women who had served in the Army's unique 6888th Central Postal Directory Battalion and been killed in a Jeep accident.
