= Solar eclipse of August 12, 2045 =

Total eclipse over North America

- Total eclipse
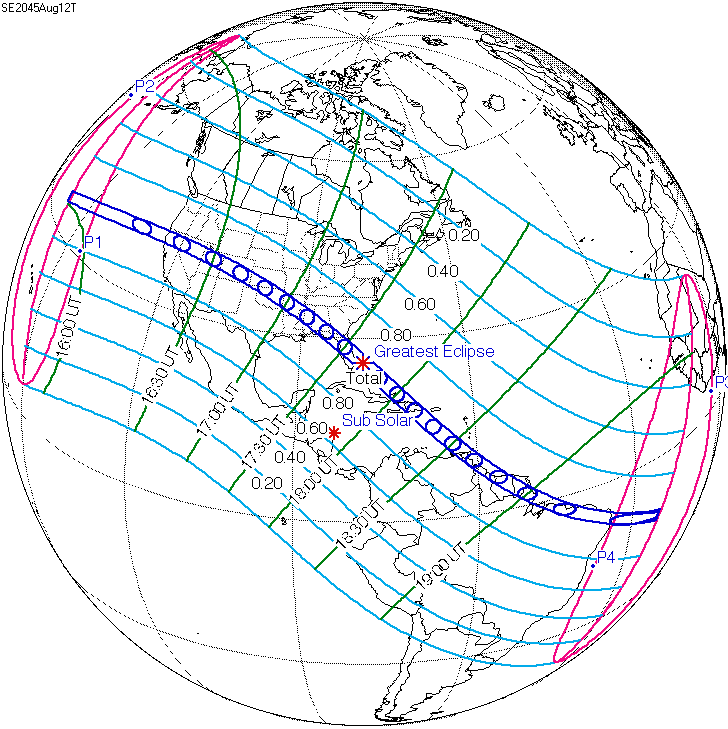
- Map
- Gamma: 0.2116
- Magnitude: 1.0774

Maximum eclipse
- Duration: 366 s (6 min 6 s)
- Coordinates: 25.9°N 78.5°W
- Max. width of band: 256 km (159 mi)

Times (UTC)
- Greatest eclipse: 17:42:39

References
- Saros: 136 (39 of 71)
- Catalog # (SE5000): 9608

A total solar eclipse will occur at the Moon's descending node of orbit on Saturday, August 12, 2045, with a magnitude of 1.0774. A solar eclipse occurs when the Moon passes between Earth and the Sun, thereby totally or partly obscuring the image of the Sun for a viewer on Earth. A total solar eclipse occurs when the Moon's apparent diameter is larger than the Sun's, blocking all direct sunlight, turning day into darkness. Totality occurs in a narrow path across Earth's surface, with the partial solar eclipse visible over a surrounding region thousands of kilometres wide. Occurring about 7 minutes after perigee (on August 12, 2045, at 17:35 UTC), the Moon's apparent diameter will be near its maximum.

It will be the fourth longest eclipse of the 21st century with a magnitude of 1.0774. It will be visible throughout much of the continental United States, with a path of totality running through northern California, Nevada, Utah, Colorado, Kansas, Oklahoma, Texas, Arkansas, northeastern Louisiana, Mississippi, Alabama, Georgia and Florida. The total eclipse will be greatest over the Bahamas, before continuing over the Turks and Caicos Islands, the Dominican Republic, Haiti, northeastern Venezuela, Trinidad and Tobago, Guyana, Suriname, French Guiana, and northeastern Brazil. A partial solar eclipse will also be visible for parts of the Russian Far East, Hawaii, North America, Central America, the Caribbean, northern and central South America, and West Africa.

The path of totality of this eclipse will be seen over many major cities, including Reno, Salt Lake City, Colorado Springs, Oklahoma City, Tulsa, Jackson, Montgomery, Tallahassee, Tampa, Orlando, Fort Lauderdale, Miami, Nassau, Santo Domingo, Porlamar, Port of Spain, Georgetown, Paramaribo, Belém, São Luís, Joāo Pessoa and Recife. Totality will last for at least 6 minutes along the part of the path that starts at Camden, Alabama, crossing Florida and ending near the southernmost Bahama Islands. The longest duration of totality will be 6 minutes 5.5 seconds at 25°54.594′N 78°32.19′W, which is over the Atlantic Ocean east of Fort Lauderdale and south of Freeport, Bahamas.

The solar eclipse of August 21, 2017 had a very similar path of totality over the U.S., about 250 miles (400 km) to the northeast, also crossing the Pacific coast and Atlantic coast of the country. This is because when a solar eclipse crosses the U.S. in mid-August at an ascending node (i.e. moves from south to north during odd-numbered saros), the path of the eclipse tracks from coast to coast. When a solar eclipse crosses the U.S. in mid-August at descending node (even numbered saros), the path tracks a large distance southward.

== Images ==
Animation of the eclipse shadow. The small dark circle represents the umbra, and the much larger grey circle represents the penumbra.

Another animation of the eclipse shadow.

== Eclipse timing ==
=== Places experiencing total eclipse ===
Solar Eclipse of August 12, 2045 (Local Times)
Country or territory	City or place	Start of partial eclipse	Start of total eclipse	Maximum eclipse	End of total eclipse	End of partial eclipse	Duration of totality (min:s)	Duration of eclipse (hr:min)	Maximum magnitude
United States	Salt Lake City	09:21:05	10:28:54	10:29:37	10:30:20	11:43:18	1:26	2:22	1.0019
United States	Oklahoma City	10:36:44	11:51:31	11:53:07	11:54:43	13:12:37	3:12	2:36	1.0068
United States	Little Rock	10:44:47	12:00:15	12:03:04	12:05:54	13:22:56	5:39	2:38	1.0284
United States	Jackson	10:49:40	12:08:04	12:09:39	12:11:14	13:30:23	3:10	2:41	1.0062
United States	Montgomery	10:56:21	12:14:56	12:16:51	12:18:45	13:36:50	3:49	2:40	1.009
United States	St. Petersburg	12:07:44	13:28:44	13:30:32	13:32:19	14:50:56	3:35	2:43	1.0076
United States	Tampa	12:07:55	13:28:09	13:30:38	13:33:07	14:50:57	4:58	2:43	1.0162
United States	Orlando	12:09:17	13:28:50	13:31:43	13:34:36	14:51:31	5:46	2:42	1.0261
United States	Hialeah	12:14:56	13:37:00	13:38:18	13:39:37	14:58:13	2:37	2:43	1.0041
United States	Miami	12:15:13	13:37:23	13:38:37	13:39:51	14:58:30	2:28	2:43	1.0036
Bahamas	Freeport	12:17:08	13:37:13	13:40:05	13:42:56	14:59:17	5:43	2:42	1.0256
Bahamas	Nassau	12:21:55	13:42:07	13:45:09	13:48:10	15:03:59	6:03	2:42	1.0343
Turks and Caicos Islands	Providenciales	12:37:33	13:58:42	14:00:12	14:01:42	15:16:49	3:00	2:39	1.0055
Haiti	Gonaïves	12:40:44	14:02:07	14:03:55	14:05:43	15:20:44	3:36	2:40	1.0082
Haiti	Labadee	12:41:01	14:01:13	14:04:01	14:06:49	15:20:38	5:36	2:40	1.026
Haiti	Cap-Haïtien	12:41:08	14:01:19	14:04:08	14:06:57	15:20:44	5:38	2:40	1.0264
Dominican Republic	Puerto Plata	12:44:09	14:04:07	14:06:34	14:09:00	15:22:23	4:53	2:38	1.0172
Dominican Republic	Santiago de los Caballeros	12:44:44	14:04:26	14:07:12	14:09:58	15:23:01	5:32	2:38	1.0254
Dominican Republic	La Vega	12:45:31	14:05:08	14:07:56	14:10:44	15:23:40	5:36	2:38	1.027
Dominican Republic	Santo Domingo	12:48:05	14:07:28	14:10:21	14:13:13	15:25:44	5:45	2:38	1.0312
Trinidad and Tobago	Port of Spain	13:18:58	14:34:26	14:36:54	14:39:21	15:46:50	4:55	2:28	1.0236
Trinidad and Tobago	Chaguanas	13:19:24	14:34:46	14:37:15	14:39:44	15:47:07	4:58	2:28	1.0246
Trinidad and Tobago	San Fernando	13:19:44	14:34:59	14:37:36	14:40:12	15:47:28	5:13	2:28	1.0312
Guyana	Georgetown	13:31:45	14:44:47	14:47:16	14:49:44	15:54:48	4:57	2:23	1.0306
Guyana	Linden	13:33:01	14:46:46	14:48:25	14:50:03	15:55:50	3:17	2:23	1.0093
Guyana	New Amsterdam	13:33:48	14:46:24	14:48:51	14:51:17	15:55:58	4:53	2:22	1.0299
Suriname	Nieuw Nickerie	14:35:11	15:47:25	15:49:53	15:52:20	16:56:40	4:55	2:21	1.0331
Suriname	Paramaribo	14:38:16	15:50:32	15:51:53	15:53:14	16:57:43	2:42	2:19	1.0064
Brazil	Belém	14:58:45	16:06:28	16:07:14	16:08:01	17:08:39	1:33	2:10	1.0027
Brazil	Recife	15:18:31	16:17:53	16:19:15	16:20:37	17:14:27	2:44	1:56	1.0119

=== Places experiencing partial eclipse ===
Solar Eclipse of August 12, 2045 (Local Times)
Country or territory	City or place	Start of partial eclipse	Maximum eclipse	End of partial eclipse	Duration of eclipse (hr:min)	Maximum coverage
United States	San Francisco	08:12:36	09:17:04	10:27:39	2:15	94.68%
United States	Los Angeles	08:14:55	09:21:07	10:33:45	2:19	79.46%
United States	Washington, D.C.	12:10:55	13:23:51	14:35:01	2:24	62.01%
United States	New York City	12:16:51	13:26:00	14:33:15	2:16	50.85%
Cuba	Havana	12:15:13	13:39:04	14:59:32	2:44	88.04%
Jamaica	Kingston	11:35:35	12:59:30	14:17:34	2:42	86.81%
Turks and Caicos Islands	Cockburn Harbour	12:39:31	14:01:56	15:18:11	2:39	99.87%
Turks and Caicos Islands	Cockburn Town	12:40:23	14:02:39	15:18:40	2:38	99.32%
Haiti	Port-au-Prince	12:43:06	14:06:15	15:22:49	2:40	99.78%
Puerto Rico	Cabo Rojo	12:54:42	14:15:39	15:29:26	2:34	98.74%
Puerto Rico	San Juan	12:55:55	14:16:12	15:29:21	2:33	94.78%
United States Virgin Islands	Charlotte Amalie	12:58:36	14:18:10	15:30:32	2:32	91.97%
United States Virgin Islands	Cruz Bay	12:58:54	14:18:23	15:30:40	2:32	91.62%
British Virgin Islands	Road Town	12:59:07	14:18:27	15:30:37	2:32	90.88%
United States Virgin Islands	Christiansted	13:00:05	14:19:37	15:31:52	2:32	92.99%
Aruba	Oranjestad	12:59:46	14:21:34	15:35:49	2:36	89.76%
Saint Kitts and Nevis	Basseterre	13:04:56	14:23:13	15:34:10	2:29	88.89%
Curaçao	Willemstad	13:02:39	14:24:02	15:37:46	2:35	91.66%
Antigua and Barbuda	St. John's	13:07:02	14:24:43	15:35:04	2:28	87.01%
Caribbean Netherlands	Kralendijk	13:03:44	14:24:57	15:38:26	2:35	93.62%
Guadeloupe	Basse-Terre	13:09:07	14:26:56	15:37:18	2:28	89.85%
Dominica	Roseau	13:10:58	14:28:41	15:38:50	2:28	90.88%
Venezuela	Caracas	13:09:42	14:30:01	15:42:27	2:33	92.71%
Martinique	Fort-de-France	13:12:46	14:30:21	15:40:18	2:28	91.98%
Saint Lucia	Castries	13:13:57	14:31:32	15:41:26	2:27	93.42%
Saint Vincent and the Grenadines	Kingstown	13:14:58	14:32:47	15:42:49	2:28	96.33%
Grenada	St. George's	13:15:57	14:34:06	15:44:22	2:28	99.87%
Barbados	Bridgetown	13:18:09	14:34:52	15:43:52	2:26	92.36%
Trinidad and Tobago	Scarborough	13:19:24	14:36:55	15:46:30	2:27	99.77%
French Guiana	Cayenne	14:44:02	15:55:48	17:00:01	2:16	97.78%
Brazil	Fortaleza	15:11:34	16:14:33	17:11:30	2:00	97.97%

== Eclipse details ==
Shown below are two tables displaying details about this particular solar eclipse. The first table outlines times at which the Moon's penumbra or umbra attains the specific parameter, and the second table describes various other parameters pertaining to this eclipse.

August 12, 2045 Solar Eclipse Times
Event	Time (UTC)
First Penumbral External Contact	2045 August 12 at 15:07:00.8 UTC
First Umbral External Contact	2045 August 12 at 16:00:47.6 UTC
First Central Line	2045 August 12 at 16:02:23.2 UTC
First Umbral Internal Contact	2045 August 12 at 16:03:58.9 UTC
First Penumbral Internal Contact	2045 August 12 at 16:59:52.7 UTC
Equatorial Conjunction	2045 August 12 at 17:32:55.3 UTC
Greatest Duration	2045 August 12 at 17:36:50.7 UTC
Ecliptic Conjunction	2045 August 12 at 17:40:30.1 UTC
Greatest Eclipse	2045 August 12 at 17:42:39.1 UTC
Last Penumbral Internal Contact	2045 August 12 at 18:25:38.4 UTC
Last Umbral Internal Contact	2045 August 12 at 19:21:25.5 UTC
Last Central Line	2045 August 12 at 19:23:01.0 UTC
Last Umbral External Contact	2045 August 12 at 19:24:36.5 UTC
Last Penumbral External Contact	2045 August 12 at 20:18:21.5 UTC

August 12, 2045 Solar Eclipse Parameters
Parameter	Value
Eclipse Magnitude	1.07736
Eclipse Obscuration	1.16069
Gamma	0.21161
Sun Right Ascension	09h31m17.7s
Sun Declination	+14°40'40.5"
Sun Semi-Diameter	15'47.0"
Sun Equatorial Horizontal Parallax	08.7"
Moon Right Ascension	09h31m39.7s
Moon Declination	+14°52'29.9"
Moon Semi-Diameter	16'43.3"
Moon Equatorial Horizontal Parallax	1°01'22.3"
ΔT	81.6 s

== Eclipse season ==
This eclipse is part of an eclipse season, a period, roughly every six months, when eclipses occur. Only two (or occasionally three) eclipse seasons occur each year, and each season lasts about 35 days and repeats just short of six months (173 days) later; thus two full eclipse seasons always occur each year. Either two or three eclipses happen each eclipse season. In the sequence below, each eclipse is separated by a fortnight.

Eclipse season of August 2045
August 12 Descending node (new moon)	August 27 Ascending node (full moon)
Total solar eclipse Solar Saros 136	Penumbral lunar eclipse Lunar Saros 148

== Related eclipses ==
=== Eclipses in 2045 ===
- An annular solar eclipse on February 16.
- A penumbral lunar eclipse on March 3.
- A total solar eclipse on August 12.
- A penumbral lunar eclipse on August 27.

=== Metonic ===
- Preceded by: Solar eclipse of October 25, 2041
- Followed by: Solar eclipse of May 31, 2049

=== Tzolkinex ===
- Preceded by: Solar eclipse of July 2, 2038
- Followed by: Solar eclipse of September 22, 2052

=== Half-Saros ===
- Preceded by: Lunar eclipse of August 7, 2036
- Followed by: Lunar eclipse of August 18, 2054

=== Tritos ===
- Preceded by: Solar eclipse of September 12, 2034
- Followed by: Solar eclipse of July 12, 2056

=== Solar Saros 136 ===
- Preceded by: Solar eclipse of August 2, 2027
- Followed by: Solar eclipse of August 24, 2063

=== Inex ===
- Preceded by: Solar eclipse of September 1, 2016
- Followed by: Solar eclipse of July 24, 2074

=== Triad ===
- Preceded by: Solar eclipse of October 12, 1958
- Followed by: Solar eclipse of June 13, 2132

=== Solar eclipses of 2044–2047 ===
This eclipse is a member of a semester series. An eclipse in a semester series of solar eclipses repeats approximately every 177 days and 4 hours (a semester) at alternating nodes of the Moon's orbit.

The partial solar eclipses on June 23, 2047 and December 16, 2047 occur in the next lunar year eclipse set.

Solar eclipse series sets from 2044 to 2047
Ascending node			Descending node		
Saros	Map	Gamma	Saros	Map	Gamma
121	February 28, 2044 Annular	−0.9954	126	August 23, 2044 Total	0.9613
131	February 16, 2045 Annular	−0.3125	136	August 12, 2045 Total	0.2116
141	February 5, 2046 Annular	0.3765	146	August 2, 2046 Total	−0.535
151	January 26, 2047 Partial	1.045	156	July 22, 2047 Partial	−1.3477

=== Saros 136 ===
This eclipse is a part of Saros series 136, repeating every 18 years, 11 days, and containing 71 events. The series started with a partial solar eclipse on June 14, 1360. It contains annular eclipses from September 8, 1504 through November 12, 1594; hybrid eclipses from November 22, 1612 through January 17, 1703; and total eclipses from January 27, 1721 through May 13, 2496. The series ends at member 71 as a partial eclipse on July 30, 2622. Its eclipses are tabulated in three columns; every third eclipse in the same column is one exeligmos apart, so they all cast shadows over approximately the same parts of the Earth.

The longest duration of annularity was produced by member 9 at 32 seconds on September 8, 1504, and the longest duration of totality was produced by member 34 at 7 minutes, 7.74 seconds on June 20, 1955. All eclipses in this series occur at the Moon’s descending node of orbit.

Series members 26–47 occur between 1801 and 2200:
26	27	28
March 24, 1811	April 3, 1829	April 15, 1847
29	30	31
April 25, 1865	May 6, 1883	May 18, 1901
32	33	34
May 29, 1919	June 8, 1937	June 20, 1955
35	36	37
June 30, 1973	July 11, 1991	July 22, 2009
38	39	40
August 2, 2027	August 12, 2045	August 24, 2063
41	42	43
September 3, 2081	September 14, 2099	September 26, 2117
44	45	46
October 7, 2135	October 17, 2153	October 29, 2171
47
November 8, 2189

=== Metonic series ===
The metonic series repeats eclipses every 19 years (6939.69 days), lasting about 5 cycles. Eclipses occur in nearly the same calendar date. In addition, the octon subseries repeats 1/5 of that or every 3.8 years (1387.94 days). All eclipses in this table occur at the Moon's descending node.

22 eclipse events between June 1, 2011 and October 24, 2098
May 31–June 1	March 19–20	January 5–6	October 24–25	August 12–13
118	120	122	124	126
June 1, 2011	March 20, 2015	January 6, 2019	October 25, 2022	August 12, 2026
128	130	132	134	136
June 1, 2030	March 20, 2034	January 5, 2038	October 25, 2041	August 12, 2045
138	140	142	144	146
May 31, 2049	March 20, 2053	January 5, 2057	October 24, 2060	August 12, 2064
148	150	152	154	156
May 31, 2068	March 19, 2072	January 6, 2076	October 24, 2079	August 13, 2083
158	160	162	164	
June 1, 2087			October 24, 2098	

=== Tritos series ===
This eclipse is a part of a tritos cycle, repeating at alternating nodes every 135 synodic months (≈ 3986.63 days, or 11 years minus 1 month). Their appearance and longitude are irregular due to a lack of synchronization with the anomalistic month (period of perigee), but groupings of 3 tritos cycles (≈ 33 years minus 3 months) come close (≈ 434.044 anomalistic months), so eclipses are similar in these groupings.

Series members between 1801 and 2200
June 26, 1805 (Saros 114)	May 27, 1816 (Saros 115)	April 26, 1827 (Saros 116)	March 25, 1838 (Saros 117)	February 23, 1849 (Saros 118)
January 23, 1860 (Saros 119)	December 22, 1870 (Saros 120)	November 21, 1881 (Saros 121)	October 20, 1892 (Saros 122)	September 21, 1903 (Saros 123)
August 21, 1914 (Saros 124)	July 20, 1925 (Saros 125)	June 19, 1936 (Saros 126)	May 20, 1947 (Saros 127)	April 19, 1958 (Saros 128)
March 18, 1969 (Saros 129)	February 16, 1980 (Saros 130)	January 15, 1991 (Saros 131)	December 14, 2001 (Saros 132)	November 13, 2012 (Saros 133)
October 14, 2023 (Saros 134)	September 12, 2034 (Saros 135)	August 12, 2045 (Saros 136)	July 12, 2056 (Saros 137)	June 11, 2067 (Saros 138)
May 11, 2078 (Saros 139)	April 10, 2089 (Saros 140)	March 10, 2100 (Saros 141)	February 8, 2111 (Saros 142)	January 8, 2122 (Saros 143)
December 7, 2132 (Saros 144)	November 7, 2143 (Saros 145)	October 7, 2154 (Saros 146)	September 5, 2165 (Saros 147)	August 4, 2176 (Saros 148)
July 6, 2187 (Saros 149)	June 4, 2198 (Saros 150)			

=== Inex series ===
This eclipse is a part of the long period inex cycle, repeating at alternating nodes, every 358 synodic months (≈ 10,571.95 days, or 29 years minus 20 days). Their appearance and longitude are irregular due to a lack of synchronization with the anomalistic month (period of perigee). However, groupings of 3 inex cycles (≈ 87 years minus 2 months) comes close (≈ 1,151.02 anomalistic months), so eclipses are similar in these groupings.

Series members between 1801 and 2200
January 21, 1814 (Saros 128)	December 31, 1842 (Saros 129)	December 12, 1871 (Saros 130)
November 22, 1900 (Saros 131)	November 1, 1929 (Saros 132)	October 12, 1958 (Saros 133)
September 23, 1987 (Saros 134)	September 1, 2016 (Saros 135)	August 12, 2045 (Saros 136)
July 24, 2074 (Saros 137)	July 4, 2103 (Saros 138)	June 13, 2132 (Saros 139)
May 25, 2161 (Saros 140)	May 4, 2190 (Saros 141)	

== See also ==
- List of solar eclipses in the 21st century
- List of solar eclipses visible from the United States
