= Solar eclipse of July 11, 1991 =

Total eclipse

- Total eclipse
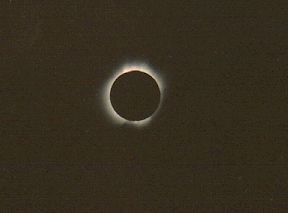
- Totality from Playas del Coco, Costa Rica

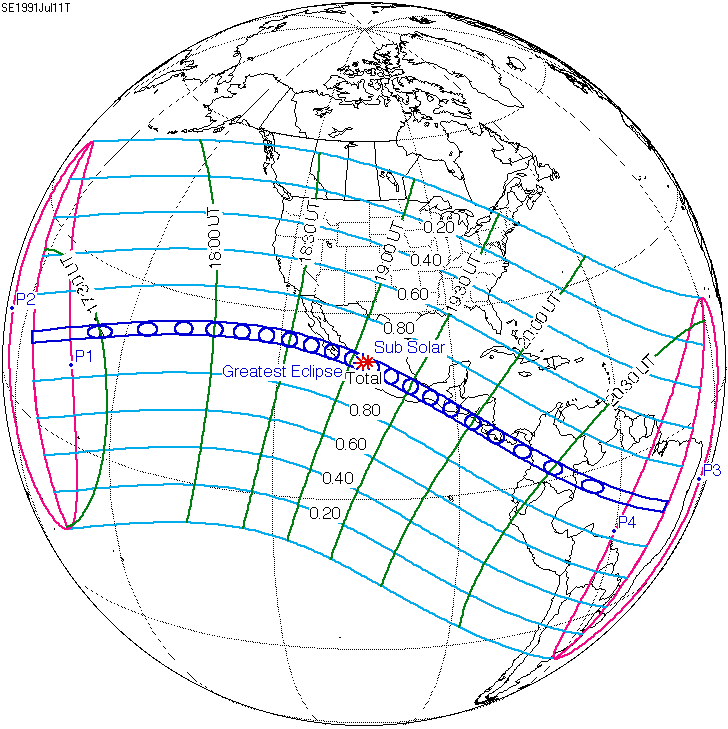
- Map
- Gamma: −0.0041
- Magnitude: 1.08

Maximum eclipse
- Duration: 413 s (6 min 53 s)
- Coordinates: 22°N 105.2°W
- Max. width of band: 258 km (160 mi)

Times (UTC)
- (P1) Partial begin: 16:28:46
- (U1) Total begin: 17:21:41
- Greatest eclipse: 19:07:01
- (U4) Total end: 20:50:28
- (P4) Partial end: 21:43:24

References
- Saros: 136 (36 of 71)
- Catalog # (SE5000): 9489

A total solar eclipse occurred at the Moon's descending node of orbit on Thursday, July 11, 1991, with a magnitude of 1.08. A solar eclipse occurs when the Moon passes between Earth and the Sun, thereby totally or partly obscuring the image of the Sun for a viewer on Earth. A total solar eclipse occurs when the Moon's apparent diameter is larger than the Sun's, blocking all direct sunlight, turning day into darkness. Totality occurs in a narrow path across Earth's surface, with the partial solar eclipse visible over a surrounding region thousands of kilometres wide. Occurring about 8 hours after perigee (on July 11, 1991, at 11:00 UTC), the Moon's apparent diameter was larger.

The eclipse lasted for 6 minutes and 53.08 seconds at the point of maximum eclipse. There will not be a longer total eclipse until June 13, 2132. This was the largest total solar eclipse of Solar Saros series 136. This eclipse was the most central total eclipse in 800 years, with a gamma of −0.00412. There will not be a more central eclipse for another 800 years. Its magnitude was also greater than any eclipse since the 6th century.

Totality began over the Pacific Ocean and Hawaii, moving across Mexico, down through the Central American countries of Guatemala, El Salvador, Honduras, Nicaragua, Costa Rica and Panama, across Colombia and ending over Brazil. A partial eclipse was visible for parts of southern Canada, the United States, Mexico, Central America, the Caribbean, and South America.

== Observations ==
Animation of eclipse path

An observation team funded by the National Natural Science Foundation of China made near-infrared spectroscopic observations in the southern suburbs of La Paz, Baja California Sur, Mexico. Weather was clear on the eclipse day in La Paz. The team captured dozens of frames of the slitless spectrum of the upper layer of photosphere and chromosphere, and the slit spectrum outside the solar surface. They also captured images of the chromosphere and solar prominences. Among the professional observation teams from various countries to La Paz, six used the new CCD sensors for the first time in solar eclipse observation. Among them, the Chinese and Japanese team used it to observe long-wavelength spectra. A team of 320 people from NASA's Johnson Space Center made observation in Mazatlán, Mexico. The local weather was not ideal in the days before the eclipse, but got slightly better as the eclipse day approached. Some people went to San Blas, Nayarit for better weather conditions. In the end, a hole in the clouds appeared in El Cid in western Mazatlan, through which the corona and prominences was visible. Other observers 1 to 5 miles away were clouded out. In San Blas, the corona and prominences were still visible, even though the clouds became thicker during totality. Scientists from the Royal Observatory of Belgium, the Institute of Geodesy and Geophysics of the Chinese Academy of Sciences, and the Institute of Geophysics of the National Autonomous University of Mexico made observations in Mexico City to study the change in gravity during a total solar eclipse.

== Alleged ancient Maya prediction ==
The American ethnographer and anthropologist Victoria Bricker and her late husband and colleague Harvey Bricker, claim in their book "Astronomy in the Maya Codices" that by decoding pre-Columbian glyphs from the four Maya codices they discovered that pre-16th century Maya astronomers predicted the solar eclipse of July 11, 1991. In their 2011 volume, the husband-wife Brickers team explain how they translated the dates from the Maya calendar, then used modern scientific knowledge of planetary orbits to line up the data from the Maya prediction with the Gregorian calendar. Reviewers disputed the claim in 2014, concluding that, "loose hieroglyphic readings and accommodating pattern matching occurs throughout the book."

== Eclipse timing ==
=== Places experiencing total eclipse ===
Solar Eclipse of July 11, 1991 (Local Times)
Country or territory	City or place	Start of partial eclipse	Start of total eclipse	Maximum eclipse	End of total eclipse	End of partial eclipse	Duration of totality (min:s)	Duration of eclipse (hr:min)	Maximum magnitude
United States	Hilo	06:30:41	07:28:25	07:30:27	07:32:30	08:38:10	4:05	2:07	1.0273
Mexico	Mazatlán	10:32:35	11:58:50	12:01:36	12:04:21	13:28:23	5:31	2:56	1.0163
Mexico	Tepic	10:37:18	12:04:05	12:07:24	12:10:42	13:34:01	6:37	2:57	1.0288
Mexico	Guadalajara	11:41:50	13:09:13	13:12:20	13:15:26	14:38:17	6:13	2:56	1.0231
Mexico	Aguascalientes	11:43:41	13:11:43	13:13:25	13:15:06	14:38:22	3:23	2:55	1.0055
Mexico	León	11:45:49	13:12:56	13:15:53	13:18:49	14:40:40	5:53	2:55	1.0201
Mexico	Mexico City	11:54:01	13:20:58	13:24:17	13:27:36	14:47:43	6:38	2:54	1.0329
Mexico	Ecatepec	11:54:08	13:21:08	13:24:19	13:27:29	14:47:39	6:21	2:54	1.0269
Mexico	Texcoco	11:54:36	13:21:36	13:24:46	13:27:55	14:48:00	6:19	2:53	1.0264
Mexico	Cuernavaca	11:54:16	13:21:29	13:24:47	13:28:05	14:48:21	6:36	2:54	1.0313
Mexico	Puebla	11:56:53	13:23:47	13:27:00	13:30:13	14:49:50	6:26	2:53	1.0291
Mexico	Oaxaca	12:03:02	13:30:31	13:33:15	13:35:59	14:55:10	5:28	2:52	1.0175
Mexico	Tuxtla Gutiérrez	12:13:05	13:39:38	13:41:30	13:43:22	15:00:44	3:44	2:48	1.0076
Guatemala	Quetzaltenango	13:19:39	14:44:25	14:47:34	14:50:42	16:05:40	6:17	2:46	1.0369
Guatemala	Escuintla	13:22:24	14:46:45	14:49:50	14:52:54	16:07:18	6:09	2:45	1.0334
Guatemala	Guatemala City	13:22:38	14:47:09	14:49:51	14:52:32	16:07:07	5:23	2:44	1.0199
El Salvador	Santa Ana	12:26:00	13:50:01	13:52:37	13:55:13	15:09:08	5:12	2:43	1.0185
El Salvador	San Salvador	12:27:20	13:51:04	13:53:43	13:56:21	15:09:57	5:17	2:43	1.0198
El Salvador	San Vicente	12:28:27	13:52:16	13:54:33	13:56:49	15:10:27	4:33	2:42	1.0134
El Salvador	San Miguel	12:30:13	13:54:16	13:55:52	13:57:28	15:11:19	3:12	2:41	1.0062
Nicaragua	León	12:34:54	13:57:44	13:59:40	14:01:35	15:14:04	3:51	2:39	1.0096
Nicaragua	Managua	12:36:50	13:59:40	14:01:07	14:02:34	15:15:03	2:54	2:38	1.0053
Nicaragua	Masaya	12:37:28	14:00:00	14:01:38	14:03:16	15:15:26	3:16	2:38	1.0069
Costa Rica	Liberia	12:40:57	14:01:48	14:04:39	14:07:28	15:17:51	5:40	2:37	1.0306
Costa Rica	Alajuela	12:44:42	14:04:48	14:07:25	14:10:00	15:19:40	5:12	2:35	1.0231
Costa Rica	San José	12:45:07	14:05:08	14:07:44	14:10:18	15:19:53	5:10	2:35	1.0227
Costa Rica	Limón	12:47:28	14:09:10	14:09:12	14:09:15	15:20:37	0:05	2:33	1.0003
Panama	David	13:51:00	15:09:29	15:12:12	15:14:54	16:23:02	5:25	2:32	1.0308
Panama	Santiago de Veraguas	13:54:37	15:12:43	15:14:37	15:16:31	16:24:25	3:48	2:30	1.0111
Colombia	Cali	14:09:42	15:23:20	15:25:40	15:27:58	16:31:59	4:38	2:22	1.0234

=== Places experiencing partial eclipse ===
Solar Eclipse of July 11, 1991 (Local Times)
Country or territory	City or place	Start of partial eclipse	Maximum eclipse	End of partial eclipse	Duration of eclipse (hr:min)	Maximum coverage
United States	Honolulu	06:31:28	07:29:45	08:35:21	2:04	96.33%
United States	Los Angeles	10:12:12	11:27:55	12:47:22	2:35	69.13%
Mexico	Hermosillo	10:22:06	11:45:29	13:09:54	2:48	85.16%
Mexico	Acapulco	11:54:51	13:26:08	14:50:12	2:55	96.27%
Mexico	Veracruz	12:02:16	13:31:25	14:52:41	2:50	99.46%
Mexico	Cancún	12:25:39	13:46:30	14:59:02	2:33	72.61%
Belize	Belmopan	12:24:05	13:49:06	15:04:44	2:41	90.73%
Cuba	Havana	14:36:24	15:50:35	16:57:25	2:21	55.97%
Honduras	Tegucigalpa	12:31:54	13:56:39	15:11:20	2:39	97.52%
Cayman Islands	George Town	13:41:30	14:57:57	16:06:03	2:25	66.19%
Nicaragua	Matagalpa	12:36:38	14:00:32	15:14:13	2:38	98.26%
Jamaica	Kingston	13:53:54	15:06:00	16:10:11	2:16	59.76%
Haiti	Port-au-Prince	15:04:04	16:10:13	17:09:32	2:05	48.22%
Dominican Republic	Santo Domingo	15:09:34	16:12:44	17:09:35	2:00	43.46%
Panama	Panama City	13:56:35	15:15:19	16:24:08	2:28	96.12%
Aruba	Oranjestad	15:12:52	16:20:46	17:21:08	2:08	61.79%
Curaçao	Willemstad	15:15:20	16:22:16	17:21:50	2:07	60.68%
Venezuela	Caracas	15:20:14	16:25:53	17:24:23	2:04	61.35%
Colombia	Bogotá	14:12:37	15:26:46	16:31:44	2:19	97.62%
Ecuador	Quito	14:11:27	15:27:27	16:33:47	2:22	86.91%
Trinidad and Tobago	Port of Spain	15:29:24	16:29:10	17:23:00	1:54	49.64%
Brazil	São Paulo	16:56:43	17:31:46	17:35:10 (sunset)	0:38	45.91%
Guyana	Georgetown	15:35:54	16:34:53	17:28:05	1:52	55.24%
Peru	Iquitos	14:24:14	15:35:44	16:38:33	2:14	86.92%
Suriname	Paramaribo	16:40:03	17:36:52	18:28:21	1:48	52.79%
Peru	Lima	14:32:43	15:38:16	16:36:32	2:04	48.89%
French Guiana	Cayenne	16:43:28	17:38:21	18:28:19	1:45	50.57%
Bolivia	Riberalta	15:40:19	16:44:59	17:42:40	2:02	76.31%
Bolivia	La Paz	15:45:25	16:46:03	17:40:35	1:55	52.12%
Brazil	Brasília	16:52:55	17:47:49	17:54:20 (sunset)	1:01	90.97%

== Gallery ==
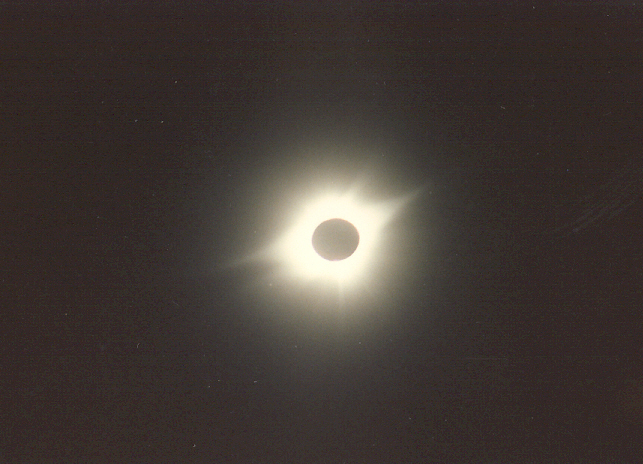
View near the end of totality, Playas del Coco, Guanacaste, Costa Rica

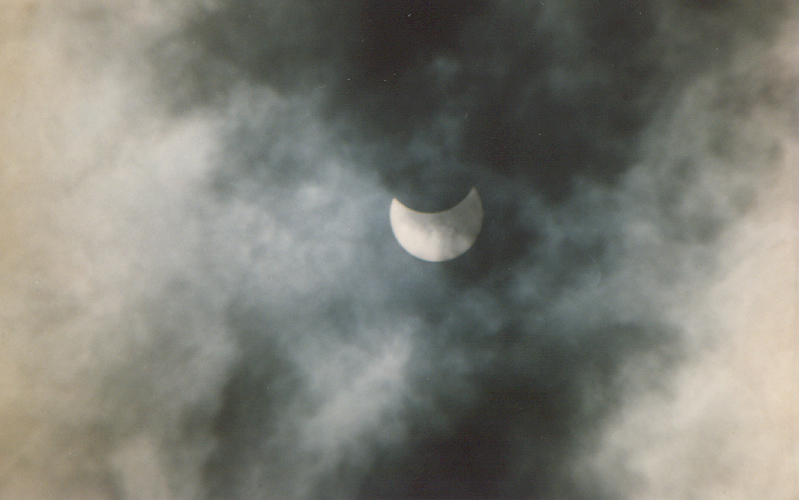
Partial phase before totality as seen through the cloud cover, Playas del Coco, Guanacaste, Costa Rica

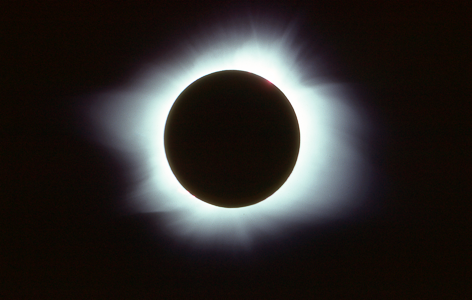
Totality as seen on the Mexican coast south of Mazatlan

== In popular culture ==
The 1991 eclipse appears in the music video for Cosas del Amor, a duet by Vikki Carr and Ana Gabriel.

== Eclipse details ==
Shown below are two tables displaying details about this particular solar eclipse. The first table outlines times at which the Moon's penumbra or umbra attains the specific parameter, and the second table describes various other parameters pertaining to this eclipse.

July 11, 1991 Solar Eclipse Times
Event	Time (UTC)
First Penumbral External Contact	1991 July 11 at 16:29:42.3 UTC
First Umbral External Contact	1991 July 11 at 17:22:36.8 UTC
First Central Line	1991 July 11 at 17:24:13.8 UTC
First Umbral Internal Contact	1991 July 11 at 17:25:50.7 UTC
First Penumbral Internal Contact	1991 July 11 at 18:18:45.5 UTC
Greatest Duration	1991 July 11 at 19:01:51.6 UTC
Greatest Eclipse	1991 July 11 at 19:07:00.8 UTC
Ecliptic Conjunction	1991 July 11 at 19:07:03.3 UTC
Equatorial Conjunction	1991 July 11 at 19:07:07.0 UTC
Last Penumbral Internal Contact	1991 July 11 at 19:55:15.7 UTC
Last Umbral Internal Contact	1991 July 11 at 20:48:11.3 UTC
Last Central Line	1991 July 11 at 20:49:47.8 UTC
Last Umbral External Contact	1991 July 11 at 20:51:24.3 UTC
Last Penumbral External Contact	1991 July 11 at 21:44:20.2 UTC

July 11, 1991 Solar Eclipse Parameters
Parameter	Value
Eclipse Magnitude	1.07997
Eclipse Obscuration	1.16633
Gamma	−0.00412
Sun Right Ascension	07h22m12.8s
Sun Declination	+22°05'48.5"
Sun Semi-Diameter	15'43.9"
Sun Equatorial Horizontal Parallax	08.7"
Moon Right Ascension	07h22m12.5s
Moon Declination	+22°05'33.9"
Moon Semi-Diameter	16'42.1"
Moon Equatorial Horizontal Parallax	1°01'17.7"
ΔT	57.9 s

== Eclipse season ==
This eclipse is part of an eclipse season, a period, roughly every six months, when eclipses occur. Only two (or occasionally three) eclipse seasons occur each year, and each season lasts about 35 days and repeats just short of six months (173 days) later; thus two full eclipse seasons always occur each year. Either two or three eclipses happen each eclipse season. In the sequence below, each eclipse is separated by a fortnight. The first and last eclipse in this sequence is separated by one synodic month.

Eclipse season of June–July 1991
June 27 Ascending node (full moon)	July 11 Descending node (new moon)	July 26 Ascending node (full moon)
Penumbral lunar eclipse Lunar Saros 110	Total solar eclipse Solar Saros 136	Penumbral lunar eclipse Lunar Saros 148

== Related eclipses ==
=== Eclipses in 1991 ===
- An annular solar eclipse on January 15.
- A penumbral lunar eclipse on January 30.
- A penumbral lunar eclipse on June 27.
- A total solar eclipse on July 11.
- A penumbral lunar eclipse on July 26.
- A partial lunar eclipse on December 21.

=== Metonic ===
- Preceded by: Solar eclipse of September 23, 1987
- Followed by: Solar eclipse of April 29, 1995

=== Tzolkinex ===
- Preceded by: Solar eclipse of May 30, 1984
- Followed by: Solar eclipse of August 22, 1998

=== Half-Saros ===
- Preceded by: Lunar eclipse of July 6, 1982
- Followed by: Lunar eclipse of July 16, 2000

=== Tritos ===
- Preceded by: Solar eclipse of August 10, 1980
- Followed by: Solar eclipse of June 10, 2002

=== Solar Saros 136 ===
- Preceded by: Solar eclipse of June 30, 1973
- Followed by: Solar eclipse of July 22, 2009

=== Inex ===
- Preceded by: Solar eclipse of July 31, 1962
- Followed by: Solar eclipse of June 21, 2020

=== Triad ===
- Preceded by: Solar eclipse of September 9, 1904
- Followed by: Solar eclipse of May 11, 2078

=== Solar eclipses of 1990–1992 ===
This eclipse is a member of a semester series. An eclipse in a semester series of solar eclipses repeats approximately every 177 days and 4 hours (a semester) at alternating nodes of the Moon's orbit.

Solar eclipse series sets from 1990 to 1992
Ascending node			Descending node		
Saros	Map	Gamma	Saros	Map	Gamma
121	January 26, 1990 Annular	−0.9457	126 Partial in Finland	July 22, 1990 Total	0.7597
131	January 15, 1991 Annular	−0.2727	136 Totality in Playas del Coco, Costa Rica	July 11, 1991 Total	−0.0041
141	January 4, 1992 Annular	0.4091	146	June 30, 1992 Total	−0.7512
151	December 24, 1992 Partial	1.0711			

=== Saros 136 ===
This eclipse is a part of Saros series 136, repeating every 18 years, 11 days, and containing 71 events. The series started with a partial solar eclipse on June 14, 1360. It contains annular eclipses from September 8, 1504 through November 12, 1594; hybrid eclipses from November 22, 1612 through January 17, 1703; and total eclipses from January 27, 1721 through May 13, 2496. The series ends at member 71 as a partial eclipse on July 30, 2622. Its eclipses are tabulated in three columns; every third eclipse in the same column is one exeligmos apart, so they all cast shadows over approximately the same parts of the Earth.

The longest duration of annularity was produced by member 9 at 32 seconds on September 8, 1504, and the longest duration of totality was produced by member 34 at 7 minutes, 7.74 seconds on June 20, 1955. All eclipses in this series occur at the Moon’s descending node of orbit.

Series members 26–47 occur between 1801 and 2200:
26	27	28
March 24, 1811	April 3, 1829	April 15, 1847
29	30	31
April 25, 1865	May 6, 1883	May 18, 1901
32	33	34
May 29, 1919	June 8, 1937	June 20, 1955
35	36	37
June 30, 1973	July 11, 1991	July 22, 2009
38	39	40
August 2, 2027	August 12, 2045	August 24, 2063
41	42	43
September 3, 2081	September 14, 2099	September 26, 2117
44	45	46
October 7, 2135	October 17, 2153	October 29, 2171
47
November 8, 2189

=== Metonic series ===
The metonic series repeats eclipses every 19 years (6939.69 days), lasting about 5 cycles. Eclipses occur in nearly the same calendar date. In addition, the octon subseries repeats 1/5 of that or every 3.8 years (1387.94 days). All eclipses in this table occur at the Moon's descending node.

21 eclipse events between July 11, 1953 and July 11, 2029
July 10–11	April 29–30	February 15–16	December 4	September 21–23
116	118	120	122	124
July 11, 1953	April 30, 1957	February 15, 1961	December 4, 1964	September 22, 1968
126	128	130	132	134
July 10, 1972	April 29, 1976	February 16, 1980	December 4, 1983	September 23, 1987
136	138	140	142	144
July 11, 1991	April 29, 1995	February 16, 1999	December 4, 2002	September 22, 2006
146	148	150	152	154
July 11, 2010	April 29, 2014	February 15, 2018	December 4, 2021	September 21, 2025
156
July 11, 2029

=== Tritos series ===
This eclipse is a part of a tritos cycle, repeating at alternating nodes every 135 synodic months (≈ 3986.63 days, or 11 years minus 1 month). Their appearance and longitude are irregular due to a lack of synchronization with the anomalistic month (period of perigee), but groupings of 3 tritos cycles (≈ 33 years minus 3 months) come close (≈ 434.044 anomalistic months), so eclipses are similar in these groupings.

Series members between 1801 and 2200
December 21, 1805 (Saros 119)	November 19, 1816 (Saros 120)	October 20, 1827 (Saros 121)	September 18, 1838 (Saros 122)	August 18, 1849 (Saros 123)
July 18, 1860 (Saros 124)	June 18, 1871 (Saros 125)	May 17, 1882 (Saros 126)	April 16, 1893 (Saros 127)	March 17, 1904 (Saros 128)
February 14, 1915 (Saros 129)	January 14, 1926 (Saros 130)	December 13, 1936 (Saros 131)	November 12, 1947 (Saros 132)	October 12, 1958 (Saros 133)
September 11, 1969 (Saros 134)	August 10, 1980 (Saros 135)	July 11, 1991 (Saros 136)	June 10, 2002 (Saros 137)	May 10, 2013 (Saros 138)
April 8, 2024 (Saros 139)	March 9, 2035 (Saros 140)	February 5, 2046 (Saros 141)	January 5, 2057 (Saros 142)	December 6, 2067 (Saros 143)
November 4, 2078 (Saros 144)	October 4, 2089 (Saros 145)	September 4, 2100 (Saros 146)	August 4, 2111 (Saros 147)	July 4, 2122 (Saros 148)
June 3, 2133 (Saros 149)	May 3, 2144 (Saros 150)	April 2, 2155 (Saros 151)	March 2, 2166 (Saros 152)	January 29, 2177 (Saros 153)
December 29, 2187 (Saros 154)	November 28, 2198 (Saros 155)			

=== Inex series ===
This eclipse is a part of the long period inex cycle, repeating at alternating nodes, every 358 synodic months (≈ 10,571.95 days, or 29 years minus 20 days). Their appearance and longitude are irregular due to a lack of synchronization with the anomalistic month (period of perigee). However, groupings of 3 inex cycles (≈ 87 years minus 2 months) comes close (≈ 1,151.02 anomalistic months), so eclipses are similar in these groupings.

Series members between 1801 and 2200
November 9, 1817 (Saros 130)	October 20, 1846 (Saros 131)	September 29, 1875 (Saros 132)
September 9, 1904 (Saros 133)	August 21, 1933 (Saros 134)	July 31, 1962 (Saros 135)
July 11, 1991 (Saros 136)	June 21, 2020 (Saros 137)	May 31, 2049 (Saros 138)
May 11, 2078 (Saros 139)	April 23, 2107 (Saros 140)	April 1, 2136 (Saros 141)
March 12, 2165 (Saros 142)	February 21, 2194 (Saros 143)	
