= Solar eclipse of January 4, 2011 =

21st-century partial solar eclipse

- Partial eclipse
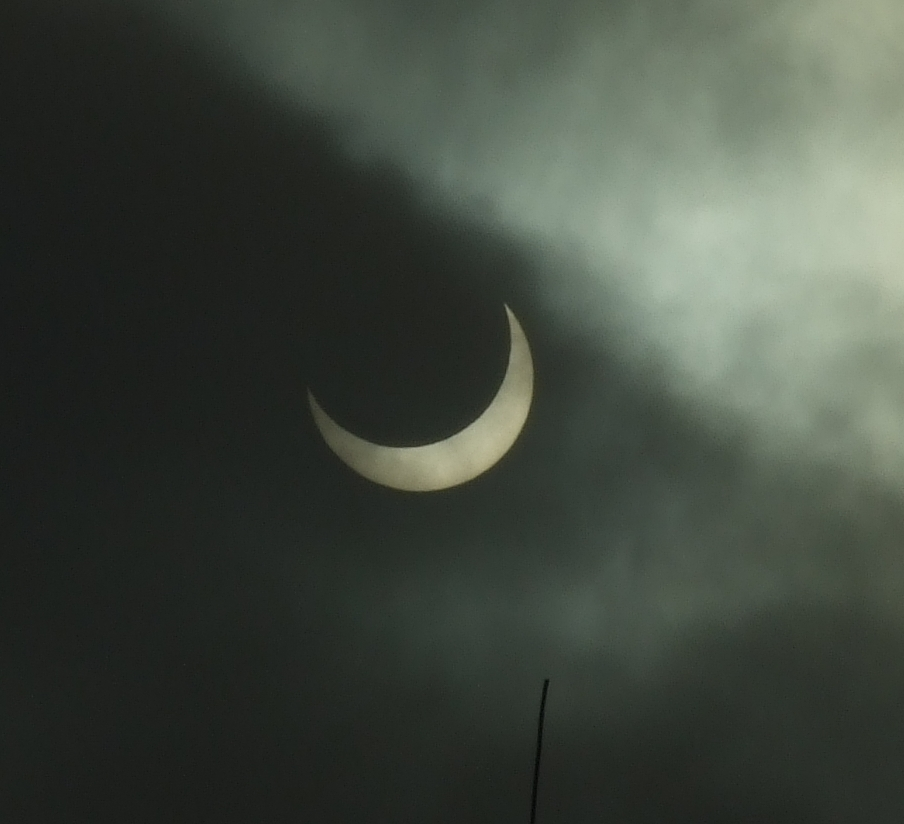
- Partial from Poland

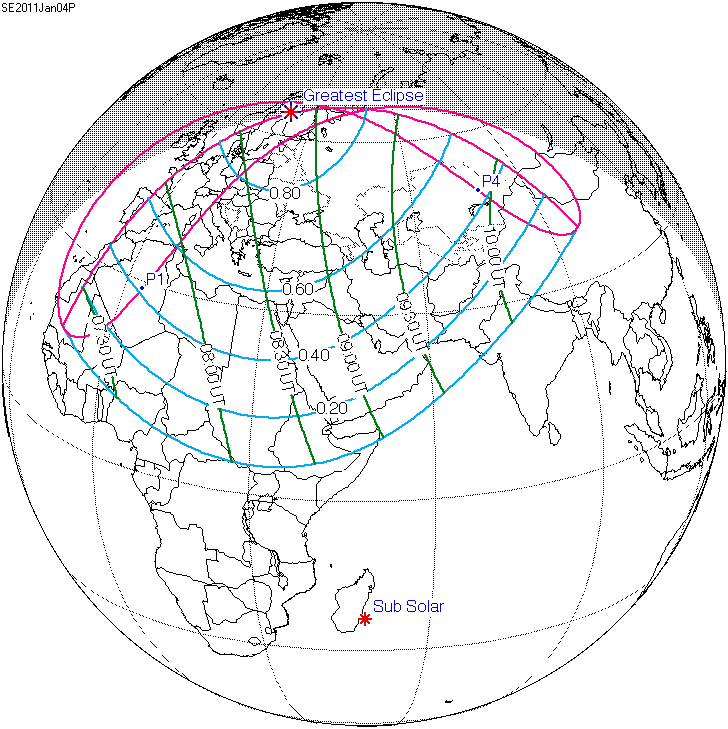
- Map
- Gamma: 1.0627
- Magnitude: 0.8576

Maximum eclipse
- Coordinates: 64.7°N 20.8°E

Times (UTC)
- (P1) Partial begin: 6:40:11
- Greatest eclipse: 8:51:42
- (P4) Partial end: 11:00:52

References
- Saros: 151 (14 of 72)
- Catalog # (SE5000): 9531

A partial solar eclipse occurred at the Moon’s ascending node of orbit on Tuesday, January 4, 2011, with a magnitude of 0.8576. A solar eclipse occurs when the Moon passes between Earth and the Sun, thereby totally or partly obscuring the image of the Sun for a viewer on Earth. A partial solar eclipse occurs in the polar regions of the Earth when the center of the Moon's shadow misses the Earth.

This was the first of four partial solar eclipses in 2011, with the others occurring on June 1, July 1, and November 25.

The greatest eclipse occurred at 08:51 UTC in northern Sweden. At that time, the axis of the Moon's shadow passed a mere 510 km above Earth's surface.

The eclipse was visible near sunrise over most of Europe before moving over central Asia. It ended at sunset over east Asia. It was visible as a minor partial eclipse over north Africa and the Middle East.

== Images ==
Animated path

== Eclipse timing ==
=== Places experiencing partial eclipse ===
Solar Eclipse of January 4, 2011 (Local Times)
Country or territory	City or place	Start of partial eclipse	Maximum eclipse	End of partial eclipse	Duration of eclipse (hr:min)	Maximum coverage
France	Paris	08:43:47 (sunrise)	09:09:35	10:30:29	1:47	64.97%
Italy	Rome	07:51:58	09:10:25	10:38:26	2:46	60.71%
United Kingdom	London	08:05:42 (sunrise)	08:11:48	09:31:02	1:25	66.78%
Switzerland	Zurich	08:12:58 (sunrise)	09:13:33	10:38:27	2:25	66.52%
Luxembourg	Luxembourg	08:31:56 (sunrise)	09:14:25	10:37:31	2:06	68.06%
Belgium	Brussels	08:44:38 (sunrise)	09:14:38	10:36:30	1:52	68.56%
Netherlands	Amsterdam	08:49:56 (sunrise)	09:17:37	10:39:26	1:50	70.49%
Croatia	Zagreb	07:59:41	09:20:50	10:50:16	2:51	67.68%
Greece	Athens	08:57:34	10:23:37	11:58:20	3:01	58.24%
Austria	Vienna	08:03:30	09:24:44	10:53:28	2:50	70.63%
Czech Republic	Prague	08:04:51	09:24:45	10:51:53	2:51	72.04%
Slovakia	Bratislava	08:04:03	09:25:42	10:54:45	2:51	70.76%
Serbia	Belgrade	08:02:21	09:26:21	10:58:06	2:56	67.57%
Germany	Berlin	08:16:44 (sunrise)	09:26:57	10:52:35	2:36	74.00%
Hungary	Budapest	08:04:48	09:27:39	10:57:46	2:53	70.48%
Bulgaria	Sofia	09:02:38	10:28:34	12:02:05	2:59	65.20%
Denmark	Copenhagen	08:37:56 (sunrise)	09:30:37	10:54:24	2:16	76.17%
Norway	Oslo	09:16:55 (sunrise)	09:34:57	10:55:56	1:39	77.93%
Romania	Bucharest	09:08:14	10:35:33	12:09:04	3:01	67.52%
Poland	Warsaw	08:13:51	09:36:32	11:04:43	2:51	75.23%
Sweden	Stockholm	08:42:33 (sunrise)	09:41:37	11:04:40	2:22	78.95%
Moldova	Chișinău	09:15:16	10:43:11	12:15:40	3:00	70.20%
Turkey	Ankara	09:12:44	10:44:05	12:19:38	3:07	60.27%
Lithuania	Vilnius	09:21:55	10:45:19	12:12:38	2:51	76.94%
Latvia	Riga	09:24:10	10:46:05	12:11:42	2:48	78.19%
Belarus	Minsk	09:23:15	10:47:47	12:15:49	2:53	76.24%
Ukraine	Kyiv	09:22:05	10:49:15	12:19:41	2:58	73.13%
Estonia	Tallinn	09:28:33	10:49:25	12:13:18	2:45	79.10%
Finland	Helsinki	09:29:50	10:50:21	12:13:43	2:44	79.28%
Russia	Moscow	10:38:12	12:03:52	13:29:58	2:52	74.58%

== Gallery ==
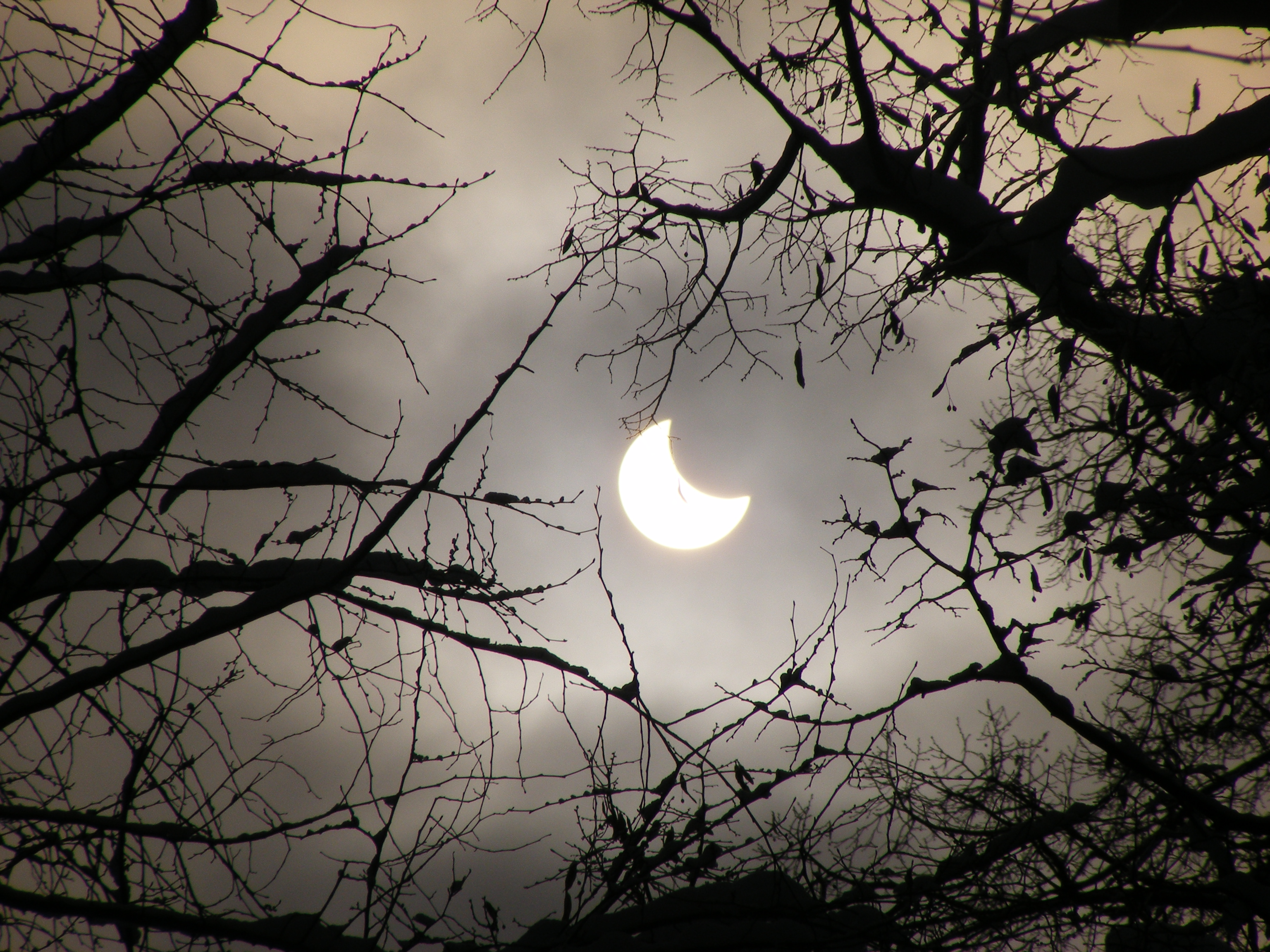
Slobozia, Romania at 7:52 UTC

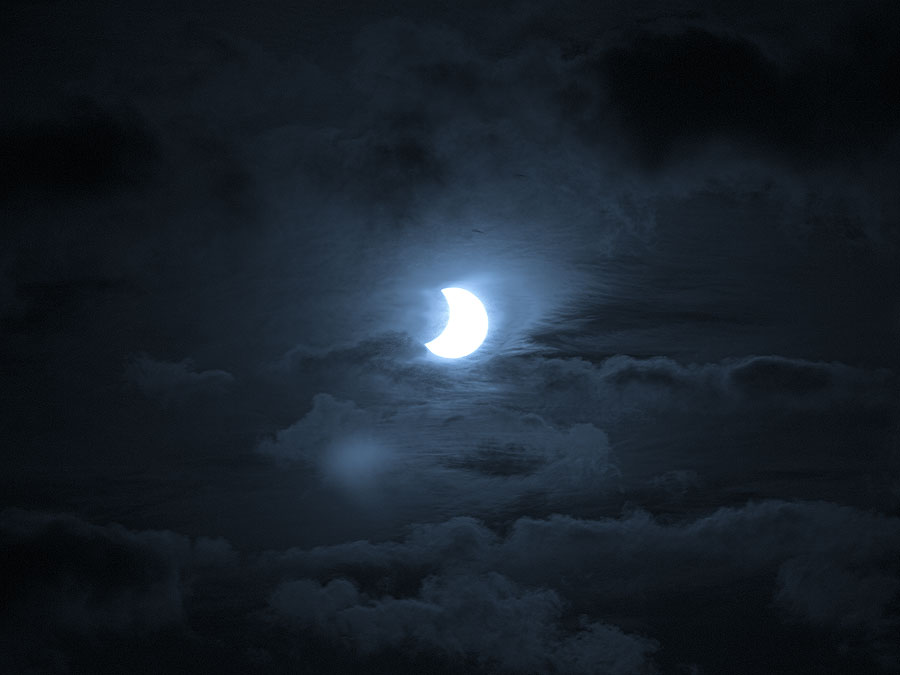
Almería, Spain at 8:03 UTC

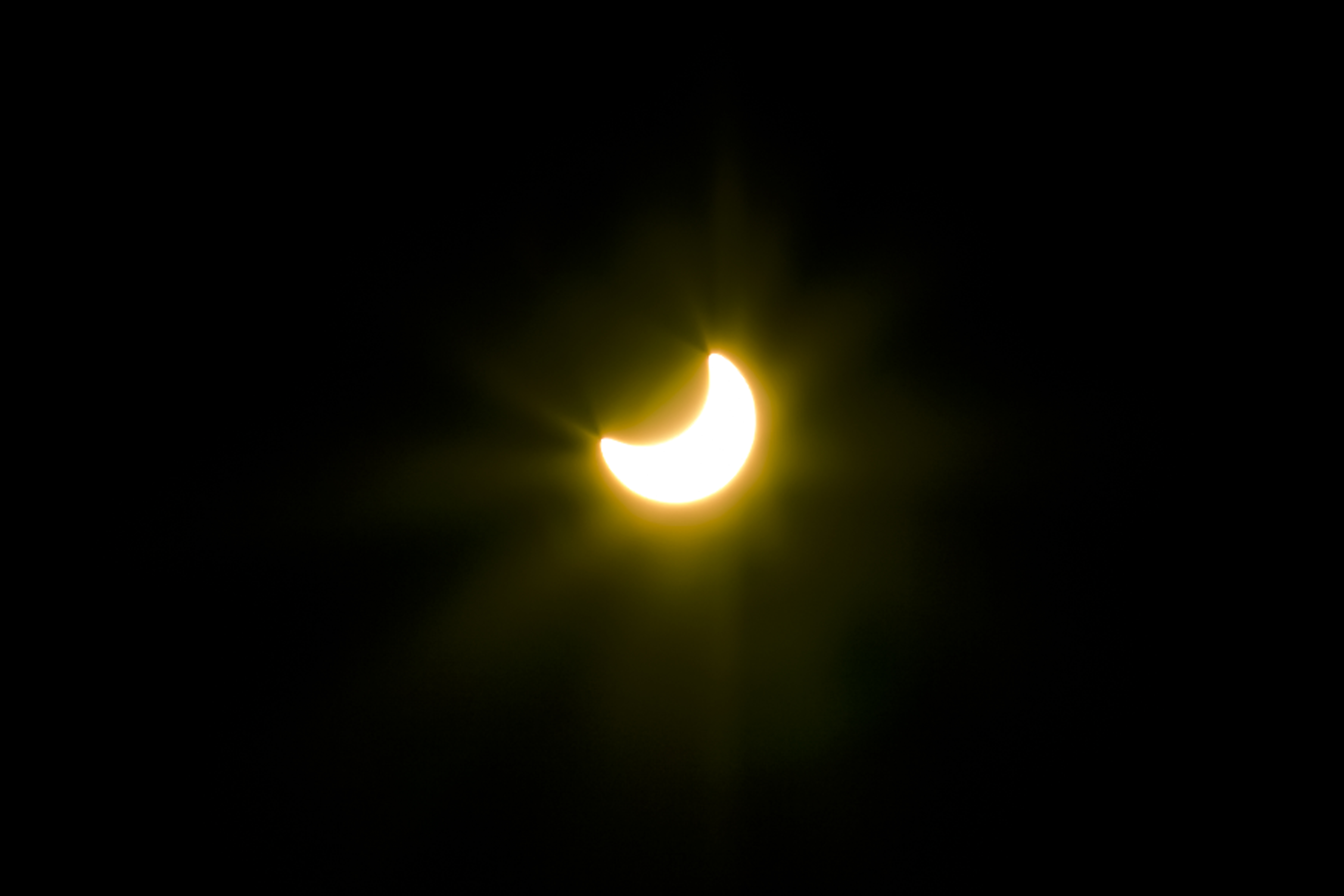
Avellino, Italy at 8:18 UTC

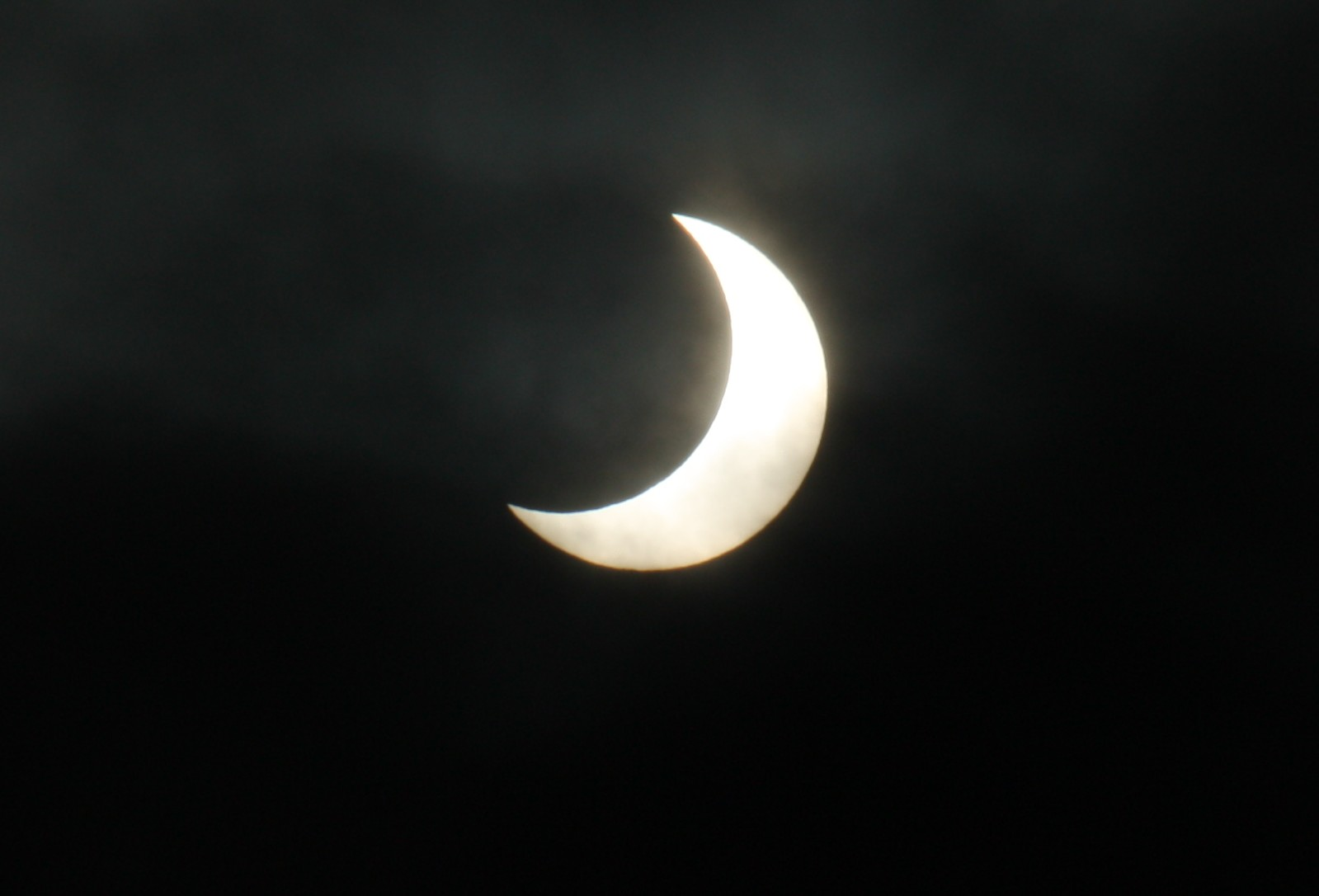
Ebersberg, Germany at 8:32 UTC

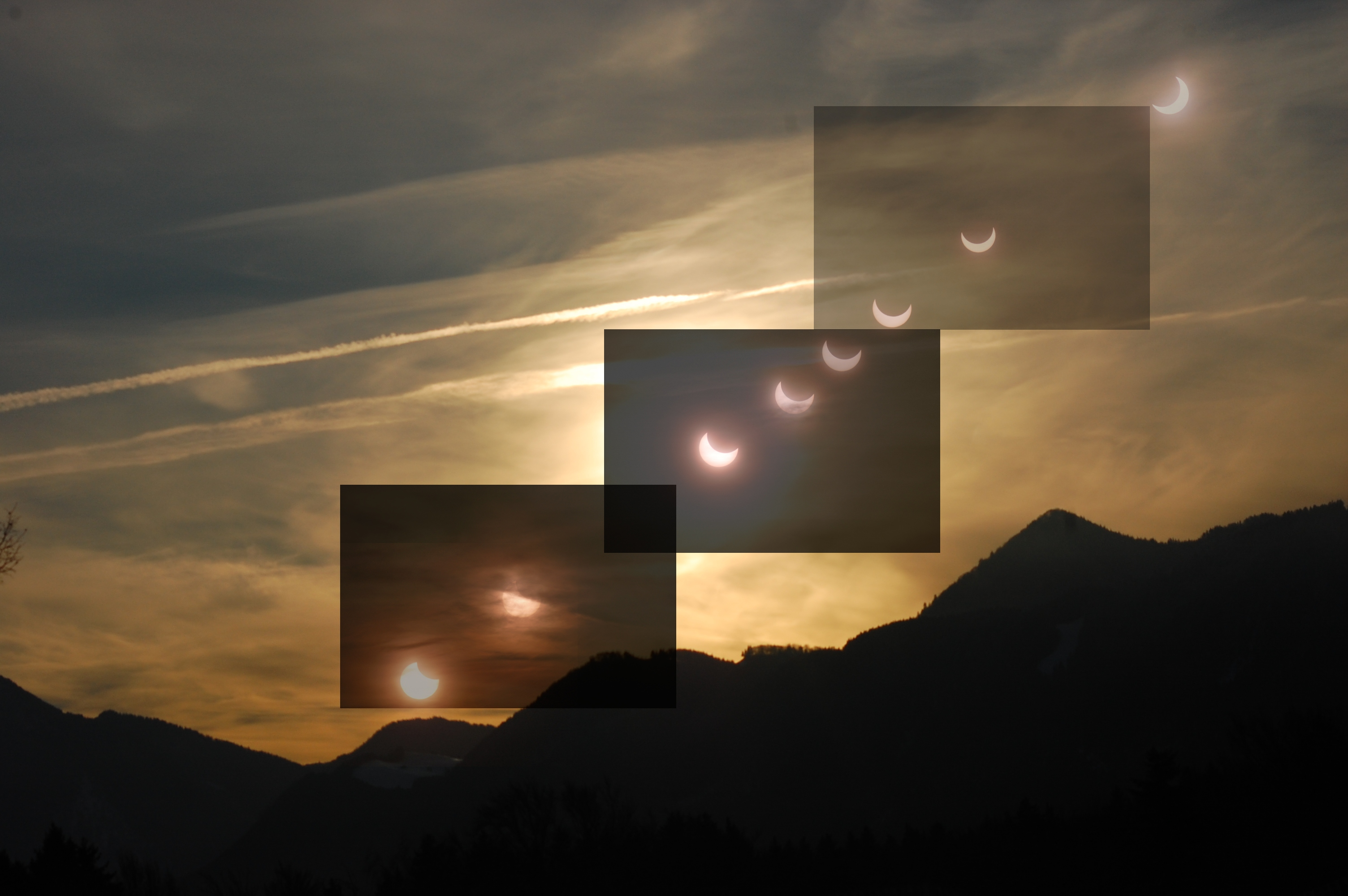
Composite image from Bernau am Chiemsee, Germany

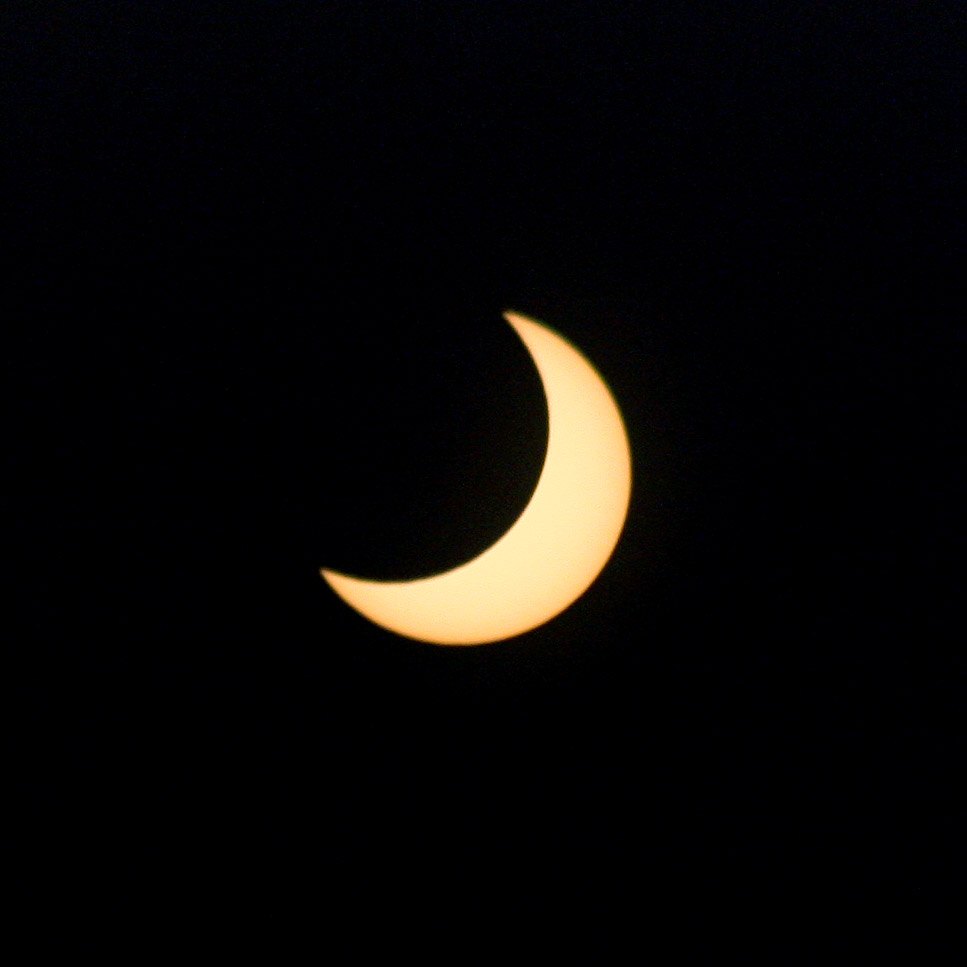
Vienna, Austria at 8:34 UTC

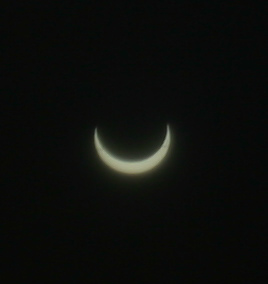
Stockholm, Sweden at 8:36 UTC

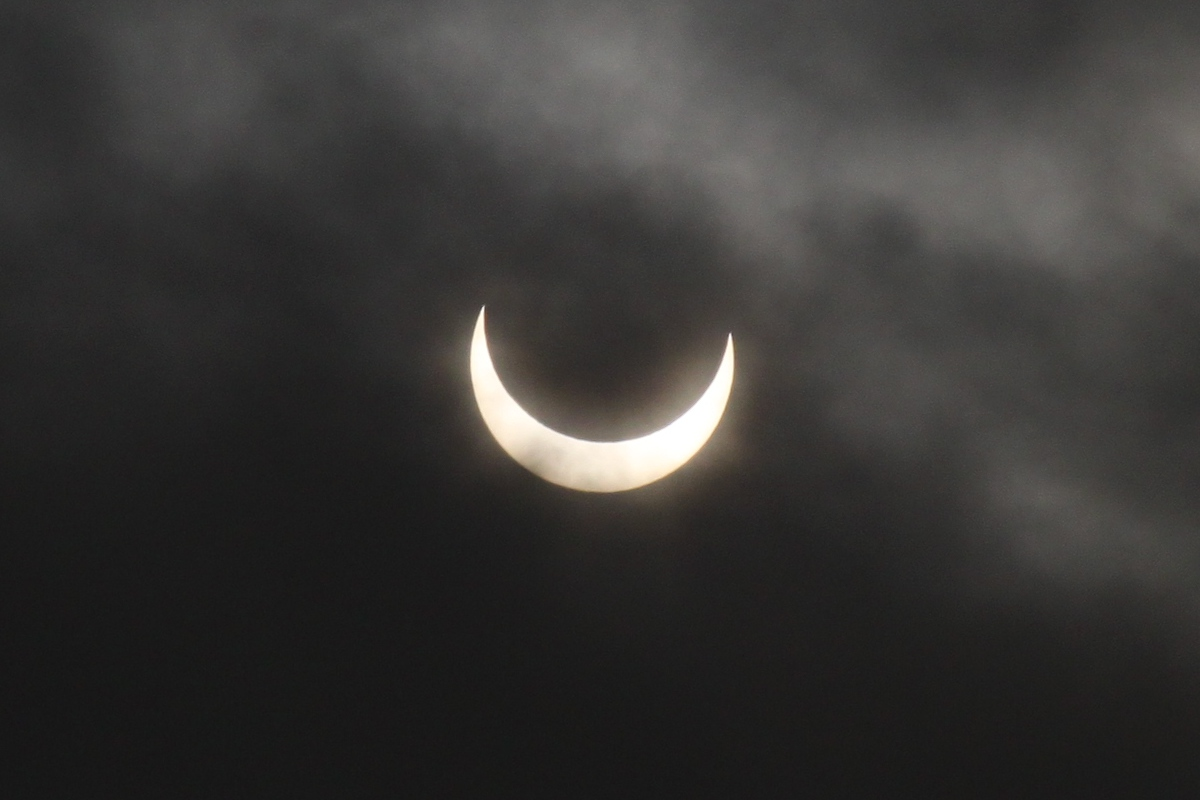
Marki, Poland at 8:38 UTC

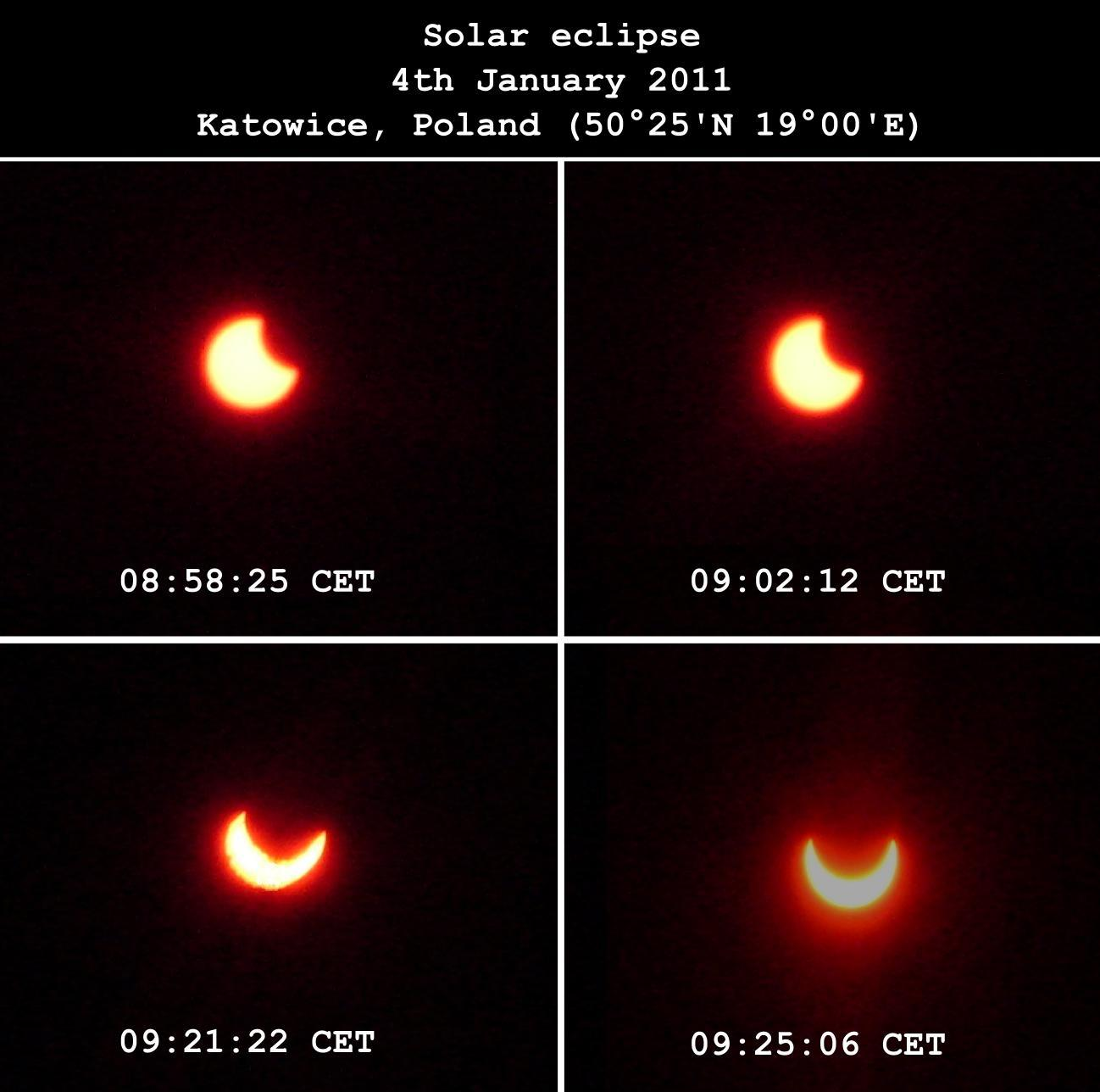
Progression from Katowice, Poland

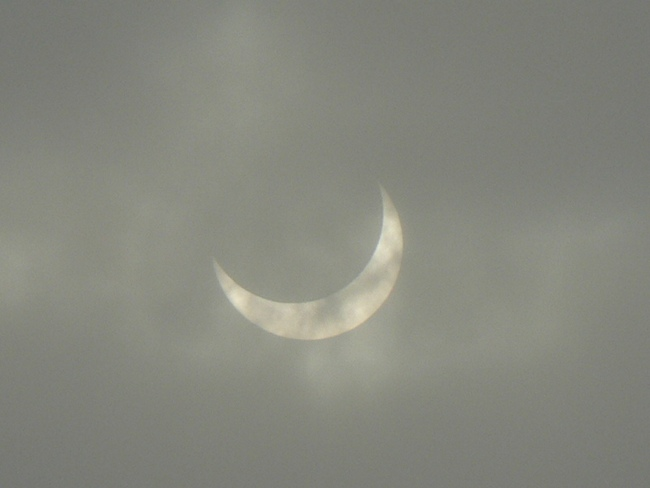
Petrov nad Desnou, Czech Republic at 8:41 UTC

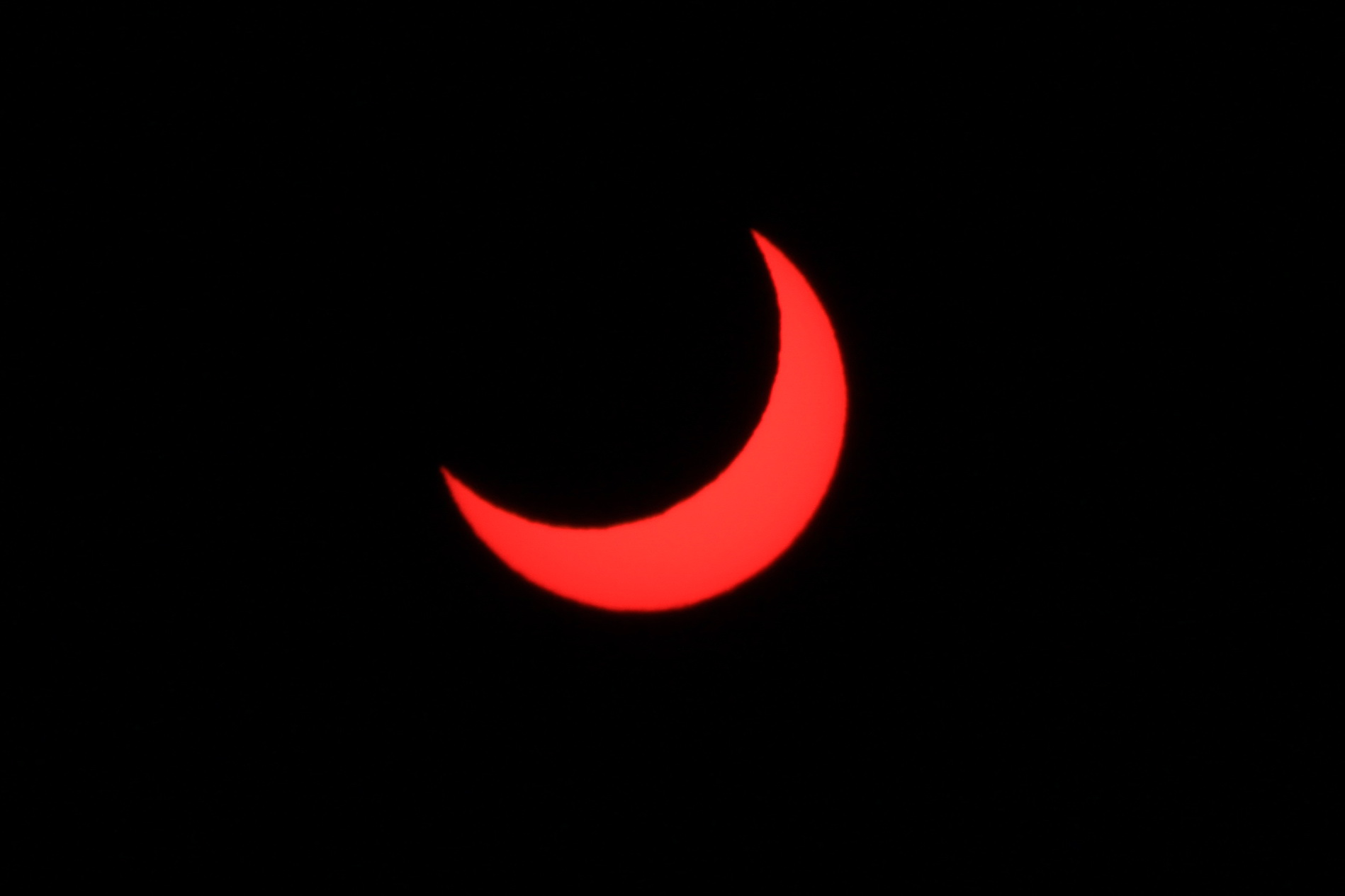
Bratislava, Slovakia at 8:43 UTC

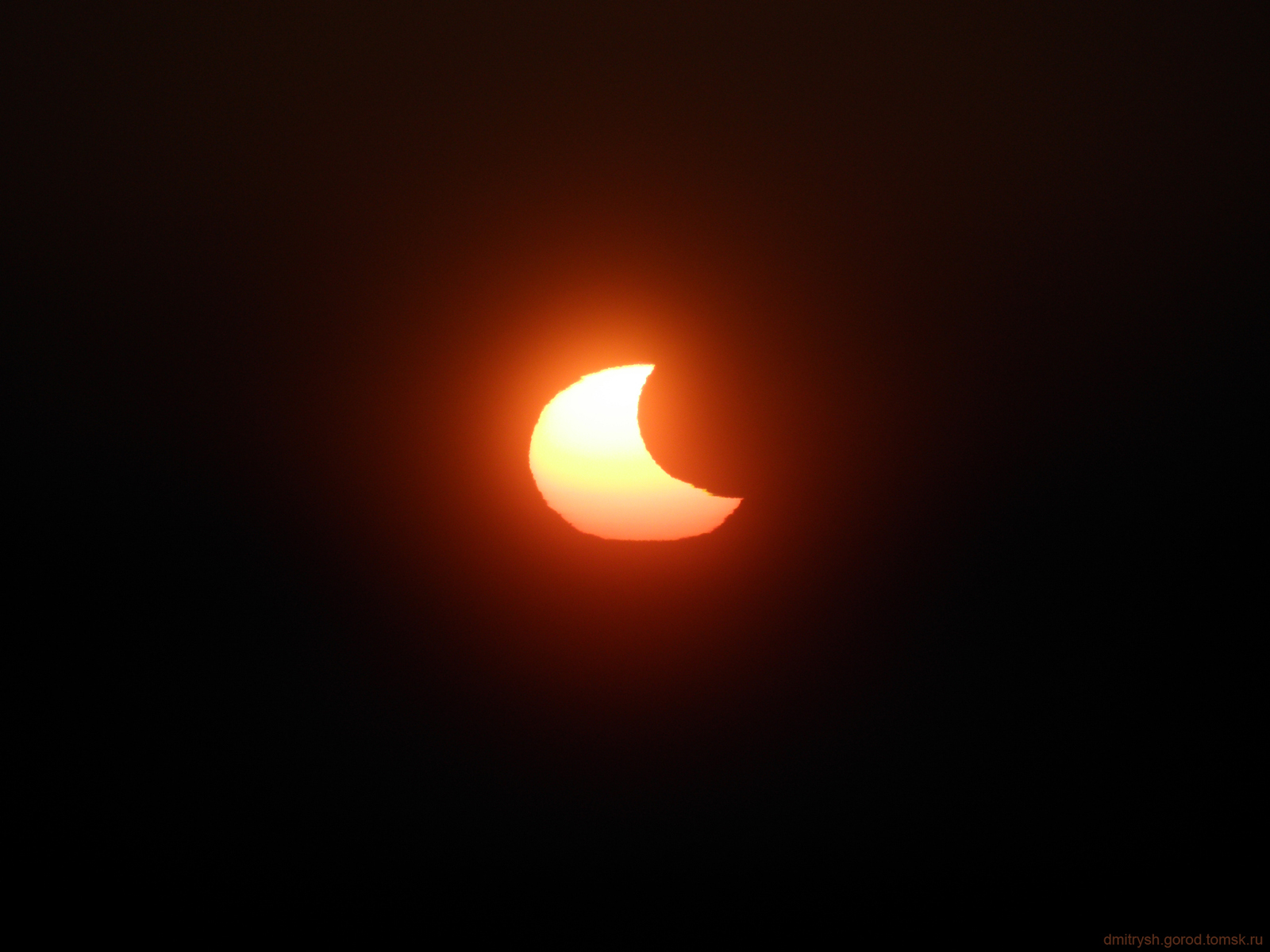
Tomsk, Russia at 8:44 UTC

Video from Moscow, Russia

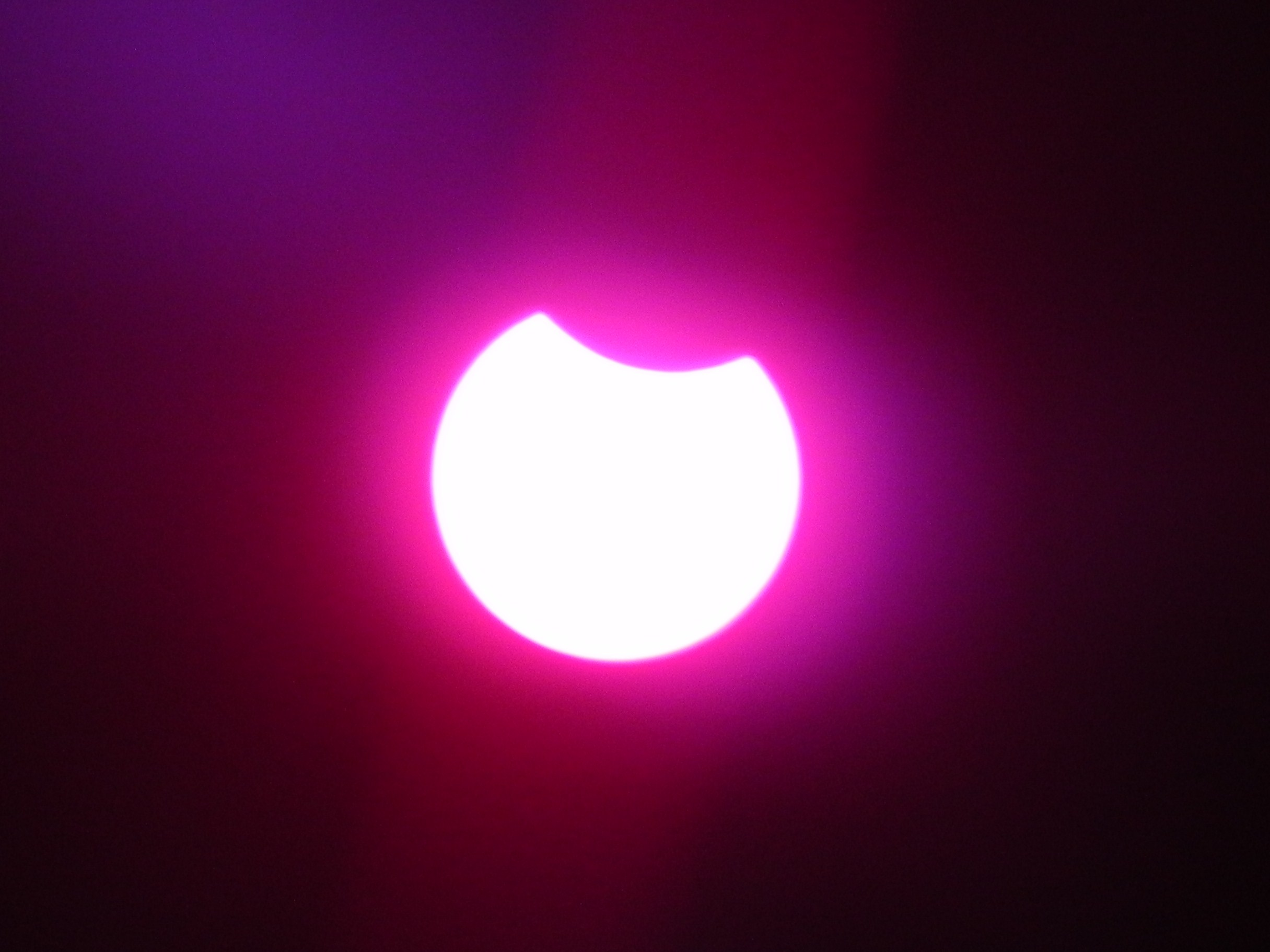
Sana'a, Yemen at 8:47 UTC

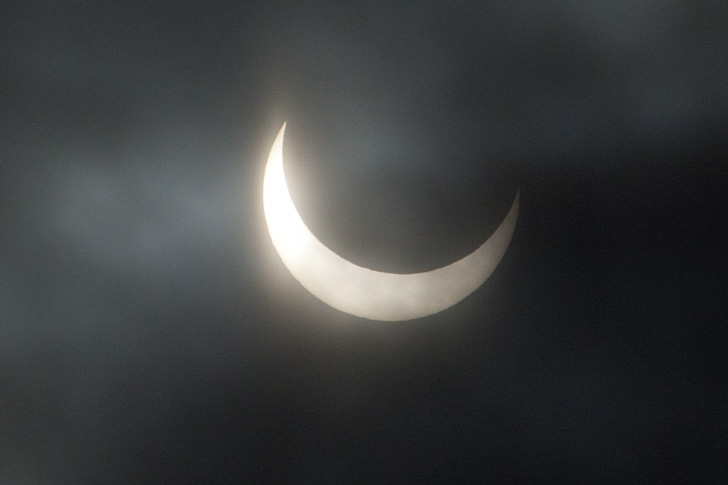
From Moscow, Russia at 9:02 UTC.

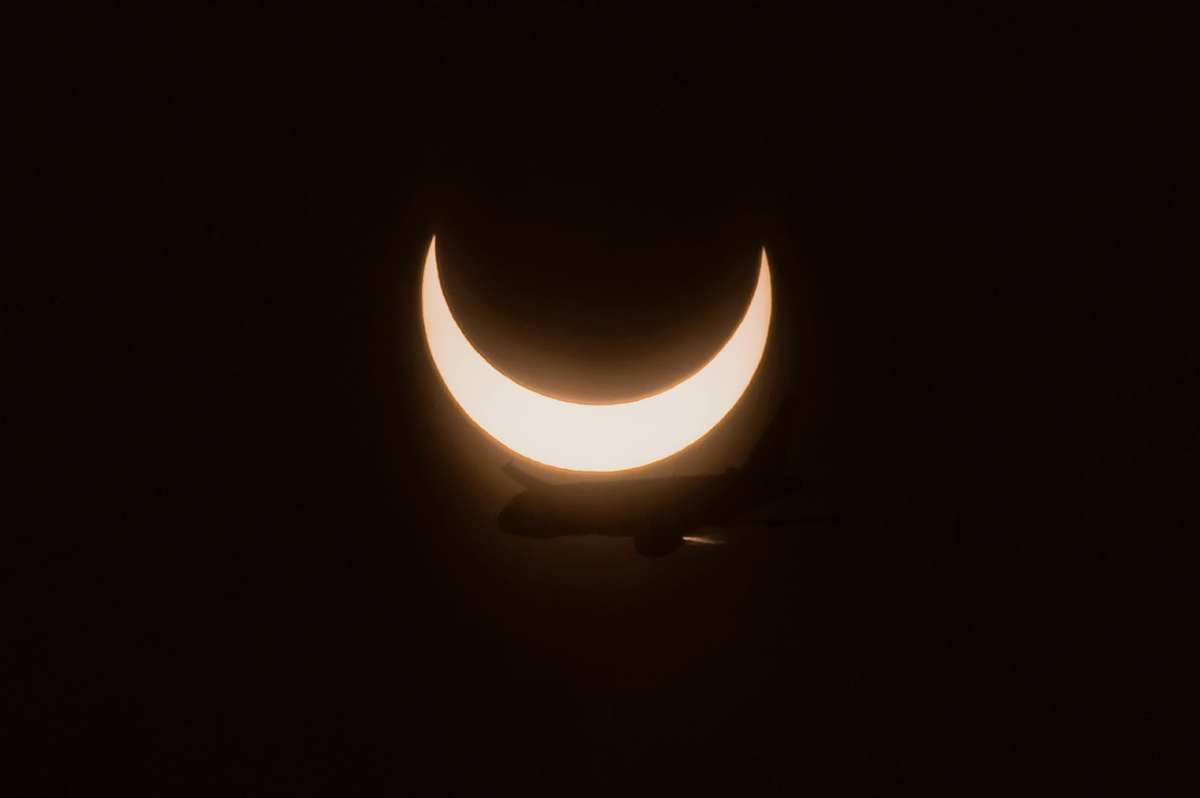
Eclipse and Airbus A319 in Moscow Oblast at 9:05 UTC

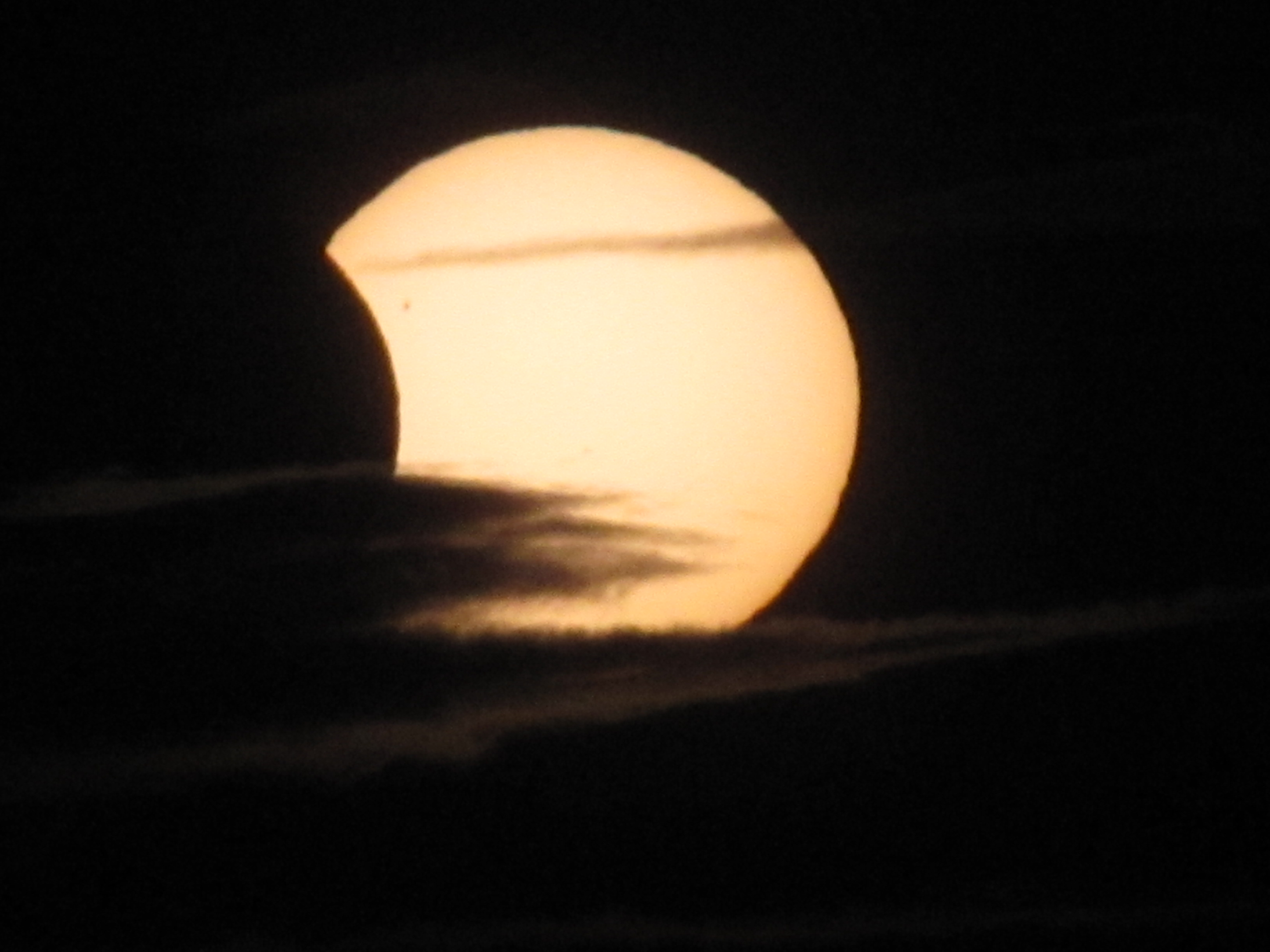
Kirkcaldy, Scotland at 9:14 UTC

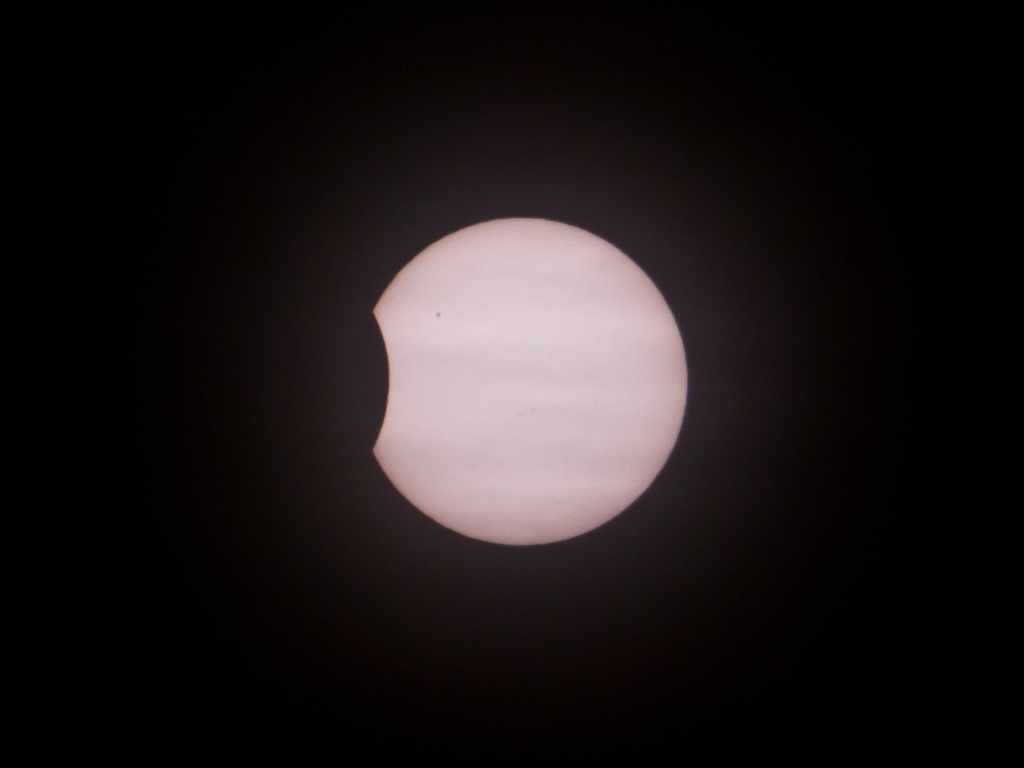
Haarlem, Netherlands, 9:29 UTC

== Eclipse details ==
Shown below are two tables displaying details about this particular solar eclipse. The first table outlines times at which the Moon's penumbra or umbra attains the specific parameter, and the second table describes various other parameters pertaining to this eclipse.

January 4, 2011 Solar Eclipse Times
Event	Time (UTC)
First Penumbral External Contact	2011 January 4 at 06:41:18.7 UTC
Greatest Eclipse	2011 January 4 at 08:51:42.4 UTC
Ecliptic Conjunction	2011 January 4 at 09:03:43.1 UTC
Equatorial Conjunction	2011 January 4 at 09:16:20.6 UTC
Last Penumbral External Contact	2011 January 4 at 11:02:01.4 UTC

January 4, 2011 Solar Eclipse Parameters
Parameter	Value
Eclipse Magnitude	0.85759
Eclipse Obscuration	0.79839
Gamma	1.06265
Sun Right Ascension	18h59m14.9s
Sun Declination	-22°44'21.1"
Sun Semi-Diameter	16'15.9"
Sun Equatorial Horizontal Parallax	08.9"
Moon Right Ascension	18h58m23.8s
Moon Declination	-21°46'01.2"
Moon Semi-Diameter	15'18.1"
Moon Equatorial Horizontal Parallax	0°56'09.6"
ΔT	66.3 s

== Eclipse season ==
This eclipse is part of an eclipse season, a period, roughly every six months, when eclipses occur. Only two (or occasionally three) eclipse seasons occur each year, and each season lasts about 35 days and repeats just short of six months (173 days) later; thus two full eclipse seasons always occur each year. Either two or three eclipses happen each eclipse season. In the sequence below, each eclipse is separated by a fortnight.

Eclipse season of December 2010–January 2011
December 21 Descending node (full moon)	January 4 Ascending node (new moon)
Total lunar eclipse Lunar Saros 125	Partial solar eclipse Solar Saros 151

== Related eclipses ==
=== Eclipses in 2011 ===
- A partial solar eclipse on January 4.
- A partial solar eclipse on June 1.
- A total lunar eclipse on June 15.
- A partial solar eclipse on July 1.
- A partial solar eclipse on November 25.
- A total lunar eclipse on December 10.

=== Metonic ===
- Preceded by: Solar eclipse of March 19, 2007
- Followed by: Solar eclipse of October 23, 2014

=== Tzolkinex ===
- Preceded by: Solar eclipse of November 23, 2003
- Followed by: Solar eclipse of February 15, 2018

=== Half-Saros ===
- Preceded by: Lunar eclipse of December 30, 2001
- Followed by: Lunar eclipse of January 10, 2020

=== Tritos ===
- Preceded by: Solar eclipse of February 5, 2000
- Followed by: Solar eclipse of December 4, 2021

=== Solar Saros 151 ===
- Preceded by: Solar eclipse of December 24, 1992
- Followed by: Solar eclipse of January 14, 2029

=== Inex ===
- Preceded by: Solar eclipse of January 25, 1982
- Followed by: Solar eclipse of December 15, 2039

=== Triad ===
- Preceded by: Solar eclipse of March 5, 1924
- Followed by: Solar eclipse of November 4, 2097

=== Solar eclipses of 2008–2011 ===
This eclipse is a member of a semester series. An eclipse in a semester series of solar eclipses repeats approximately every 177 days and 4 hours (a semester) at alternating nodes of the Moon's orbit.

The partial solar eclipses on June 1, 2011 and November 25, 2011 occur in the next lunar year eclipse set.

Solar eclipse series sets from 2008 to 2011
Ascending node			Descending node		
Saros	Map	Gamma	Saros	Map	Gamma
121 Partial in Christchurch, New Zealand	February 7, 2008 Annular	−0.95701	126 Totality in Kumul, Xinjiang, China	August 1, 2008 Total	0.83070
131 Annularity in Palangka Raya, Indonesia	January 26, 2009 Annular	−0.28197	136 Totality in Kurigram District, Bangladesh	July 22, 2009 Total	0.06977
141 Annularity in Jinan, Shandong, China	January 15, 2010 Annular	0.40016	146 Totality in Hao, French Polynesia	July 11, 2010 Total	−0.67877
151 Partial in Poland	January 4, 2011 Partial	1.06265	156	July 1, 2011 Partial	−1.49171

=== Saros 151 ===
This eclipse is a part of Saros series 151, repeating every 18 years, 11 days, and containing 72 events. The series started with a partial solar eclipse on August 14, 1776. It contains annular eclipses from February 28, 2101 through April 23, 2191; a hybrid eclipse on May 5, 2209; and total eclipses from May 16, 2227 through July 6, 2912. The series ends at member 72 as a partial eclipse on October 1, 3056. Its eclipses are tabulated in three columns; every third eclipse in the same column is one exeligmos apart, so they all cast shadows over approximately the same parts of the Earth.

The longest duration of annularity will be produced by member 19 at 2 minutes, 44 seconds on February 28, 2101, and the longest duration of totality will be produced by member 60 at 5 minutes, 41 seconds on May 22, 2840. All eclipses in this series occur at the Moon’s ascending node of orbit.

Series members 3–24 occur between 1801 and 2200:
3	4	5
September 5, 1812	September 17, 1830	September 27, 1848
6	7	8
October 8, 1866	October 19, 1884	October 31, 1902
9	10	11
November 10, 1920	November 21, 1938	December 2, 1956
12	13	14
December 13, 1974	December 24, 1992	January 4, 2011
15	16	17
January 14, 2029	January 26, 2047	February 5, 2065
18	19	20
February 16, 2083	February 28, 2101	March 11, 2119
21	22	23
March 21, 2137	April 2, 2155	April 12, 2173
24
April 23, 2191

=== Metonic series ===
The metonic series repeats eclipses every 19 years (6939.69 days), lasting about 5 cycles. Eclipses occur in nearly the same calendar date. In addition, the octon subseries repeats 1/5 of that or every 3.8 years (1387.94 days). All eclipses in this table occur at the Moon's ascending node.

22 eclipse events between January 5, 1935 and August 11, 2018
January 4–5	October 23–24	August 10–12	May 30–31	March 18–19
111	113	115	117	119
January 5, 1935		August 12, 1942	May 30, 1946	March 18, 1950
121	123	125	127	129
January 5, 1954	October 23, 1957	August 11, 1961	May 30, 1965	March 18, 1969
131	133	135	137	139
January 4, 1973	October 23, 1976	August 10, 1980	May 30, 1984	March 18, 1988
141	143	145	147	149
January 4, 1992	October 24, 1995	August 11, 1999	May 31, 2003	March 19, 2007
151	153	155		
January 4, 2011	October 23, 2014	August 11, 2018		

=== Tritos series ===
This eclipse is a part of a tritos cycle, repeating at alternating nodes every 135 synodic months (≈ 3986.63 days, or 11 years minus 1 month). Their appearance and longitude are irregular due to a lack of synchronization with the anomalistic month (period of perigee), but groupings of 3 tritos cycles (≈ 33 years minus 3 months) come close (≈ 434.044 anomalistic months), so eclipses are similar in these groupings.

Series members between 1801 and 2087
August 17, 1803 (Saros 132)	July 17, 1814 (Saros 133)	June 16, 1825 (Saros 134)	May 15, 1836 (Saros 135)	April 15, 1847 (Saros 136)
March 15, 1858 (Saros 137)	February 11, 1869 (Saros 138)	January 11, 1880 (Saros 139)	December 12, 1890 (Saros 140)	November 11, 1901 (Saros 141)
October 10, 1912 (Saros 142)	September 10, 1923 (Saros 143)	August 10, 1934 (Saros 144)	July 9, 1945 (Saros 145)	June 8, 1956 (Saros 146)
May 9, 1967 (Saros 147)	April 7, 1978 (Saros 148)	March 7, 1989 (Saros 149)	February 5, 2000 (Saros 150)	January 4, 2011 (Saros 151)
December 4, 2021 (Saros 152)	November 3, 2032 (Saros 153)	October 3, 2043 (Saros 154)	September 2, 2054 (Saros 155)	August 2, 2065 (Saros 156)
July 1, 2076 (Saros 157)	June 1, 2087 (Saros 158)			

=== Inex series ===
This eclipse is a part of the long period inex cycle, repeating at alternating nodes, every 358 synodic months (≈ 10,571.95 days, or 29 years minus 20 days). Their appearance and longitude are irregular due to a lack of synchronization with the anomalistic month (period of perigee). However, groupings of 3 inex cycles (≈ 87 years minus 2 months) comes close (≈ 1,151.02 anomalistic months), so eclipses are similar in these groupings.

Series members between 1801 and 2200
May 25, 1808 (Saros 144)	May 4, 1837 (Saros 145)	April 15, 1866 (Saros 146)
March 26, 1895 (Saros 147)	March 5, 1924 (Saros 148)	February 14, 1953 (Saros 149)
January 24, 1982 (Saros 150)	January 4, 2011 (Saros 151)	December 15, 2039 (Saros 152)
November 24, 2068 (Saros 153)	November 4, 2097 (Saros 154)	October 16, 2126 (Saros 155)
September 26, 2155 (Saros 156)	September 4, 2184 (Saros 157)	
