= Solar eclipse of August 12, 1942 =

20th-century partial solar eclipse

- Partial eclipse
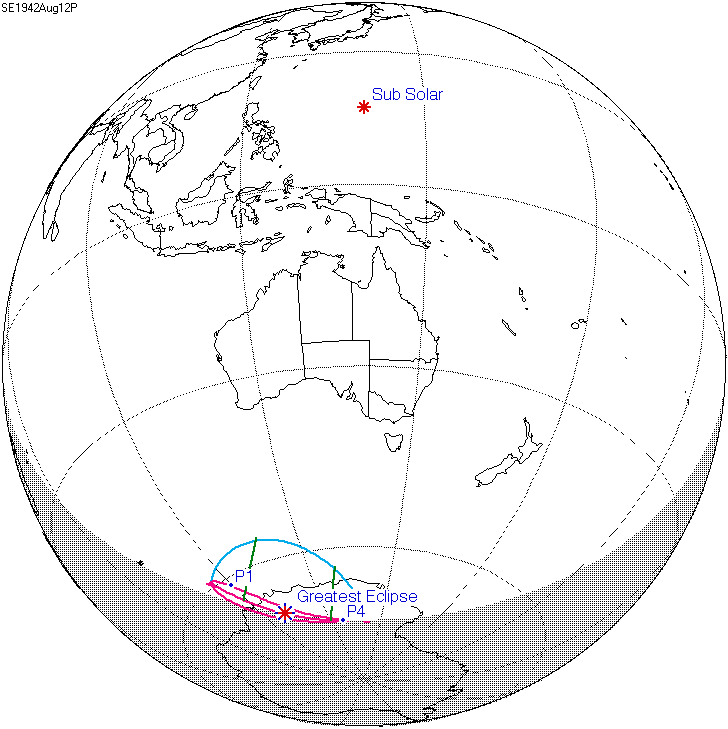
- Map
- Gamma: −1.5244
- Magnitude: 0.0561

Maximum eclipse
- Coordinates: 70.4°S 99.9°E

Times (UTC)
- Greatest eclipse: 2:45:12

References
- Saros: 115 (72 of 72)
- Catalog # (SE5000): 9381

A partial solar eclipse occurred at the Moon's ascending node of orbit on Wednesday, August 12, 1942, with a magnitude of 0.0561. A solar eclipse occurs when the Moon passes between Earth and the Sun, thereby totally or partly obscuring the image of the Sun for a viewer on Earth. A partial solar eclipse occurs in the polar regions of the Earth when the center of the Moon's shadow misses the Earth.

A partial eclipse was visible for parts of Antarctica. This was the last of 72 solar eclipses in Solar Saros 115.

== Eclipse details ==
Shown below are two tables displaying details about this particular solar eclipse. The first table outlines times at which the Moon's penumbra or umbra attains the specific parameter, and the second table describes various other parameters pertaining to this eclipse.

August 12, 1942 Solar Eclipse Times
Event	Time (UTC)
First Penumbral External Contact	1942 August 12 at 02:08:33.6 UTC
Ecliptic Conjunction	1942 August 12 at 02:28:04.4 UTC
Greatest Eclipse	1942 August 12 at 02:45:11.6 UTC
Last Penumbral External Contact	1942 August 12 at 03:21:27.7 UTC
Equatorial Conjunction	1942 August 12 at 03:24:16.4 UTC

August 12, 1942 Solar Eclipse Parameters
Parameter	Value
Eclipse Magnitude	0.05620
Eclipse Obscuration	0.01566
Gamma	−1.52444
Sun Right Ascension	09h24m47.6s
Sun Declination	+15°12'09.3"
Sun Semi-Diameter	15'47.0"
Sun Equatorial Horizontal Parallax	08.7"
Moon Right Ascension	09h23m32.6s
Moon Declination	+13°50'08.2"
Moon Semi-Diameter	15'03.2"
Moon Equatorial Horizontal Parallax	0°55'14.6"
ΔT	25.5 s

== Eclipse season ==
This eclipse is part of an eclipse season, a period, roughly every six months, when eclipses occur. Only two (or occasionally three) eclipse seasons occur each year, and each season lasts about 35 days and repeats just short of six months (173 days) later; thus two full eclipse seasons always occur each year. Either two or three eclipses happen each eclipse season. In the sequence below, each eclipse is separated by a fortnight. The first and last eclipse in this sequence is separated by one synodic month.

Eclipse season of August–September 1942
August 12 Ascending node (new moon)	August 26 Descending node (full moon)	September 10 Ascending node (new moon)
Partial solar eclipse Solar Saros 115	Total lunar eclipse Lunar Saros 127	Partial solar eclipse Solar Saros 153

== Related eclipses ==
=== Eclipses in 1942 ===
- A total lunar eclipse on March 3.
- A partial solar eclipse on March 16.
- A partial solar eclipse on August 12.
- A total lunar eclipse on August 26.
- A partial solar eclipse on September 10.

=== Metonic ===
- Followed by: Solar eclipse of May 30, 1946

=== Tzolkinex ===
- Preceded by: Solar eclipse of June 30, 1935

=== Half-Saros ===
- Preceded by: Lunar eclipse of August 5, 1933
- Followed by: Lunar eclipse of August 17, 1951

=== Tritos ===
- Preceded by: Solar eclipse of September 12, 1931
- Followed by: Solar eclipse of July 11, 1953

=== Solar Saros 115 ===
- Preceded by: Solar eclipse of July 31, 1924

=== Inex ===
- Preceded by: Solar eclipse of August 31, 1913
- Followed by: Solar eclipse of July 22, 1971

=== Triad ===
- Followed by: Solar eclipse of June 12, 2029

=== Solar eclipses of 1942–1946 ===
This eclipse is a member of a semester series. An eclipse in a semester series of solar eclipses repeats approximately every 177 days and 4 hours (a semester) at alternating nodes of the Moon's orbit.

The partial solar eclipses on March 16, 1942 and September 10, 1942 occur in the previous lunar year eclipse set, and the partial solar eclipses on May 30, 1946 and November 23, 1946 occur in the next lunar year eclipse set.

Solar eclipse series sets from 1942 to 1946
Ascending node			Descending node		
Saros	Map	Gamma	Saros	Map	Gamma
115	August 12, 1942 Partial	−1.5244	120	February 4, 1943 Total	0.8734
125	August 1, 1943 Annular	−0.8041	130	January 25, 1944 Total	0.2025
135	July 20, 1944 Annular	−0.0314	140	January 14, 1945 Annular	−0.4937
145	July 9, 1945 Total	0.7356	150	January 3, 1946 Partial	−1.2392
155	June 29, 1946 Partial	1.4361			

=== Saros 115 ===
This eclipse is a part of Saros series 115, repeating every 18 years, 11 days, and containing 72 events. The series started with a partial solar eclipse on June 21, 662 AD. It contains total eclipses from October 7, 842 AD through November 2, 1491; hybrid eclipses from November 12, 1509 through December 15, 1563; and annular eclipses from December 25, 1581 through May 27, 1816. The series ends at member 72 as a partial eclipse on August 12, 1942. Its eclipses are tabulated in three columns; every third eclipse in the same column is one exeligmos apart, so they all cast shadows over approximately the same parts of the Earth.

The longest duration of totality was produced by member 36 at 6 minutes, 24 seconds on July 5, 1293, and the longest duration of annularity was produced by member 65 at 1 minutes, 54 seconds on May 27, 1816. All eclipses in this series occur at the Moon’s ascending node of orbit.

Series members 65–72 occur between 1801 and 1942:
65	66	67
May 27, 1816	June 7, 1834	June 17, 1852
68	69	70
June 28, 1870	July 9, 1888	July 21, 1906
71	72	
July 31, 1924	August 12, 1942	

=== Metonic series ===
The metonic series repeats eclipses every 19 years (6939.69 days), lasting about 5 cycles. Eclipses occur in nearly the same calendar date. In addition, the octon subseries repeats 1/5 of that or every 3.8 years (1387.94 days). All eclipses in this table occur at the Moon's ascending node.

22 eclipse events between January 5, 1935 and August 11, 2018
January 4–5	October 23–24	August 10–12	May 30–31	March 18–19
111	113	115	117	119
January 5, 1935		August 12, 1942	May 30, 1946	March 18, 1950
121	123	125	127	129
January 5, 1954	October 23, 1957	August 11, 1961	May 30, 1965	March 18, 1969
131	133	135	137	139
January 4, 1973	October 23, 1976	August 10, 1980	May 30, 1984	March 18, 1988
141	143	145	147	149
January 4, 1992	October 24, 1995	August 11, 1999	May 31, 2003	March 19, 2007
151	153	155		
January 4, 2011	October 23, 2014	August 11, 2018		

=== Tritos series ===
This eclipse is a part of a tritos cycle, repeating at alternating nodes every 135 synodic months (≈ 3986.63 days, or 11 years minus 1 month). Their appearance and longitude are irregular due to a lack of synchronization with the anomalistic month (period of perigee), but groupings of 3 tritos cycles (≈ 33 years minus 3 months) come close (≈ 434.044 anomalistic months), so eclipses are similar in these groupings.

Series members between 1866 and 2200
March 16, 1866 (Saros 108)			December 13, 1898 (Saros 111)	
	September 12, 1931 (Saros 114)	August 12, 1942 (Saros 115)	July 11, 1953 (Saros 116)	June 10, 1964 (Saros 117)
May 11, 1975 (Saros 118)	April 9, 1986 (Saros 119)	March 9, 1997 (Saros 120)	February 7, 2008 (Saros 121)	January 6, 2019 (Saros 122)
December 5, 2029 (Saros 123)	November 4, 2040 (Saros 124)	October 4, 2051 (Saros 125)	September 3, 2062 (Saros 126)	August 3, 2073 (Saros 127)
July 3, 2084 (Saros 128)	June 2, 2095 (Saros 129)	May 3, 2106 (Saros 130)	April 2, 2117 (Saros 131)	March 1, 2128 (Saros 132)
January 30, 2139 (Saros 133)	December 30, 2149 (Saros 134)	November 27, 2160 (Saros 135)	October 29, 2171 (Saros 136)	September 27, 2182 (Saros 137)
August 26, 2193 (Saros 138)

=== Inex series ===
This eclipse is a part of the long period inex cycle, repeating at alternating nodes, every 358 synodic months (≈ 10,571.95 days, or 29 years minus 20 days). Their appearance and longitude are irregular due to a lack of synchronization with the anomalistic month (period of perigee). However, groupings of 3 inex cycles (≈ 87 years minus 2 months) comes close (≈ 1,151.02 anomalistic months), so eclipses are similar in these groupings.

Series members between 1801 and 2200
October 31, 1826 (Saros 111)		
August 31, 1913 (Saros 114)	August 12, 1942 (Saros 115)	July 22, 1971 (Saros 116)
July 1, 2000 (Saros 117)	June 12, 2029 (Saros 118)	May 22, 2058 (Saros 119)
May 2, 2087 (Saros 120)	April 13, 2116 (Saros 121)	March 23, 2145 (Saros 122)
March 3, 2174 (Saros 123)		

== See also ==
- Moon's orbit
