= Solar Saros 115 =

Saros cycle series 115 for solar eclipses

Historic saros cycle animation

Saros cycle series 115 for solar eclipses occurred at the Moon's ascending node, repeating every 18 years, 11 days, containing 72 eclipses, 55 of which were umbral (37 total, 4 hybrid, 14 annular). The first eclipse was on 21 June 662 and the last was on 12 August 1942. The longest totality was 6 minutes 24 seconds on 5 July 1293, the longest annular was 1 minute 54 seconds on 27 May 1816.

This solar saros is linked to Lunar Saros 108.

== Umbral eclipses ==
Umbral eclipses (annular, total and hybrid) can be further classified as either: 1) Central (two limits), 2) Central (one limit) or 3) Non-Central (one limit). The statistical distribution of these classes in Saros series 115 appears in the following table.

Classification	Number	Percent
All Umbral eclipses	55	100.00%
Central (two limits)	55	100.00%
Central (one limit)	0	0.00%
Non-central (one limit)	0	0.00%

== All eclipses ==
Note: Dates are given in the Julian calendar prior to 15 October 1582, and in the Gregorian calendar after that.

Saros	Member	Date	Time (Greatest) UTC	Type	Location Lat, Long	Gamma	Mag.	Width (km)	Duration (min:sec)	Ref
115	1	June 21, 662	15:58:36	Partial	66N 148.9E	1.5377	0.003			
115	2	July 1, 680	23:10:18	Partial	67N 29.8E	1.4605	0.1456			
115	3	July 13, 698	6:25:23	Partial	68N 90.6W	1.3851	0.2855			
115	4	July 23, 716	13:47:09	Partial	68.9N 146.8E	1.314	0.418			
115	5	August 3, 734	21:14:27	Partial	69.9N 22.2E	1.2467	0.5437			
115	6	August 14, 752	4:50:37	Partial	70.7N 105.2W	1.1859	0.6576			
115	7	August 25, 770	12:34:31	Partial	71.3N 125E	1.1309	0.7603			
115	8	September 4, 788	20:26:59	Partial	71.8N 7.6W	1.0824	0.8508			
115	9	September 16, 806	4:28:29	Partial	72N 142.7W	1.0409	0.9284			
115	10	September 26, 824	12:39:01	Partial	71.9N 79.8E	1.0062	0.9929			
115	11	October 7, 842	20:58:30	Total	65.2N 84.3W	0.9787	1.0229	403	1m 30s	
115	12	October 18, 860	5:25:02	Total	58.5N 134E	0.9565	1.0241	286	1m 42s	
115	13	October 29, 878	13:59:59	Total	53.5N 3.7W	0.9411	1.0246	250	1m 50s	
115	14	November 8, 896	22:40:33	Total	49.5N 140.8W	0.9297	1.0251	234	1m 57s	
115	15	November 20, 914	7:26:39	Total	46.5N 81.8E	0.9225	1.0258	229	2m 4s	
115	16	November 30, 932	16:15:34	Total	44.3N 55.9W	0.9174	1.0267	230	2m 12s	
115	17	December 12, 950	1:07:14	Total	42.9N 166.1E	0.9143	1.0281	237	2m 19s	
115	18	December 22, 968	9:58:17	Total	41.8N 28.3E	0.9105	1.03	246	2m 28s	
115	19	January 2, 987	18:48:09	Total	41.2N 108.9W	0.9056	1.0323	257	2m 37s	
115	20	January 13, 1005	3:34:49	Total	40.7N 115.1E	0.8978	1.0352	267	2m 48s	
115	21	January 24, 1023	12:18:00	Total	40.5N 19.7W	0.8869	1.0385	276	3m 0s	
115	22	February 3, 1041	20:54:13	Total	40.4N 152W	0.8704	1.0424	283	3m 13s	
115	23	February 15, 1059	5:24:50	Total	40.6N 77.7E	0.8492	1.0465	287	3m 26s	
115	24	February 25, 1077	13:47:25	Total	41N 49.7W	0.8214	1.051	290	3m 40s	
115	25	March 8, 1095	22:03:57	Total	41.8N 174.8W	0.7883	1.0553	291	3m 54s	
115	26	March 19, 1113	6:10:38	Total	42.7N 63.6E	0.7471	1.0598	290	4m 8s	
115	27	March 30, 1131	14:11:49	Total	43.9N 55.8W	0.7012	1.0639	289	4m 22s	
115	28	April 9, 1149	22:04:02	Total	44.9N 171.9W	0.6479	1.0676	286	4m 38s	
115	29	April 21, 1167	5:51:40	Total	45.8N 73.9E	0.5906	1.0709	284	4m 53s	
115	30	May 1, 1185	13:30:57	Total	46N 37.2W	0.5264	1.0736	280	5m 10s	
115	31	May 12, 1203	21:07:30	Total	45.5N 147.2W	0.4596	1.0755	275	5m 26s	
115	32	May 23, 1221	4:38:19	Total	43.9N 104.3E	0.3885	1.0767	269	5m 43s	
115	33	June 3, 1239	12:07:17	Total	41.3N 4.2W	0.3157	1.0771	263	5m 58s	
115	34	June 13, 1257	19:33:21	Total	37.6N 112.8W	0.2409	1.0765	255	6m 11s	
115	35	June 25, 1275	2:59:56	Total	33N 137.5E	0.1668	1.0752	247	6m 21s	
115	36	July 5, 1293	10:26:45	Total	27.5N 26.7E	0.0933	1.073	238	6m 24s	
115	37	July 16, 1311	17:55:04	Total	21.4N 85.4W	0.0216	1.07	228	6m 20s	
115	38	July 27, 1329	1:26:16	Total	14.9N 160.9E	-0.0471	1.0662	217	6m 8s	
115	39	August 7, 1347	9:01:38	Total	8.1N 45.7E	-0.1116	1.0618	204	5m 48s	
115	40	August 17, 1365	16:41:46	Total	1.1N 71.2W	-0.1716	1.0569	190	5m 22s	
115	41	August 29, 1383	0:27:38	Total	5.9S 170.2E	-0.2262	1.0516	175	4m 50s	
115	42	September 8, 1401	8:20:21	Total	12.8S 49.9E	-0.2746	1.0459	159	4m 15s	
115	43	September 19, 1419	16:20:21	Total	19.5S 72.1W	-0.3162	1.0401	141	3m 40s	
115	44	September 30, 1437	0:26:45	Total	25.9S 164.7E	-0.3519	1.0343	123	3m 5s	
115	45	October 11, 1455	8:40:44	Total	31.8S 40.2E	-0.3809	1.0286	104	2m 31s	
115	46	October 21, 1473	17:01:28	Total	37.3S 85.1W	-0.404	1.023	86	2m 0s	
115	47	November 2, 1491	1:28:47	Total	42S 148.9E	-0.4209	1.0179	68	1m 32s	
115	48	November 12, 1509	10:00:15	Hybrid	45.8S 23.2E	-0.4338	1.0131	50	1m 6s	
115	49	November 23, 1527	18:36:38	Hybrid	48.6S 102.5W	-0.4422	1.0089	34	0m 45s	
115	50	December 4, 1545	3:15:42	Hybrid	50.1S 132.1E	-0.448	1.0051	20	0m 25s	
115	51	December 15, 1563	11:55:49	Hybrid	50.3S 6.8E	-0.4524	1.002	8	0m 10s	
115	52	December 25, 1581	20:35:20	Annular	49.4S 118.5W	-0.4567	0.9993	3	0m 4s	
115	53	January 16, 1600	5:12:46	Annular	47.4S 115.9E	-0.4623	0.9972	11	0m 14s	
115	54	January 26, 1618	13:46:44	Annular	44.7S 9.7W	-0.47	0.9955	18	0m 23s	
115	55	February 6, 1636	22:14:33	Annular	41.6S 134.7W	-0.4825	0.9943	23	0m 29s	
115	56	February 17, 1654	6:36:38	Annular	38.3S 100.9E	-0.4991	0.9933	27	0m 34s	
115	57	February 28, 1672	14:50:43	Annular	35.2S 22W	-0.5218	0.9926	30	0m 38s	
115	58	March 10, 1690	22:56:00	Annular	32.5S 143W	-0.5512	0.992	33	0m 42s	
115	59	March 22, 1708	6:51:37	Annular	30.4S 98.3E	-0.5879	0.9913	37	0m 46s	
115	60	April 2, 1726	14:38:16	Annular	29.2S 18.3W	-0.6313	0.9906	42	0m 52s	
115	61	April 12, 1744	22:15:24	Annular	29.1S 132.6W	-0.6819	0.9895	49	0m 59s	
115	62	April 24, 1762	5:42:10	Annular	30.3S 115.6E	-0.7402	0.9881	61	1m 8s	
115	63	May 4, 1780	13:00:42	Annular	33.3S 5.9E	-0.8043	0.9861	81	1m 21s	
115	64	May 15, 1798	20:10:32	Annular	38.6S 101.6W	-0.8744	0.9832	121	1m 36s	
115	65	May 27, 1816	3:13:24	Annular	48S 153.5E	-0.9492	0.9791	238	1m 54s	
115	66	June 7, 1834	10:08:38	Partial	64.6S 55.4E	-1.0291	0.9295			
115	67	June 17, 1852	16:59:50	Partial	65.6S 57.3W	-1.1111	0.7828			
115	68	June 28, 1870	23:46:43	Partial	66.6S 169.4W	-1.1949	0.6335			
115	69	July 9, 1888	6:30:52	Partial	67.6S 78.8E	-1.2797	0.4832			
115	70	July 21, 1906	13:14:19	Partial	68.6S 33.3W	-1.3637	0.3355			
115	71	July 31, 1924	19:58:20	Partial	69.6S 146W	-1.4459	0.192			
115	72	August 12, 1942	2:45:12	Partial	70.4S 99.9E	-1.5244	0.0561			
