= Solar eclipse of May 1, 1185 =

Total eclipse

- Total eclipse
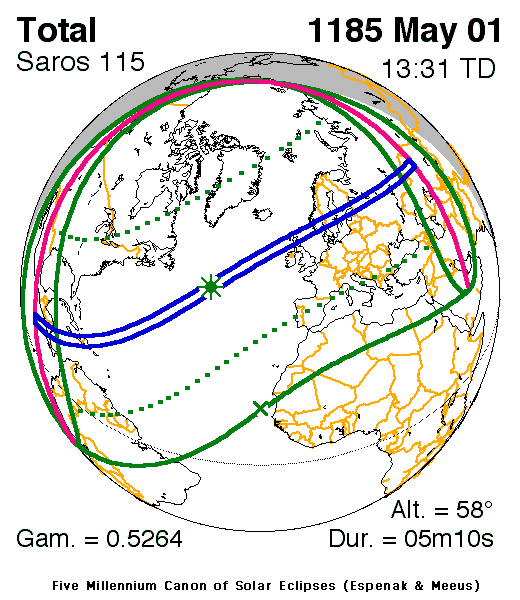
- Solar eclipse of May 1, 1185
- Gamma: 0.5264
- Magnitude: 1.0736

Maximum eclipse
- Duration: 310 s (5m 10s)
- Coordinates: 46.000°N 37.200°W
- Max. width of band: 280 km (170 mi)

Times (UTC)
- Greatest eclipse: 13:30:57

References
- Saros: 115 (30 of 72)

A total solar eclipse was visible on May 1, 1185 in Central America, Northern Europe, Eastern Europe, and Kazakhstan. The eclipse is number 30 in the Solar Saros 115 series. The eclipse shadow on the Earth's surface was at its greatest at 13:18:02 Universal Time. The sun was in Taurus at this time. The eclipse was documented in Tale of Igor's Campaign and the Laurentian Codex, and possibly the Chronicle of Melrose and the Brut y Tywysogion. It may have influenced Igor Svyatoslavich's campaign against the Polovtsians.

== Eclipse path ==
The shadow axis passed between the Earth's center and the north pole. The minimum distance from the center of the Earth to the Moon's shadow cone axis was 3,357 kilometers. The average length of the Moon's shadow was 373,320 kilometers. The distance from the Earth to the Moon on 1 May 1185 was 347,727 kilometers. The apparent diameter of the Moon was 1.0736 times that of the Sun. The shadow had a maximum width of 280 kilometers. It began on the west coast of Central America and crossed the Atlantic Ocean in a northeasterly direction. The shadow passed through present-day Nicaragua and Haiti. The maximum duration of the eclipse occurred in the middle of the North Atlantic at coordinates 46°N, 37.2°W. The maximum duration of totality was 5 minutes and 10 seconds. The eclipse magnitude is 1.0736. The eclipse was preceded two weeks earlier by a partial lunar eclipse on April 16.

A partial eclipse came ashore in Scotland, crossed the North Sea, and entered Norway. According to astronomer Sheridan Williams, there was probably a drop in temperature at the time of the eclipse, around 2 pm in Scotland. He says that it was Scotland's fifth longest total eclipse at 4 minutes and 40 seconds. Williams also notes that some older observers in Scotland may have also witnessed the previous eclipse, 52 years earlier.

After passing through present-day Sweden, the eclipse touched a part of Finland and covered the northern part of the Baltic Sea at the Gulf of Finland. The eclipse then entered Russia. The eclipse's shadow touched part of what would be St. Petersburg, as well as Novgorod and Rostov. As the shadow journeyed in a southeasterly direction, it passed through the modern sites of Nizhny Novgorod, Kazan, Ufa, and Magnitogorsk. The eclipse shadow started diminishing when it entered present-day Kazakhstan and extinguished completely about 30 miles before reaching Astana.

== In literature ==
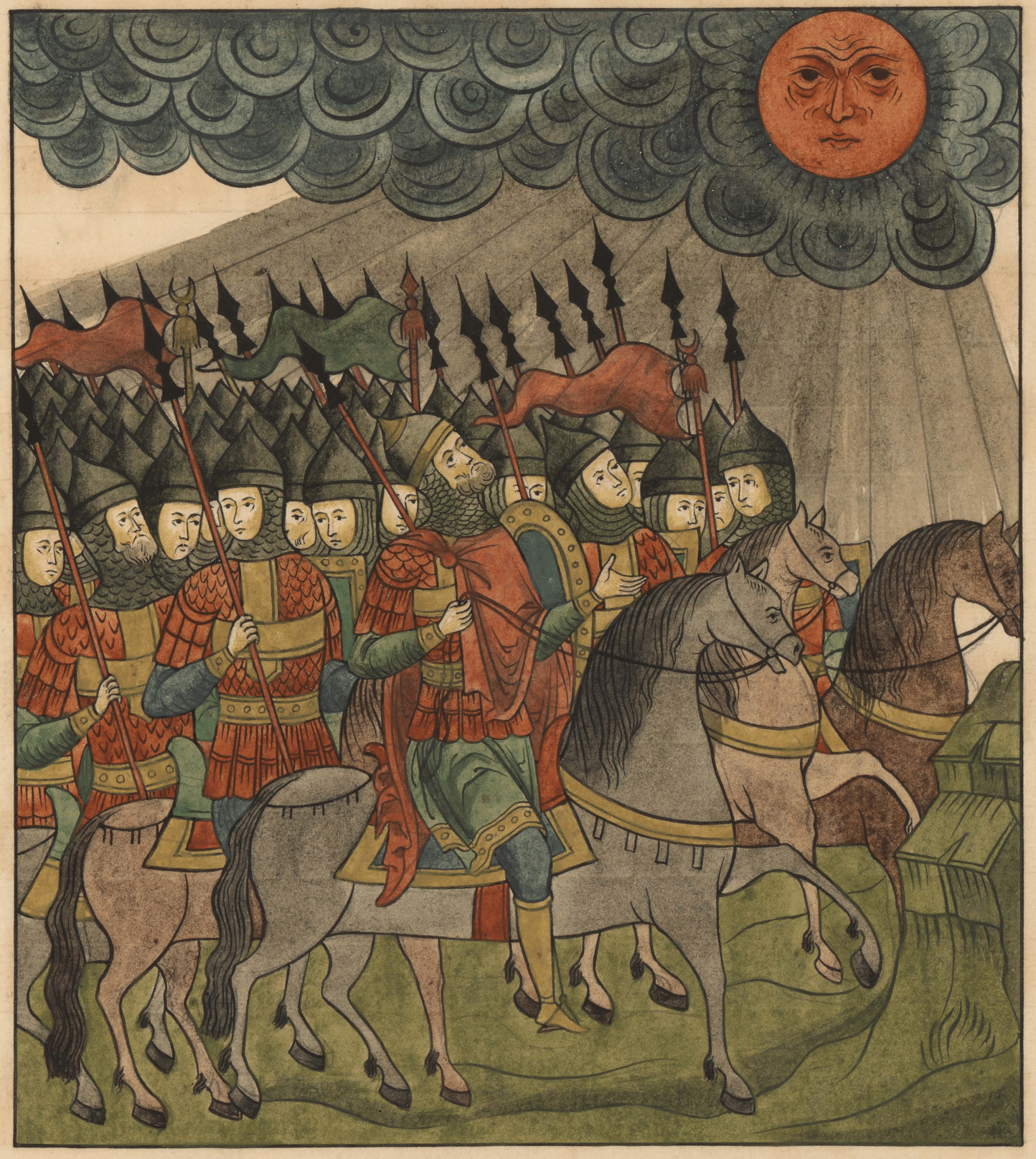
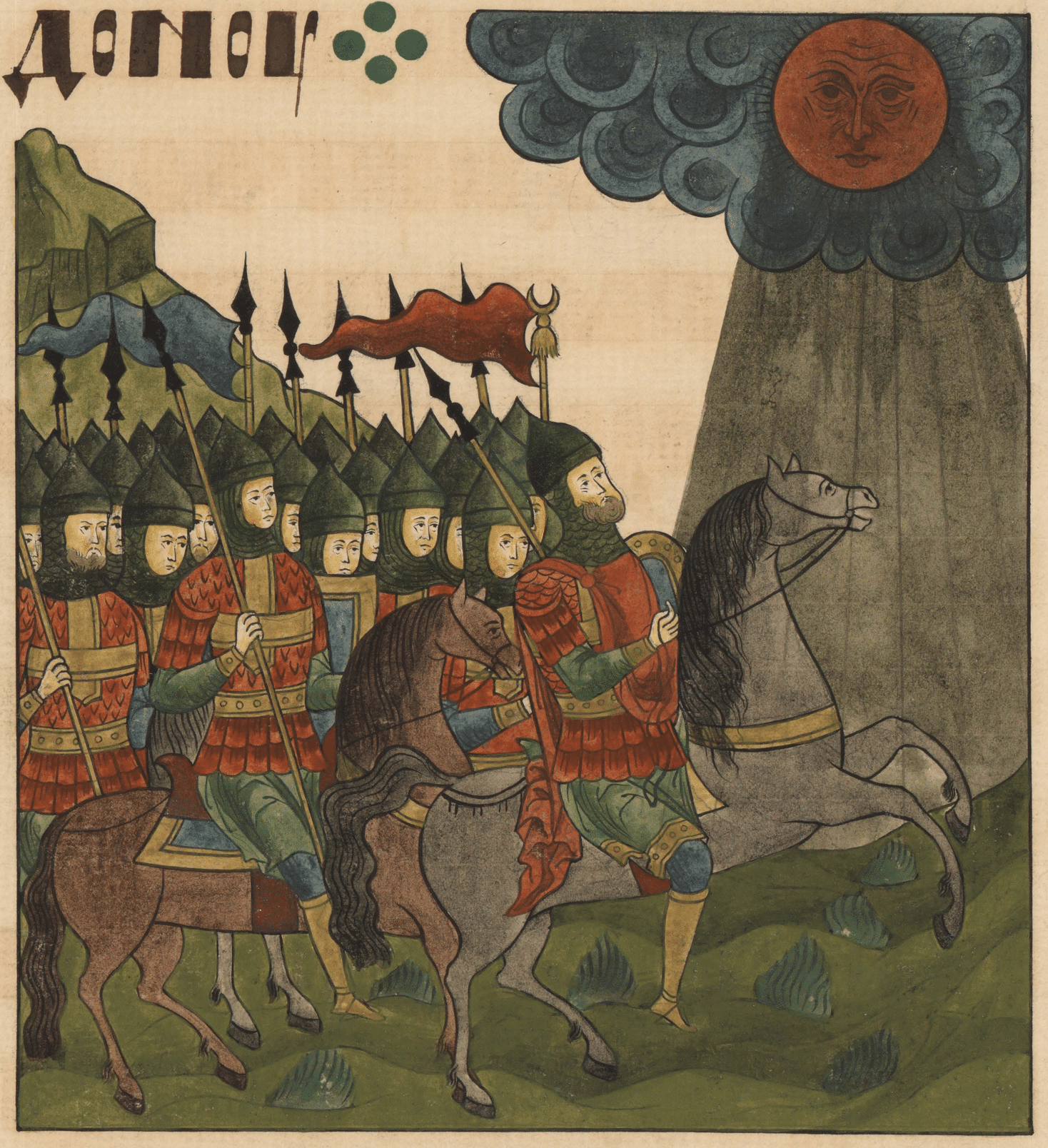
The sun dimming on Igor's campaign, as illustrated by Ivan Blinov (1912) in the first artistic representation of the epic.

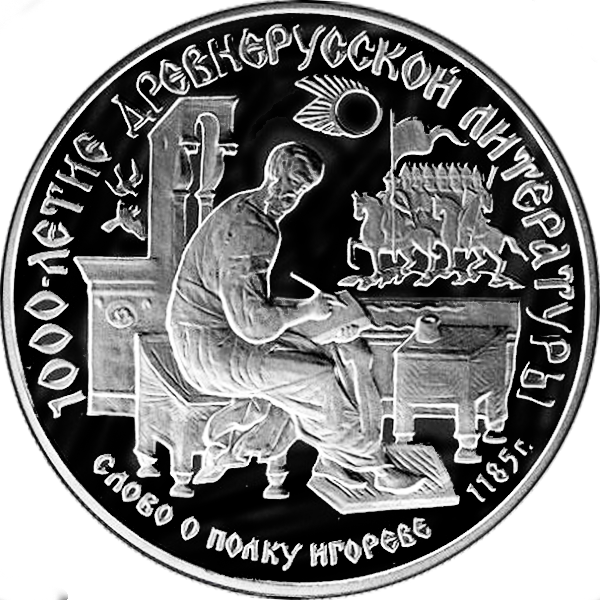
Soviet 150 ruble commemorative coin depicting the eclipse

The eclipse was mentioned in the Kievan Rus' epic poem Lay of the Host of Igor. It was seen by Prince Igor Svyatoslavich and his army whilst on their campaign against the Polovtsians, and was interpreted as a message from God prophesying trouble, frightening Igor's men who thought it a bad omen. According to the Lay, after the eclipse Igor gave a long speech to his retinue to allay their fears before proceeding on his campaign.

The eclipse is mentioned in the 14th-century Laurentian Chronicle with the first detailed description of solar prominences. They were described as flame-like tongues of live embers:

On the first day of the month of May, on the day of the Saint Prophet Jeremiah, on Wednesday, during the evening service, there was a sign in the Sun. It became very dark, even the stars could be seen; it seemed to men as if everything were green, and the Sun became like a crescent of the Moon, from the horns of which a glow similar to that of red-hot charcoals was emanating. It was terrible to see this sign of the Lord.

The Melrose Chronicle claims that "stars appeared" at Melrose in Scotland during the eclipse of 1185, but this is doubted by the writer Thomas Cooper, who notes that scientific calculations indicate that the eclipse was not total at Melrose.

The Brut y Tywysogion, the Welsh Chronicle of the Princes, says of the solar eclipse of 1 May 1185, Yn y ulwyddyn honno dyw Calan Mei y sumudawd yr heul y lliw; ac y dywat rei uot anei diffyc, which translates as: In that year on the day of the Calends of May the Sun changed its colour; and some said that it was under an eclipse. Bryn Jones believes there was a total solar eclipse across the Scottish Highlands, the Western Isles and Orkney.
