= Solar eclipse of August 11, 2018 =

21st-century partial solar eclipse

- Partial eclipse
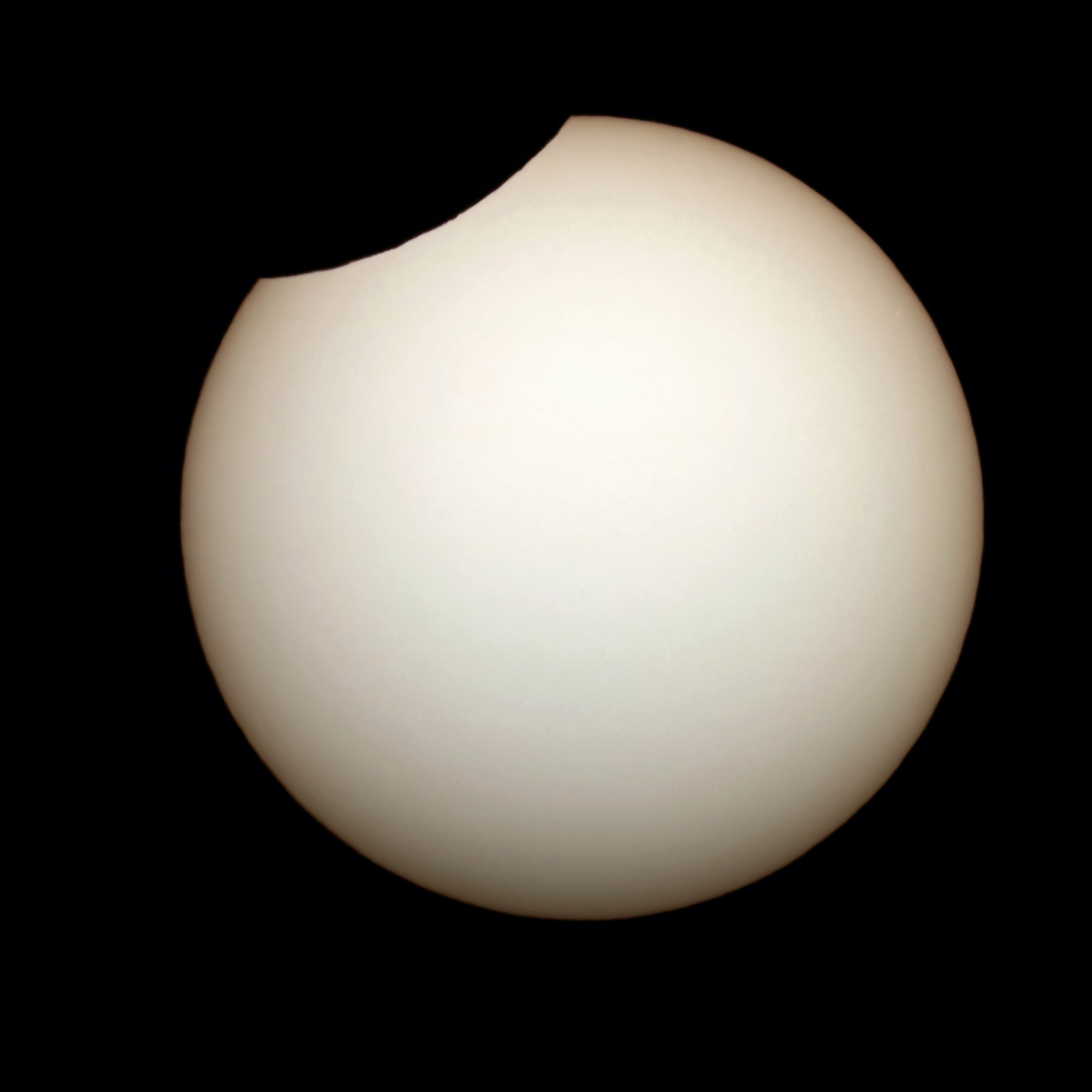
- From Huittinen, Finland

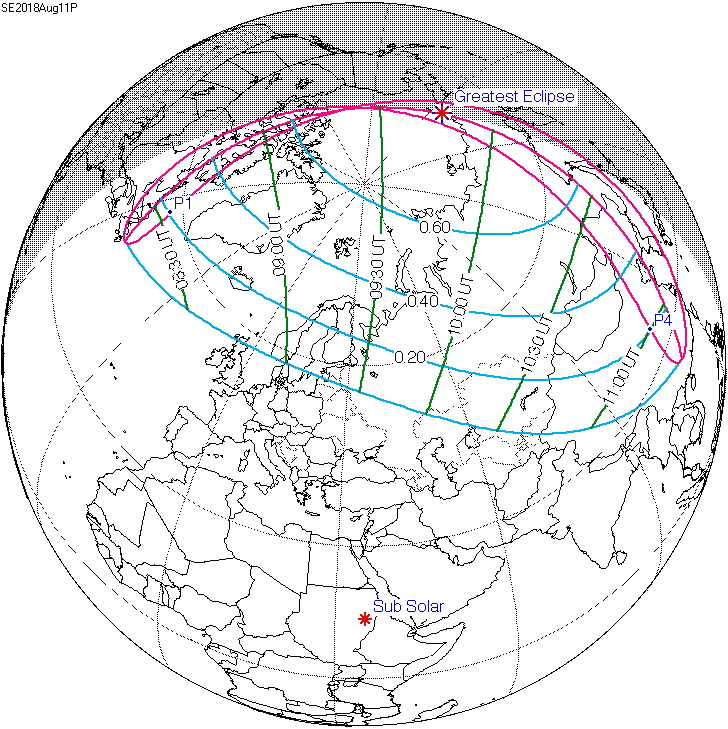
- Map
- Gamma: 1.1476
- Magnitude: 0.7368

Maximum eclipse
- Coordinates: 70.4°N 174.5°E

Times (UTC)
- Greatest eclipse: 9:47:28

References
- Saros: 155 (6 of 71)
- Catalog # (SE5000): 9549

A partial solar eclipse occurred at the Moon's ascending node of orbit on Saturday, August 11, 2018, with a magnitude of 0.7368. A solar eclipse occurs when the Moon passes between Earth and the Sun, thereby totally or partly obscuring the image of the Sun for a viewer on Earth. A partial solar eclipse occurs in the polar regions of the Earth when the center of the Moon's shadow misses the Earth.

The eclipse was visible in northeastern Canada, Greenland, Northern Europe, and northern Asia.

== Visibility ==
Animated path.

The maximal phase of the partial eclipse was recorded in the East Siberian Sea, near Wrangel Island.

The eclipse was observed in Canada, Greenland, Scotland, most of the Nordic countries (Iceland, Norway, Sweden, Finland), Estonia, Latvia, practically throughout Russia (except for places southwest of the line roughly passing through Pskov, Moscow and Penza, and the most eastern places of the Far East), in Kazakhstan, Kyrgyzstan, Mongolia and China. During sunset, the eclipse was observed in North and South Korea.

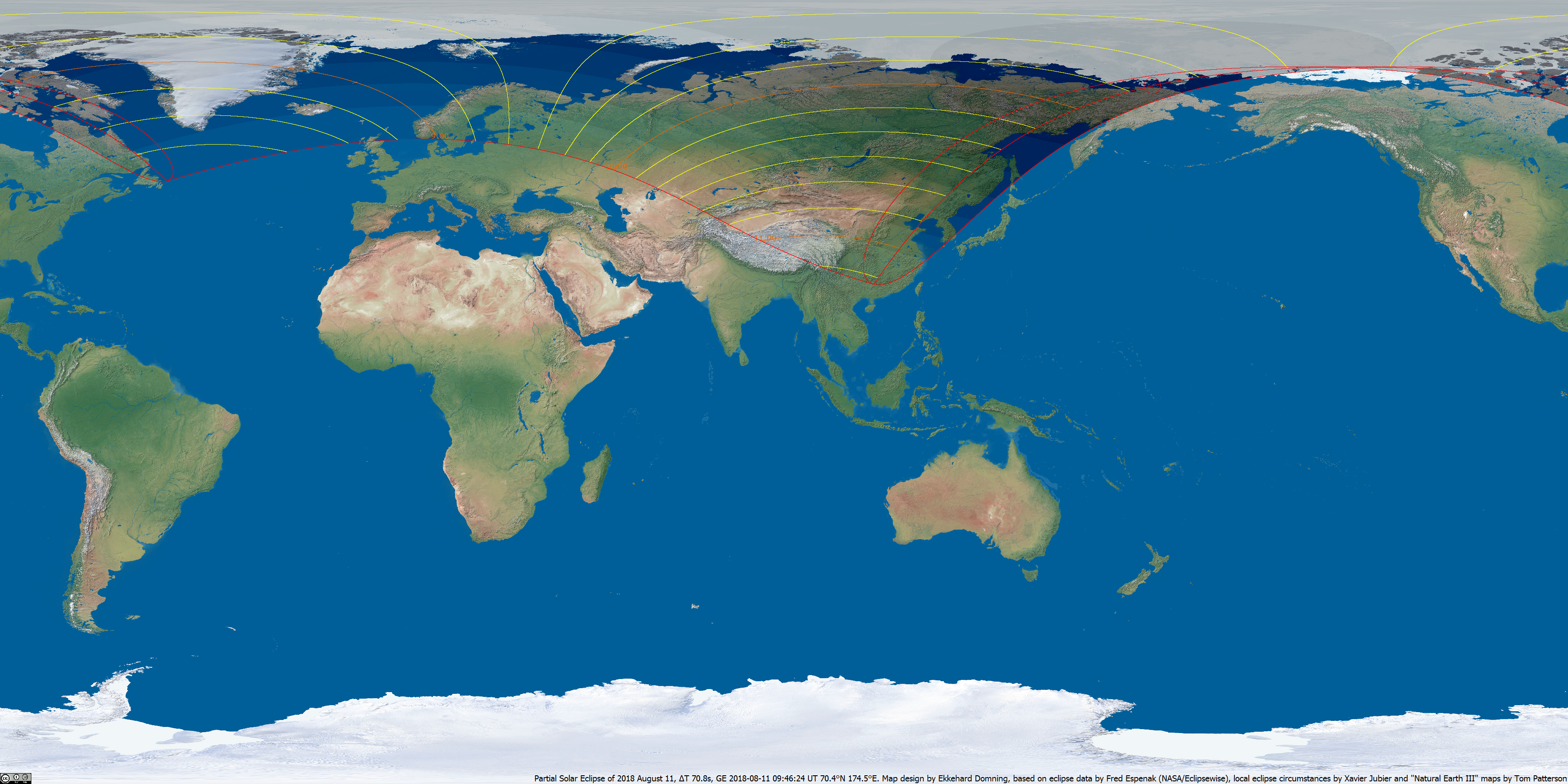

== Eclipse timing ==
=== Places experiencing partial eclipse ===
Solar Eclipse of August 11, 2018 (Local Times)
| Country or territory | City or place | Start of partial eclipse | Maximum eclipse | End of partial eclipse | Duration of eclipse (hr:min) | Maximum coverage |
|---|---|---|---|---|---|---|
| Canada | Mary's Harbour | 05:49:59 (sunrise) | 05:56:30 | 06:19:15 | 0:29 | 4.19% |
| Canada | Happy Valley-Goose Bay | 05:34:57 (sunrise) | 05:38:54 | 05:55:54 | 0:21 | 5.76% |
| Greenland | Nuuk | 06:04:08 | 06:41:31 | 07:20:02 | 1:16 | 19.99% |
| Iceland | Reykjavík | 08:10:06 | 08:44:23 | 09:19:39 | 1:10 | 10.45% |
| Faroe Islands | Tórshavn | 09:20:26 | 09:48:46 | 10:17:47 | 0:57 | 4.58% |
| Canada | Pond Inlet | 04:14:57 | 04:59:06 | 05:44:09 | 1:29 | 42.24% |
| Norway | Oslo | 10:41:08 | 11:01:35 | 11:22:17 | 0:41 | 1.29% |
| Greenland | Pituffik | 05:16:56 | 06:02:44 | 06:49:22 | 1:32 | 43.45% |
| Greenland | Qaanaaq | 06:18:03 | 07:04:15 | 07:51:14 | 1:33 | 44.59% |
| Canada | Resolute | 03:21:09 | 04:06:26 | 04:52:22 | 1:31 | 49.80% |
| Sweden | Stockholm | 10:49:59 | 11:09:31 | 11:29:13 | 0:39 | 1.04% |
| Canada | Eureka | 03:23:23 | 04:10:34 | 04:58:19 | 1:35 | 50.80% |
| Svalbard and Jan Mayen | Longyearbyen | 10:28:22 | 11:17:39 | 12:07:20 | 1:39 | 34.99% |
| Estonia | Tallinn | 11:54:04 | 12:17:43 | 12:41:30 | 0:47 | 1.79% |
| Canada | Coral Harbour | 04:11:37 (sunrise) | 04:17:47 | 04:31:38 | 0:20 | 12.13% |
| Finland | Helsinki | 11:51:09 | 12:18:00 | 12:45:01 | 0:54 | 2.70% |
| Finland | Rovaniemi | 11:37:40 | 12:19:25 | 13:01:29 | 1:24 | 13.29% |
| Russia | Moscow | 12:21:43 | 12:36:23 | 12:51:01 | 0:29 | 0.37% |
| Russia | Pevek | 21:01:41 | 21:49:06 | 22:08:39 (sunset) | 1:07 | 67.94% |
| Russia | Magadan | 20:23:41 | 20:54:20 | 21:00:02 (sunset) | 0:36 | 45.56% |
| Russia | Verkhoyansk | 19:14:19 | 20:04:14 | 20:52:37 | 1:38 | 61.72% |
| Russia | Yakutsk | 18:24:58 | 19:14:02 | 20:01:19 | 1:36 | 57.62% |
| Kazakhstan | Astana | 15:44:39 | 16:22:56 | 16:59:41 | 1:15 | 9.35% |
| South Korea | Seoul | 19:12:45 | 19:24:07 | 19:30:01 (sunset) | 0:17 | 7.74% |
| North Korea | Pyongyang | 19:10:21 | 19:34:43 | 19:37:37 (sunset) | 0:27 | 19.98% |
| China | Shanghai | 18:30:32 | 18:38:40 | 18:41:16 (sunset) | 0:11 | 3.26% |
| Kyrgyzstan | Bishkek | 16:18:33 | 16:40:42 | 17:02:12 | 0:44 | 1.76% |
| Mongolia | Ulaanbaatar | 17:56:21 | 18:40:55 | 19:23:14 | 1:27 | 29.86% |
| Kazakhstan | Almaty | 16:14:50 | 16:41:33 | 17:07:20 | 0:53 | 3.27% |
| China | Beijing | 18:12:31 | 18:51:18 | 19:16:48 (sunset) | 1:04 | 23.01% |

== Gallery ==
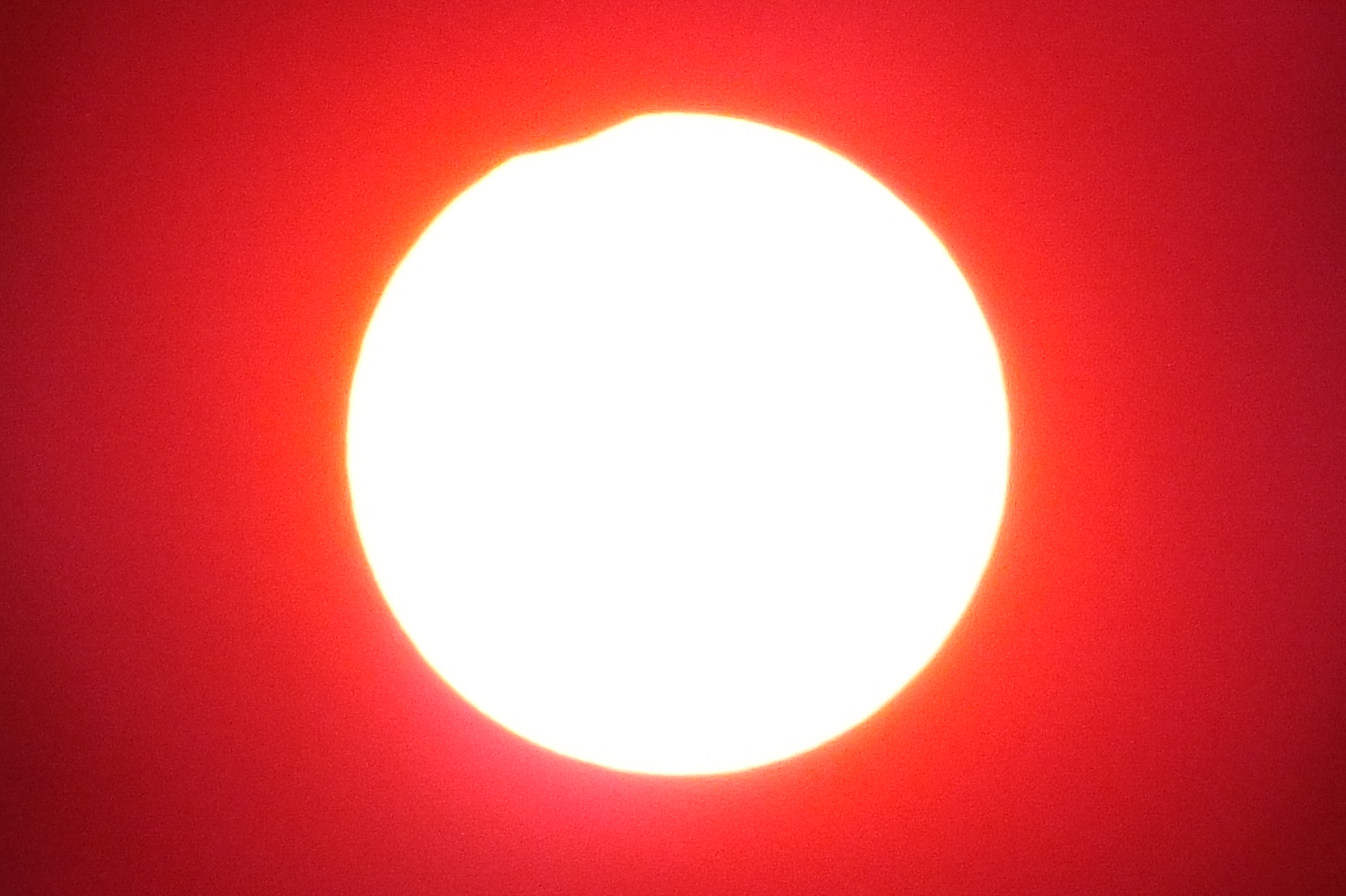
Moscow, Russia, 9:40 UTC

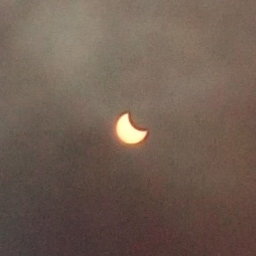
Baley, Russia, 10:24 UTC

== Eclipse details ==
Shown below are two tables displaying details about this particular solar eclipse. The first table outlines times at which the Moon's penumbra or umbra attains the specific parameter, and the second table describes various other parameters pertaining to this eclipse.

August 11, 2018 Solar Eclipse Times
| Event | Time (UTC) |
|---|---|
| First Penumbral External Contact | 2018 August 11 at 08:03:16.2 UTC |
| Equatorial Conjunction | 2018 August 11 at 09:21:12.9 UTC |
| Greatest Eclipse | 2018 August 11 at 09:47:28.0 UTC |
| Ecliptic Conjunction | 2018 August 11 at 09:58:53.5 UTC |
| Last Penumbral External Contact | 2018 August 11 at 11:31:53.5 UTC |

August 11, 2018 Solar Eclipse Parameters
| Parameter | Value |
|---|---|
| Eclipse Magnitude | 0.73677 |
| Eclipse Obscuration | 0.67963 |
| Gamma | 1.14758 |
| Sun Right Ascension | 09h24m28.1s |
| Sun Declination | +15°13'19.1" |
| Sun Semi-Diameter | 15'46.8" |
| Sun Equatorial Horizontal Parallax | 08.7" |
| Moon Right Ascension | 09h25m31.3s |
| Moon Declination | +16°21'40.4" |
| Moon Semi-Diameter | 16'40.0" |
| Moon Equatorial Horizontal Parallax | 1°01'10.1" |
| ΔT | 69.2 s |

== Eclipse season ==
This eclipse is part of an eclipse season, a period, roughly every six months, when eclipses occur. Only two (or occasionally three) eclipse seasons occur each year, and each season lasts about 35 days and repeats just short of six months (173 days) later; thus two full eclipse seasons always occur each year. Either two or three eclipses happen each eclipse season. In the sequence below, each eclipse is separated by a fortnight. The first and last eclipse in this sequence is separated by one synodic month.

Eclipse season of July–August 2018
| July 13 Ascending node (new moon) | July 27 Descending node (full moon) | August 11 Ascending node (new moon) |
|---|---|---|
| Partial solar eclipse Solar Saros 117 | Total lunar eclipse Lunar Saros 129 | Partial solar eclipse Solar Saros 155 |

== Related eclipses ==
=== Eclipses in 2018 ===
- A total lunar eclipse on January 31.
- A partial solar eclipse on February 15.
- A partial solar eclipse on July 13.
- A total lunar eclipse on July 27.
- A partial solar eclipse on August 11.

=== Metonic ===
- Preceded by: Solar eclipse of October 23, 2014

=== Tzolkinex ===
- Preceded by: Solar eclipse of July 1, 2011
- Followed by: Solar eclipse of September 21, 2025

=== Half-Saros ===
- Preceded by: Lunar eclipse of August 6, 2009
- Followed by: Lunar eclipse of August 17, 2027

=== Tritos ===
- Preceded by: Solar eclipse of September 11, 2007
- Followed by: Solar eclipse of July 11, 2029

=== Solar Saros 155 ===
- Preceded by: Solar eclipse of July 31, 2000
- Followed by: Solar eclipse of August 21, 2036

=== Inex ===
- Preceded by: Solar eclipse of August 31, 1989
- Followed by: Solar eclipse of July 22, 2047

=== Triad ===
- Preceded by: Solar eclipse of October 11, 1931
- Followed by: Solar eclipse of June 12, 2105

=== Solar eclipses of 2015–2018 ===
This eclipse is a member of a semester series. An eclipse in a semester series of solar eclipses repeats approximately every 177 days and 4 hours (a semester) at alternating nodes of the Moon's orbit.

The partial solar eclipse on July 13, 2018 occurs in the next lunar year eclipse set.

Solar eclipse series sets from 2015 to 2018
| Descending node | | | Ascending node | | |
| Saros | Map | Gamma | Saros | Map | Gamma |
| 120 Totality in Longyearbyen, Svalbard | March 20, 2015 Total | 0.94536 | 125 Solar Dynamics Observatory | September 13, 2015 Partial | −1.10039 |
| 130 Balikpapan, Indonesia | March 9, 2016 Total | 0.26092 | 135 Annularity in L'Étang-Salé, Réunion | September 1, 2016 Annular | −0.33301 |
| 140 Partial from Buenos Aires, Argentina | February 26, 2017 Annular | −0.45780 | 145 Totality in Madras, OR, USA | August 21, 2017 Total | 0.43671 |
| 150 Partial in Olivos, Buenos Aires, Argentina | February 15, 2018 Partial | −1.21163 | 155 Partial in Huittinen, Finland | August 11, 2018 Partial | 1.14758 |

=== Saros 155 ===
This eclipse is a part of Saros series 155, repeating every 18 years, 11 days, and containing 71 events. The series started with a partial solar eclipse on June 17, 1928. It contains total eclipses from September 12, 2072 through August 30, 2649; hybrid eclipses from September 10, 2667 through October 2, 2703; and annular eclipses from October 13, 2721 through May 8, 3064. The series ends at member 71 as a partial eclipse on July 24, 3190. Its eclipses are tabulated in three columns; every third eclipse in the same column is one exeligmos apart, so they all cast shadows over approximately the same parts of the Earth.

The longest duration of totality will be produced by member 14 at 4 minutes, 5 seconds on November 6, 2162, and the longest duration of annularity will be produced by member 63 at 5 minutes, 31 seconds on April 28, 3046. All eclipses in this series occur at the Moon’s ascending node of orbit.

Series members 1–16 occur between 1928 and 2200:
| 1 | 2 | 3 |
|---|---|---|
| June 17, 1928 | June 29, 1946 | July 9, 1964 |
| 4 | 5 | 6 |
| July 20, 1982 | July 31, 2000 | August 11, 2018 |
| 7 | 8 | 9 |
| August 21, 2036 | September 2, 2054 | September 12, 2072 |
| 10 | 11 | 12 |
| September 23, 2090 | October 5, 2108 | October 16, 2126 |
| 13 | 14 | 15 |
| October 26, 2144 | November 7, 2162 | November 17, 2180 |
16
November 28, 2198

=== Metonic series ===
The metonic series repeats eclipses every 19 years (6939.69 days), lasting about 5 cycles. Eclipses occur in nearly the same calendar date. In addition, the octon subseries repeats 1/5 of that or every 3.8 years (1387.94 days). All eclipses in this table occur at the Moon's ascending node.

22 eclipse events between January 5, 1935 and August 11, 2018
| January 4–5 | October 23–24 | August 10–12 | May 30–31 | March 18–19 |
| 111 | 113 | 115 | 117 | 119 |
|---|---|---|---|---|
| January 5, 1935 | | August 12, 1942 | May 30, 1946 | March 18, 1950 |
| 121 | 123 | 125 | 127 | 129 |
| January 5, 1954 | October 23, 1957 | August 11, 1961 | May 30, 1965 | March 18, 1969 |
| 131 | 133 | 135 | 137 | 139 |
| January 4, 1973 | October 23, 1976 | August 10, 1980 | May 30, 1984 | March 18, 1988 |
| 141 | 143 | 145 | 147 | 149 |
| January 4, 1992 | October 24, 1995 | August 11, 1999 | May 31, 2003 | March 19, 2007 |
| 151 | 153 | 155 | | |
| January 4, 2011 | October 23, 2014 | August 11, 2018 | | |

=== Tritos series ===
This eclipse is a part of a tritos cycle, repeating at alternating nodes every 135 synodic months (≈ 3986.63 days, or 11 years minus 1 month). Their appearance and longitude are irregular due to a lack of synchronization with the anomalistic month (period of perigee), but groupings of 3 tritos cycles (≈ 33 years minus 3 months) come close (≈ 434.044 anomalistic months), so eclipses are similar in these groupings.

The partial solar eclipse on November 4, 2116 (part of Saros 164) is also a part of this series but is not included in the table below.

Series members between 1801 and 2029
| March 24, 1811 (Saros 136) | February 21, 1822 (Saros 137) | January 20, 1833 (Saros 138) | December 21, 1843 (Saros 139) | November 20, 1854 (Saros 140) |
| October 19, 1865 (Saros 141) | September 17, 1876 (Saros 142) | August 19, 1887 (Saros 143) | July 18, 1898 (Saros 144) | June 17, 1909 (Saros 145) |
| May 18, 1920 (Saros 146) | April 18, 1931 (Saros 147) | March 16, 1942 (Saros 148) | February 14, 1953 (Saros 149) | January 14, 1964 (Saros 150) |
| December 13, 1974 (Saros 151) | November 12, 1985 (Saros 152) | October 12, 1996 (Saros 153) | September 11, 2007 (Saros 154) | August 11, 2018 (Saros 155) |
July 11, 2029 (Saros 156)

=== Inex series ===
This eclipse is a part of the long period inex cycle, repeating at alternating nodes, every 358 synodic months (≈ 10,571.95 days, or 29 years minus 20 days). Their appearance and longitude are irregular due to a lack of synchronization with the anomalistic month (period of perigee). However, groupings of 3 inex cycles (≈ 87 years minus 2 months) comes close (≈ 1,151.02 anomalistic months), so eclipses are similar in these groupings.

Series members between 1801 and 2200
| December 30, 1815 (Saros 148) | December 9, 1844 (Saros 149) | November 20, 1873 (Saros 150) |
| October 31, 1902 (Saros 151) | October 11, 1931 (Saros 152) | September 20, 1960 (Saros 153) |
| August 31, 1989 (Saros 154) | August 11, 2018 (Saros 155) | July 22, 2047 (Saros 156) |
| July 1, 2076 (Saros 157) | June 12, 2105 (Saros 158) | May 23, 2134 (Saros 159) |
| | April 12, 2192 (Saros 161) | |
