= Solar eclipse of January 5, 1954 =

20th-century annular solar eclipse

- Annular eclipse
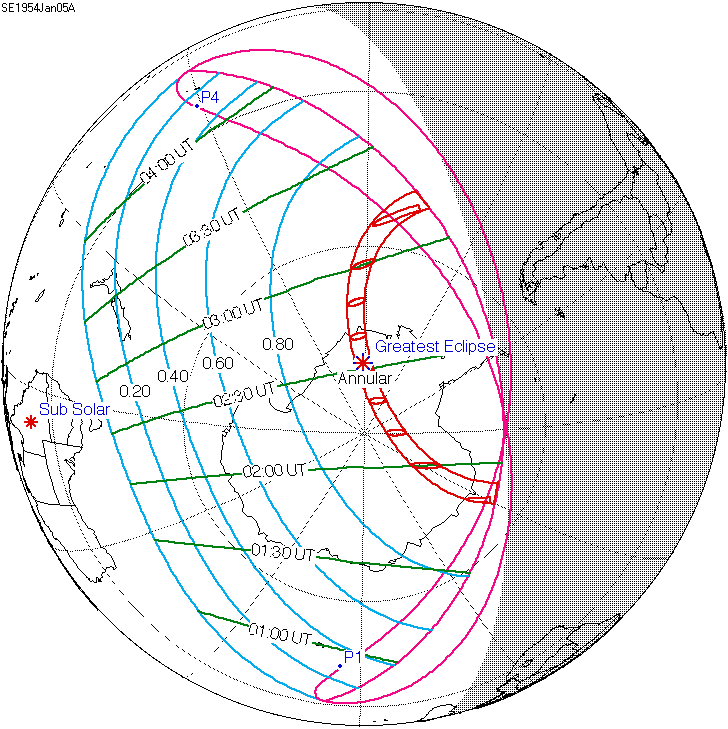
- Map
- Gamma: −0.9296
- Magnitude: 0.972

Maximum eclipse
- Duration: 102 s (1 min 42 s)
- Coordinates: 79.1°S 120.8°W
- Max. width of band: 278 km (173 mi)

Times (UTC)
- Greatest eclipse: 2:32:01

References
- Saros: 121 (57 of 71)
- Catalog # (SE5000): 9407

An annular solar eclipse occurred at the Moon's ascending node of orbit on Tuesday, January 5, 1954, with a magnitude of 0.972. A solar eclipse occurs when the Moon passes between Earth and the Sun, thereby totally or partly obscuring the image of the Sun for a viewer on Earth. An annular solar eclipse occurs when the Moon's apparent diameter is smaller than the Sun's, blocking most of the Sun's light and causing the Sun to look like an annulus (ring). An annular eclipse appears as a partial eclipse over a region of the Earth thousands of kilometres wide. The Moon's apparent diameter was near the average diameter because it occurred 7.5 days after apogee (on December 28, 1953, at 15:10 UTC) and 5.3 days before perigee (on January 10, 1954, at 9:40 UTC).

Annularity was visible from a part of Antarctica. A partial eclipse was visible for parts of Antarctica and Oceania.

== Eclipse details ==
Shown below are two tables displaying details about this particular solar eclipse. The first table outlines times at which the Moon's penumbra or umbra attains the specific parameter, and the second table describes various other parameters pertaining to this eclipse.

January 5, 1954 Solar Eclipse Times
Event	Time (UTC)
First Penumbral External Contact	1954 January 5 at 00:14:31.4 UTC
First Umbral External Contact	1954 January 5 at 01:49:19.1 UTC
First Central Line	1954 January 5 at 01:52:10.6 UTC
Greatest Duration	1954 January 5 at 01:52:10.6 UTC
First Umbral Internal Contact	1954 January 5 at 01:55:13.3 UTC
Equatorial Conjunction	1954 January 5 at 02:10:41.6 UTC
Ecliptic Conjunction	1954 January 5 at 02:21:50.0 UTC
Greatest Eclipse	1954 January 5 at 02:32:00.6 UTC
Last Umbral Internal Contact	1954 January 5 at 03:09:05.0 UTC
Last Central Line	1954 January 5 at 03:12:04.6 UTC
Last Umbral External Contact	1954 January 5 at 03:14:52.9 UTC
Last Penumbral External Contact	1954 January 5 at 04:49:32.8 UTC

January 5, 1954 Solar Eclipse Parameters
Parameter	Value
Eclipse Magnitude	0.97203
Eclipse Obscuration	0.94484
Gamma	−0.92960
Sun Right Ascension	19h01m47.3s
Sun Declination	-22°41'10.7"
Sun Semi-Diameter	16'15.9"
Sun Equatorial Horizontal Parallax	08.9"
Moon Right Ascension	19h02m34.8s
Moon Declination	-23°33'33.5"
Moon Semi-Diameter	15'43.5"
Moon Equatorial Horizontal Parallax	0°57'42.6"
ΔT	30.7 s

== Eclipse season ==
This eclipse is part of an eclipse season, a period, roughly every six months, when eclipses occur. Only two (or occasionally three) eclipse seasons occur each year, and each season lasts about 35 days and repeats just short of six months (173 days) later; thus two full eclipse seasons always occur each year. Either two or three eclipses happen each eclipse season. In the sequence below, each eclipse is separated by a fortnight.

Eclipse season of January 1954
January 5 Ascending node (new moon)	January 19 Descending node (full moon)
Annular solar eclipse Solar Saros 121	Total lunar eclipse Lunar Saros 133

== Related eclipses ==
=== Eclipses in 1954 ===
- An annular solar eclipse on January 5.
- A total lunar eclipse on January 19.
- A total solar eclipse on June 30.
- A partial lunar eclipse on July 16.
- An annular solar eclipse on December 25.

=== Metonic ===
- Preceded by: Solar eclipse of March 18, 1950
- Followed by: Solar eclipse of October 23, 1957

=== Tzolkinex ===
- Preceded by: Solar eclipse of November 23, 1946
- Followed by: Solar eclipse of February 15, 1961

=== Half-Saros ===
- Preceded by: Lunar eclipse of December 29, 1944
- Followed by: Lunar eclipse of January 9, 1963

=== Tritos ===
- Preceded by: Solar eclipse of February 4, 1943
- Followed by: Solar eclipse of December 4, 1964

=== Solar Saros 121 ===
- Preceded by: Solar eclipse of December 25, 1935
- Followed by: Solar eclipse of January 16, 1972

=== Inex ===
- Preceded by: Solar eclipse of January 24, 1925
- Followed by: Solar eclipse of December 15, 1982

=== Triad ===
- Preceded by: Solar eclipse of March 6, 1867
- Followed by: Solar eclipse of November 4, 2040

=== Solar eclipses of 1953–1956 ===
This eclipse is a member of a semester series. An eclipse in a semester series of solar eclipses repeats approximately every 177 days and 4 hours (a semester) at alternating nodes of the Moon's orbit.

The partial solar eclipses on February 14, 1953 and August 9, 1953 occur in the previous lunar year eclipse set.

Solar eclipse series sets from 1953 to 1956
Descending node			Ascending node		
Saros	Map	Gamma	Saros	Map	Gamma
116	July 11, 1953 Partial	1.4388	121	January 5, 1954 Annular	−0.9296
126	June 30, 1954 Total	0.6135	131	December 25, 1954 Annular	−0.2576
136	June 20, 1955 Total	−0.1528	141	December 14, 1955 Annular	0.4266
146	June 8, 1956 Total	−0.8934	151	December 2, 1956 Partial	1.0923

=== Saros 121 ===
This eclipse is a part of Saros series 121, repeating every 18 years, 11 days, and containing 71 events. The series started with a partial solar eclipse on April 25, 944 AD. It contains total eclipses from July 10, 1070 through October 9, 1809; hybrid eclipses on October 20, 1827 and October 30, 1845; and annular eclipses from November 11, 1863 through February 28, 2044. The series ends at member 71 as a partial eclipse on June 7, 2206. Its eclipses are tabulated in three columns; every third eclipse in the same column is one exeligmos apart, so they all cast shadows over approximately the same parts of the Earth.

The longest duration of totality was produced by member 39 at 6 minutes, 20 seconds on June 21, 1629, and the longest duration of annularity will be produced by member 62 at 2 minutes, 27 seconds on February 28, 2044. All eclipses in this series occur at the Moon’s ascending node of orbit.

Series members 49–70 occur between 1801 and 2200:
49	50	51
October 9, 1809	October 20, 1827	October 30, 1845
52	53	54
November 11, 1863	November 21, 1881	December 3, 1899
55	56	57
December 14, 1917	December 25, 1935	January 5, 1954
58	59	60
January 16, 1972	January 26, 1990	February 7, 2008
61	62	63
February 17, 2026	February 28, 2044	March 11, 2062
64	65	66
March 21, 2080	April 1, 2098	April 13, 2116
67	68	69
April 24, 2134	May 4, 2152	May 16, 2170
70
May 26, 2188

=== Metonic series ===
The metonic series repeats eclipses every 19 years (6939.69 days), lasting about 5 cycles. Eclipses occur in nearly the same calendar date. In addition, the octon subseries repeats 1/5 of that or every 3.8 years (1387.94 days). All eclipses in this table occur at the Moon's ascending node.

22 eclipse events between January 5, 1935 and August 11, 2018
January 4–5	October 23–24	August 10–12	May 30–31	March 18–19
111	113	115	117	119
January 5, 1935		August 12, 1942	May 30, 1946	March 18, 1950
121	123	125	127	129
January 5, 1954	October 23, 1957	August 11, 1961	May 30, 1965	March 18, 1969
131	133	135	137	139
January 4, 1973	October 23, 1976	August 10, 1980	May 30, 1984	March 18, 1988
141	143	145	147	149
January 4, 1992	October 24, 1995	August 11, 1999	May 31, 2003	March 19, 2007
151	153	155		
January 4, 2011	October 23, 2014	August 11, 2018		

=== Tritos series ===
This eclipse is a part of a tritos cycle, repeating at alternating nodes every 135 synodic months (≈ 3986.63 days, or 11 years minus 1 month). Their appearance and longitude are irregular due to a lack of synchronization with the anomalistic month (period of perigee), but groupings of 3 tritos cycles (≈ 33 years minus 3 months) come close (≈ 434.044 anomalistic months), so eclipses are similar in these groupings.

Series members between 1801 and 2200
March 14, 1801 (Saros 107)	February 12, 1812 (Saros 108)	January 12, 1823 (Saros 109)		November 10, 1844 (Saros 111)
		August 9, 1877 (Saros 114)	July 9, 1888 (Saros 115)	June 8, 1899 (Saros 116)
May 9, 1910 (Saros 117)	April 8, 1921 (Saros 118)	March 7, 1932 (Saros 119)	February 4, 1943 (Saros 120)	January 5, 1954 (Saros 121)
December 4, 1964 (Saros 122)	November 3, 1975 (Saros 123)	October 3, 1986 (Saros 124)	September 2, 1997 (Saros 125)	August 1, 2008 (Saros 126)
July 2, 2019 (Saros 127)	June 1, 2030 (Saros 128)	April 30, 2041 (Saros 129)	March 30, 2052 (Saros 130)	February 28, 2063 (Saros 131)
January 27, 2074 (Saros 132)	December 27, 2084 (Saros 133)	November 27, 2095 (Saros 134)	October 26, 2106 (Saros 135)	September 26, 2117 (Saros 136)
August 25, 2128 (Saros 137)	July 25, 2139 (Saros 138)	June 25, 2150 (Saros 139)	May 25, 2161 (Saros 140)	April 23, 2172 (Saros 141)
March 23, 2183 (Saros 142)	February 21, 2194 (Saros 143)			

=== Inex series ===
This eclipse is a part of the long period inex cycle, repeating at alternating nodes, every 358 synodic months (≈ 10,571.95 days, or 29 years minus 20 days). Their appearance and longitude are irregular due to a lack of synchronization with the anomalistic month (period of perigee). However, groupings of 3 inex cycles (≈ 87 years minus 2 months) comes close (≈ 1,151.02 anomalistic months), so eclipses are similar in these groupings.

Series members between 1801 and 2200
April 14, 1809 (Saros 116)	March 25, 1838 (Saros 117)	March 6, 1867 (Saros 118)
February 13, 1896 (Saros 119)	January 24, 1925 (Saros 120)	January 5, 1954 (Saros 121)
December 15, 1982 (Saros 122)	November 25, 2011 (Saros 123)	November 4, 2040 (Saros 124)
October 15, 2069 (Saros 125)	September 25, 2098 (Saros 126)	September 6, 2127 (Saros 127)
August 16, 2156 (Saros 128)	July 26, 2185 (Saros 129)	
