= Socrates of Constantinople =

Greek Christian church historian

- Born: c. 380; Constantinople, Eastern Roman Empire (modern-day Istanbul, Turkey)
- Died: c. 439 (aged c. 59); Constantinople, Eastern Roman Empire
- Occupation: Historian
- Writing career
- Period: Theodosian dynasty

Socrates of Constantinople (c. 380 – after 439), also known as Socrates Scholasticus (Ancient Greek: Σωκράτης ὁ Σχολαστικός), was a 5th-century Greek Christian church historian, a contemporary of Sozomen and Theodoret.

He is the author of a Historia Ecclesiastica ("Church History", Ἐκκλησιαστική Ἱστορία) which covers the history of late ancient Christianity during the years 305 to 439.

== Life ==
He was born in Constantinople. Even in ancient times, nothing seems to have been known of his life except what can be gathered from notices in his Historia Ecclesiastica, which departed from its ostensible model, Eusebius of Caesarea, in emphasizing the place of the emperor in church affairs and in giving secular as well as church history.

Socrates' teachers, noted in his prefaces, were the grammarians Helladius and Ammonius, who came to Constantinople from Alexandria, where in 391 they had been involved in a violent revolt that culminated in the destruction of the Serapeum of Alexandria.

It is not proved that Socrates of Constantinople later profited from the teachings of the sophist Troilus. No certainty exists as to Socrates' precise vocation, though it may be inferred from his work that he was a layman.

In later years, he traveled and visited, among other places, Paphlagonia and Cyprus.

== Historia Ecclesiastica ==
The history covers the years 305 to 439, and experts believe it was finished in 439 or soon thereafter, and certainly during the lifetime of Emperor Theodosius II, i.e., before 450. The purpose of the history is to continue the work of Eusebius of Caesarea (1.1). It relates in simple Greek language what the Church experienced from the days of Constantine to the writer's time. Ecclesiastical dissensions occupy the foreground, for when the Church is at peace, there is nothing for the church historian to relate (7.48.7). In the preface to Book 5, Socrates defends dealing with Arianism and with political events in addition to writing about the church.

Socrates' account is in many respects well-balanced. He is careful not to use hyperbolic titles when referring to prominent personalities in the church and the government and he even criticizes Eusebius for his excessive praises to Emperor Constantine the Great in his Vita Constantini.

The Historia Ecclesiastica is one of the few sources of information about Hypatia, the female mathematician and philosopher of Alexandria, who was brutally murdered by a mob, allegedly by order of Patriarch Cyril of Alexandria. Socrates presents Hypatia's murder as entirely politically motivated and makes no mention of any role that Hypatia's neoplatonism might have played in her death, arguing instead that she was killed for supporting local prefect Orestes in his political struggle against Cyril. Socrates unequivocally condemns the actions of the mob, declaring, "Surely nothing can be farther from the spirit of Christianity than the allowance of massacres, fights, and transactions of that sort."

Socrates is often assumed to have been a follower of Novatianism, but this is based on the fact that he gives a lot of details about the Novatianists, and speaks of them in generous terms, as he does of Arians and other groups. He speaks of himself as belonging to the church.

Socrates asserts that he owed the impulse to write his work to a certain Theodorus, who is alluded to in the proemium to the second book as "a holy man of God" and seems therefore to have been a monk or one of the higher clergy. The contemporary historians Sozomen and Theodoret were combined with Socrates in a sixth-century compilation, which has obscured their differences until recently, when their individual portrayals of the series of Christian emperors were distinguished one from another and contrasted by Hartmut Leppin, Von Constantin dem Großen zu Theodosius II (Göttingen 1996).

=== Editions and translations ===
The Historia Ecclesiastica was first edited in Greek by Robert Estienne, on the basis of Codex Regius 1443 (Paris, 1544); a translation into Latin by Johannes Christophorson (1612) is important for its variant readings. The fundamental early modern edition, however, was produced by Henricus Valesius (Henri Valois) (Paris, 1668), who used the Codex Regius, a Codex Vaticanus, and a Codex Florentinus, and also employed the indirect tradition of Theodorus Lector (Codex Leonis Alladi).

The text was edited in Patrologia Graeca vol. 67 (online at documentacatholicaomnia.eu). The new critical edition of the text is edited by G. C. Hansen, and published in the series Die Griechischen Christlichen Schriftsteller (Berlin: Akademie Verlag, 1995). An English translation by A. C. Zenos was published in Nicene and Post-Nicene Fathers, Second Series, Vol. 2, edited by Philip Schaff and Henry Wallace, Buffalo, NY: Christian Literature Publishing Co., 1890 (online editions: newadvent.org, ccel.org, munseys.com). More recently (2004–2007), Socrates' History has been published in four bilingual (Greek/Latin and French) volumes by Pierre Maraval in the Sources Chrétiennes collection.
