= Solar eclipse of March 29, 2006 =

Total eclipse

- Total eclipse
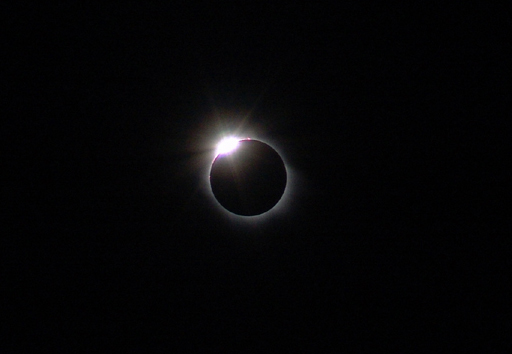
- Totality from Side, Turkey

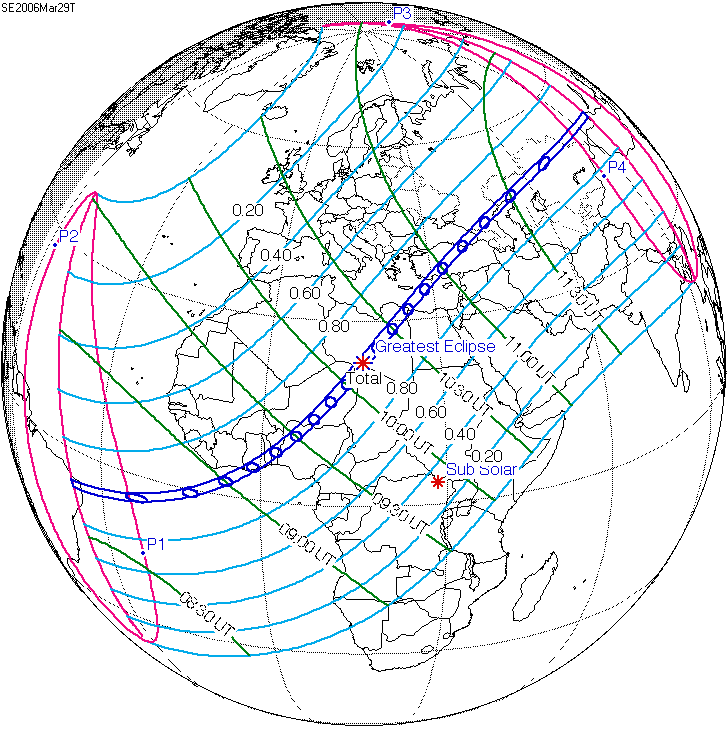
- Map
- Gamma: 0.3843
- Magnitude: 1.0515

Maximum eclipse
- Duration: 247 s (4 min 7 s)
- Coordinates: 23.2°N 16.7°E
- Max. width of band: 184 km (114 mi)

Times (UTC)
- (P1) Partial begin: 7:36:50
- (U1) Total begin: 8:34:20
- Greatest eclipse: 10:12:23
- (U4) Total end: 11:47:55
- (P4) Partial end: 12:45:35

References
- Saros: 139 (29 of 71)
- Catalog # (SE5000): 9521

A total solar eclipse occurred at the Moon’s ascending node of orbit on Wednesday, March 29, 2006, with a magnitude of 1.0515. A solar eclipse occurs when the Moon passes between Earth and the Sun, thereby totally or partly obscuring the image of the Sun for a viewer on Earth. A total solar eclipse occurs when the Moon's apparent diameter is larger than the Sun's, blocking all direct sunlight, turning day into darkness. Totality occurs in a narrow path across Earth's surface, with the partial solar eclipse visible over a surrounding region thousands of kilometres wide. Occurring about 1.1 days after perigee (on March 28, 2006, at 8:10 UTC), the Moon's apparent diameter was larger.

This was the second solar eclipse visible in Africa within just 6 months.

== Visibility ==
Animated path

The path of totality of the Moon's shadow began at sunrise in Brazil and extended across the Atlantic to Africa, traveling across Ghana, the southeastern tip of Ivory Coast, Togo, Benin, Nigeria, Niger, Chad, Libya, and a small corner of northwest Egypt, from there across the Mediterranean Sea to Greece (Kastellórizo) and Turkey, then across the Black Sea via Georgia, Russia, and Kazakhstan to Western Mongolia, where it ended at sunset. A partial eclipse was seen from the much broader path of the Moon's penumbra, including eastern South America, the northern two-thirds of Africa, the whole of Europe, the Middle East, Central Asia, and South Asia.

== Observations ==
People around the world gathered in areas where the eclipse was visible to view the event. The Manchester Astronomical Society, the Malaysian Space Agency, the Astronomical Society of the Pacific, as well as dozens of tour groups met at the Apollo temple and the theater in Side, Turkey. The San Francisco Exploratorium featured a live webcast from the site, where thousands of observers were seated in the ancient, Roman-style theater.

Almost all actively visited areas in the path of totality had perfect weather. Many observers reported an unusually beautiful eclipse, with many or all effects visible, and a very nice corona, despite the proximity to the solar minimum. The partial phase of the eclipse was also visible from the International Space Station, where the astronauts on board took spectacular pictures of the Moon's shadow on Earth's surface. It initially appeared as though an orbit correction set for the middle of March would bring the ISS into the path of totality, but this correction was postponed.

The Paris Observatory sent a team of students and coordinators to Savalou, Benin. The team took clear images of the corona. A team of Williams College, Massachusetts did many experiments and took images of the corona on the Greek island of Kastellórizo with 3 minutes of totality, which is close to the coast of Turkey and the only place in the European Union covered by the path of totality. The Solar and Heliospheric Observatory also made auxiliary observations to compare images taken from space and from the ground. Another research simulated the changing colours of the sky in the path of totality with a three-dimensional model while considering multiple scattering. Monte Carlo method was used in the experiment to predict the colour and brightness of the sky. In addition, the direct irradiation of the corona was also studied. The goal was to plan and optimise studies on incoming solar irradiance. Russian scientists studied on coronal polarization in the Baksan River Gorge surrounded by snow mountains in the North Caucasus. The location has an altitude of 1,800 metres and is 25 kilometres from Mount Elbrus, the highest peak in Russia and also Europe.

Libya under Muammar Gaddafi was under sanctions because of bombing the Pan Am Flight 103 and had a strict alcohol ban. It was the least visited region around the Mediterranean. To promote tourism, the Libyan government mobilized 5 state-owned tourism companies to attract more tourists, and built a tent village that could accommodate 7,000 people in Waw an Namus inside the Sahara Desert with excellent observation conditions. However, it was only open to astronomers, while ordinary tourists were directed to Patan, near the border with Egypt. Despite Libya's desire to attract tourists from all over the world, Israelis were still banned from entering the country. NASA scientists also did joint observation and research with Libyan scientists, taking images and videos.

A team of 20 people from the Chinese Astronomical Society took images of Baily's beads, corona and prominences in Sallum, Egypt. The weather conditions were good in Sallum and also neighbouring Libya. Then Egyptian President Hosni Mubarak, Minister of Defense Muhammad Tantawi and other officials also went there by helicopter and observed the eclipse with scientists and tourists.

== Satellite failure ==
The satellite responsible for SKY Network Television, a New Zealand pay TV company, failed the day after this eclipse at around 1900 local time. While SKY didn't directly attribute the failure to the eclipse, they said in a media release that it took longer to resolve the issue because of it, but this claim was rejected by astronomers. The main reason for the failure was because of an aging and increasingly faulty satellite.

== Eclipse timing ==
=== Places experiencing total eclipse ===
Solar Eclipse of March 29, 2006 (Local Times)
Country or territory	City or place	Start of partial eclipse	Start of total eclipse	Maximum eclipse	End of total eclipse	End of partial eclipse	Duration of totality (min:s)	Duration of eclipse (hr:min)	Maximum magnitude
Brazil	Natal	05:23:42 (sunrise)	05:35:03	05:35:51	05:36:39	06:34:37	1:36	1:11	1.0078
Ghana	Cape Coast	07:59:24	09:07:51	09:09:31	09:11:13	10:27:10	3:22	2:28	1.0184
Ghana	Accra	08:00:49	09:10:05	09:11:33	09:13:00	10:29:44	2:55	2:29	1.0111
Togo	Atakpamé	08:04:58	09:15:04	09:16:46	09:18:28	10:35:53	3:24	2:31	1.0169
Benin	Bohicon	09:05:10	10:16:03	10:17:21	10:18:39	11:36:48	2:36	2:32	1.0078
Benin	Savè	09:06:55	10:17:42	10:19:29	10:21:16	11:39:15	3:34	2:32	1.019
Benin	Parakou	09:09:14	10:21:01	10:22:07	10:23:13	11:42:06	2:12	2:33	1.0052
Nigeria	Gusau	09:18:02	10:31:23	10:33:19	10:35:16	11:55:03	3:53	2:37	1.0253
Nigeria	Katsina	09:20:31	10:34:24	10:36:21	10:38:18	11:58:24	3:54	2:38	1.0229
Niger	Maradi	09:20:57	10:35:15	10:36:37	10:37:59	11:58:32	2:44	2:38	1.0075
Niger	Zinder	09:23:33	10:38:30	10:40:05	10:41:41	12:02:34	3:11	2:39	1.0106
Turkey	Kaş	12:35:01	13:52:14	13:53:45	13:55:16	15:11:04	3:02	2:36	1.0101
Turkey	Kemer	12:37:01	13:53:50	13:55:37	13:57:24	15:12:36	3:34	2:36	1.0168
Turkey	Antalya	12:37:41	13:54:32	13:56:10	13:57:47	15:12:59	3:15	2:35	1.0125
Turkey	Side	12:38:30	13:55:10	13:57:03	13:58:55	15:13:47	3:45	2:35	1.023
Turkey	Alanya	12:39:05	13:56:23	13:57:42	13:59:00	15:14:23	2:37	2:35	1.0072
Turkey	Konya	12:41:50	13:58:05	13:59:54	14:01:42	15:15:55	3:37	2:34	1.019
Turkey	Kayseri	12:47:29	14:04:08	14:05:02	14:05:56	15:19:59	1:48	2:33	1.0035
Turkey	Amasya	12:50:32	14:06:29	14:07:12	14:07:56	15:21:15	1:27	2:31	1.0024
Georgia	Sukhumi	13:00:29	14:14:01	14:15:31	14:17:01	15:27:16	3:00	2:27	1.013
Russia	Pyatigorsk	14:04:15	15:17:08	15:18:29	15:19:50	16:29:15	2:42	2:25	1.0103
Russia	Mineralnye Vody	14:04:30	15:17:31	15:18:39	15:19:47	16:29:20	2:16	2:25	1.0067
Russia	Astrakhan	14:12:25	15:24:12	15:24:41	15:25:10	16:33:11	0:58	2:21	1.0015
Kazakhstan	Atyrau	15:17:31	16:27:10	16:28:37	16:30:04	17:35:44	2:54	2:18	1.0169
Kazakhstan	Arkalyk	16:33:32	17:38:14	17:39:31	17:40:47	18:41:26	2:33	2:08	1.0185
Kazakhstan	Astana	16:37:03	17:40:21	17:41:31	17:42:41	18:42:02	2:20	2:05	1.0144
Russia	Gorno-Altaysk	17:45:39	18:44:49	18:45:52	18:46:54	19:42:31	2:05	1:58	1.0159
Russia	Kyzyl	18:49:01	19:46:01	19:46:59	19:47:57	20:09:54 (sunset)	1:56	1:21	1.0158

=== Places experiencing partial eclipse ===
Solar Eclipse of March 29, 2006 (Local Times)
Country or territory	City or place	Start of partial eclipse	Maximum eclipse	End of partial eclipse	Duration of eclipse (hr:min)	Maximum coverage
Brazil	Fortaleza	05:36:28 (sunrise)	05:39:11	06:35:02	0:59	92.50%
Liberia	Monrovia	07:56:21	09:01:14	10:13:24	2:17	83.26%
Ivory Coast	Abidjan	07:57:56	09:06:40	10:22:58	2:25	98.28%
Ivory Coast	Yamoussoukro	07:59:35	09:07:47	10:23:29	2:24	91.68%
Ghana	Kumasi	08:01:36	09:11:50	10:29:34	2:28	99.07%
Togo	Lomé	08:02:49	09:14:21	10:33:15	2:30	99.99%
Benin	Porto-Novo	09:04:34	10:16:49	11:36:19	2:32	98.56%
Nigeria	Lagos	09:05:09	10:17:43	11:37:26	2:32	96.95%
Burkina Faso	Ouagadougou	08:11:40	09:22:18	10:39:58	2:28	84.04%
Niger	Niamey	09:16:29	10:29:25	11:49:07	2:33	89.49%
Chad	N'Djamena	09:28:28	10:46:07	12:08:40	2:40	81.07%
Libya	Tobruk	11:19:32	12:39:11	13:59:00	2:39	99.83%
Greece	Athens	12:30:22	13:47:10	15:03:43	2:33	84.05%
Egypt	Cairo	11:27:50	12:47:52	14:06:32	2:39	84.14%
Bulgaria	Sofia	12:38:46	13:52:08	15:05:05	2:26	70.56%
Israel	Jerusalem	11:37:49	12:56:51	14:13:30	2:36	79.92%
Romania	Bucharest	12:44:38	13:57:32	15:09:32	2:25	71.41%
Cyprus	Nicosia	12:39:13	13:58:10	15:14:57	2:36	94.80%
Jordan	Amman	11:39:23	12:58:12	14:14:29	2:35	78.88%
Lebanon	Beirut	12:41:05	13:59:54	15:16:11	2:35	86.11%
Syria	Damascus	11:42:05	13:00:44	14:16:43	2:35	83.07%
Turkey	Ankara	12:45:22	14:02:28	15:17:27	2:32	97.74%
Armenia	Yerevan	15:03:03	16:18:20	17:29:41	2:27	89.99%
Georgia	Tbilisi	14:04:42	15:19:30	16:30:27	2:26	94.82%
Azerbaijan	Baku	15:11:35	16:24:59	17:33:58	2:22	82.51%
Kazakhstan	Oral	15:18:56	16:27:55	17:33:31	2:15	87.68%
Kazakhstan	Aktobe	15:24:23	16:32:51	17:37:29	2:13	96.65%
Russia	Omsk	17:37:19	18:39:59	19:39:14	2:02	88.78%
Russia	Novosibirsk	17:42:33	18:42:56	19:40:00	1:57	90.92%
Mongolia	Khovd	18:50:50	19:49:19	20:18:31 (sunset)	1:28	88.20%

== Gallery ==
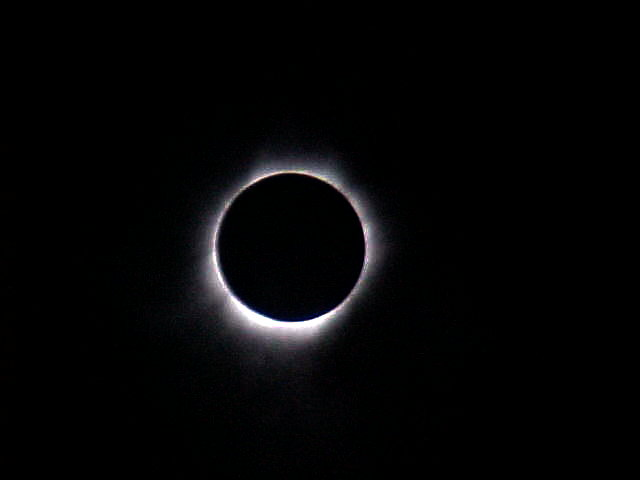
Cape Coast, Ghana (9:10 UTC)

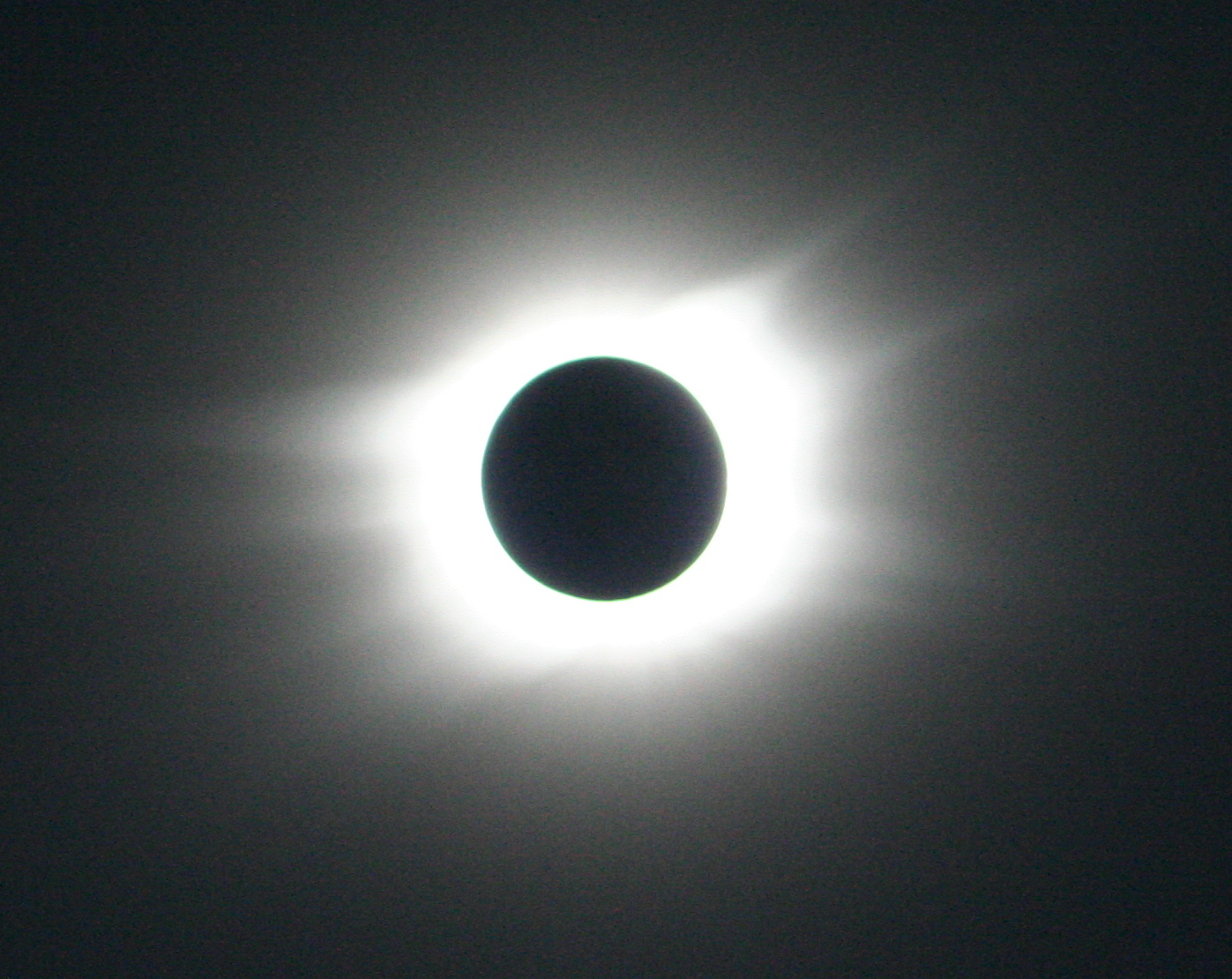
Murzuq District, Libya (10:16 UTC)

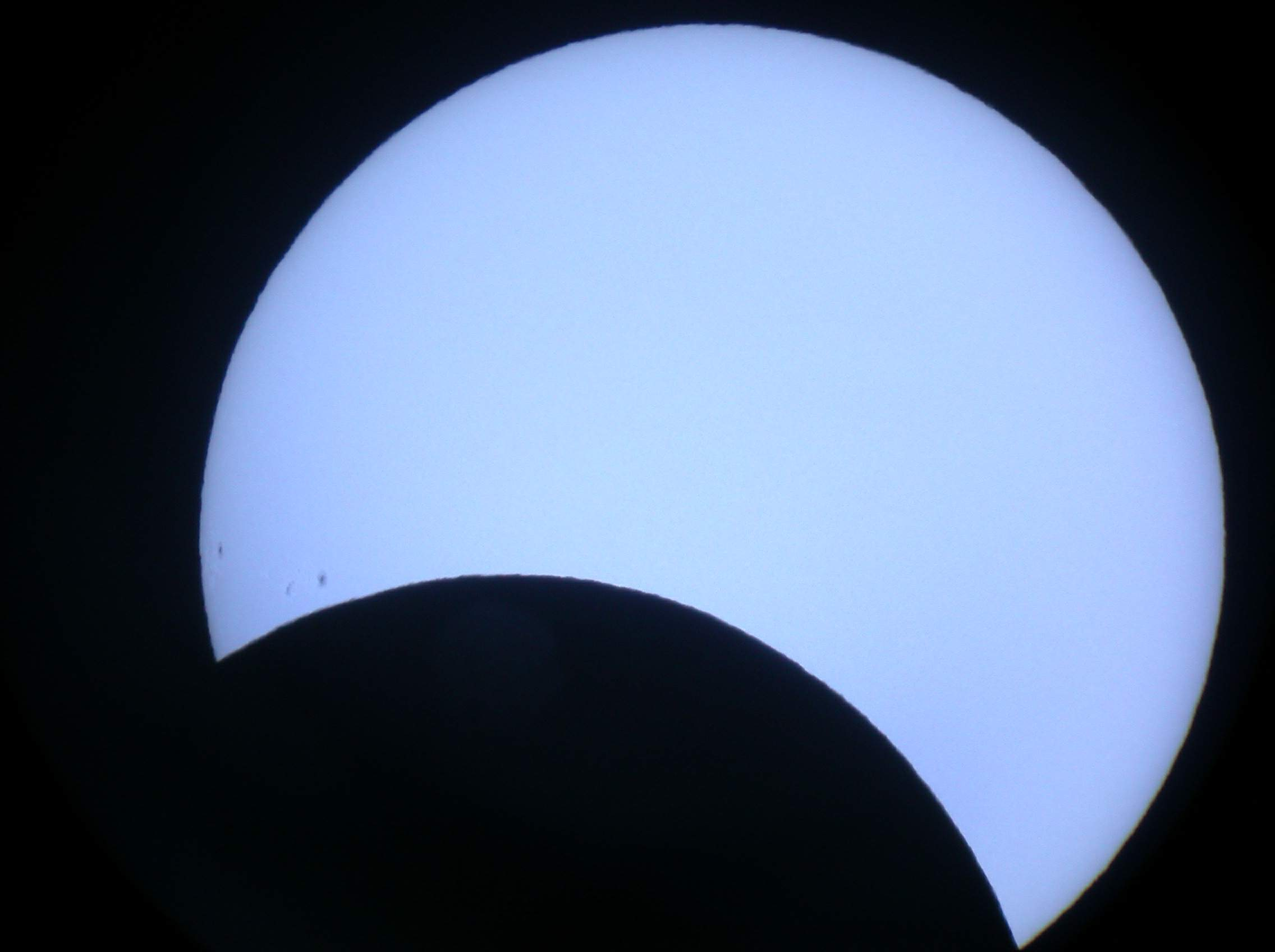
Valencia, Spain (10:16 UTC)

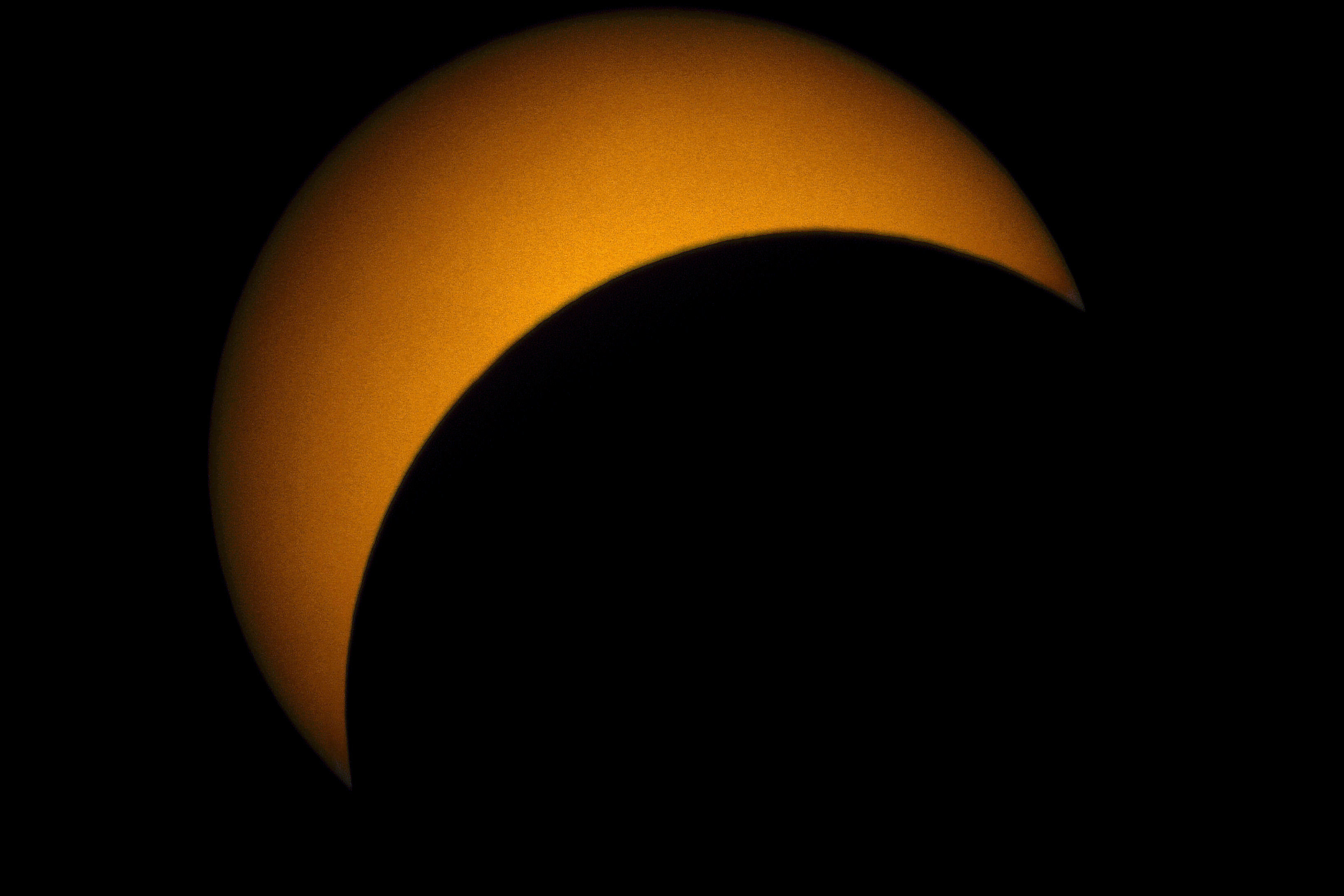
Oria, Italy (10:39 UTC)

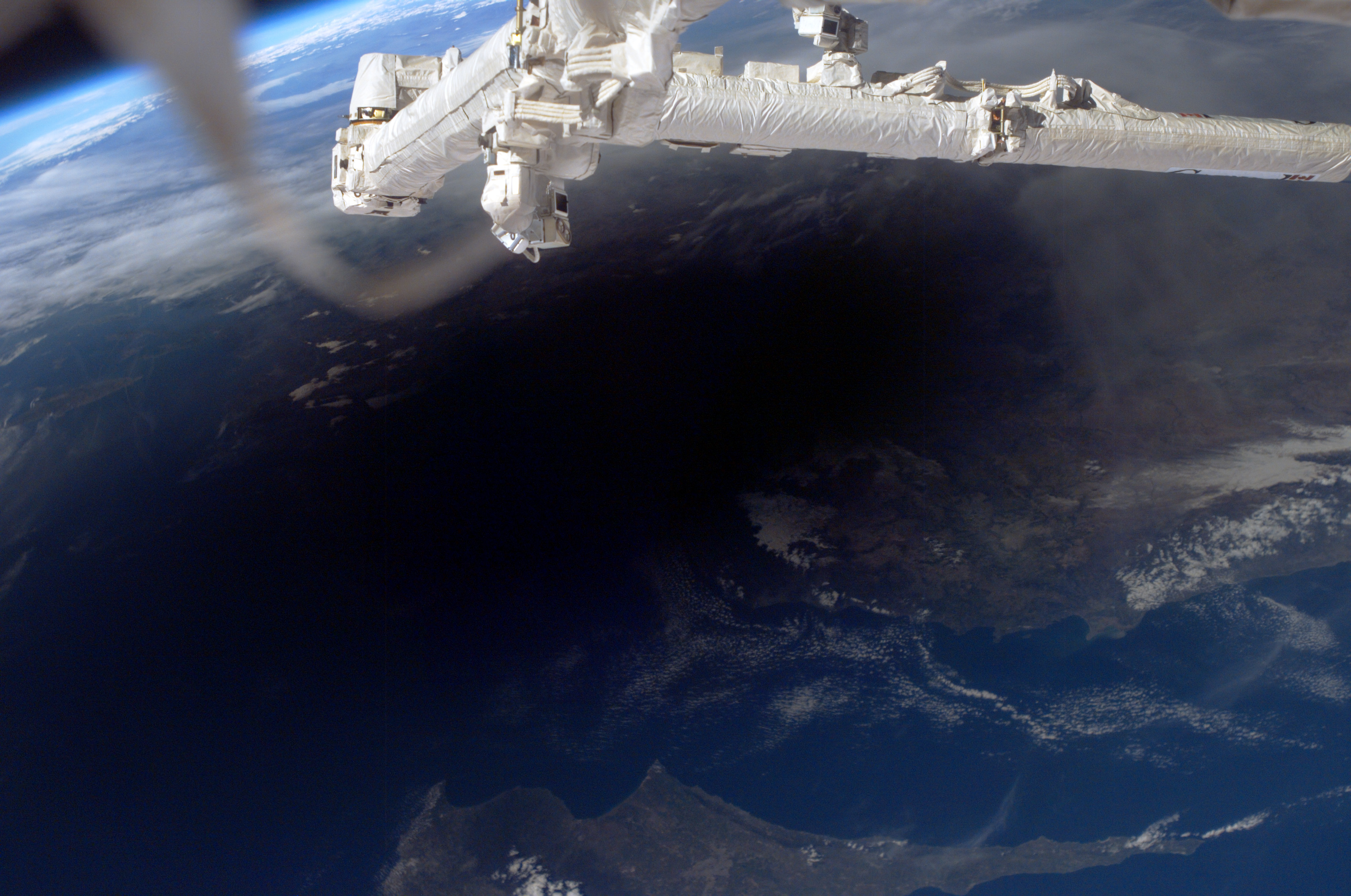
The Moon's shadow as seen from the International Space Station (10:50 UTC)

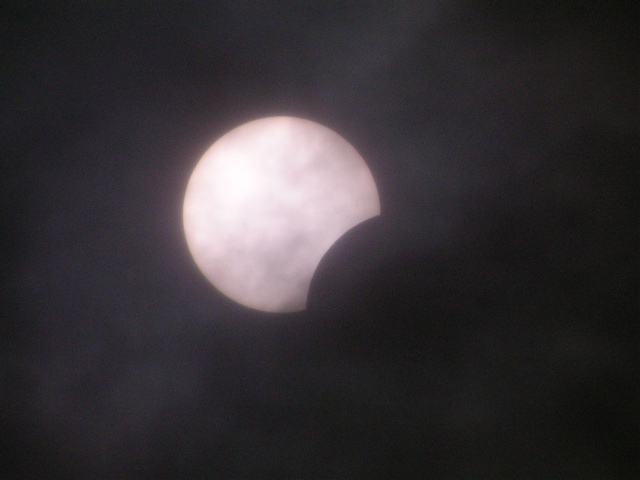
Berkhamsted, England (11:01 UTC)

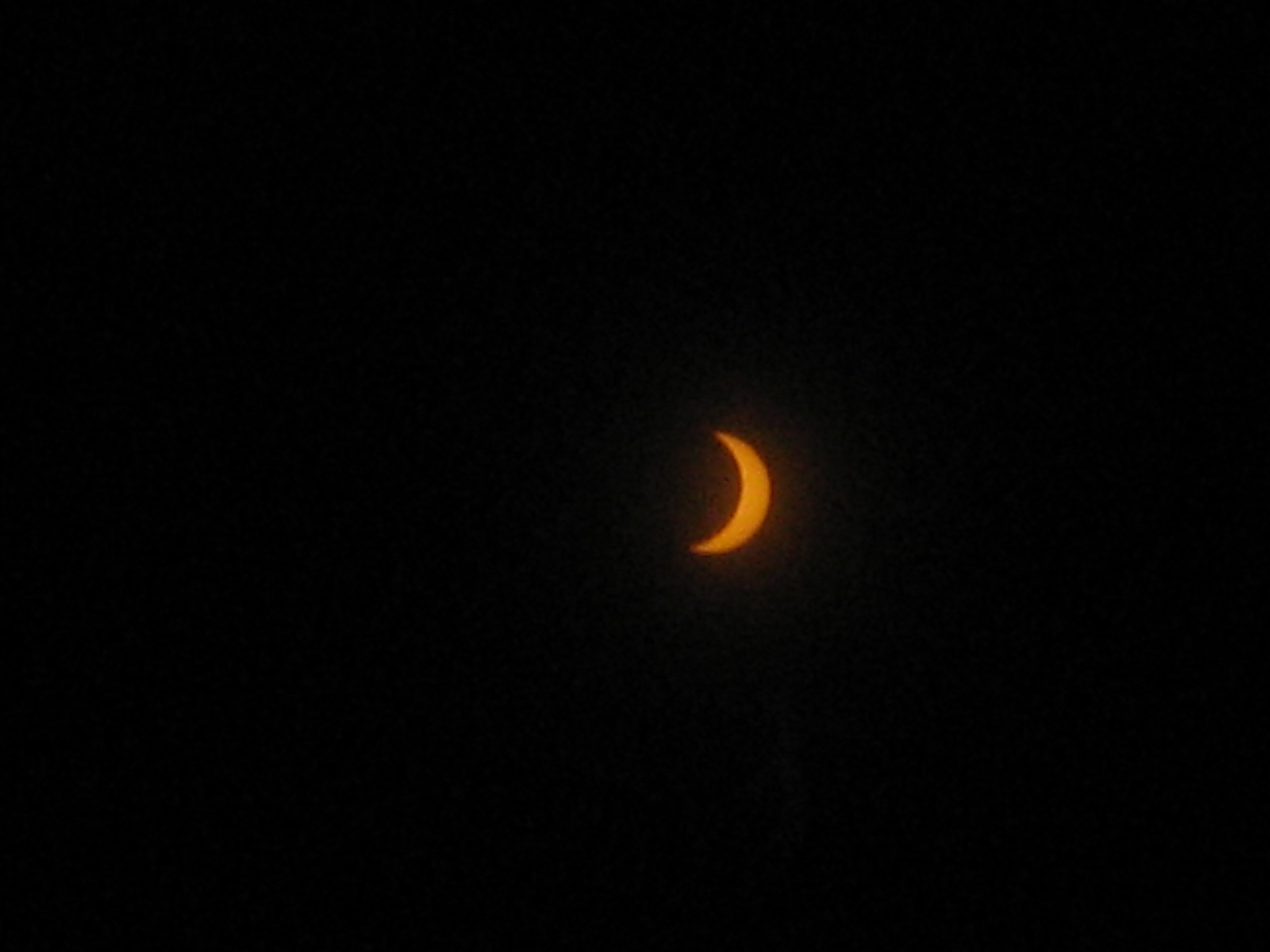
Marousi, Greece (11:01 UTC)

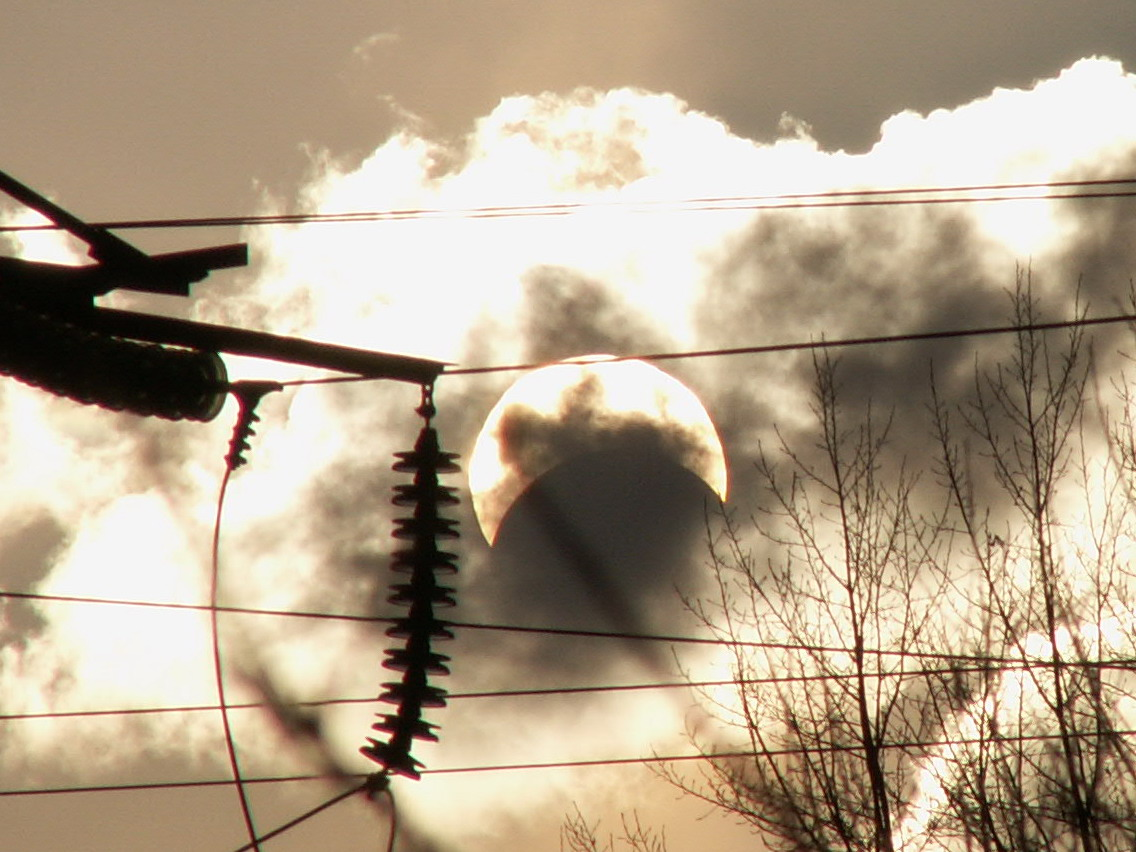
Krasnoyarsk, Russia (11:20 UTC)

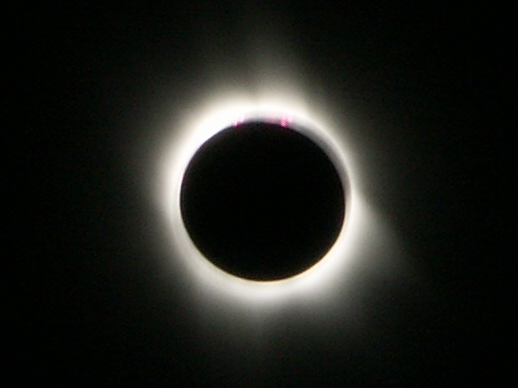
Lagan, Russia (11:23 UTC)

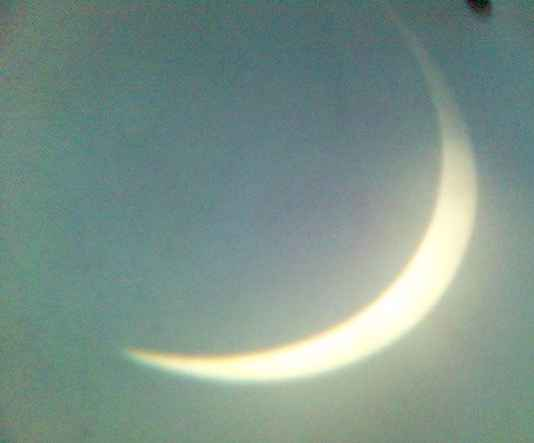
Novosibirsk, Russia (11:42 UTC)

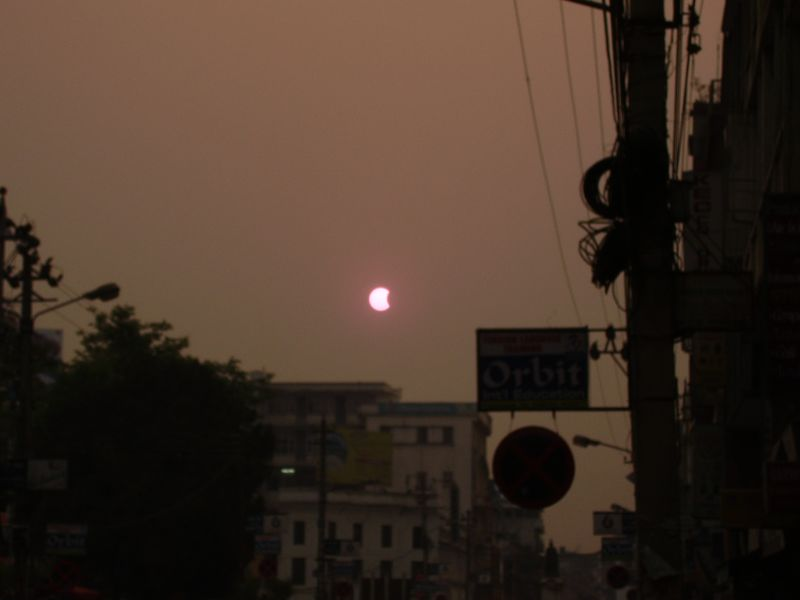
Kathmandu, Nepal (12:01 UTC)

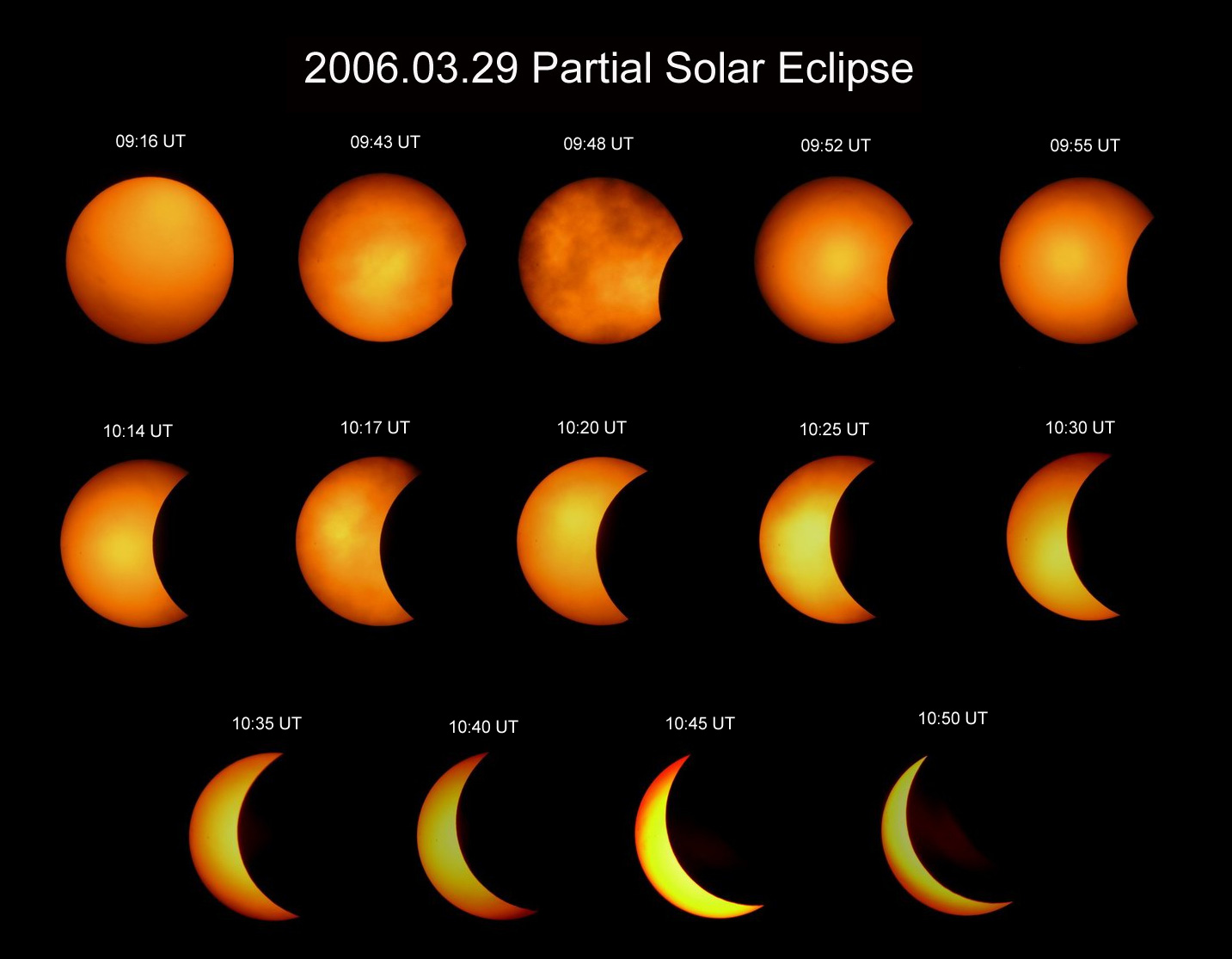
Degania A, Israel: Partial Solar Eclipse

Animation from Sallum, Egypt

== Eclipse details ==
Shown below are two tables displaying details about this particular solar eclipse. The first table outlines times at which the Moon's penumbra or umbra attains the specific parameter, and the second table describes various other parameters pertaining to this eclipse.

March 29, 2006 Solar Eclipse Times
Event	Time (UTC)
First Penumbral External Contact	2006 March 29 at 07:37:53.6 UTC
First Umbral External Contact	2006 March 29 at 08:35:29.4 UTC
First Central Line	2006 March 29 at 08:36:31.5 UTC
First Umbral Internal Contact	2006 March 29 at 08:37:33.6 UTC
First Penumbral Internal Contact	2006 March 29 at 09:45:42.2 UTC
Greatest Eclipse	2006 March 29 at 10:12:22.7 UTC
Greatest Duration	2006 March 29 at 10:12:45.5 UTC
Ecliptic Conjunction	2006 March 29 at 10:16:20.0 UTC
Equatorial Conjunction	2006 March 29 at 10:34:22.4 UTC
Last Penumbral Internal Contact	2006 March 29 at 10:38:33.1 UTC
Last Umbral Internal Contact	2006 March 29 at 11:46:59.6 UTC
Last Central Line	2006 March 29 at 11:48:00.6 UTC
Last Umbral External Contact	2006 March 29 at 11:49:01.5 UTC
Last Penumbral External Contact	2006 March 29 at 12:46:45.7 UTC

March 29, 2006 Solar Eclipse Parameters
Parameter	Value
Eclipse Magnitude	1.05152
Eclipse Obscuration	1.10569
Gamma	0.38433
Sun Right Ascension	00h31m31.7s
Sun Declination	+03°24'10.3"
Sun Semi-Diameter	16'01.1"
Sun Equatorial Horizontal Parallax	08.8"
Moon Right Ascension	00h30m46.6s
Moon Declination	+03°44'36.2"
Moon Semi-Diameter	16'34.9"
Moon Equatorial Horizontal Parallax	1°00'51.4"
ΔT	64.9 s

== Eclipse season ==
This eclipse is part of an eclipse season, a period, roughly every six months, when eclipses occur. Only two (or occasionally three) eclipse seasons occur each year, and each season lasts about 35 days and repeats just short of six months (173 days) later; thus two full eclipse seasons always occur each year. Either two or three eclipses happen each eclipse season. In the sequence below, each eclipse is separated by a fortnight.

Eclipse season of March 2006
March 14 Descending node (full moon)	March 29 Ascending node (new moon)
Penumbral lunar eclipse Lunar Saros 113	Total solar eclipse Solar Saros 139

== Related eclipses ==
=== Eclipses in 2006 ===
- A penumbral lunar eclipse on March 14.
- A total solar eclipse on March 29.
- A partial lunar eclipse on September 7.
- An annular solar eclipse on September 22.

=== Metonic ===
- Preceded by: Solar eclipse of June 10, 2002
- Followed by: Solar eclipse of January 15, 2010

=== Tzolkinex ===
- Preceded by: Solar eclipse of February 16, 1999
- Followed by: Solar eclipse of May 10, 2013

=== Half-Saros ===
- Preceded by: Lunar eclipse of March 24, 1997
- Followed by: Lunar eclipse of April 4, 2015

=== Tritos ===
- Preceded by: Solar eclipse of April 29, 1995
- Followed by: Solar eclipse of February 26, 2017

=== Solar Saros 139 ===
- Preceded by: Solar eclipse of March 18, 1988
- Followed by: Solar eclipse of April 8, 2024

=== Inex ===
- Preceded by: Solar eclipse of April 18, 1977
- Followed by: Solar eclipse of March 9, 2035

=== Triad ===
- Preceded by: Solar eclipse of May 29, 1919
- Followed by: Solar eclipse of January 27, 2093

=== Solar eclipses of 2004–2007 ===
This eclipse is a member of a semester series. An eclipse in a semester series of solar eclipses repeats approximately every 177 days and 4 hours (a semester) at alternating nodes of the Moon's orbit.

Solar eclipse series sets from 2004 to 2007
Ascending node			Descending node		
Saros	Map	Gamma	Saros	Map	Gamma
119	April 19, 2004 Partial	−1.13345	124	October 14, 2004 Partial	1.03481
129 Partial in Naiguatá, Venezuela	April 8, 2005 Hybrid	−0.34733	134 Annularity in Madrid, Spain	October 3, 2005 Annular	0.33058
139 Totality in Side, Turkey	March 29, 2006 Total	0.38433	144 Partial in São Paulo, Brazil	September 22, 2006 Annular	−0.40624
149 Partial in Jaipur, India	March 19, 2007 Partial	1.07277	154 Partial in Córdoba, Argentina	September 11, 2007 Partial	−1.12552

=== Saros 139 ===
This eclipse is a part of Saros series 139, repeating every 18 years, 11 days, and containing 71 events. The series started with a partial solar eclipse on May 17, 1501. It contains hybrid eclipses from August 11, 1627 through December 9, 1825 and total eclipses from December 21, 1843 through March 26, 2601. There are no annular eclipses in this set. The series ends at member 71 as a partial eclipse on July 3, 2763. Its eclipses are tabulated in three columns; every third eclipse in the same column is one exeligmos apart, so they all cast shadows over approximately the same parts of the Earth.

The longest duration of totality will be produced by member 61 at 7 minutes, 29.22 seconds on July 16, 2186. This date is the longest solar eclipse computed between 4000 BC and AD 6000. All eclipses in this series occur at the Moon’s ascending node of orbit.

Series members 18–39 occur between 1801 and 2200:
18	19	20
November 29, 1807	December 9, 1825	December 21, 1843
21	22	23
December 31, 1861	January 11, 1880	January 22, 1898
24	25	26
February 3, 1916	February 14, 1934	February 25, 1952
27	28	29
March 7, 1970	March 18, 1988	March 29, 2006
30	31	32
April 8, 2024	April 20, 2042	April 30, 2060
33	34	35
May 11, 2078	May 22, 2096	June 3, 2114
36	37	38
June 13, 2132	June 25, 2150	July 5, 2168
39
July 16, 2186

=== Metonic series ===
The metonic series repeats eclipses every 19 years (6939.69 days), lasting about 5 cycles. Eclipses occur in nearly the same calendar date. In addition, the octon subseries repeats 1/5 of that or every 3.8 years (1387.94 days). All eclipses in this table occur at the Moon's ascending node.

20 eclipse events between June 10, 1964 and August 21, 2036
June 10–11	March 28–29	January 14–16	November 3	August 21–22
117	119	121	123	125
June 10, 1964	March 28, 1968	January 16, 1972	November 3, 1975	August 22, 1979
127	129	131	133	135
June 11, 1983	March 29, 1987	January 15, 1991	November 3, 1994	August 22, 1998
137	139	141	143	145
June 10, 2002	March 29, 2006	January 15, 2010	November 3, 2013	August 21, 2017
147	149	151	153	155
June 10, 2021	March 29, 2025	January 14, 2029	November 3, 2032	August 21, 2036

=== Tritos series ===
This eclipse is a part of a tritos cycle, repeating at alternating nodes every 135 synodic months (≈ 3986.63 days, or 11 years minus 1 month). Their appearance and longitude are irregular due to a lack of synchronization with the anomalistic month (period of perigee), but groupings of 3 tritos cycles (≈ 33 years minus 3 months) come close (≈ 434.044 anomalistic months), so eclipses are similar in these groupings.

Series members between 1801 and 2200
October 9, 1809 (Saros 121)	September 7, 1820 (Saros 122)	August 7, 1831 (Saros 123)	July 8, 1842 (Saros 124)	June 6, 1853 (Saros 125)
May 6, 1864 (Saros 126)	April 6, 1875 (Saros 127)	March 5, 1886 (Saros 128)	February 1, 1897 (Saros 129)	January 3, 1908 (Saros 130)
December 3, 1918 (Saros 131)	November 1, 1929 (Saros 132)	October 1, 1940 (Saros 133)	September 1, 1951 (Saros 134)	July 31, 1962 (Saros 135)
June 30, 1973 (Saros 136)	May 30, 1984 (Saros 137)	April 29, 1995 (Saros 138)	March 29, 2006 (Saros 139)	February 26, 2017 (Saros 140)
January 26, 2028 (Saros 141)	December 26, 2038 (Saros 142)	November 25, 2049 (Saros 143)	October 24, 2060 (Saros 144)	September 23, 2071 (Saros 145)
August 24, 2082 (Saros 146)	July 23, 2093 (Saros 147)	June 22, 2104 (Saros 148)	May 24, 2115 (Saros 149)	April 22, 2126 (Saros 150)
March 21, 2137 (Saros 151)	February 19, 2148 (Saros 152)	January 19, 2159 (Saros 153)	December 18, 2169 (Saros 154)	November 17, 2180 (Saros 155)
October 18, 2191 (Saros 156)

=== Inex series ===
This eclipse is a part of the long period inex cycle, repeating at alternating nodes, every 358 synodic months (≈ 10,571.95 days, or 29 years minus 20 days). Their appearance and longitude are irregular due to a lack of synchronization with the anomalistic month (period of perigee). However, groupings of 3 inex cycles (≈ 87 years minus 2 months) comes close (≈ 1,151.02 anomalistic months), so eclipses are similar in these groupings.

Series members between 1801 and 2200
August 17, 1803 (Saros 132)	July 27, 1832 (Saros 133)	July 8, 1861 (Saros 134)
June 17, 1890 (Saros 135)	May 29, 1919 (Saros 136)	May 9, 1948 (Saros 137)
April 18, 1977 (Saros 138)	March 29, 2006 (Saros 139)	March 9, 2035 (Saros 140)
February 17, 2064 (Saros 141)	January 27, 2093 (Saros 142)	January 8, 2122 (Saros 143)
December 19, 2150 (Saros 144)	November 28, 2179 (Saros 145)	
