= Solar Saros 139 =

Saros cycle series 139 for solar eclipses

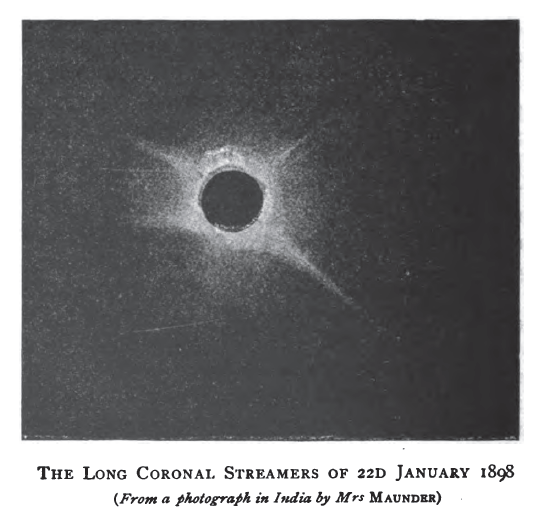
January 22, 1898 Series member 23

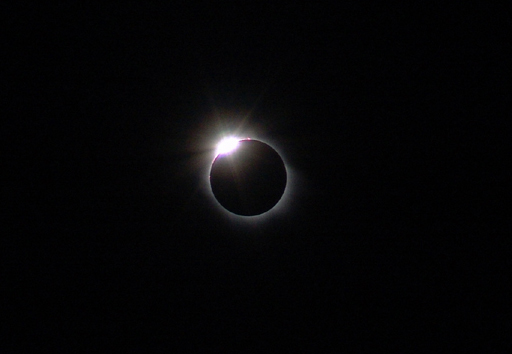
The solar eclipse of March 29, 2006 from Side, Turkey Series member 29

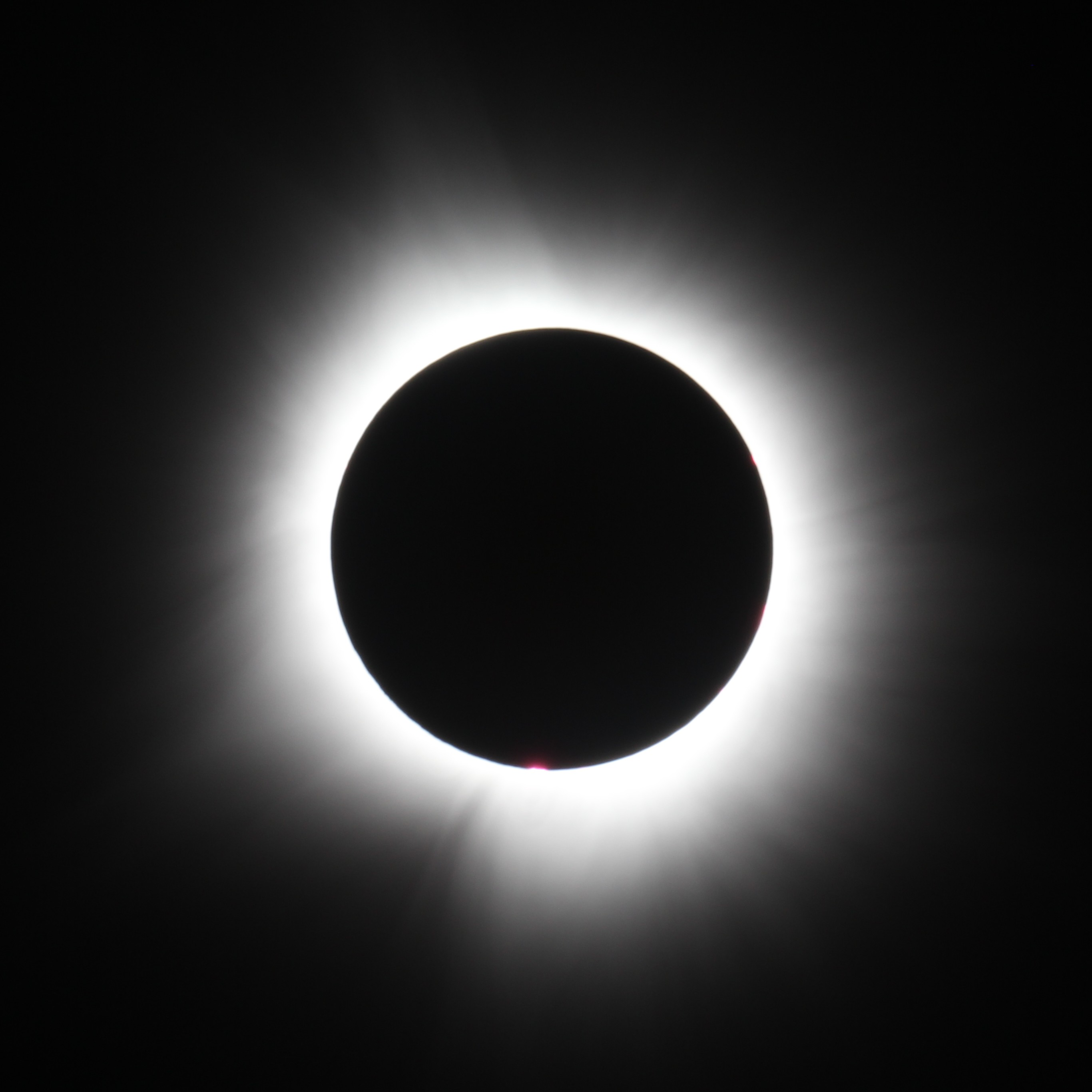
The solar eclipse of April 8, 2024 from Indianapolis, Indiana Series member 30

Historic saros cycle animation

Saros cycle series 139 for solar eclipses occurs at the Moon's ascending node repeating every 18 years and 11 days, containing 71 eclipses, including 55 umbral eclipses, 12 of which are hybrid and 43 of which are total. The first eclipse was on 17 May 1501 and the last will be on 3 July 2763. The most recent eclipse was on 8 April 2024, lasting 4 minutes 28 seconds over central North America, entering in Mexico, crossing the United States, and leaving in eastern Canada, and the next will be on 19–20 April 2042, lasting 4 minutes 51 seconds over the western Pacific Ocean and passing over western Indonesia, eastern Malaysia, Brunei, and the Philippines.

The first total eclipse occurred on December 21, 1843, over southern Asia and lasted 1 minute and 43 seconds. The last total eclipse will occur on March 26, 2601, over Antarctica and the Southern Ocean, lasting 35 seconds.

This series is currently producing total eclipses over 4 minutes long, with each one gradually increasing in length. It will continue to do so until 16 July 2186, when it will produce the longest total eclipse calculated for the ten millennia from 3999 BCE to 6000 CE. Starting on May 11, 2078, Saros 139 will begin producing the longest total eclipses of any series, surpassing those of Solar Saros 136, whose eclipses are getting slightly shorter.

This solar saros is linked to Lunar Saros 132.

== Umbral eclipses ==
Umbral eclipses (annular, total and hybrid) can be further classified as either: 1) Central (two limits), 2) Central (one limit) or 3) Non-Central (one limit). The statistical distribution of these classes in Saros series 139 appears in the following table.

Classification	Number	Percent
All Umbral eclipses	55	100.00%
Central (two limits)	55	100.00%
Central (one limit)	0	0.00%
Non-central (one limit)	0	0.00%

== All eclipses ==
Note: Dates are given in the Julian calendar prior to 15 October 1582, and in the Gregorian calendar after that.

Saros	Member	Date	Time (Greatest) UTC	Type	Location Lat, Long	Gamma	Mag.	Width (km)	Duration (min:sec)	Ref	QLE	Sun altitude
139	1	May 17, 1501	3:27:44	Partial	63.7N 13.6W	1.5002	0.0905				t-	0
139	2	May 28, 1519	10:20:09	Partial	64.6N 126.3W	1.4188	0.2342				t-	0
139	3	June 7, 1537	17:14:05	Partial	65.5N 120.2E	1.3373	0.3796				t-	0
139	4	June 18, 1555	0:07:16	Partial	66.5N 6.6E	1.2542	0.529				t-	0
139	5	June 29, 1573	7:03:36	Partial	67.5N 108.2W	1.1724	0.677				t-	0
139	6	July 20, 1591	14:02:08	Partial	68.5N 136E	1.0911	0.8249				t-	0
139	7	July 30, 1609	21:07:08	Partial	69.5N 17.9E	1.014	0.9657				t-	0
139	8	August 11, 1627	4:17:14	Hybrid	77.7N 173.3W	0.9401	1.0001	1	0m 00s		t-	19
139	9	August 21, 1645	11:34:18	Hybrid	68.2N 43.7E	0.871	1.004	28	0m 16s		t-	29
139	10	September 1, 1663	18:59:08	Hybrid	58.6N 78.9W	0.8073	1.0065	38	0m 29s		p-	36
139	11	September 12, 1681	2:33:12	Hybrid	49.8N 161.1E	0.7504	1.0083	43	0m 40s		p-	41
139	12	September 23, 1699	10:16:12	Hybrid	41.8N 40.7E	0.6999	1.0095	46	0m 49s		p-	45
139	13	October 4, 1717	18:08:27	Hybrid	34.6N 81.1W	0.6563	1.0104	47	0m 56s		p-	49
139	14	October 15, 1735	2:10:34	Hybrid	28.3N 155.2E	0.6202	1.011	48	1m 02s		p-	51
139	15	October 26, 1753	10:22:01	Hybrid	22.7N 29.7E	0.591	1.0115	49	1m 08s		p-	54
139	16	November 6, 1771	18:41:02	Hybrid	17.9N 97.3W	0.5676	1.012	50	1m 13s		p-	55
139	17	November 17, 1789	3:08:35	Hybrid	14.1N 133.9E	0.5504	1.0126	52	1m 19s		p-	57
139	18	November 29, 1807	11:42:09	Hybrid	11.1N 3.9E	0.5377	1.0135	55	1m 26s		p-	57
139	19	December 9, 1825	20:21:45	Hybrid	9.2N 127.4W	0.5296	1.0148	60	1m 34s		p-	58
139	20	December 21, 1843	5:03:26	Total	8N 101E	0.5227	1.0165	66	1m 43s		p-	58
139	21	December 31, 1861	13:49:06	Total	7.8N 31.6W	0.5187	1.0186	74	1m 55s		p-	59
139	22	January 11, 1880	22:34:25	Total	8.3N 164.1W	0.5136	1.0212	84	2m 07s		p-	59
139	23	January 22, 1898	7:19:12	Total	9.5N 63.6E	0.5079	1.0244	96	2m 21s		p-	59
139	24	February 3, 1916	16:00:21	Total	11.1N 67.7W	0.4987	1.028	108	2m 36s		p-	60
139	25	February 14, 1934	0:38:41	Total	13.2N 161.7E	0.4868	1.0321	123	2m 53s		p-	61
139	26	February 25, 1952	9:11:35	Total	15.6N 32.7E	0.4697	1.0366	138	3m 09s		p-	62
139	27	March 7, 1970	17:38:30	Total	18.2N 94.7W	0.4473	1.0414	153	3m 28s		p-	63
139	28	March 18, 1988	1:58:56	Total	20.7N 140E	0.4188	1.0464	169	3m 46s		n-	65
139	29	March 29, 2006	10:12:23	Total	23.2N 16.7E	0.3843	1.0515	184	4m 07s		n-	67
139	30	April 8, 2024	18:18:29	Total	25.3N 104.1W	0.3431	1.0566	198	4m 28s		n-	70
139	31	April 20, 2042	2:17:30	Total	27N 137.3E	0.2956	1.0614	210	4m 51s		n-	73
139	32	April 30, 2060	10:10:00	Total	28N 20.9E	0.2422	1.066	222	5m 15s		n-	76
139	33	May 11, 2078	17:56:55	Total	28.1N 93.7W	0.1838	1.0701	232	5m 40s		n-	79
139	34	May 22, 2096	1:37:14	Total	27.3N 153.4E	0.1196	1.0737	241	6m 07s		nn	83
139	35	June 3, 2114	9:14:09	Total	25.4N 41.3E	0.0525	1.0766	248	6m 32s		nn	87
139	36	June 13, 2132	16:46:24	Total	22.3N 70.1W	-0.0186	1.0788	255	6m 55s		nn	89
139	37	June 25, 2150	0:17:25	Total	18.3N 178.1E	-0.091	1.0802	260	7m 14s		nn	85
139	38	July 5, 2168	7:45:23	Total	13.2N 66.4E	-0.166	1.0807	264	7m 26s		-n	81
139	39	July 16, 2186	15:14:54	Total	7.4N 46.5W	-0.2396	1.0805	267	7m 29s		-n	76
139	40	July 27, 2204	22:44:32	Total	1N 160.1W	-0.3129	1.0793	269	7m 22s		-n	72
139	41	August 8, 2222	6:17:05	Total	6S 84.9E	-0.3837	1.0774	270	7m 06s		-n	67
139	42	August 18, 2240	13:52:25	Total	13.3S 31.3W	-0.4522	1.0746	270	6m 40s		-p	63
139	43	August 29, 2258	21:33:05	Total	20.9S 149.2W	-0.5161	1.0712	269	6m 09s		-p	59
139	44	September 9, 2276	5:18:47	Total	28.5S 91.2E	-0.5755	1.0671	266	5m 33s		-p	55
139	45	September 20, 2294	13:09:58	Total	36.2S 29.9W	-0.63	1.0627	263	4m 56s		-p	51
139	46	October 1, 2312	21:08:26	Total	43.8S 152.9W	-0.6783	1.0578	258	4m 20s		-p	47
139	47	October 13, 2330	5:13:41	Total	51.2S 82.5E	-0.7208	1.0528	251	3m 46s		-p	44
139	48	October 23, 2348	13:26:56	Total	58.2S 43.6W	-0.7564	1.0476	242	3m 14s		-p	41
139	49	November 3, 2366	21:46:04	Total	64.8S 170.2W	-0.7868	1.0426	231	2m 46s		-p	38
139	50	November 14, 2384	6:13:20	Total	70.9S 63.5E	-0.8102	1.0377	217	2m 22s		-p	36
139	51	November 25, 2402	14:45:41	Total	76.2S 59.6W	-0.8291	1.0332	202	2m 02s		-p	34
139	52	December 5, 2420	23:23:52	Total	80.2S 174W	-0.8431	1.029	185	1m 44s		-p	32
139	53	December 17, 2438	8:05:40	Total	81.7S 84.3E	-0.8539	1.0254	168	1m 30s		-p	31
139	54	December 27, 2456	16:51:25	Total	79.8S 22W	-0.8614	1.0222	151	1m 19s		-p	30
139	55	January 7, 2475	1:37:52	Total	76.2S 141.8W	-0.8679	1.0196	136	1m 10s		-p	29
139	56	January 18, 2493	10:24:30	Total	72.2S 90.8E	-0.8742	1.0174	123	1m 02s		-p	29
139	57	January 30, 2511	19:09:33	Total	68.1S 39.5W	-0.8816	1.0157	114	0m 57s		-p	28
139	58	February 10, 2529	3:52:31	Total	64.3S 170.7W	-0.8908	1.0143	108	0m 53s		-p	27
139	59	February 21, 2547	12:29:30	Total	61.1S 59.6E	-0.9046	1.0132	106	0m 50s		-p	25
139	60	March 3, 2565	21:01:39	Total	58.7S 68.8W	-0.922	1.0121	107	0m 46s		-t	22
139	61	March 15, 2583	5:25:52	Total	57.4S 166.2E	-0.9456	1.0109	115	0m 42s		-t	19
139	62	March 26, 2601	13:43:55	Total	58S 45.6E	-0.974	1.0091	142	0m 35s		-t	12
139	63	April 6, 2619	21:51:02	Partial	61.2S 60.7W	-1.0108	0.9781				-t	0
139	64	April 17, 2637	5:51:33	Partial	61.6S 170.8E	-1.0525	0.9013				-t	0
139	65	April 28, 2655	13:40:56	Partial	62S 45.1E	-1.1024	0.8094				-t	0
139	66	May 8, 2673	21:23:23	Partial	62.7S 79.1W	-1.1574	0.708				-t	0
139	67	May 20, 2691	4:55:09	Partial	63.4S 159.1E	-1.2203	0.5922				-t	0
139	68	May 31, 2709	12:21:17	Partial	64.2S 38.6E	-1.2869	0.4697				-t	0
139	69	June 11, 2727	19:39:01	Partial	65.2S 80.2W	-1.359	0.3372				-t	0
139	70	June 22, 2745	2:51:30	Partial	66.1S 162E	-1.4345	0.1992				-t	0
139	71	July 3, 2763	9:58:23	Partial	67.1S 45.2E	-1.5132	0.0562				-t	0
