= Kynosarion =

Coastal town of ancient Pamphylia

Coordinates: 36°51′45″N 31°06′10″E

Kynosarion was a coastal town of ancient Pamphylia, inhabited during Roman times.

Its site is located between Magydos and Side, in Asiatic Turkey.
