= Helladius (grammarian) =

Helladius (Greek: Έλλάδιος) was a Byzantine period grammarian, professor, and a priest of Zeus during the 4th and 5th centuries.

Helladius was a professor of some distinction in Alexandria. In 391, he was involved in a violent revolt centred at the Serapeum, where the pagan rebels tortured and killed captured Christians, with Helladius reportedly personally killing nine Christians. After the suppression of the revolt and the destruction of the temple, Helladius fled to Constantinople,

By the reign of Theodosius II (408–450 A.D.), he was back to actively teaching grammar. Socrates of Constantinople in his youth was one of his pupils. (Note: Socrates of Constantinople, Historia Ecclesiastica, v. 16.) Helladius was granted comitiva ordinis primi by this emperor in 425 A.D., by virtue of which he became ranked among the ex vicarii. (Note: Codex Theodosianus VI, xxi.)

Helladius compiled a Greek lexicon entitled λεξικὸν κατὰ στοιχεῖου (Note: Photonius, codex 145.) or τῶν λέξεων συλλογή (Note: Photonius, Bibl. 158, p. 100a. 38 ed. Bekker, cited by Smith, Davids.) according to Photius; elsewhere it is stated the lexicon bore the title λέξεως παντοίας χρῆσις κατα στοῖχειον. (Note: Called this by Suda according to Smith, but this too is given by Photonius, codex 165, according to Davids.) Helladius was one of the important sources used by the Suda as well.
