= Solar eclipse of September 23, 1699 =

17th-century total solar eclipse

- Hybrid eclipse
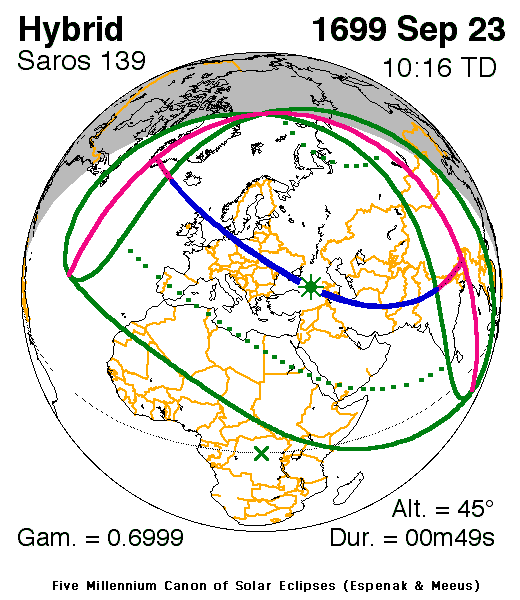
- Map
- Gamma: 0.6999
- Magnitude: 1.0095

Maximum eclipse
- Duration: 49 s (0 min 49 s)
- Coordinates: 41.8°N 40.7°E
- Max. width of band: 46 km (29 mi)

Times (UTC)
- Greatest eclipse: 10:16:12

References
- Saros: 139 (12 of 71)
- Catalog # (SE5000): 8786

A hybrid solar eclipse occurred on September 23, 1699. A solar eclipse occurs when the Moon passes between Earth and the Sun, thereby totally or partly obscuring the image of the Sun for a viewer on Earth. A total solar eclipse occurs when the Moon's apparent diameter is larger than the Sun's, blocking all direct sunlight, turning day into darkness. Totality occurs in a narrow path across Earth's surface, with the partial solar eclipse visible over a surrounding region thousands of kilometres wide.

A narrow path of totality just clipped the north-east corner of Scotland, including Wick.

Giovanni Domenico Cassini produced the first ever map of a solar eclipse for this event, showing the line of centrality, partial eclipse, and the limits of the eclipse. In Scotland, the eclipse was total to the north of Caithness for a brief interval, and a near total eclipse was observed in Edinburgh. From England, Samuel Pepys noted an eclipse of the Sun, although it was dated September 3, 1699. The total eclipse was recorded from the Crimean peninsula by a Jewish rabbi named Debar Śepatayim, who interpreted it as a sign. Coincidentally, 1699 marked the final year of the Maunder Minimum.

== See also ==
- List of solar eclipses visible from the United Kingdom
