= Marcellus of Side =

Marcellus of Side (Ancient Greek: Μάρκελλος Σιδήτης, Marcellus Sidetes; 2nd century) a native of Side in Pamphylia, was a physician born towards the end of the 1st century AD, and lived during the reigns of Hadrian and Antoninus Pius, 117–161 AD. He wrote a long medical poem in Greek hexameter verse, consisting of forty-two books, which was held in such estimation, that it was ordered by the emperors to be placed in the public libraries at Rome. Of this work only two fragments remain, one Περὶ Λυκανθρώπου, De Lycanthropia, and the other Ἰατρικὰ περὶ Ἰχθύων, De Remediis ex Piscibus. Of these the former is preserved (but in prose) by Aëtius of Amida. The second fragment consists of about 100 verses.

According to the Greek Anthology, Marcellus was very famous and honored. His books were presented to the public library in Rome. In his hometown of Side, he served as municipal physician.

== Bibliography ==
- Nollé, Johannes (2015). "Ein Fehler mit Folgen: Marcellus von Side, ein Leibarzt des Kaisers Hadrian?" In: Gephyra, vol. 12, pp. 245–249.
- Πλουτάρχου περί τῆς τῶν ἐλευθέρων παιδῶν ἀγωγῆς. Accedunt bina ejusdem Plutarchi et Marcelli Sidetae medici fragmenta Graece, recensuit Joh. G. Schneider. Argentorati, Strassburg, 1775.
