= Amphilochius of Sida =

Amphilochius of Sida (or Side, located in Pamphylia.) was a bishop of the first half of the fifth century, member of the Council of Ephesus (432), where he vigorously opposed the Messalians and subscribed to the condemnation and deposition of Nestorius.

He does not seem to have been equally firm at a later period. Even if he did not assist at the "Robber Council" of Ephesus (449), he showed great sympathy for Dioscorus of Alexandria at the Council of Chalcedon, and consented with reluctance to his condemnation.

He subscribed to the "tomus" of Pope Leo, and the canons of Chalcedon, although later he wrote to the Emperor Leo I (458) that he did not acknowledge the authority of that council. Photius quotes (Bibl. Cod., 230) Eulogius of Alexandria (579-607) in evidence of a later acceptance and subscription by Amphilochius. Only one brief letter-fragment has reached us (P.G., LXXVII, 1515–16).
