= Temple of Apollo (Side) =

Roman temple in Turkey

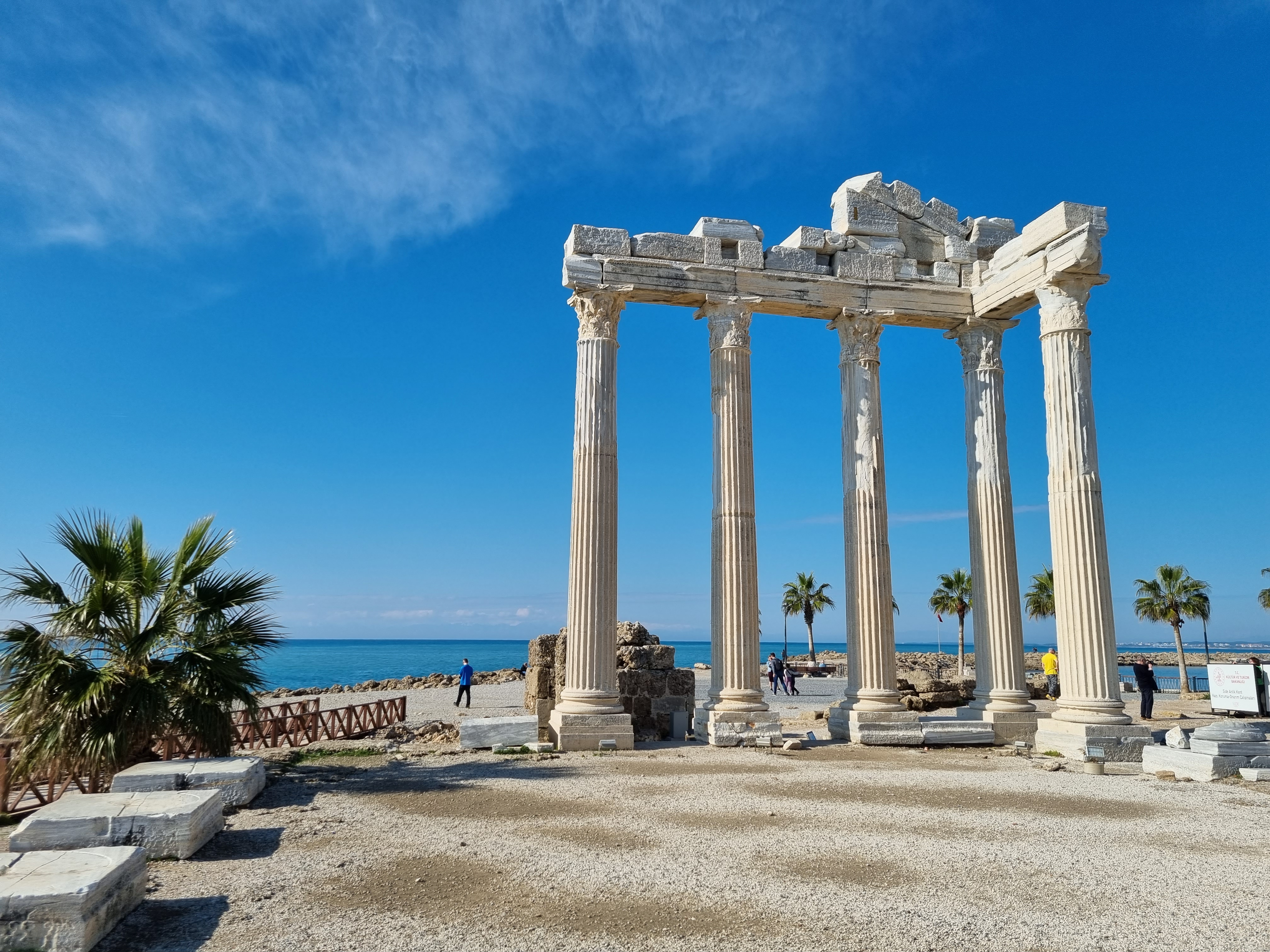
- Temple of Apollo in Side, Turkey

- Location of the Temple of Apollo in Turkey

Religion
- Region: Pamphylia
- Deity: Apollo
- Ecclesiastical or organisational status: Ruins

Location
- Location: Side, Turkey
- Coordinates: 36°45′51″N 31°23′11″E

Architecture
- Style: Roman, Corinthian

The Temple of Apollo (Turkish: Apollon Tapınağı) is a Roman temple built around 150 A.D. during the Pax Romana era in the ancient Pamphylian town of Side, in southern Turkey on the Mediterranean Sea coast and dedicated to Apollo, the Greek and Roman god of music, harmony and light, inter alia.

The Temple of Apollo dates back to the time of Roman emperor Antoninus Pius (r. 138–161).

Between 1984 and 1990, the five columns, which remained standing side by side over centuries, and the capitals were restored. As the concrete base carrying the columns started to wear down, and the iron bars inside the columns came to the surface effected by weather conditions, restoration works were carried out in 2017. The broken parts of the columns were repaired with same material used during the restoration in the 1980s.

The Temple of Apollo is a notable tourist attraction in Antalya Province.

== Recent events ==
In May 2022, a night club named "Apollo" was opened nearby the archaeological site of the adjacent Temple of Athena, using historical remains as its entrance gate. The club started operating despite the complaints and warnings of archaeologists that lighting and loud noise would cause damage to the ongoing excavation works and pose a catastrophic effect for the surrounding monuments.

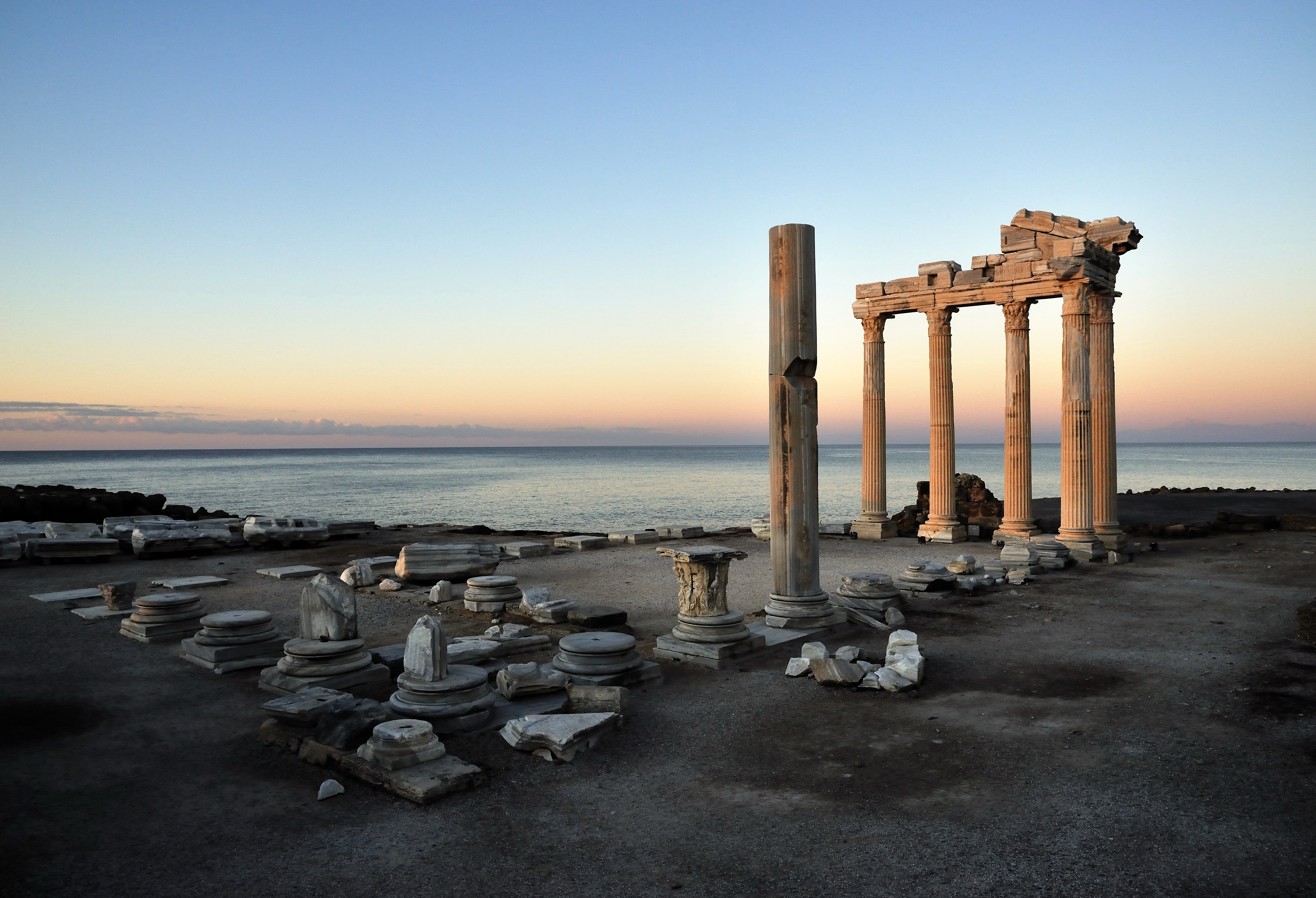
A panoramic view of The Temple of Apollo, Side.
