= Troilus (sophist) =

Troilus of Constantinople (Ancient Greek: Τρώϊλος) was a sophist from Side in Pamphylia of the late 4th and early 5th century. He taught in Constantinople. He wrote 7 books.

== Bibliography ==
- Martindale, John R., ed. (1980). The Prosopography of the Later Roman Empire: Volume II, AD 395–527. Cambridge: Cambridge University Press. p. 1128. ISBN 0-521-20159-4.
