= Side, Turkey =

Town in Turkey

Side
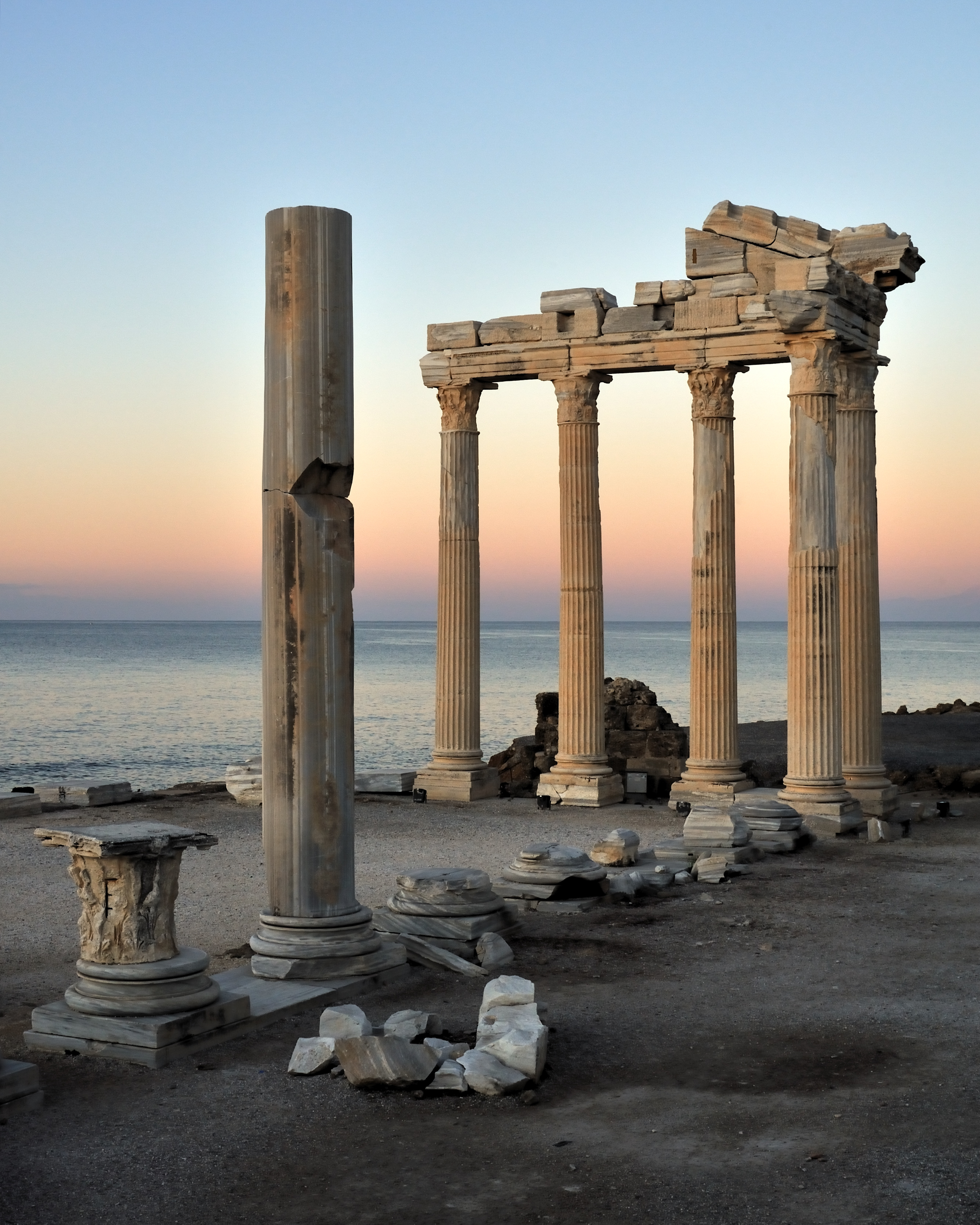
- The Temple of Apollo is located at the end of Side's peninsula.

- Location within Turkey
- 36°46′00″N 31°23′20″E
- Type: Settlement
- Cultures: Greek, Roman, Byzantine
- Location: Antalya Province, Turkey
- Region: Pamphylia

History
- Built: 7th century BCE

Site notes
- Condition: In ruin

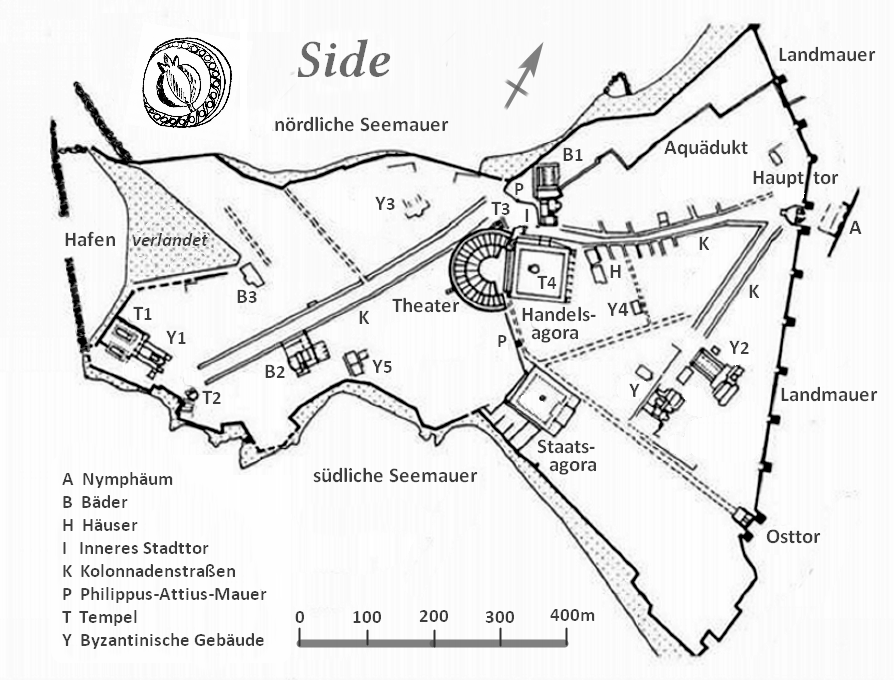
Plan of Roman Side

Side (formerly Selimiye) is a city on the southern Mediterranean coast of Turkey. It includes the modern resort town and the ruins of the ancient city of Side, one of the best-known classical sites in the country. Modern Side is a neighbourhood of the municipality and district of Manavgat, Antalya Province, Turkey. Its population is 14,527 (2022). Before the 2013 reorganisation, it was a town (belde). It lies near Manavgat, 78 km from Antalya.

It is located on the eastern part of the Pamphylian coast, which lies about 20 km east of the mouth of the Eurymedon River. Today, as in antiquity, the ancient city is situated on a small north-south peninsula about 1 km long and 400 m across.

== History ==
=== Iron Age ===
Pseudo-Scylax, Strabo and Arrian record that Side was founded by Greek settlers from Cyme in Aeolis, a region of western Anatolia. This most likely occurred in the 7th century BC. A basalt column base from the 7th century BC found in the excavations and attributable to the Neo-Hittites is evidence of the site's early history.

Possessing a good harbour for small craft, Side's natural geography made it one of the most important trade centres in the region.

Its tutelary deity was Athena, whose head adorned its coinage.

Excavations have revealed several inscriptions written in the language of Side. The inscriptions, dating from the 3rd and 2nd centuries BC, remain undeciphered, but testify that the local language was still in use several centuries after colonisation.

=== Classical Age ===
==== Hellenistic period ====
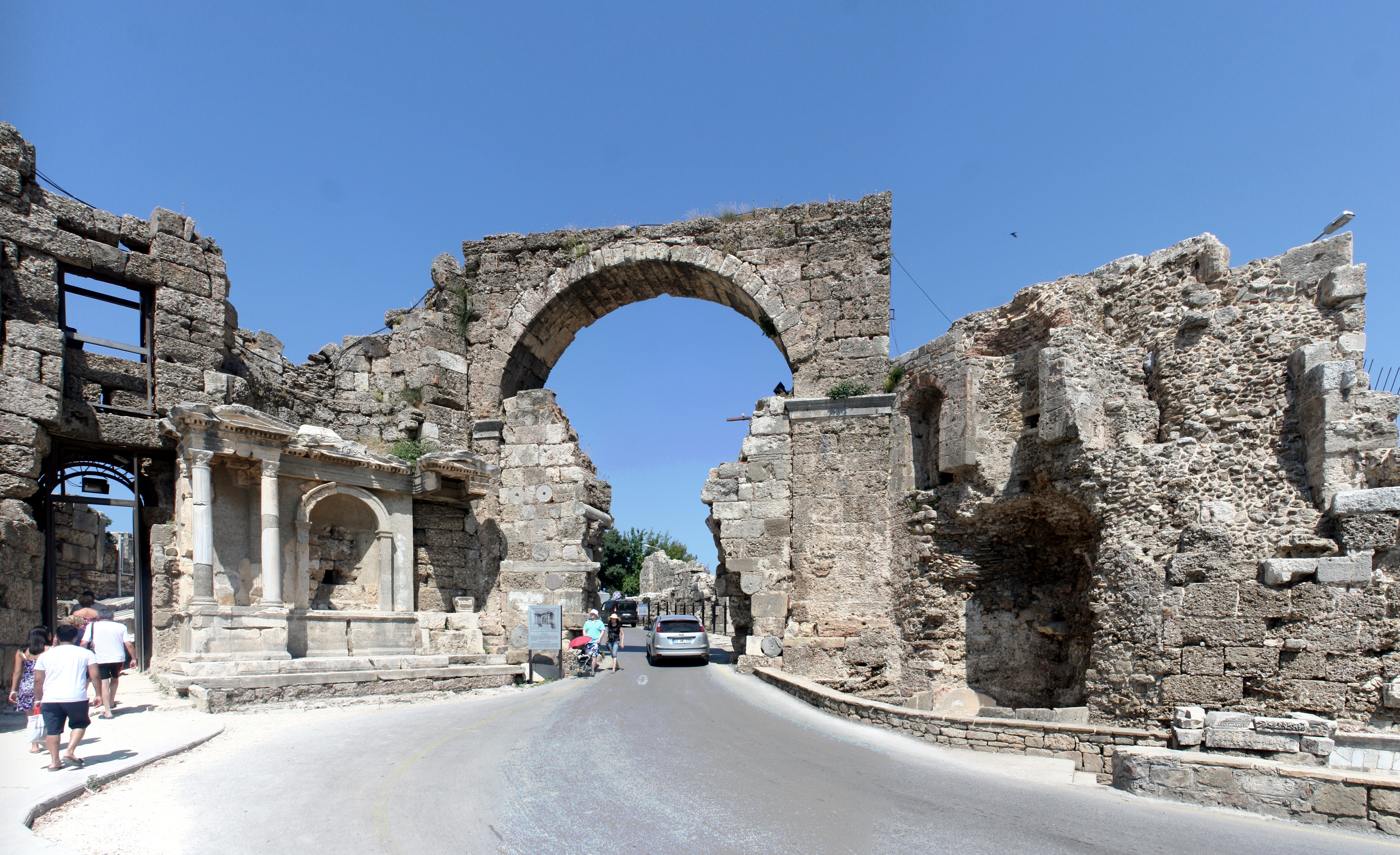
Vespasian Gate

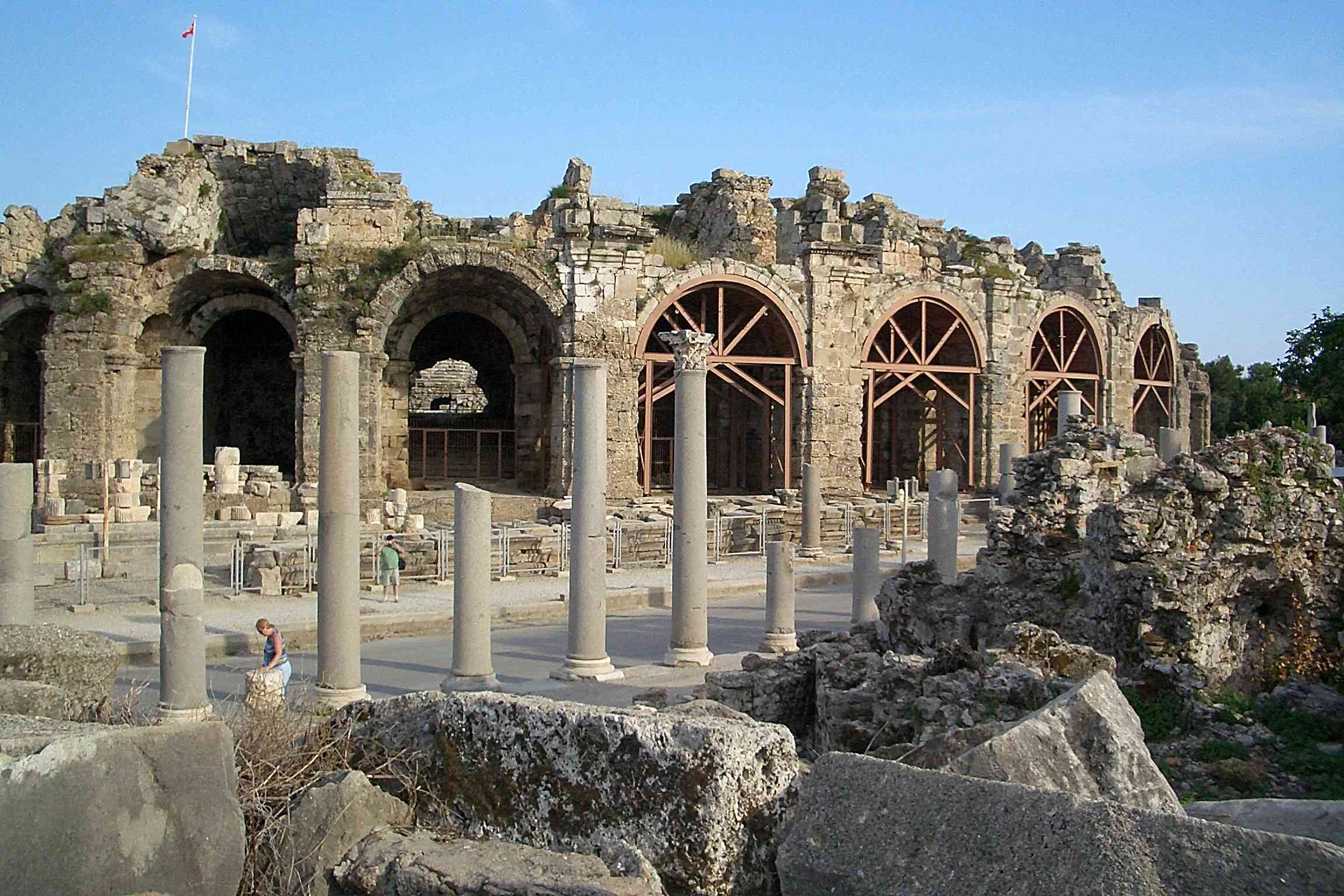
The ancient theatre

Alexander the Great occupied Side without a struggle in 333 BC. Alexander left only a single garrison behind to occupy the city. This occupation, in turn, introduced the people of Side to Hellenistic culture, which flourished from the 4th to the 1st century BC. After Alexander's death, Side fell under the control of one of Alexander's generals, Ptolemy I Soter, who declared himself king of Egypt in 305 BC. The Ptolemaic dynasty controlled Side until it was captured by the Seleucid Empire in the 2nd century BC. Yet, despite these occupations, Side managed to preserve some autonomy, grew prosperous, and became an important cultural centre.

In 190 BC a fleet from the Greek island city-state of Rhodes, supported by Rome and Pergamum, defeated the Seleucid King Antiochus the Great's fleet, which was under the command of the fugitive Carthaginian general Hannibal. The defeat of Hannibal and Antiochus the Great meant that Side freed itself from the overlord-ship of the Seleucid Empire.

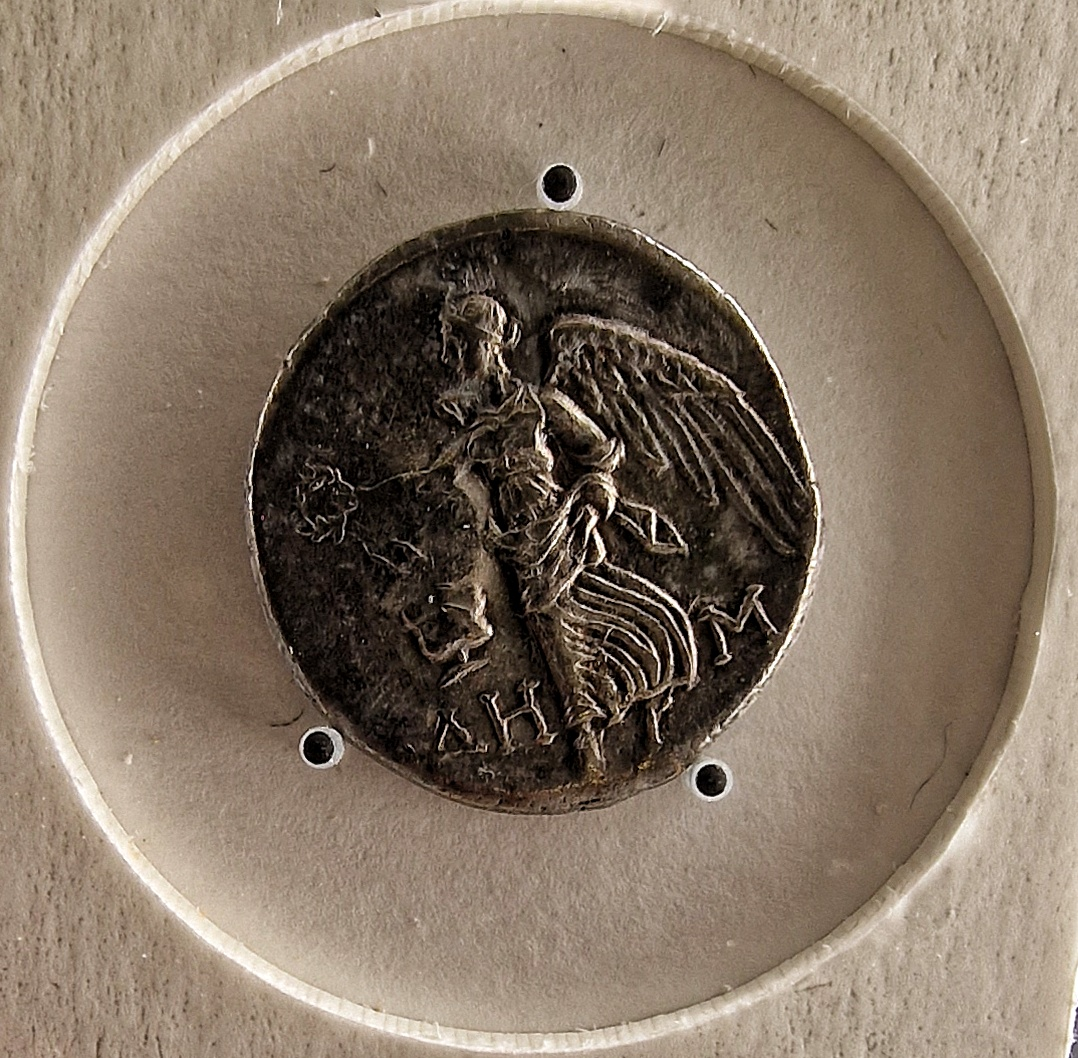
Tetradrachm from Side, 201–190 BC, depicting winged Victory. Now in Palais de Rumine, Lausanne, Switzerland.

The Treaty of Apamea (188 BC) forced Antiochus to abandon all European territories and to cede all of Asia Minor north of the Taurus Mountains to Pergamum. However, the dominion of Pergamum only reached de facto as far as Perga, leaving Eastern Pamphylia in a state of uncertain freedom. This led Attalus II Philadelphus to construct a new harbour in the city of Attalia (the present Antalya), although Side already possessed an important harbour of its own. Between 188 and 36 BC Side minted its own money, tetradrachms showing Nike and a laurel wreath (the sign of victory).

In the 1st century BC, Side reached a peak when the Cilician pirates established their chief naval base and a centre for their slave-trade.

==== Roman period ====
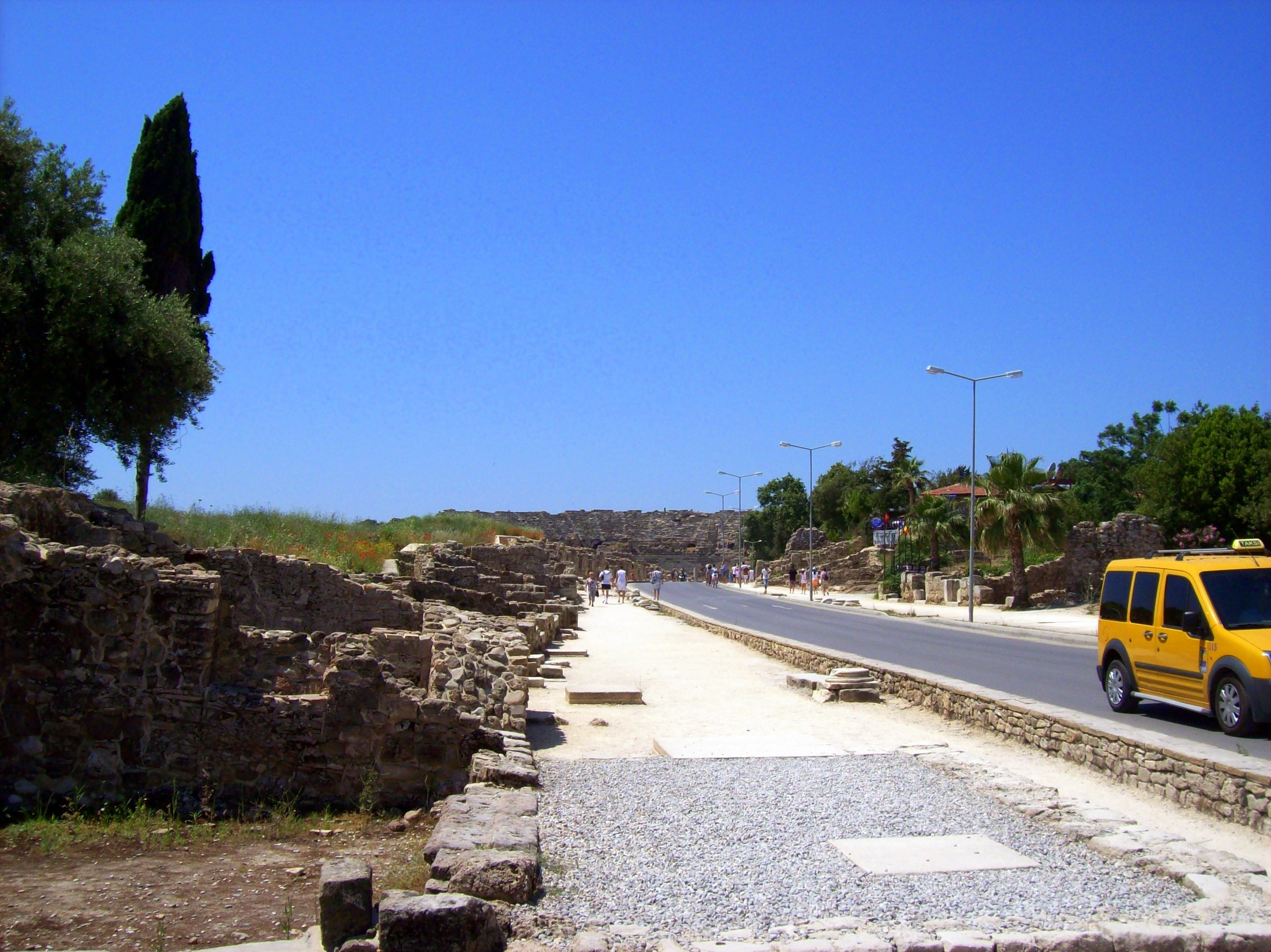
The main street is lined with the ruins of homes or shops, many of which feature their original mosaic flooring.

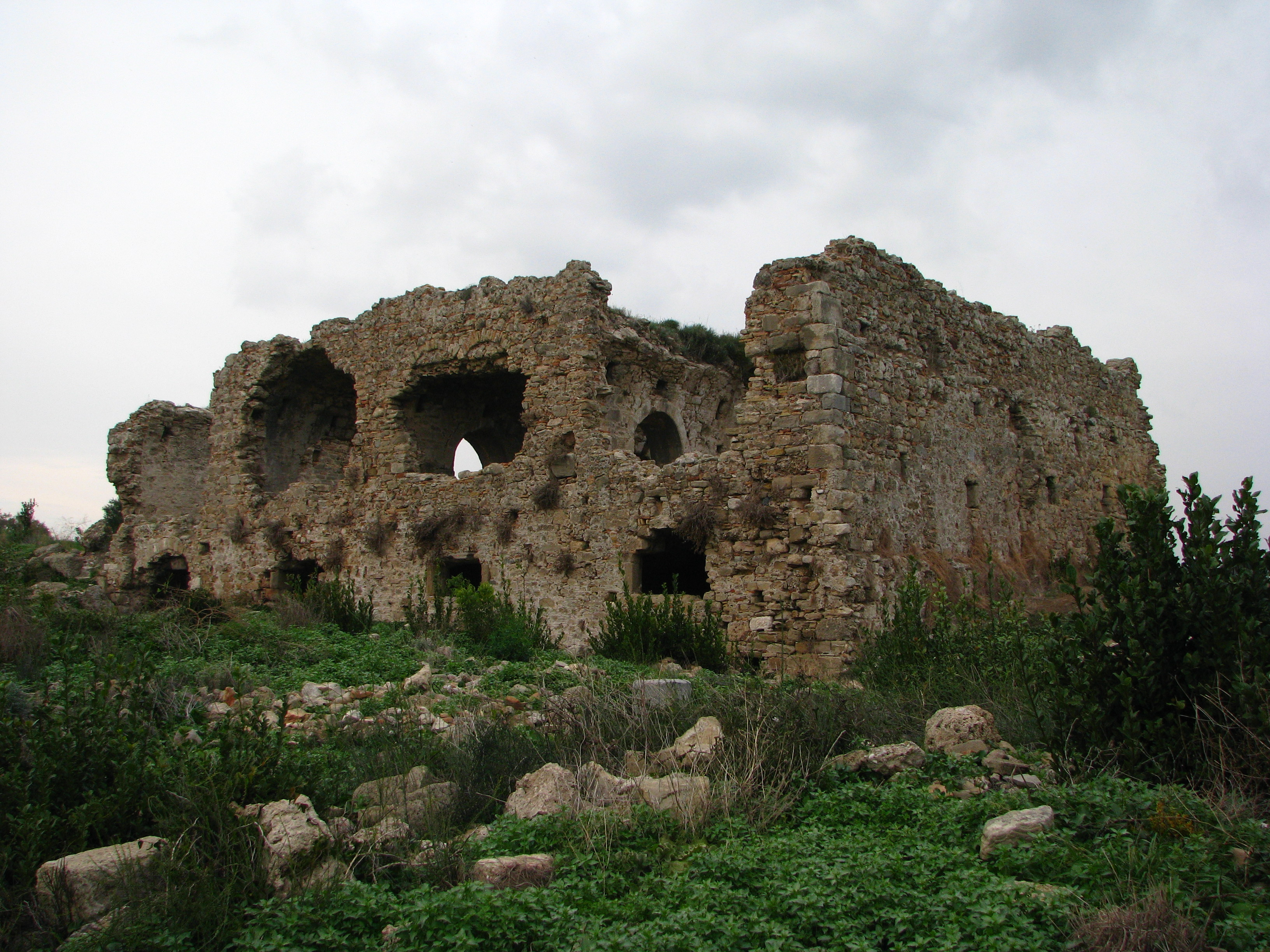
Hospital dating back to the 6th century

The consul Servilius Vatia defeated these brigands in 78 BC and later the Roman general Pompey in 67 BC, bringing Side under the control of Rome and beginning its second period of ascendancy, when it established and maintained a good working relationship with the Roman Empire.

Emperor Augustus reformed the state administration and placed Pamphylia and Side in the Roman province of Galatia in 25 BC, after the short reign of Amyntas of Galatia between 36 and 25 BC. Side began another prosperous period as a commercial centre in Asia Minor through its trade in olive oil. Its population grew to 60,000 inhabitants. This period would last well into the 3rd century AD. Side also established itself as a slave-trading centre in the Mediterranean. Its large commercial fleet engaged in acts of piracy, while wealthy merchants paid for such tributes as public works, monuments, and competitions as well as the games and gladiator fights. Most of the extant ruins at Side date from this period of prosperity.

Side was the home of Eustathius of Antioch, of the philosopher Troilus, of the fifth-century ecclesiastical writer Philip; of the famous lawyer Tribonian.

=== Decline ===
Side began a steady decline from the 4th century on. Even defensive walls could not stop successive invasions of highlanders from the Taurus Mountains. During the 5th and 6th centuries, Side experienced a revival, and became the seat of the Bishopric of Eastern Pamphylia. Arab fleets, nevertheless, raided and burned Side during the 7th century, contributing to its decline. The combination of earthquakes, Christian zealots and Arab raids, left the site abandoned by the 10th century, its citizens having emigrated to nearby Attalia.

In the 12th century, Side temporarily established itself once more as a large city. An inscription found on the site of the former ancient city shows a considerable Jewish population in early Byzantine times. However, Side was abandoned again after being sacked. Its population moved to Attaleia, and Side became known as Eski Adalia (Old Antalya) and was buried.

== Ecclesiastical history ==
As capital of the Roman province of Pamphylia Prima, Side was ecclesiastically the metropolitan see. The earliest known bishop was Epidaurus, presiding at the Synod of Ancyra, 314. Others are John, fourth century; Eustathius, 381; Amphilochius, 426-458, who played an important part in the history of the time; Conon, 536; Peter, 553; John, 680-692; Mark, 879; Theodore, 1027-1028; Anthimus, present at the synod held at Constantinople in 1054; John, then counsellor to the Emperor Michael VII Doukas, presided at a council on the worship of images, 1082; Theodosius and his successor Nicetas, twelfth century. John, present at a synod at Constantinople in 1156.

In 1315 Side assumed the administration of the neighboring metropolis of Syllaion and the archbishopric of Leontopolis, since all three churches were in decline due to Turkoman conquests:

It has been a long time since there was a metropolitan in the metropolitanate of Side, and the reason is that the terrible [state of affairs] prevailed to such an extent, and the road leading there became unsafe as the result of the attacks of the foreign peoples.

The Notitiae Episcopatuum continued to mention Side as a metropolis of Pamphylia until the 13th century. It does not appear in the "Notitiae" of Andronikos III Palaiologos. In 1369 Side temporarily assumed the administration of the metropolis of Rhodes and the Cyclades. In 1397, the diocese was united with that of Attaleia under the metropolitan Theophylact. The reason for the decision is thus given:

Since Side was captured long ago, there has been a scarcity of the faithful and poverty of the ecclesiastical property. And because of these things it is not at all possible to ordain a legitimate metropolitan there.

In 1400, Theophylact, who was the metropolitan of Attaleia-Perge and the administrator of Side, assumed the metropolitanates of Sougdaia and Phoulloi, because he was "forced to abandon his church in southern Asia Minor". Further records include the oppression of the church by the Turkomans, and the decline in the number of Christians.

No longer a residential see, Side is today included in the Catholic Church's list of titular sees.

== Monuments and Site ==
The great ruins are among the most notable in Asia Minor. They cover a large promontory which a wall and a moat separate from the mainland. Archaeologists have been excavating Side since 1947 and intermittently continue to do so.

The colossal theatre complex of the 2nd century is less well-preserved than that of Aspendos and is currently being restored. It is almost as large, seating 15,000–20,000 people. It was converted into an open-air sanctuary with two chapels during Byzantine times (5th or 6th century).

The well-preserved city walls provide an entrance to the site through the Hellenistic main gate (Megale Pyle) from the 2nd century BC.

The colonnaded street had marble columns whose remains can be seen near the Roman baths, restored as a museum displaying statues and sarcophagi from the Roman period. The agora includes the remains of the round Tyche and Fortuna temple (2nd century BC), peripteral with twelve columns, in the centre. In later times it was used as a trading centre where pirates sold slaves.

The early Roman Temple of Dionysus is near the theatre. The fountain gracing the entrance is restored. At the left side is a Byzantine Basilica.

Other buildings include three temples and a nymphaeum, a grotto or fountain building of elaborate design, and a synagogue which was discovered under a modern place of residence.

Excavation teams also found an ancient Greek brothel.

=== The aqueduct ===
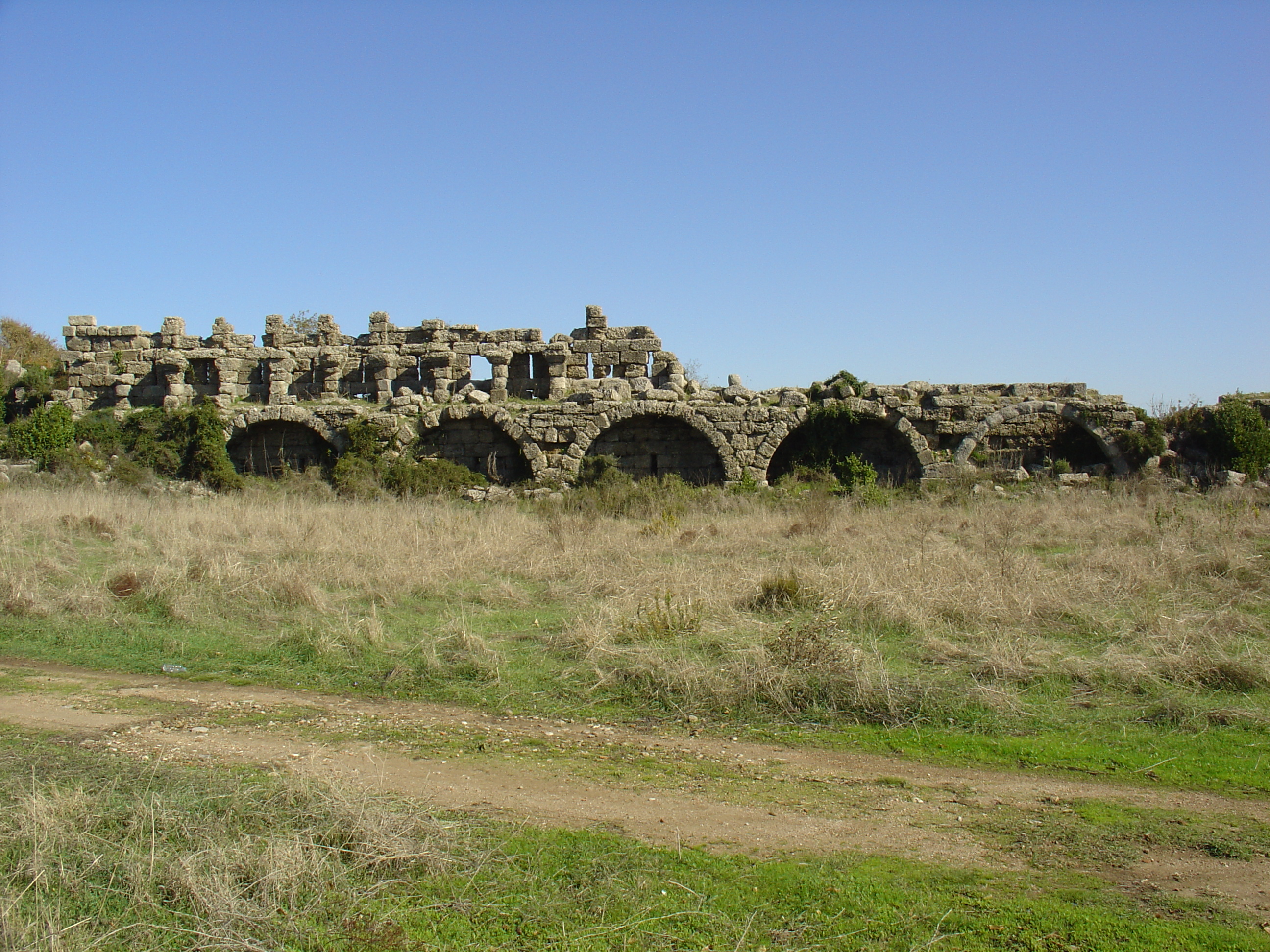
Aqueduct near Side

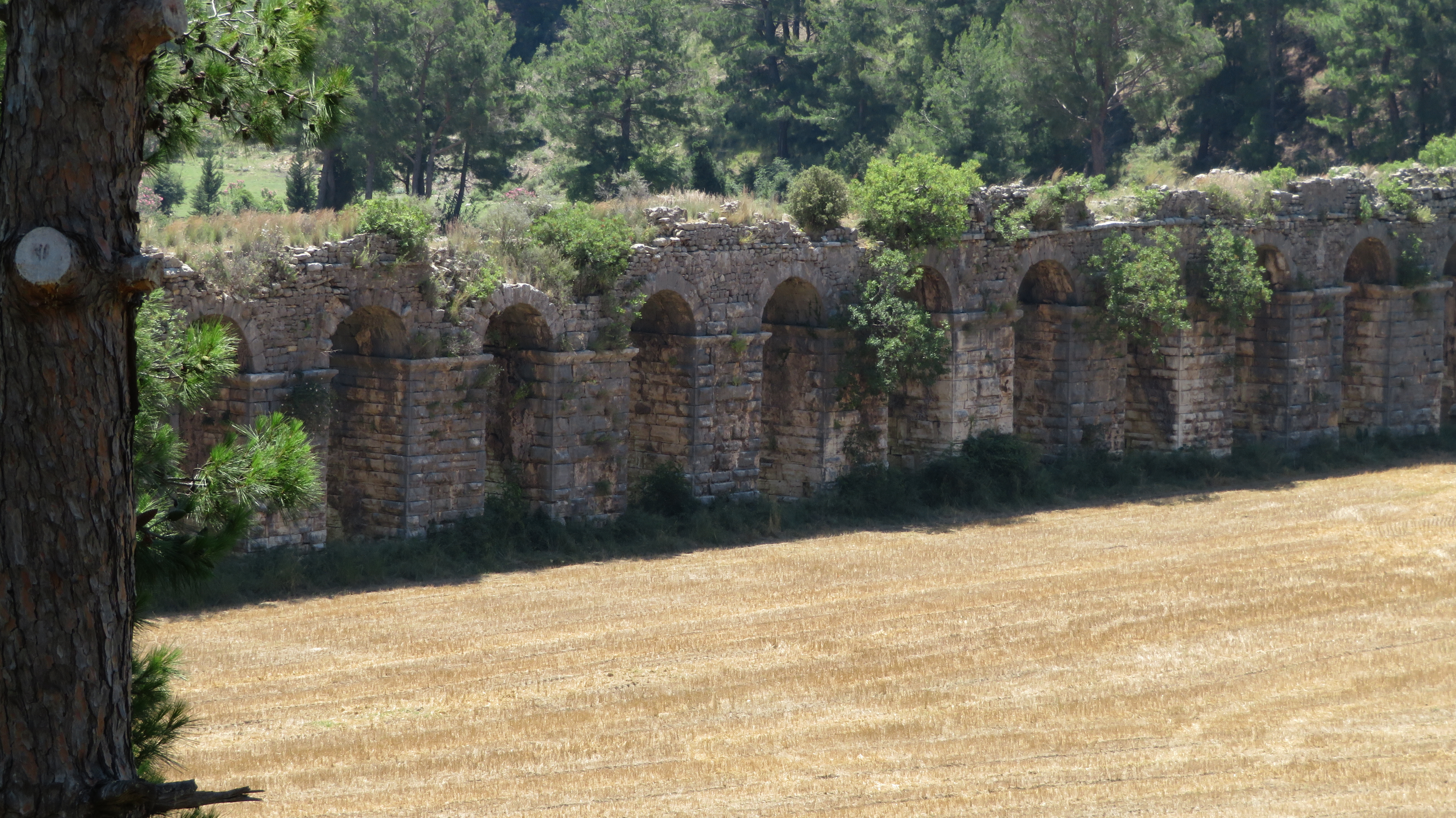
Aqueduct bridge near Oymapinar

The Roman aqueduct dates from 2nd half of the 2nd century AD and is 30 km in length. The aqueduct is special because it has an exceptional number of bridges which are still preserved as well as tunnels. This was because the altitude difference between source and city is only 36 m, so to make the gradient as high as possible it was necessary to keep the route as straight and short as possible through the hilly terrain, which entailed more expensive bridges (22 in total) and 16 tunnels 100-2260m long.

It was restored in the first half of the 3rd century, financed by Lollianos Bryonianos from Side according to an inscription.

== Today ==
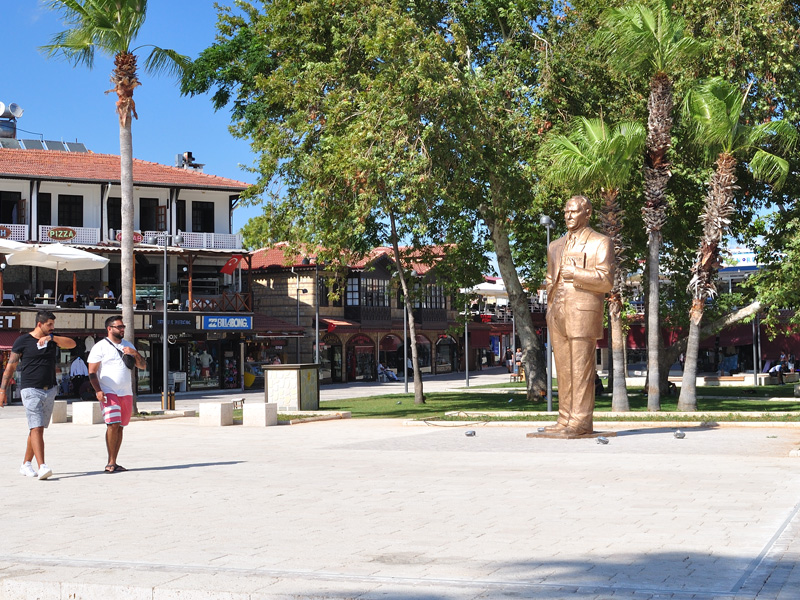
The central square of Side with the statue of Atatürk

In 1895, Turkish Muslim Immigrants from Crete moved to the area of the ruins and called it Selimiye; they also built houses over the ruins when the Cretan Turks moved there. Today, Side has become a popular holiday destination as a result of the expansion of the Antalya coastal project and is experiencing a revival.

It was a popular spot for watching the solar eclipse of March 29, 2006.

The bustling street called Liman Caddesi connects the town bus station with the square on the seafront, where the statue of Atatürk is situated.

== Notable people ==
- Marcellus of Side, an ancient physician
- Troilus (philosopher), a sophist
- Tribonian, a famous Byzantine jurist and advisor
- Callistus of Side, Olympic winner at Stadion race
- Eustolus of Side, Olympic winner at Stadion race
- Ruzi Nazar, Uzbek CIA officer active in Turkey during the 1960s; retired and died in Side

== See also ==
- Coinage of Side
- Manavgat Waterfall
- Oymapinar Dam
- Philip of Side
- Saint Probus of Side
- Sidetic language
