= Solar eclipse of January 1, 1889 =

Total eclipse

- Total eclipse
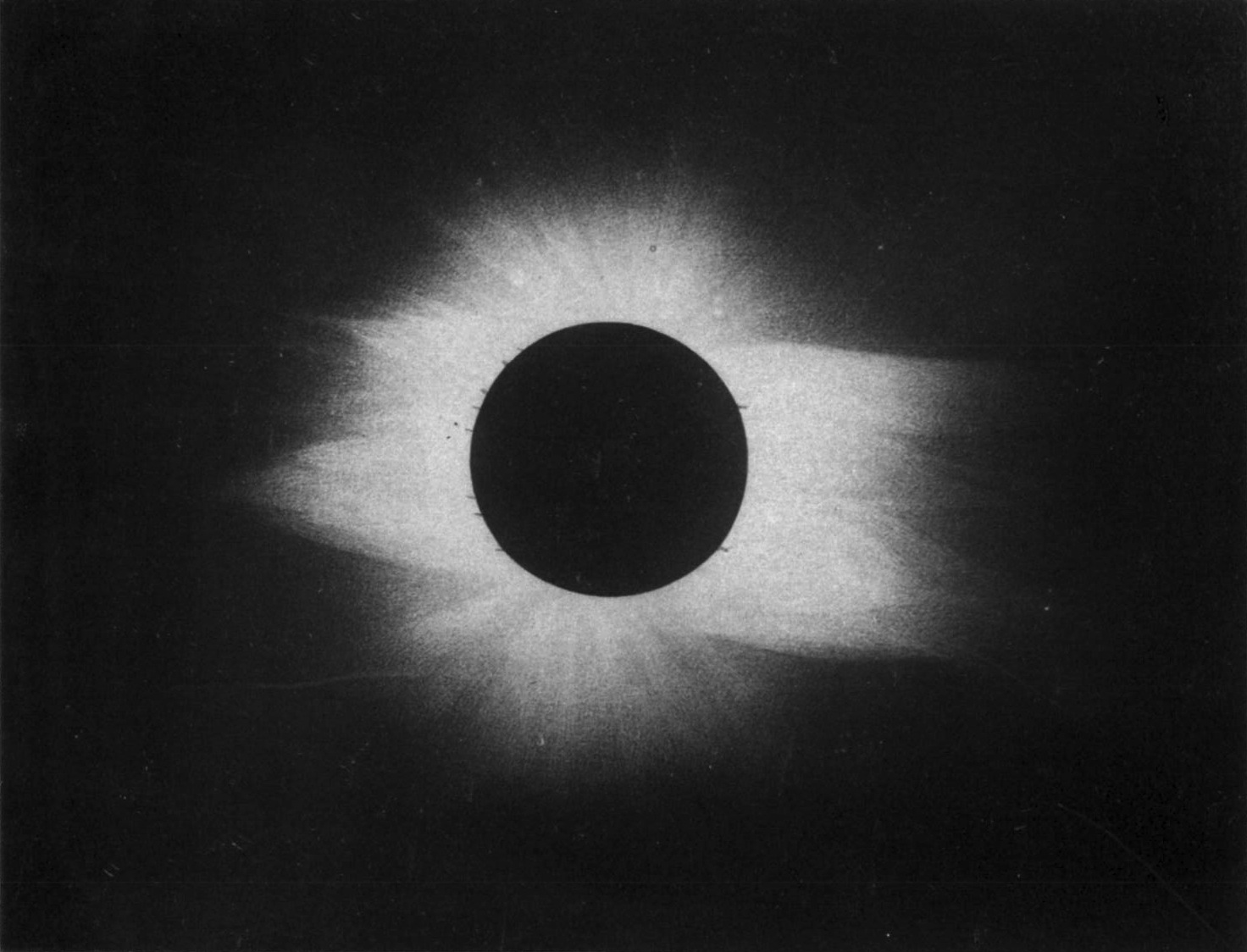
- Photograph taken from Norman, California

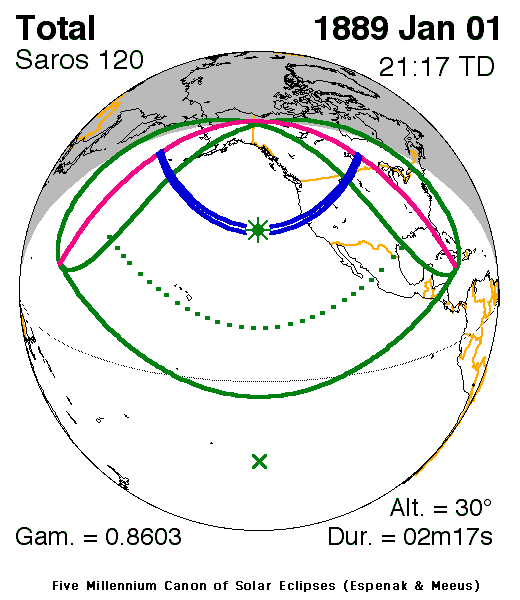
- Map
- Gamma: 0.8603
- Magnitude: 1.0262

Maximum eclipse
- Duration: 137 s (2 min 17 s)
- Coordinates: 36.7°N 137.6°W
- Max. width of band: 175 km (109 mi)

Times (UTC)
- Greatest eclipse: 21:16:50

References
- Saros: 120 (54 of 71)
- Catalog # (SE5000): 9255

A total solar eclipse occurred at the Moon's descending node of orbit on Tuesday, January 1, 1889, with a magnitude of 1.0262. A solar eclipse occurs when the Moon passes between Earth and the Sun, thereby totally or partly obscuring the image of the Sun for a viewer on Earth.

A total solar eclipse occurs when the Moon's apparent diameter is larger than the Sun's, blocking all direct sunlight, turning day into darkness. Totality occurs in a narrow path across Earth's surface, with the partial solar eclipse visible over a surrounding region thousands of kilometres wide. Occurring about 1.25 days after perigee (on December 31, 1888, at 15:10 UTC), the Moon's apparent diameter was larger.

The path of totality was visible from parts of the modern-day Aleutian Islands of Alaska, California, Nevada, extreme southeastern Oregon, Idaho, Wyoming, Montana, and North Dakota in the United States and south-central Canada. A partial solar eclipse was also visible for much of North America, Hawaii, and the western Caribbean.

== Observations and predictions ==
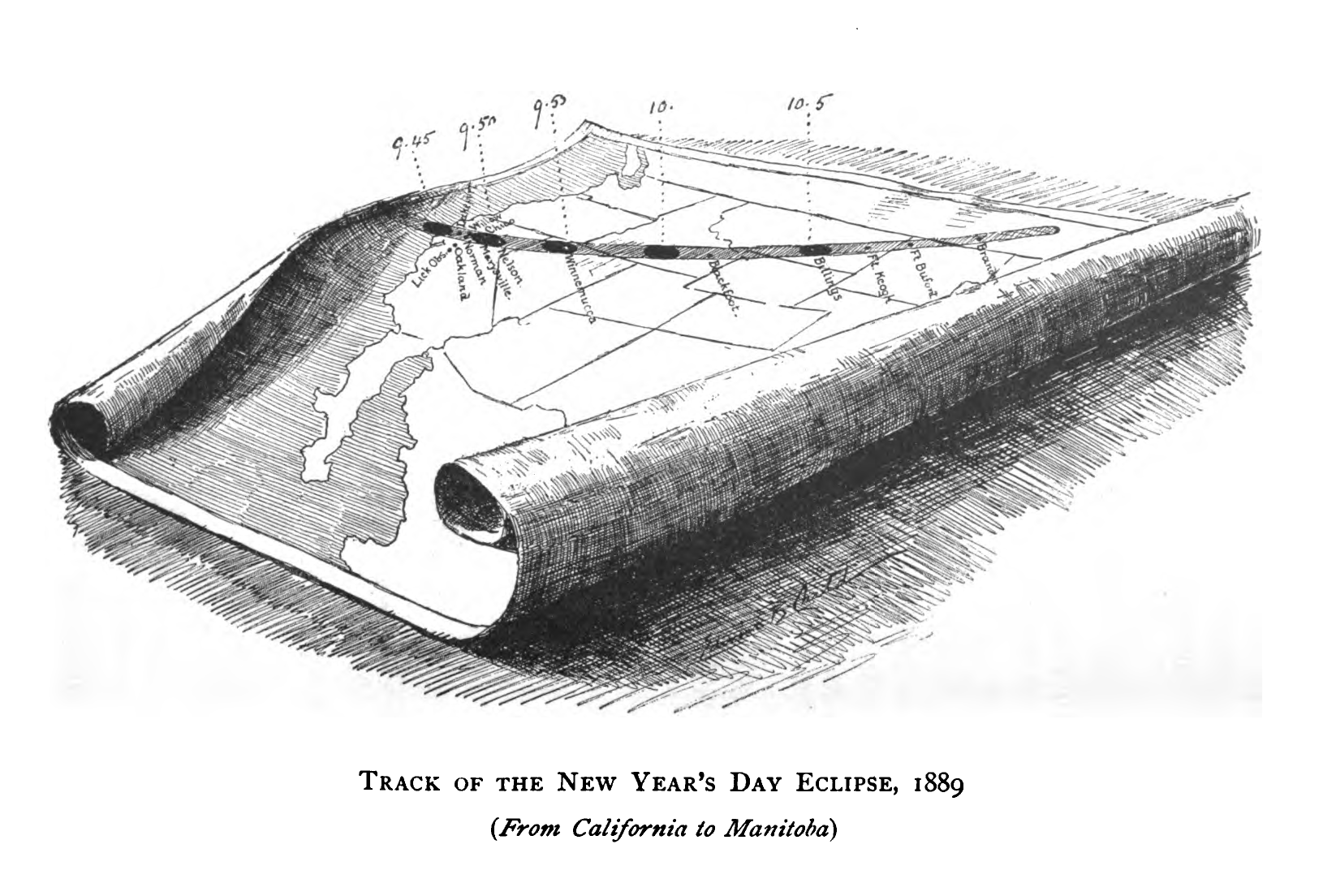
Path across the western United States and central Canada

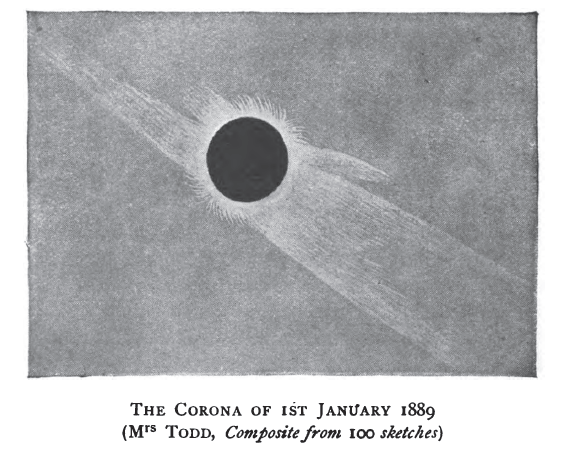
Drawing by Mabel Loomis Todd

== Impact ==
Wovoka the Paiute prophet received visions during the solar eclipse of January 1889. These visions were framework for the Pan-Indian religious movement known as the Ghost Dance.

== Eclipse details ==
Shown below are two tables displaying details about this particular solar eclipse. The first table outlines times at which the Moon's penumbra or umbra attains the specific parameter, and the second table describes various other parameters pertaining to this eclipse.

January 1, 1889 Solar Eclipse Times
Event	Time (UTC)
First Penumbral External Contact	1889 January 1 at 19:03:37.4 UTC
First Umbral External Contact	1889 January 1 at 20:23:10.8 UTC
First Central Line	1889 January 1 at 20:24:07.8 UTC
First Umbral Internal Contact	1889 January 1 at 20:25:05.6 UTC
Ecliptic Conjunction	1889 January 1 at 21:08:05.1 UTC
Equatorial Conjunction	1889 January 1 at 21:16:00.1 UTC
Greatest Duration	1889 January 1 at 21:16:12.2 UTC
Greatest Eclipse	1889 January 1 at 21:16:50.0 UTC
Last Umbral Internal Contact	1889 January 1 at 22:08:36.5 UTC
Last Central Line	1889 January 1 at 22:09:32.7 UTC
Last Umbral External Contact	1889 January 1 at 22:10:28.3 UTC
Last Penumbral External Contact	1889 January 1 at 23:30:05.9 UTC

January 1, 1889 Solar Eclipse Parameters
Parameter	Value
Eclipse Magnitude	1.02616
Eclipse Obscuration	1.05301
Gamma	0.86031
Sun Right Ascension	18h51m01.4s
Sun Declination	-22°56'03.4"
Sun Semi-Diameter	16'16.0"
Sun Equatorial Horizontal Parallax	08.9"
Moon Right Ascension	18h51m03.5s
Moon Declination	-22°03'55.3"
Moon Semi-Diameter	16'33.2"
Moon Equatorial Horizontal Parallax	1°00'45.2"
ΔT	-6.1 s

== Eclipse season ==
This eclipse is part of an eclipse season, a period, roughly every six months, when eclipses occur. Only two (or occasionally three) eclipse seasons occur each year, and each season lasts about 35 days and repeats just short of six months (173 days) later; thus two full eclipse seasons always occur each year. Either two or three eclipses happen each eclipse season. In the sequence below, each eclipse is separated by a fortnight.

Eclipse season of January 1889
January 1 Descending node (new moon)	January 17 Ascending node (full moon)
Total solar eclipse Solar Saros 120	Partial lunar eclipse Lunar Saros 132

== Related eclipses ==
=== Eclipses in 1889 ===
- A total solar eclipse on January 1.
- A partial lunar eclipse on January 17.
- An annular solar eclipse on June 28.
- A partial lunar eclipse on July 12.
- A total solar eclipse on December 22.

=== Metonic ===
- Preceded by: Solar eclipse of March 16, 1885
- Followed by: Solar eclipse of October 20, 1892

=== Tzolkinex ===
- Preceded by: Solar eclipse of November 21, 1881
- Followed by: Solar eclipse of February 13, 1896

=== Half-Saros ===
- Preceded by: Lunar eclipse of December 28, 1879
- Followed by: Lunar eclipse of January 8, 1898

=== Tritos ===
- Preceded by: Solar eclipse of February 2, 1878
- Followed by: Solar eclipse of December 3, 1899

=== Solar Saros 120 ===
- Preceded by: Solar eclipse of December 22, 1870
- Followed by: Solar eclipse of January 14, 1907

=== Inex ===
- Preceded by: Solar eclipse of January 23, 1860
- Followed by: Solar eclipse of December 14, 1917

=== Triad ===
- Preceded by: Solar eclipse of March 4, 1802
- Followed by: Solar eclipse of November 3, 1975

=== Solar eclipses of 1888–1891 ===
This eclipse is a member of a semester series. An eclipse in a semester series of solar eclipses repeats approximately every 177 days and 4 hours (a semester) at alternating nodes of the Moon's orbit.

The partial solar eclipses on February 11, 1888 and August 7, 1888 occur in the previous lunar year eclipse set.

Solar eclipse series sets from 1888 to 1891
Ascending node			Descending node		
Saros	Map	Gamma	Saros	Map	Gamma
115	July 9, 1888 Partial	−1.2797	120	January 1, 1889 Total	0.8603
125	June 28, 1889 Annular	−0.5431	130	December 22, 1889 Total	0.1888
135	June 17, 1890 Annular	0.2246	140	December 12, 1890 Hybrid	−0.5016
145	June 6, 1891 Annular	0.9754	150	December 1, 1891 Partial	−1.2515

=== Saros 120 ===
This eclipse is a part of Saros series 120, repeating every 18 years, 11 days, and containing 71 events. The series started with a partial solar eclipse on May 27, 933 AD. It contains annular eclipses from August 11, 1059 through April 26, 1492; hybrid eclipses from May 8, 1510 through June 8, 1564; and total eclipses from June 20, 1582 through March 30, 2033. The series ends at member 71 as a partial eclipse on July 7, 2195. Its eclipses are tabulated in three columns; every third eclipse in the same column is one exeligmos apart, so they all cast shadows over approximately the same parts of the Earth.

The longest duration of annularity was produced by member 11 at 6 minutes, 24 seconds on September 11, 1113, and the longest duration of totality was produced by member 60 at 2 minutes, 50 seconds on March 9, 1997. All eclipses in this series occur at the Moon’s descending node of orbit.

Series members 50–71 occur between 1801 and 2195:
50	51	52
November 19, 1816	November 30, 1834	December 11, 1852
53	54	55
December 22, 1870	January 1, 1889	January 14, 1907
56	57	58
January 24, 1925	February 4, 1943	February 15, 1961
59	60	61
February 26, 1979	March 9, 1997	March 20, 2015
62	63	64
March 30, 2033	April 11, 2051	April 21, 2069
65	66	67
May 2, 2087	May 14, 2105	May 25, 2123
68	69	70
June 4, 2141	June 16, 2159	June 26, 2177
71
July 7, 2195

=== Metonic series ===
The metonic series repeats eclipses every 19 years (6939.69 days), lasting about 5 cycles. Eclipses occur in nearly the same calendar date. In addition, the octon subseries repeats 1/5 of that or every 3.8 years (1387.94 days). All eclipses in this table occur at the Moon's descending node.

22 eclipse events between March 16, 1866 and August 9, 1953
March 16–17	January 1–3	October 20–22	August 9–10	May 27–29
108	110	112	114	116
March 16, 1866			August 9, 1877	May 27, 1881
118	120	122	124	126
March 16, 1885	January 1, 1889	October 20, 1892	August 9, 1896	May 28, 1900
128	130	132	134	136
March 17, 1904	January 3, 1908	October 22, 1911	August 10, 1915	May 29, 1919
138	140	142	144	146
March 17, 1923	January 3, 1927	October 21, 1930	August 10, 1934	May 29, 1938
148	150	152	154	
March 16, 1942	January 3, 1946	October 21, 1949	August 9, 1953	

=== Tritos series ===
This eclipse is a part of a tritos cycle, repeating at alternating nodes every 135 synodic months (≈ 3986.63 days, or 11 years minus 1 month). Their appearance and longitude are irregular due to a lack of synchronization with the anomalistic month (period of perigee), but groupings of 3 tritos cycles (≈ 33 years minus 3 months) come close (≈ 434.044 anomalistic months), so eclipses are similar in these groupings.

Series members between 1801 and 2200
September 8, 1801 (Saros 112)	August 7, 1812 (Saros 113)	July 8, 1823 (Saros 114)	June 7, 1834 (Saros 115)	May 6, 1845 (Saros 116)
April 5, 1856 (Saros 117)	March 6, 1867 (Saros 118)	February 2, 1878 (Saros 119)	January 1, 1889 (Saros 120)	December 3, 1899 (Saros 121)
November 2, 1910 (Saros 122)	October 1, 1921 (Saros 123)	August 31, 1932 (Saros 124)	August 1, 1943 (Saros 125)	June 30, 1954 (Saros 126)
May 30, 1965 (Saros 127)	April 29, 1976 (Saros 128)	March 29, 1987 (Saros 129)	February 26, 1998 (Saros 130)	January 26, 2009 (Saros 131)
December 26, 2019 (Saros 132)	November 25, 2030 (Saros 133)	October 25, 2041 (Saros 134)	September 22, 2052 (Saros 135)	August 24, 2063 (Saros 136)
July 24, 2074 (Saros 137)	June 22, 2085 (Saros 138)	May 22, 2096 (Saros 139)	April 23, 2107 (Saros 140)	March 22, 2118 (Saros 141)
February 18, 2129 (Saros 142)	January 20, 2140 (Saros 143)	December 19, 2150 (Saros 144)	November 17, 2161 (Saros 145)	October 17, 2172 (Saros 146)
September 16, 2183 (Saros 147)	August 16, 2194 (Saros 148)			

=== Inex series ===
This eclipse is a part of the long period inex cycle, repeating at alternating nodes, every 358 synodic months (≈ 10,571.95 days, or 29 years minus 20 days). Their appearance and longitude are irregular due to a lack of synchronization with the anomalistic month (period of perigee). However, groupings of 3 inex cycles (≈ 87 years minus 2 months) comes close (≈ 1,151.02 anomalistic months), so eclipses are similar in these groupings.

Series members between 1801 and 2200
March 4, 1802 (Saros 117)	February 12, 1831 (Saros 118)	January 23, 1860 (Saros 119)
January 1, 1889 (Saros 120)	December 14, 1917 (Saros 121)	November 23, 1946 (Saros 122)
November 3, 1975 (Saros 123)	October 14, 2004 (Saros 124)	September 23, 2033 (Saros 125)
September 3, 2062 (Saros 126)	August 15, 2091 (Saros 127)	July 25, 2120 (Saros 128)
July 5, 2149 (Saros 129)	June 16, 2178 (Saros 130)	
