= Solar eclipse of October 27, 1780 =

Total eclipse

- Total eclipse
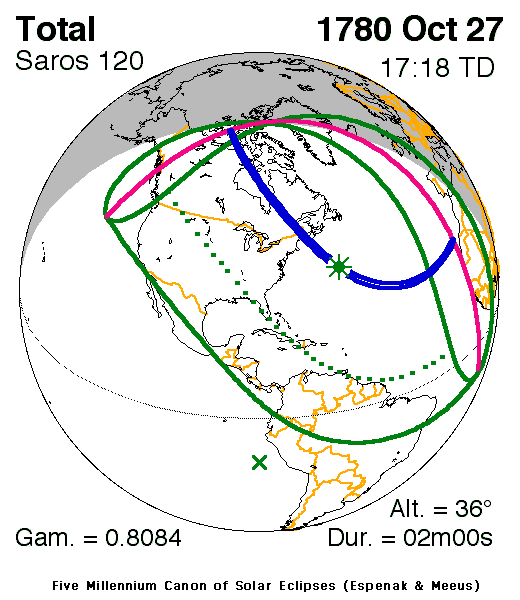
- Map
- Gamma: 0.8083
- Magnitude: 1.0244

Maximum eclipse
- Duration: 120 s (2 min 0 s)
- Coordinates: 35.6°N 58.6°W
- Max. width of band: 138 km (86 mi)

Times (UTC)
- Greatest eclipse: 17:18:27

References
- Saros: 120 (48 of 71)
- Catalog # (SE5000): 8991

A total solar eclipse occurred on October 27, 1780. A solar eclipse occurs when the Moon passes between Earth and the Sun, thereby totally or partly obscuring the image of the Sun for a viewer on Earth. A total solar eclipse occurs when the Moon's apparent diameter is larger than the Sun's, blocking all direct sunlight, turning day into darkness. Totality occurs in a narrow path across Earth's surface, with the partial solar eclipse visible over a surrounding region thousands of kilometres wide.

== Observations ==
Modern analysis indicates Samuel Williams miscalculated the path of totality for an expedition.

== Related eclipses ==
It is a part of solar Saros 120.

== See also ==
- List of solar eclipses visible from the United Kingdom 1000–2090 AD
