= Solar eclipse of November 23, 1946 =

20th-century partial solar eclipse

- Partial eclipse
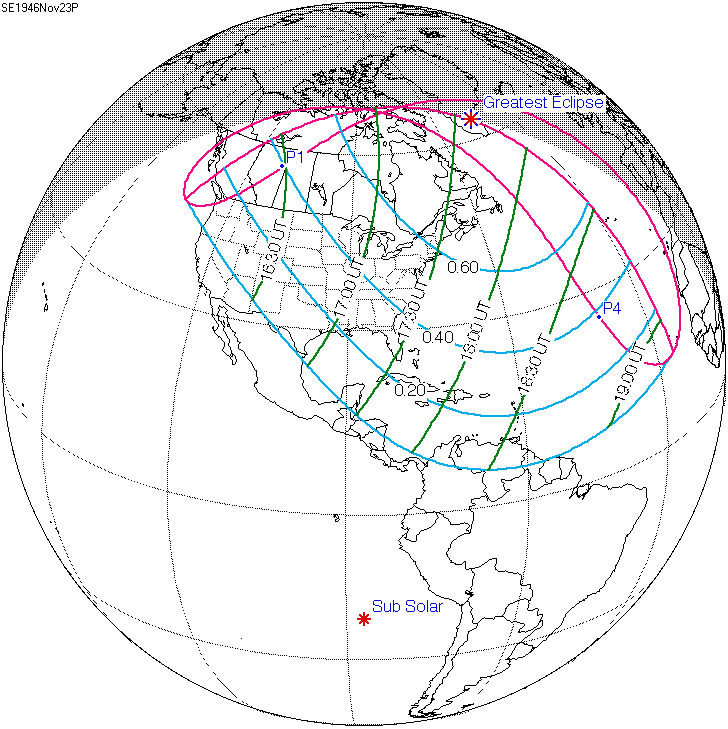
- Map
- Gamma: 1.105
- Magnitude: 0.7758

Maximum eclipse
- Coordinates: 63.4°N 45.3°W

Times (UTC)
- Greatest eclipse: 17:37:12

References
- Saros: 122 (54 of 70)
- Catalog # (SE5000): 9391

A partial solar eclipse occurred at the Moon's descending node of orbit on Saturday, November 23, 1946, with a magnitude of 0.7758. A solar eclipse occurs when the Moon passes between Earth and the Sun, thereby totally or partly obscuring the image of the Sun for a viewer on Earth. A partial solar eclipse occurs in the polar regions of the Earth when the center of the Moon's shadow misses the Earth.

This was the last of four partial solar eclipses in 1946, with the others occurring on January 3, May 30, and June 29.

A partial eclipse was visible for parts of Canada, the United States, the Caribbean, and northern South America.

== Eclipse details ==
Shown below are two tables displaying details about this particular solar eclipse. The first table outlines times at which the Moon's penumbra or umbra attains the specific parameter, and the second table describes various other parameters pertaining to this eclipse.

November 23, 1946 Solar Eclipse Times
Event	Time (UTC)
First Penumbral External Contact	1946 November 23 at 15:24:47.5 UTC
Equatorial Conjunction	1946 November 23 at 16:55:38.1 UTC
Ecliptic Conjunction	1946 November 23 at 17:24:13.7 UTC
Greatest Eclipse	1946 November 23 at 17:37:12.3 UTC
Last Penumbral External Contact	1946 November 23 at 19:49:56.7 UTC

November 23, 1946 Solar Eclipse Parameters
Parameter	Value
Eclipse Magnitude	0.77586
Eclipse Obscuration	0.69076
Gamma	1.10500
Sun Right Ascension	15h54m45.3s
Sun Declination	-20°19'54.3"
Sun Semi-Diameter	16'12.0"
Sun Equatorial Horizontal Parallax	08.9"
Moon Right Ascension	15h56m01.8s
Moon Declination	-19°22'58.6"
Moon Semi-Diameter	14'45.7"
Moon Equatorial Horizontal Parallax	0°54'10.6"
ΔT	27.7 s

== Eclipse season ==
This eclipse is part of an eclipse season, a period, roughly every six months, when eclipses occur. Only two (or occasionally three) eclipse seasons occur each year, and each season lasts about 35 days and repeats just short of six months (173 days) later; thus two full eclipse seasons always occur each year. Either two or three eclipses happen each eclipse season. In the sequence below, each eclipse is separated by a fortnight.

Eclipse season of November–December 1946
November 23 Descending node (new moon)	December 8 Ascending node (full moon)
Partial solar eclipse Solar Saros 122	Total lunar eclipse Lunar Saros 134

== Related eclipses ==
=== Eclipses in 1946 ===
- A partial solar eclipse on January 3.
- A partial solar eclipse on May 30.
- A total lunar eclipse on June 14.
- A partial solar eclipse on June 29.
- A partial solar eclipse on November 23.
- A total lunar eclipse on December 8.

=== Metonic ===
- Preceded by: Solar eclipse of February 4, 1943
- Followed by: Solar eclipse of September 12, 1950

=== Tzolkinex ===
- Preceded by: Solar eclipse of October 12, 1939
- Followed by: Solar eclipse of January 5, 1954

=== Half-Saros ===
- Preceded by: Lunar eclipse of November 18, 1937
- Followed by: Lunar eclipse of November 29, 1955

=== Tritos ===
- Preceded by: Solar eclipse of December 25, 1935
- Followed by: Solar eclipse of October 23, 1957

=== Solar Saros 122 ===
- Preceded by: Solar eclipse of November 12, 1928
- Followed by: Solar eclipse of December 4, 1964

=== Inex ===
- Preceded by: Solar eclipse of December 14, 1917
- Followed by: Solar eclipse of November 3, 1975

=== Triad ===
- Preceded by: Solar eclipse of January 23, 1860
- Followed by: Solar eclipse of September 23, 2033

=== Solar eclipses of 1946–1949 ===
This eclipse is a member of a semester series. An eclipse in a semester series of solar eclipses repeats approximately every 177 days and 4 hours (a semester) at alternating nodes of the Moon's orbit.

The partial solar eclipses on January 3, 1946 and June 29, 1946 occur in the previous lunar year eclipse set.

Solar eclipse series sets from 1946 to 1949
Ascending node			Descending node		
Saros	Map	Gamma	Saros	Map	Gamma
117	May 30, 1946 Partial	−1.0711	122	November 23, 1946 Partial	1.105
127	May 20, 1947 Total	−0.3528	132	November 12, 1947 Annular	0.3743
137	May 9, 1948 Annular	0.4133	142	November 1, 1948 Total	−0.3517
147	April 28, 1949 Partial	1.2068	152	October 21, 1949 Partial	−1.027

=== Saros 122 ===
This eclipse is a part of Saros series 122, repeating every 18 years, 11 days, and containing 70 events. The series started with a partial solar eclipse on April 17, 991 AD. It contains total eclipses from July 12, 1135 through August 3, 1171; hybrid eclipses on August 13, 1189 and August 25, 1207; and annular eclipses from September 4, 1225 through October 10, 1874. The series ends at member 70 as a partial eclipse on May 17, 2235. Its eclipses are tabulated in three columns; every third eclipse in the same column is one exeligmos apart, so they all cast shadows over approximately the same parts of the Earth.

The longest duration of totality was produced by member 9 at 1 minutes, 25 seconds on July 12, 1135, and the longest duration of annularity was produced by member 50 at 6 minutes, 28 seconds on October 10, 1874. All eclipses in this series occur at the Moon’s descending node of orbit.

Series members 46–68 occur between 1801 and 2200:
46	47	48
August 28, 1802	September 7, 1820	September 18, 1838
49	50	51
September 29, 1856	October 10, 1874	October 20, 1892
52	53	54
November 2, 1910	November 12, 1928	November 23, 1946
55	56	57
December 4, 1964	December 15, 1982	December 25, 2000
58	59	60
January 6, 2019	January 16, 2037	January 27, 2055
61	62	63
February 7, 2073	February 18, 2091	March 1, 2109
64	65	66
March 13, 2127	March 23, 2145	April 3, 2163
67	68	
April 14, 2181	April 25, 2199	

=== Metonic series ===
The metonic series repeats eclipses every 19 years (6939.69 days), lasting about 5 cycles. Eclipses occur in nearly the same calendar date. In addition, the octon subseries repeats 1/5 of that or every 3.8 years (1387.94 days). All eclipses in this table occur at the Moon's descending node.

22 eclipse events between September 12, 1931 and July 1, 2011
September 11–12	June 30–July 1	April 17–19	February 4–5	November 22–23
114	116	118	120	122
September 12, 1931	June 30, 1935	April 19, 1939	February 4, 1943	November 23, 1946
124	126	128	130	132
September 12, 1950	June 30, 1954	April 19, 1958	February 5, 1962	November 23, 1965
134	136	138	140	142
September 11, 1969	June 30, 1973	April 18, 1977	February 4, 1981	November 22, 1984
144	146	148	150	152
September 11, 1988	June 30, 1992	April 17, 1996	February 5, 2000	November 23, 2003
154	156			
September 11, 2007	July 1, 2011			

=== Tritos series ===
This eclipse is a part of a tritos cycle, repeating at alternating nodes every 135 synodic months (≈ 3986.63 days, or 11 years minus 1 month). Their appearance and longitude are irregular due to a lack of synchronization with the anomalistic month (period of perigee), but groupings of 3 tritos cycles (≈ 33 years minus 3 months) come close (≈ 434.044 anomalistic months), so eclipses are similar in these groupings.

Series members between 1801 and 2200
January 1, 1805 (Saros 109)		October 31, 1826 (Saros 111)		August 28, 1848 (Saros 113)
July 29, 1859 (Saros 114)	June 28, 1870 (Saros 115)	May 27, 1881 (Saros 116)	April 26, 1892 (Saros 117)	March 29, 1903 (Saros 118)
February 25, 1914 (Saros 119)	January 24, 1925 (Saros 120)	December 25, 1935 (Saros 121)	November 23, 1946 (Saros 122)	October 23, 1957 (Saros 123)
September 22, 1968 (Saros 124)	August 22, 1979 (Saros 125)	July 22, 1990 (Saros 126)	June 21, 2001 (Saros 127)	May 20, 2012 (Saros 128)
April 20, 2023 (Saros 129)	March 20, 2034 (Saros 130)	February 16, 2045 (Saros 131)	January 16, 2056 (Saros 132)	December 17, 2066 (Saros 133)
November 15, 2077 (Saros 134)	October 14, 2088 (Saros 135)	September 14, 2099 (Saros 136)	August 15, 2110 (Saros 137)	July 14, 2121 (Saros 138)
June 13, 2132 (Saros 139)	May 14, 2143 (Saros 140)	April 12, 2154 (Saros 141)	March 12, 2165 (Saros 142)	February 10, 2176 (Saros 143)
January 9, 2187 (Saros 144)	December 9, 2197 (Saros 145)			

=== Inex series ===
This eclipse is a part of the long period inex cycle, repeating at alternating nodes, every 358 synodic months (≈ 10,571.95 days, or 29 years minus 20 days). Their appearance and longitude are irregular due to a lack of synchronization with the anomalistic month (period of perigee). However, groupings of 3 inex cycles (≈ 87 years minus 2 months) comes close (≈ 1,151.02 anomalistic months), so eclipses are similar in these groupings.

Series members between 1801 and 2200
March 4, 1802 (Saros 117)	February 12, 1831 (Saros 118)	January 23, 1860 (Saros 119)
January 1, 1889 (Saros 120)	December 14, 1917 (Saros 121)	November 23, 1946 (Saros 122)
November 3, 1975 (Saros 123)	October 14, 2004 (Saros 124)	September 23, 2033 (Saros 125)
September 3, 2062 (Saros 126)	August 15, 2091 (Saros 127)	July 25, 2120 (Saros 128)
July 5, 2149 (Saros 129)	June 16, 2178 (Saros 130)	
