= Solar eclipse of December 22, 1870 =

Total eclipse

- Total eclipse
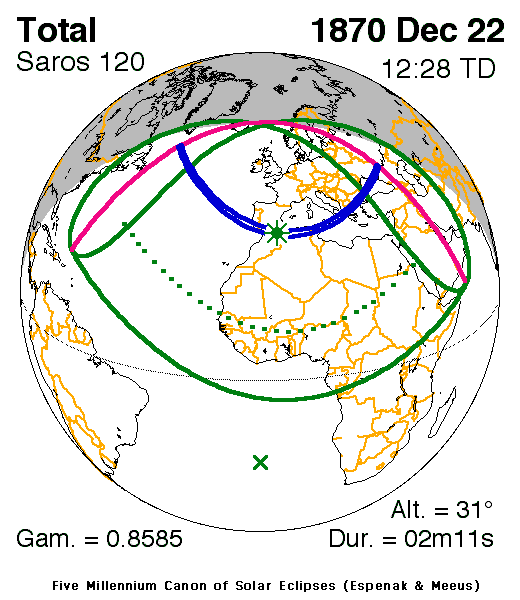
- Map
- Gamma: 0.8585
- Magnitude: 1.0248

Maximum eclipse
- Duration: 131 s (2 min 11 s)
- Coordinates: 35.7°N 1.5°W
- Max. width of band: 165 km (103 mi)

Times (UTC)
- Greatest eclipse: 12:27:33

References
- Saros: 120 (53 of 71)
- Catalog # (SE5000): 9213

A total solar eclipse occurred at the Moon's descending node of orbit on Thursday, December 22, 1870, with a magnitude of 1.0248. A solar eclipse occurs when the Moon passes between Earth and the Sun, thereby totally or partly obscuring the image of the Sun for a viewer on Earth. A total solar eclipse occurs when the Moon's apparent diameter is larger than the Sun's, blocking all direct sunlight, turning day into darkness. Totality occurs in a narrow path across Earth's surface, with the partial solar eclipse visible over a surrounding region thousands of kilometres wide. Occurring about 1.4 days before perigee (on December 21, 1870, at 3:50 UTC), the Moon's apparent diameter was larger.

The path of totality was visible from parts of modern-day southern Portugal, southern Spain, northern Morocco, northern Algeria, Tunisia, Italy, Greece, northwestern Turkey, southeastern Bulgaria, southeastern Ukraine, and western Russia. A partial solar eclipse was also visible for parts of eastern Canada, Europe, North Africa, West Africa, and the Middle East.

== Observations ==
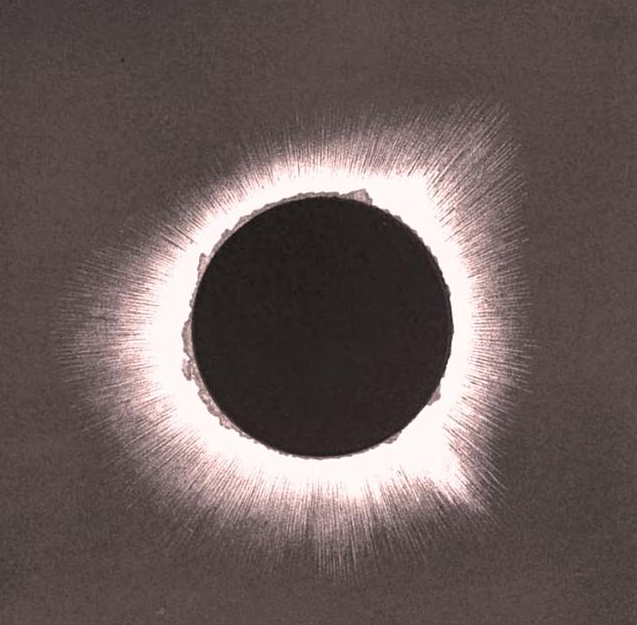
From Syracuse by Captain G. L. Tupman, R.M.A.

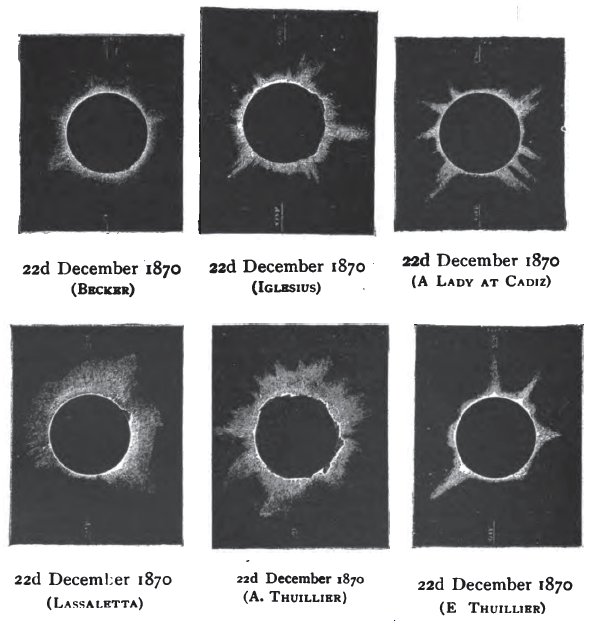

== Eclipse details ==
Shown below are two tables displaying details about this particular solar eclipse. The first table outlines times at which the Moon's penumbra or umbra attains the specific parameter, and the second table describes various other parameters pertaining to this eclipse.

December 22, 1870 Solar Eclipse Times
Event	Time (UTC)
First Penumbral External Contact	1870 December 22 at 10:13:56.6 UTC
First Umbral External Contact	1870 December 22 at 11:33:35.2 UTC
First Central Line	1870 December 22 at 11:34:27.4 UTC
First Umbral Internal Contact	1870 December 22 at 11:35:20.3 UTC
Ecliptic Conjunction	1870 December 22 at 12:18:47.9 UTC
Equatorial Conjunction	1870 December 22 at 12:19:09.0 UTC
Greatest Duration	1870 December 22 at 12:27:10.9 UTC
Greatest Eclipse	1870 December 22 at 12:27:32.6 UTC
Last Umbral Internal Contact	1870 December 22 at 13:19:52.2 UTC
Last Central Line	1870 December 22 at 13:20:43.5 UTC
Last Umbral External Contact	1870 December 22 at 13:21:34.1 UTC
Last Penumbral External Contact	1870 December 22 at 14:41:15.4 UTC

December 22, 1870 Solar Eclipse Parameters
Parameter	Value
Eclipse Magnitude	1.02476
Eclipse Obscuration	1.05013
Gamma	0.85849
Sun Right Ascension	18h02m16.0s
Sun Declination	-23°27'15.7"
Sun Semi-Diameter	16'15.7"
Sun Equatorial Horizontal Parallax	08.9"
Moon Right Ascension	18h02m37.0s
Moon Declination	-22°35'32.9"
Moon Semi-Diameter	16'31.5"
Moon Equatorial Horizontal Parallax	1°00'38.9"
ΔT	-0.1 s

== Eclipse season ==
This eclipse is part of an eclipse season, a period, roughly every six months, when eclipses occur. Only two (or occasionally three) eclipse seasons occur each year, and each season lasts about 35 days and repeats just short of six months (173 days) later; thus two full eclipse seasons always occur each year. Either two or three eclipses happen each eclipse season. In the sequence below, each eclipse is separated by a fortnight.

Eclipse season of December 1870–January 1871
December 22 Descending node (new moon)	January 6 Ascending node (full moon)
Total solar eclipse Solar Saros 120	Partial lunar eclipse Lunar Saros 132

== Related eclipses ==
=== Eclipses in 1870 ===
- A total lunar eclipse on January 17.
- A partial solar eclipse on January 31.
- A partial solar eclipse on June 28.
- A total lunar eclipse on July 12.
- A partial solar eclipse on July 28.
- A total solar eclipse on December 22.

=== Metonic ===
- Preceded by: Solar eclipse of March 6, 1867
- Followed by: Solar eclipse of October 10, 1874

=== Tzolkinex ===
- Preceded by: Solar eclipse of November 11, 1863
- Followed by: Solar eclipse of February 2, 1878

=== Half-Saros ===
- Preceded by: Lunar eclipse of December 17, 1861
- Followed by: Lunar eclipse of December 28, 1879

=== Tritos ===
- Preceded by: Solar eclipse of January 23, 1860
- Followed by: Solar eclipse of November 21, 1881

=== Solar Saros 120 ===
- Preceded by: Solar eclipse of December 11, 1852
- Followed by: Solar eclipse of January 1, 1889

=== Inex ===
- Preceded by: Solar eclipse of January 11, 1842
- Followed by: Solar eclipse of December 3, 1899

=== Triad ===
- Preceded by: Solar eclipse of February 20, 1784
- Followed by: Solar eclipse of October 23, 1957

=== Solar eclipses of 1870–1873 ===
This eclipse is a member of a semester series. An eclipse in a semester series of solar eclipses repeats approximately every 177 days and 4 hours (a semester) at alternating nodes of the Moon's orbit.

The partial solar eclipses on January 31, 1870 and July 28, 1870 occurs in the previous lunar year eclipse set.

Solar eclipse series sets from 1870 to 1873
Ascending node			Descending node		
Saros	Map	Gamma	Saros	Map	Gamma
115	June 28, 1870 Partial	−1.1949	120	December 22, 1870 Total	0.8585
125	June 18, 1871 Annular	−0.4550	130	December 12, 1871 Total	0.1836
135	June 6, 1872 Annular	0.3095	140	November 30, 1872 Hybrid	−0.5081
145	May 26, 1873 Partial	1.0513	150	November 20, 1873 Partial	−1.2625

=== Saros 120 ===
This eclipse is a part of Saros series 120, repeating every 18 years, 11 days, and containing 71 events. The series started with a partial solar eclipse on May 27, 933 AD. It contains annular eclipses from August 11, 1059 through April 26, 1492; hybrid eclipses from May 8, 1510 through June 8, 1564; and total eclipses from June 20, 1582 through March 30, 2033. The series ends at member 71 as a partial eclipse on July 7, 2195. Its eclipses are tabulated in three columns; every third eclipse in the same column is one exeligmos apart, so they all cast shadows over approximately the same parts of the Earth.

The longest duration of annularity was produced by member 11 at 6 minutes, 24 seconds on September 11, 1113, and the longest duration of totality was produced by member 60 at 2 minutes, 50 seconds on March 9, 1997. All eclipses in this series occur at the Moon’s descending node of orbit.

Series members 50–71 occur between 1801 and 2195:
50	51	52
November 19, 1816	November 30, 1834	December 11, 1852
53	54	55
December 22, 1870	January 1, 1889	January 14, 1907
56	57	58
January 24, 1925	February 4, 1943	February 15, 1961
59	60	61
February 26, 1979	March 9, 1997	March 20, 2015
62	63	64
March 30, 2033	April 11, 2051	April 21, 2069
65	66	67
May 2, 2087	May 14, 2105	May 25, 2123
68	69	70
June 4, 2141	June 16, 2159	June 26, 2177
71
July 7, 2195

=== Metonic series ===
The metonic series repeats eclipses every 19 years (6939.69 days), lasting about 5 cycles. Eclipses occur in nearly the same calendar date. In addition, the octon subseries repeats 1/5 of that or every 3.8 years (1387.94 days). All eclipses in this table occur at the Moon's descending node.

22 eclipse events between March 5, 1848 and July 30, 1935
March 5–6	December 22–24	October 9–11	July 29–30	May 17–18
108	110	112	114	116
March 5, 1848			July 29, 1859	May 17, 1863
118	120	122	124	126
March 6, 1867	December 22, 1870	October 10, 1874	July 29, 1878	May 17, 1882
128	130	132	134	136
March 5, 1886	December 22, 1889	October 9, 1893	July 29, 1897	May 18, 1901
138	140	142	144	146
March 6, 1905	December 23, 1908	October 10, 1912	July 30, 1916	May 18, 1920
148	150	152	154	
March 5, 1924	December 24, 1927	October 11, 1931	July 30, 1935	

=== Tritos series ===
This eclipse is a part of a tritos cycle, repeating at alternating nodes every 135 synodic months (≈ 3986.63 days, or 11 years minus 1 month). Their appearance and longitude are irregular due to a lack of synchronization with the anomalistic month (period of perigee), but groupings of 3 tritos cycles (≈ 33 years minus 3 months) come close (≈ 434.044 anomalistic months), so eclipses are similar in these groupings.

Series members between 1801 and 2200
June 26, 1805 (Saros 114)	May 27, 1816 (Saros 115)	April 26, 1827 (Saros 116)	March 25, 1838 (Saros 117)	February 23, 1849 (Saros 118)
January 23, 1860 (Saros 119)	December 22, 1870 (Saros 120)	November 21, 1881 (Saros 121)	October 20, 1892 (Saros 122)	September 21, 1903 (Saros 123)
August 21, 1914 (Saros 124)	July 20, 1925 (Saros 125)	June 19, 1936 (Saros 126)	May 20, 1947 (Saros 127)	April 19, 1958 (Saros 128)
March 18, 1969 (Saros 129)	February 16, 1980 (Saros 130)	January 15, 1991 (Saros 131)	December 14, 2001 (Saros 132)	November 13, 2012 (Saros 133)
October 14, 2023 (Saros 134)	September 12, 2034 (Saros 135)	August 12, 2045 (Saros 136)	July 12, 2056 (Saros 137)	June 11, 2067 (Saros 138)
May 11, 2078 (Saros 139)	April 10, 2089 (Saros 140)	March 10, 2100 (Saros 141)	February 8, 2111 (Saros 142)	January 8, 2122 (Saros 143)
December 7, 2132 (Saros 144)	November 7, 2143 (Saros 145)	October 7, 2154 (Saros 146)	September 5, 2165 (Saros 147)	August 4, 2176 (Saros 148)
July 6, 2187 (Saros 149)	June 4, 2198 (Saros 150)			

=== Inex series ===
This eclipse is a part of the long period inex cycle, repeating at alternating nodes, every 358 synodic months (≈ 10,571.95 days, or 29 years minus 20 days). Their appearance and longitude are irregular due to a lack of synchronization with the anomalistic month (period of perigee). However, groupings of 3 inex cycles (≈ 87 years minus 2 months) comes close (≈ 1,151.02 anomalistic months), so eclipses are similar in these groupings.

Series members between 1801 and 2200
February 1, 1813 (Saros 118)	January 11, 1842 (Saros 119)	December 22, 1870 (Saros 120)
December 3, 1899 (Saros 121)	November 12, 1928 (Saros 122)	October 23, 1957 (Saros 123)
October 3, 1986 (Saros 124)	September 13, 2015 (Saros 125)	August 23, 2044 (Saros 126)
August 3, 2073 (Saros 127)	July 15, 2102 (Saros 128)	June 25, 2131 (Saros 129)
June 4, 2160 (Saros 130)	May 15, 2189 (Saros 131)	
