= Solar eclipse of October 14, 2004 =

21st-century partial solar eclipse

- Partial eclipse
- Map
- Gamma: 1.0348
- Magnitude: 0.9282

Maximum eclipse
- Coordinates: 61.2°N 153.7°W

Times (UTC)
- Greatest eclipse: 3:00:23

References
- Saros: 124 (54 of 73)
- Catalog # (SE5000): 9518

A partial solar eclipse occurred at the Moon's descending node of orbit between Wednesday, October 13 and Thursday, October 14, 2004, with a magnitude of 0.9282. A solar eclipse occurs when the Moon passes between Earth and the Sun, thereby totally or partly obscuring the image of the Sun for a viewer on Earth. A partial solar eclipse occurs in the polar regions of the Earth when the center of the Moon's shadow misses the Earth.

A partial eclipse was visible for parts of eastern Russia, Mongolia, northeastern China, Korea, Japan, Hawaii, and western Alaska.

== Images ==
Animated path

== Eclipse timing ==
=== Places experiencing partial eclipse ===
Solar Eclipse of October 14, 2004 (Local Times)
Country or territory	City or place	Start of partial eclipse	Maximum eclipse	End of partial eclipse	Duration of eclipse (hr:min)	Maximum coverage
Russia	Krasnoyarsk	09:08:38	09:35:00	10:02:00	0:53	2.79%
Russia	Irkutsk	10:14:07	10:41:40	11:09:54	0:56	2.64%
Russia	Norilsk	09:12:59 (sunrise)	09:43:39	10:33:58	1:21	25.78%
Russia	Chita	11:09:45	11:50:08	12:31:45	1:22	8.00%
Russia	Khatanga	08:55:53	09:50:57	10:47:19	1:51	37.36%
China	Mohe	09:06:50	09:59:12	10:53:04	1:46	17.77%
Russia	Tiksi	11:01:01	12:03:01	13:05:47	2:05	52.01%
Russia	Yakutsk	11:01:16	12:03:37	13:07:09	2:06	40.09%
Russia	Verkhoyansk	12:01:57	13:05:38	14:10:06	2:08	50.65%
China	Harbin	09:20:41	10:08:31	10:57:28	1:37	10.76%
China	Mudanjiang	09:22:57	10:13:42	11:05:28	1:43	12.48%
North Korea	Pyongyang	10:46:39	11:14:25	11:42:34	0:56	1.67%
Russia	Komsomolsk-on-Amur	12:13:19	13:17:24	14:22:14	2:09	31.32%
South Korea	Seoul	10:52:11	11:18:08	11:44:24	0:52	1.31%
Russia	Vladivostok	12:26:06	13:18:24	14:11:34	1:45	13.18%
Russia	Magadan	13:13:46	14:24:12	15:34:05	2:20	59.24%
Russia	Pevek	14:20:41	15:28:22	16:34:42	2:14	77.66%
Russia	Yuzhno-Sakhalinsk	12:21:05	13:28:34	14:36:03	2:15	34.16%
Russia	Anadyr	14:29:53	15:39:30	16:46:47	2:17	82.48%
Russia	Petropavlovsk-Kamchatsky	14:25:53	15:40:00	16:52:06	2:26	62.60%
Japan	Tokyo	10:45:14	11:40:46	12:36:11	1:51	13.53%
United States	Anchorage (Note: The times listed for this location occur on October 13, 2004, local time.)	17:56:08	18:47:06	18:51:44 (sunset)	0:56	71.06%
United States	Adak	16:52:53	18:05:48	19:14:01	2:21	83.22%
United States	Unalaska	17:58:51	19:08:38	20:12:03 (sunset)	2:13	87.88%
United States Minor Outlying Islands	Midway Atoll	15:39:55	16:50:06	17:53:27	2:14	52.98%
United States Minor Outlying Islands	Wake Island	14:46:35	15:50:46	16:49:47	2:03	25.29%
Federated States of Micronesia	Palikir	14:47:03	15:02:47	15:18:11	0:31	0.29%
United States	Honolulu	17:13:58	18:05:43	18:08:03 (sunset)	0:54	36.95%
Marshall Islands	Majuro	15:36:08	16:15:17	16:52:04	1:16	6.10%
Kiribati	Tarawa	16:18:05	16:23:46	16:29:23	0:11	0.02%

== Eclipse details ==
Shown below are two tables displaying details about this particular solar eclipse. The first table outlines times at which the Moon's penumbra or umbra attains the specific parameter, and the second table describes various other parameters pertaining to this eclipse.

October 14, 2004 Solar Eclipse Times
Event	Time (UTC)
First Penumbral External Contact	2004 October 14 at 00:55:42.4 UTC
Equatorial Conjunction	2004 October 14 at 02:01:31.9 UTC
Ecliptic Conjunction	2004 October 14 at 02:49:19.6 UTC
Greatest Eclipse	2004 October 14 at 03:00:23.0 UTC
Last Penumbral External Contact	2004 October 14 at 05:05:22.2 UTC

October 14, 2004 Solar Eclipse Parameters
Parameter	Value
Eclipse Magnitude	0.92826
Eclipse Obscuration	0.90617
Gamma	1.03481
Sun Right Ascension	13h18m00.5s
Sun Declination	-08°14'10.7"
Sun Semi-Diameter	16'02.2"
Sun Equatorial Horizontal Parallax	08.8"
Moon Right Ascension	13h19m53.4s
Moon Declination	-07°20'43.5"
Moon Semi-Diameter	15'55.4"
Moon Equatorial Horizontal Parallax	0°58'26.4"
ΔT	64.6 s

== Eclipse season ==
This eclipse is part of an eclipse season, a period, roughly every six months, when eclipses occur. Only two (or occasionally three) eclipse seasons occur each year, and each season lasts about 35 days and repeats just short of six months (173 days) later; thus two full eclipse seasons always occur each year. Either two or three eclipses happen each eclipse season. In the sequence below, each eclipse is separated by a fortnight.

Eclipse season of October 2004
October 14 Descending node (new moon)	October 28 Ascending node (full moon)
Partial solar eclipse Solar Saros 124	Total lunar eclipse Lunar Saros 136

== Related eclipses ==
=== Eclipses in 2004 ===
- A partial solar eclipse on April 19.
- A total lunar eclipse on May 4.
- A partial solar eclipse on October 14.
- A total lunar eclipse on October 28.

=== Metonic ===
- Preceded by: Solar eclipse of December 25, 2000
- Followed by: Solar eclipse of August 1, 2008

=== Tzolkinex ===
- Preceded by: Solar eclipse of September 2, 1997
- Followed by: Solar eclipse of November 25, 2011

=== Half-Saros ===
- Preceded by: Lunar eclipse of October 8, 1995
- Followed by: Lunar eclipse of October 18, 2013

=== Tritos ===
- Preceded by: Solar eclipse of November 13, 1993
- Followed by: Solar eclipse of September 13, 2015

=== Solar Saros 124 ===
- Preceded by: Solar eclipse of October 3, 1986
- Followed by: Solar eclipse of October 25, 2022

=== Inex ===
- Preceded by: Solar eclipse of November 3, 1975
- Followed by: Solar eclipse of September 23, 2033

=== Triad ===
- Preceded by: Solar eclipse of December 14, 1917
- Followed by: Solar eclipse of August 15, 2091

=== Solar eclipses of 2004–2007 ===
This eclipse is a member of a semester series. An eclipse in a semester series of solar eclipses repeats approximately every 177 days and 4 hours (a semester) at alternating nodes of the Moon's orbit.

Solar eclipse series sets from 2004 to 2007
Ascending node			Descending node		
Saros	Map	Gamma	Saros	Map	Gamma
119	April 19, 2004 Partial	−1.13345	124	October 14, 2004 Partial	1.03481
129 Partial in Naiguatá, Venezuela	April 8, 2005 Hybrid	−0.34733	134 Annularity in Madrid, Spain	October 3, 2005 Annular	0.33058
139 Totality in Side, Turkey	March 29, 2006 Total	0.38433	144 Partial in São Paulo, Brazil	September 22, 2006 Annular	−0.40624
149 Partial in Jaipur, India	March 19, 2007 Partial	1.07277	154 Partial in Córdoba, Argentina	September 11, 2007 Partial	−1.12552

=== Saros 124 ===
This eclipse is a part of Saros series 124, repeating every 18 years, 11 days, and containing 73 events. The series started with a partial solar eclipse on March 6, 1049. It contains total eclipses from June 12, 1211 through September 22, 1968, and a hybrid eclipse on October 3, 1986. There are no annular eclipses in this set. The series ends at member 73 as a partial eclipse on May 11, 2347. Its eclipses are tabulated in three columns; every third eclipse in the same column is one exeligmos apart, so they all cast shadows over approximately the same parts of the Earth.

The longest duration of totality was produced by member 39 at 5 minutes, 46 seconds on May 3, 1734. All eclipses in this series occur at the Moon’s descending node of orbit.

Series members 43–64 occur between 1801 and 2200:
43	44	45
June 16, 1806	June 26, 1824	July 8, 1842
46	47	48
July 18, 1860	July 29, 1878	August 9, 1896
49	50	51
August 21, 1914	August 31, 1932	September 12, 1950
52	53	54
September 22, 1968	October 3, 1986	October 14, 2004
55	56	57
October 25, 2022	November 4, 2040	November 16, 2058
58	59	60
November 26, 2076	December 7, 2094	December 19, 2112
61	62	63
December 30, 2130	January 9, 2149	January 21, 2167
64
January 31, 2185

=== Metonic series ===
The metonic series repeats eclipses every 19 years (6939.69 days), lasting about 5 cycles. Eclipses occur in nearly the same calendar date. In addition, the octon subseries repeats 1/5 of that or every 3.8 years (1387.94 days). All eclipses in this table occur at the Moon's descending node.

21 eclipse events between May 21, 1993 and May 20, 2069
May 20–21	March 9	December 25–26	October 13–14	August 1–2
118	120	122	124	126
May 21, 1993	March 9, 1997	December 25, 2000	October 14, 2004	August 1, 2008
128	130	132	134	136
May 20, 2012	March 9, 2016	December 26, 2019	October 14, 2023	August 2, 2027
138	140	142	144	146
May 21, 2031	March 9, 2035	December 26, 2038	October 14, 2042	August 2, 2046
148	150	152	154	156
May 20, 2050	March 9, 2054	December 26, 2057	October 13, 2061	August 2, 2065
158
May 20, 2069

=== Tritos series ===
This eclipse is a part of a tritos cycle, repeating at alternating nodes every 135 synodic months (≈ 3986.63 days, or 11 years minus 1 month). Their appearance and longitude are irregular due to a lack of synchronization with the anomalistic month (period of perigee), but groupings of 3 tritos cycles (≈ 33 years minus 3 months) come close (≈ 434.044 anomalistic months), so eclipses are similar in these groupings.

Series members between 1801 and 2200
March 25, 1819 (Saros 107)	February 23, 1830 (Saros 108)	January 22, 1841 (Saros 109)		November 21, 1862 (Saros 111)
		August 20, 1895 (Saros 114)	July 21, 1906 (Saros 115)	June 19, 1917 (Saros 116)
May 19, 1928 (Saros 117)	April 19, 1939 (Saros 118)	March 18, 1950 (Saros 119)	February 15, 1961 (Saros 120)	January 16, 1972 (Saros 121)
December 15, 1982 (Saros 122)	November 13, 1993 (Saros 123)	October 14, 2004 (Saros 124)	September 13, 2015 (Saros 125)	August 12, 2026 (Saros 126)
July 13, 2037 (Saros 127)	June 11, 2048 (Saros 128)	May 11, 2059 (Saros 129)	April 11, 2070 (Saros 130)	March 10, 2081 (Saros 131)
February 7, 2092 (Saros 132)	January 8, 2103 (Saros 133)	December 8, 2113 (Saros 134)	November 6, 2124 (Saros 135)	October 7, 2135 (Saros 136)
September 6, 2146 (Saros 137)	August 5, 2157 (Saros 138)	July 5, 2168 (Saros 139)	June 5, 2179 (Saros 140)	May 4, 2190 (Saros 141)

=== Inex series ===
This eclipse is a part of the long period inex cycle, repeating at alternating nodes, every 358 synodic months (≈ 10,571.95 days, or 29 years minus 20 days). Their appearance and longitude are irregular due to a lack of synchronization with the anomalistic month (period of perigee). However, groupings of 3 inex cycles (≈ 87 years minus 2 months) comes close (≈ 1,151.02 anomalistic months), so eclipses are similar in these groupings.

Series members between 1801 and 2200
March 4, 1802 (Saros 117)	February 12, 1831 (Saros 118)	January 23, 1860 (Saros 119)
January 1, 1889 (Saros 120)	December 14, 1917 (Saros 121)	November 23, 1946 (Saros 122)
November 3, 1975 (Saros 123)	October 14, 2004 (Saros 124)	September 23, 2033 (Saros 125)
September 3, 2062 (Saros 126)	August 15, 2091 (Saros 127)	July 25, 2120 (Saros 128)
July 5, 2149 (Saros 129)	June 16, 2178 (Saros 130)	
