= Solar eclipse of May 10, 1994 =

20th-century annular solar eclipse

- Annular eclipse
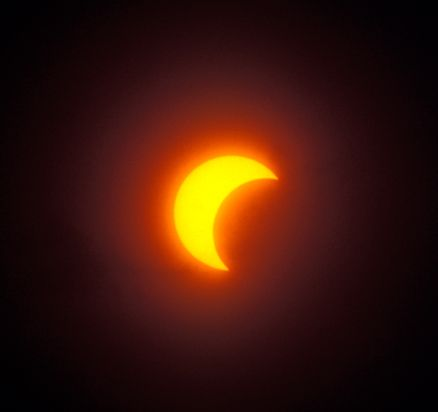
- Partial from Bismarck, North Dakota, USA

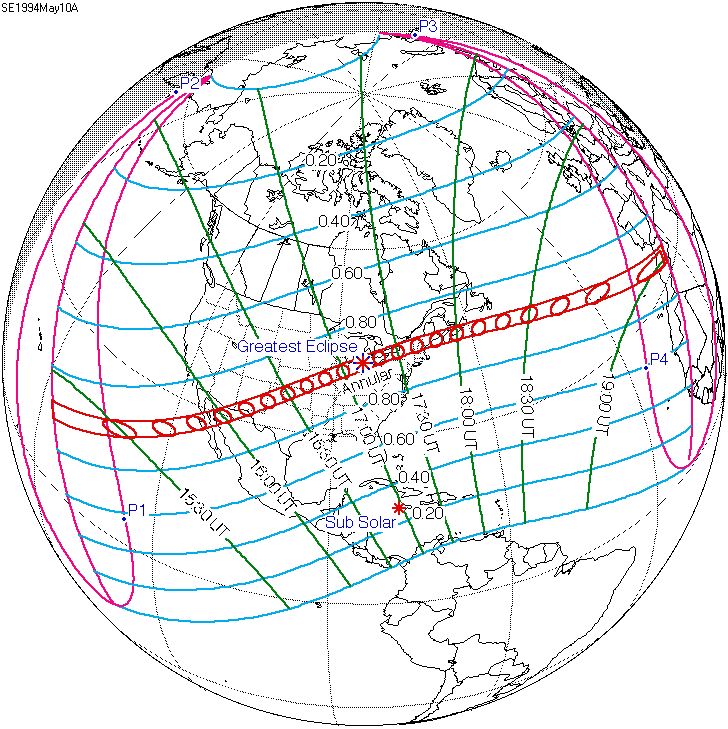
- Map
- Gamma: 0.4077
- Magnitude: 0.9431

Maximum eclipse
- Duration: 373 s (6 min 13 s)
- Coordinates: 41.5°N 84.1°W
- Max. width of band: 230 km (140 mi)

Times (UTC)
- Greatest eclipse: 17:12:27

References
- Saros: 128 (57 of 73)
- Catalog # (SE5000): 9495

An annular solar eclipse occurred at the Moon's descending node of orbit on Tuesday, May 10, 1994, with a magnitude of 0.9431. A solar eclipse occurs when the Moon passes between Earth and the Sun, thereby totally or partly obscuring the image of the Sun for a viewer on Earth. An annular solar eclipse occurs when the Moon's apparent diameter is smaller than the Sun's, blocking most of the Sun's light and causing the Sun to look like an annulus (ring). An annular eclipse appears as a partial eclipse over a region of the Earth thousands of kilometres wide. Occurring about 1.6 days after apogee (on May 9, 1994, at 3:20 UTC), the Moon's apparent diameter was smaller.

The path of annularity crossed four states of Mexico (Baja California Sur, Baja California, Sonora and Chihuahua), parts of Arizona, New Mexico, Texas, Oklahoma, Kansas, Missouri, Illinois, Indiana, Michigan, Ohio, Pennsylvania, New York, Massachusetts, Vermont, New Hampshire and Maine in the United States, the Canadian provinces of Ontario, Nova Scotia and the southeastern tip of Quebec, the Azores Islands except Santa Maria Island, and part of Morocco including the capital city Rabat. The eclipse reached its moment of "greatest eclipse" in the United States near Wauseon, Ohio, about 35 miles west of Toledo, Ohio. Niagara Falls was also covered by the path of annularity. A partial eclipse was visible for parts of eastern Russia, North America, Central America, the Caribbean, Western Europe, and West Africa.

The Columbus Crew were originally named the "Columbus Eclipse" in their Major League Soccer bid in honor of the event.

== Eclipse timing ==
=== Places experiencing annular eclipse ===
Solar Eclipse of May 10, 1994 (Local Times)
Country or territory	City or place	Start of partial eclipse	Start of annular eclipse	Maximum eclipse	End of annular eclipse	End of partial eclipse	Duration of annularity (min:s)	Duration of eclipse (hr:min)	Maximum coverage
Mexico	Hermosillo	07:36:45	08:55:54	08:58:33	09:01:11	10:36:12	5:17	2:59	88.42%
Mexico	Ciudad Juárez	08:43:51	10:06:53	10:09:42	10:12:30	11:51:35	5:37	3:08	88.62%
United States	El Paso	08:43:53	10:06:54	10:09:44	10:12:32	11:51:36	5:38	3:08	88.62%
United States	Amarillo	09:53:58	11:21:38	11:23:56	11:26:13	13:08:48	4:35	3:15	88.80%
United States	Oklahoma City	09:58:42	11:30:47	11:32:26	11:34:05	13:20:30	3:18	3:22	88.93%
United States	Wichita	10:03:18	11:35:25	11:36:51	11:38:16	13:23:26	2:51	3:20	88.93%
United States	Jefferson City	10:11:20	11:46:02	11:49:01	11:52:01	13:37:33	5:59	3:26	89.03%
United States	Columbia	10:11:51	11:46:16	11:49:16	11:52:17	13:37:24	6:01	3:26	89.03%
United States	St. Louis	10:14:13	11:51:43	11:53:29	11:55:15	13:42:38	3:32	3:28	89.07%
United States	Toledo	11:30:40	13:09:51	13:12:56	13:16:03	14:59:29	6:12	3:29	89.09%
United States	Detroit	11:32:38	13:11:57	13:14:40	13:17:25	15:00:27	5:28	3:28	89.08%
Canada	Windsor	11:32:37	13:11:54	13:14:42	13:17:29	15:00:30	5:35	3:28	89.08%
United States	Cleveland	11:33:38	13:14:38	13:17:05	13:19:32	15:03:33	4:54	3:30	89.10%
Canada	London	11:36:58	13:17:05	13:19:25	13:21:45	15:04:10	4:40	3:27	89.07%
Canada	Hamilton	11:39:56	13:20:22	13:22:48	13:25:13	15:06:56	4:51	3:27	89.07%
Canada	Mississauga	11:40:54	13:22:05	13:23:32	13:25:00	15:07:15	2:55	3:26	89.06%
Canada	Toronto	11:41:29	13:22:45	13:24:10	13:25:36	15:07:45	2:51	3:26	89.06%
United States	Buffalo	11:41:12	13:21:45	13:24:50	13:27:55	15:09:06	6:10	3:28	89.08%
United States	Rochester	11:44:04	13:24:52	13:27:56	13:31:01	15:11:30	6:09	3:27	89.07%
United States	Albany	11:51:19	13:36:13	13:36:46	13:37:19	15:19:06	1:06	3:28	89.05%
United States	Montpelier	11:55:49	13:37:01	13:39:48	13:42:36	15:20:02	5:35	3:24	89.00%
United States	Concord	11:56:48	13:39:53	13:42:01	13:44:10	15:22:38	4:17	3:26	89.01%
United States	Augusta	12:01:50	13:42:58	13:45:57	13:48:57	15:24:35	5:59	3:23	88.97%
Canada	Saint John	13:10:49	14:52:00	14:53:35	14:55:10	16:29:07	3:10	3:18	88.89%
Canada	Halifax	13:15:51	14:55:53	14:58:49	15:01:44	16:33:10	5:51	3:17	88.85%
Portugal	Ponta Delgada	17:33:12	18:51:46	18:52:58	18:54:10	20:02:22	2:24	2:29	87.54%
Morocco	Fez	17:51:07	18:57:35	18:58:00	18:58:24	19:10:29 (sunset)	0:49	1:19	86.69%
Morocco	Rabat	17:50:38	18:56:36	18:58:27	19:00:20	19:17:49 (sunset)	3:44	1:27	86.75%
Morocco	Casablanca	17:50:53	18:56:47	18:59:04	19:01:21	19:20:06 (sunset)	4:34	1:29	86.77%
Morocco	El Jadida	17:51:00	18:57:24	18:59:35	19:01:47	19:22:59 (sunset)	4:23	1:32	86.80%

=== Places experiencing partial eclipse ===
Solar Eclipse of May 10, 1994 (Local Times)
Country or territory	City or place	Start of partial eclipse	Maximum eclipse	End of partial eclipse	Duration of eclipse (hr:min)	Maximum coverage
Mexico	Mexico City	08:33:56	09:58:09	11:40:40	3:07	47.99%
Mexico	Tijuana	07:41:15	08:58:29	10:29:09	2:48	77.36%
United States	Los Angeles	07:44:04	09:00:13	10:29:04	2:45	72.14%
Mexico	Mexicali	07:41:46	09:00:16	10:32:35	2:51	79.19%
Mexico	Chihuahua	08:38:44	10:04:17	11:46:51	3:08	84.05%
Cuba	Havana	11:11:55	12:50:12	14:39:23	3:27	34.60%
United States	Washington, D.C.	11:39:18	13:26:46	15:13:56	3:35	79.88%
United States	New York City	11:48:24	13:35:31	15:19:38	3:31	84.00%
Canada	Montreal	11:55:26	13:37:51	15:17:16	3:22	87.44%
Bermuda	Hamilton	13:10:17	15:00:08	16:37:52	3:28	52.45%
Saint Pierre and Miquelon	Saint-Pierre	14:32:44	16:10:32	17:38:31	3:06	85.36%
Italy	Rome	19:45:23	20:14:44	20:17:52 (sunset)	0:32	28.46%
Germany	Berlin	19:37:53	20:30:33	20:47:35 (sunset)	1:10	32.27%
Isle of Man	Douglas	18:31:54	19:32:38	20:29:07	1:57	39.85%
Netherlands	Amsterdam	19:36:40	20:33:33	21:20:59 (sunset)	1:44	37.57%
Ireland	Dublin	18:31:45	19:33:56	20:31:34	2:00	42.51%
Germany	Frankfurt	19:39:09	20:35:18	20:57:21 (sunset)	1:18	39.40%
Belgium	Brussels	19:37:46	20:35:43	21:17:21 (sunset)	1:40	40.78%
United Kingdom	London	18:35:55	19:35:51	20:31:34	1:56	42.36%
Luxembourg	Luxembourg	19:39:08	20:36:47	21:05:50 (sunset)	1:27	42.02%
Switzerland	Zurich	19:41:15	20:38:41	20:48:52 (sunset)	1:08	44.85%
France	Paris	19:38:56	20:38:51	21:18:25 (sunset)	1:39	46.08%
Monaco	Monaco	19:43:59	20:39:39	20:42:53 (sunset)	0:59	52.82%
Algeria	Algiers	18:49:34	19:39:51	19:43:49 (sunset)	0:54	62.33%
Andorra	Andorra la Vella	19:44:15	20:46:53	21:03:17 (sunset)	1:19	60.84%
Spain	Madrid	19:44:54	20:50:45	21:19:03 (sunset)	1:34	70.28%
Portugal	Lisbon	19:44:35	20:53:41	21:36:57 (sunset)	1:52	79.23%
Gibraltar	Gibraltar	19:48:46	20:55:54	21:16:10 (sunset)	1:27	82.64%
Morocco	Marrakesh	17:53:03	19:01:05	19:17:51 (sunset)	1:25	86.12%
Western Sahara	Laayoune	17:57:07	19:06:07	19:30:49 (sunset)	1:34	69.05%

== Gallery ==
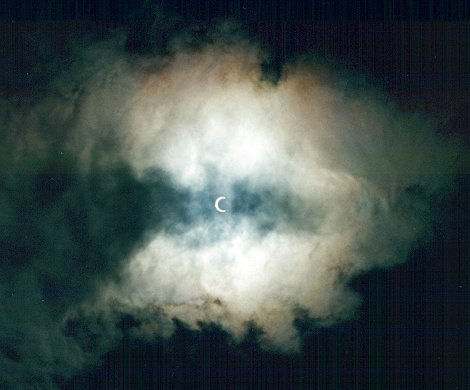
Partial from Montréal, Canada

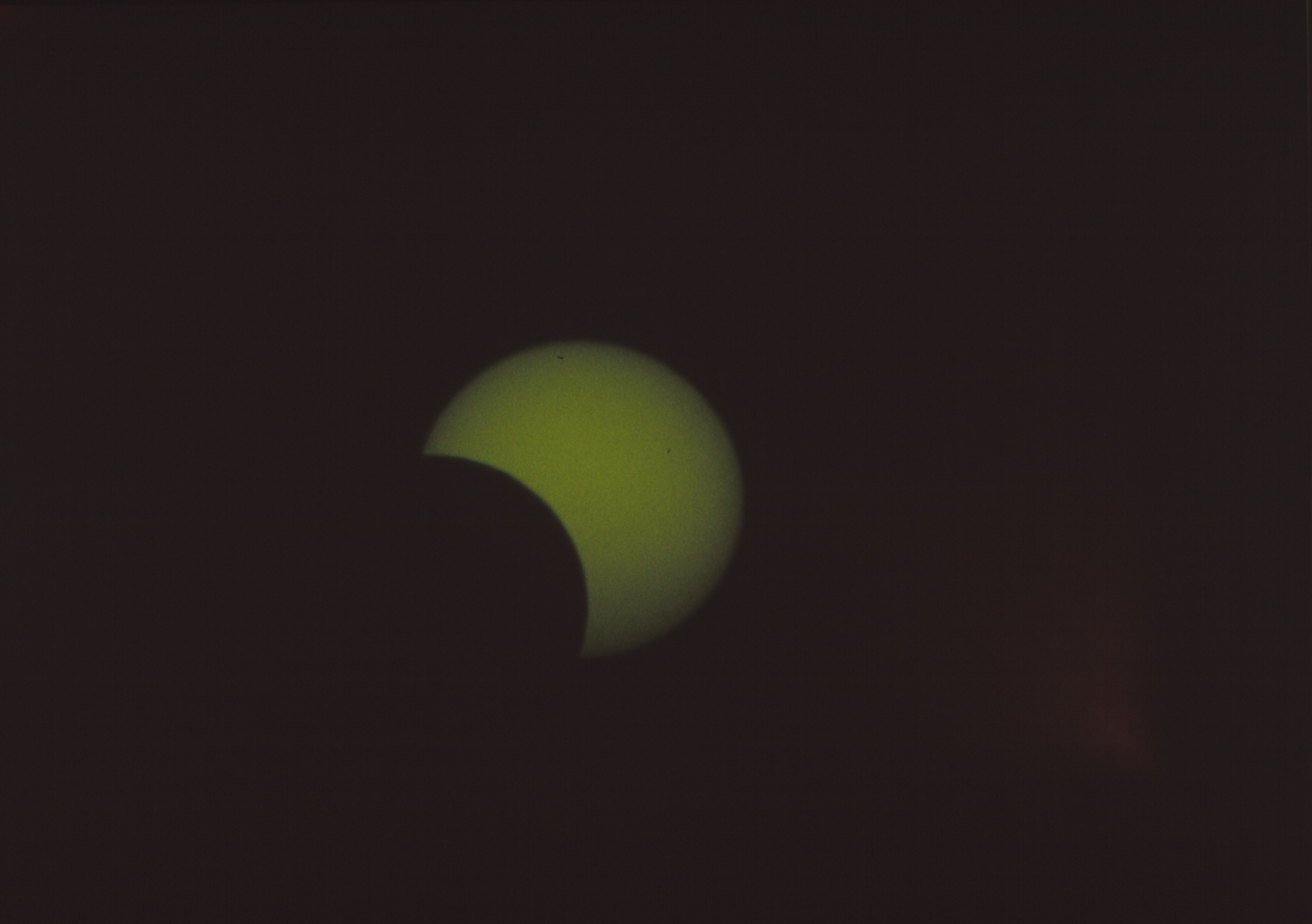
Partial from Schwentinental, Germany

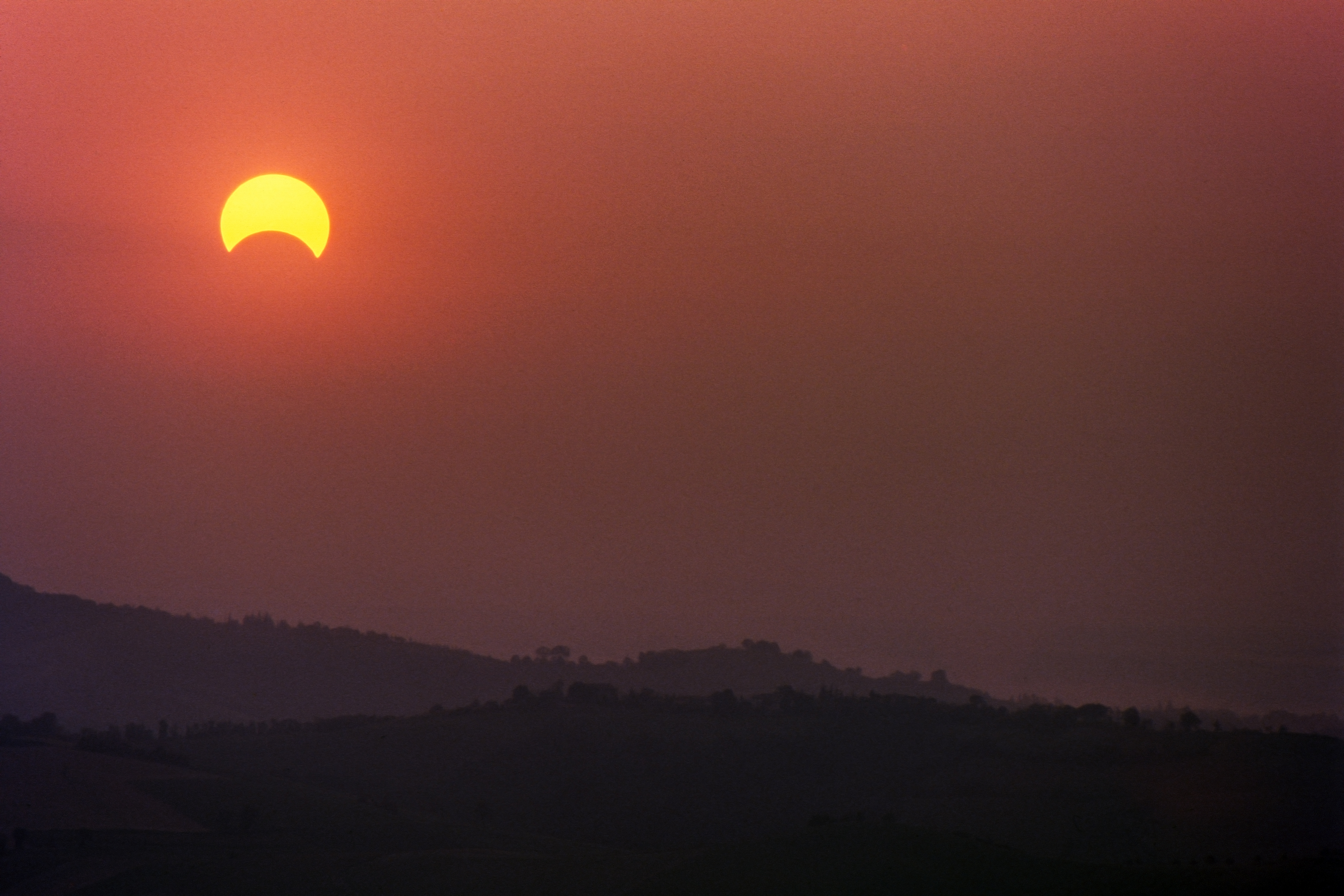
Partial from Albinea, Italy

== Eclipse details ==
Shown below are two tables displaying details about this particular solar eclipse. The first table outlines times at which the Moon's penumbra or umbra attains the specific parameter, and the second table describes various other parameters pertaining to this eclipse.

May 10, 1994 Solar Eclipse Times
Event	Time (UTC)
First Penumbral External Contact	1994 May 10 at 14:13:11.3 UTC
First Umbral External Contact	1994 May 10 at 15:21:36.4 UTC
First Central Line	1994 May 10 at 15:24:17.3 UTC
First Umbral Internal Contact	1994 May 10 at 15:26:58.9 UTC
First Penumbral Internal Contact	1994 May 10 at 16:55:59.3 UTC
Ecliptic Conjunction	1994 May 10 at 17:07:34.4 UTC
Greatest Eclipse	1994 May 10 at 17:12:26.5 UTC
Greatest Duration	1994 May 10 at 17:17:41.1 UTC
Equatorial Conjunction	1994 May 10 at 17:20:50.9 UTC
Last Penumbral Internal Contact	1994 May 10 at 17:28:40.2 UTC
Last Umbral Internal Contact	1994 May 10 at 18:57:48.7 UTC
Last Central Line	1994 May 10 at 19:00:29.5 UTC
Last Umbral External Contact	1994 May 10 at 19:03:09.5 UTC
Last Penumbral External Contact	1994 May 10 at 20:11:35.7 UTC

May 10, 1994 Solar Eclipse Parameters
Parameter	Value
Eclipse Magnitude	0.94315
Eclipse Obscuration	0.88953
Gamma	0.40771
Sun Right Ascension	03h09m27.2s
Sun Declination	+17°41'21.5"
Sun Semi-Diameter	15'50.2"
Sun Equatorial Horizontal Parallax	08.7"
Moon Right Ascension	03h09m11.3s
Moon Declination	+18°03'01.1"
Moon Semi-Diameter	14'44.0"
Moon Equatorial Horizontal Parallax	0°54'04.4"
ΔT	60.3 s

== Eclipse season ==
This eclipse is part of an eclipse season, a period, roughly every six months, when eclipses occur. Only two (or occasionally three) eclipse seasons occur each year, and each season lasts about 35 days and repeats just short of six months (173 days) later; thus two full eclipse seasons always occur each year. Either two or three eclipses happen each eclipse season. In the sequence below, each eclipse is separated by a fortnight.

Eclipse season of May 1994
May 10 Descending node (new moon)	May 25 Ascending node (full moon)
Annular solar eclipse Solar Saros 128	Partial lunar eclipse Lunar Saros 140

== Related eclipses ==
=== Eclipses in 1994 ===
- An annular solar eclipse on May 10.
- A partial lunar eclipse on May 25.
- A total solar eclipse on November 3.
- A penumbral lunar eclipse on November 18.

=== Metonic ===
- Preceded by: Solar eclipse of July 22, 1990
- Followed by: Solar eclipse of February 26, 1998

=== Tzolkinex ===
- Preceded by: Solar eclipse of March 29, 1987
- Followed by: Solar eclipse of June 21, 2001

=== Half-Saros ===
- Preceded by: Lunar eclipse of May 4, 1985
- Followed by: Lunar eclipse of May 16, 2003

=== Tritos ===
- Preceded by: Solar eclipse of June 11, 1983
- Followed by: Solar eclipse of April 8, 2005

=== Solar Saros 128 ===
- Preceded by: Solar eclipse of April 29, 1976
- Followed by: Solar eclipse of May 20, 2012

=== Inex ===
- Preceded by: Solar eclipse of May 30, 1965
- Followed by: Solar eclipse of April 20, 2023

=== Triad ===
- Preceded by: Solar eclipse of July 10, 1907
- Followed by: Solar eclipse of March 10, 2081

=== Solar eclipses of 1993–1996 ===
This eclipse is a member of a semester series. An eclipse in a semester series of solar eclipses repeats approximately every 177 days and 4 hours (a semester) at alternating nodes of the Moon's orbit.

Solar eclipse series sets from 1993 to 1996
Descending node			Ascending node		
Saros	Map	Gamma	Saros	Map	Gamma
118	May 21, 1993 Partial	1.1372	123	November 13, 1993 Partial	−1.0411
128 Partial in Bismarck, ND, USA	May 10, 1994 Annular	0.4077	133 Totality in Bolivia	November 3, 1994 Total	−0.3522
138	April 29, 1995 Annular	−0.3382	143 Totality in Dundlod, India	October 24, 1995 Total	0.3518
148	April 17, 1996 Partial	−1.058	153	October 12, 1996 Partial	1.1227

=== Saros 128 ===
This eclipse is a part of Saros series 128, repeating every 18 years, 11 days, and containing 73 events. The series started with a partial solar eclipse on August 29, 984 AD. It contains total eclipses from May 16, 1417 through June 18, 1471; hybrid eclipses from June 28, 1489 through July 31, 1543; and annular eclipses from August 11, 1561 through July 25, 2120. The series ends at member 73 as a partial eclipse on November 1, 2282. Its eclipses are tabulated in three columns; every third eclipse in the same column is one exeligmos apart, so they all cast shadows over approximately the same parts of the Earth.

The longest duration of totality was produced by member 27 at 1 minutes, 45 seconds on June 7, 1453, and the longest duration of annularity was produced by member 48 at 8 minutes, 35 seconds on February 1, 1832. All eclipses in this series occur at the Moon’s descending node of orbit.

Series members 47–68 occur between 1801 and 2200:
47	48	49
January 21, 1814	February 1, 1832	February 12, 1850
50	51	52
February 23, 1868	March 5, 1886	March 17, 1904
53	54	55
March 28, 1922	April 7, 1940	April 19, 1958
56	57	58
April 29, 1976	May 10, 1994	May 20, 2012
59	60	61
June 1, 2030	June 11, 2048	June 22, 2066
62	63	64
July 3, 2084	July 15, 2102	July 25, 2120
65	66	67
August 5, 2138	August 16, 2156	August 27, 2174
68
September 6, 2192

=== Metonic series ===
The metonic series repeats eclipses every 19 years (6939.69 days), lasting about 5 cycles. Eclipses occur in nearly the same calendar date. In addition, the octon subseries repeats 1/5 of that or every 3.8 years (1387.94 days). All eclipses in this table occur at the Moon's descending node.

21 eclipse events between July 22, 1971 and July 22, 2047
July 22	May 9–11	February 26–27	December 14–15	October 2–3
116	118	120	122	124
July 22, 1971	May 11, 1975	February 26, 1979	December 15, 1982	October 3, 1986
126	128	130	132	134
July 22, 1990	May 10, 1994	February 26, 1998	December 14, 2001	October 3, 2005
136	138	140	142	144
July 22, 2009	May 10, 2013	February 26, 2017	December 14, 2020	October 2, 2024
146	148	150	152	154
July 22, 2028	May 9, 2032	February 27, 2036	December 15, 2039	October 3, 2043
156
July 22, 2047

=== Tritos series ===
This eclipse is a part of a tritos cycle, repeating at alternating nodes every 135 synodic months (≈ 3986.63 days, or 11 years minus 1 month). Their appearance and longitude are irregular due to a lack of synchronization with the anomalistic month (period of perigee), but groupings of 3 tritos cycles (≈ 33 years minus 3 months) come close (≈ 434.044 anomalistic months), so eclipses are similar in these groupings.

Series members between 1801 and 2200
October 19, 1808 (Saros 111)	September 19, 1819 (Saros 112)	August 18, 1830 (Saros 113)	July 18, 1841 (Saros 114)	June 17, 1852 (Saros 115)
May 17, 1863 (Saros 116)	April 16, 1874 (Saros 117)	March 16, 1885 (Saros 118)	February 13, 1896 (Saros 119)	January 14, 1907 (Saros 120)
December 14, 1917 (Saros 121)	November 12, 1928 (Saros 122)	October 12, 1939 (Saros 123)	September 12, 1950 (Saros 124)	August 11, 1961 (Saros 125)
July 10, 1972 (Saros 126)	June 11, 1983 (Saros 127)	May 10, 1994 (Saros 128)	April 8, 2005 (Saros 129)	March 9, 2016 (Saros 130)
February 6, 2027 (Saros 131)	January 5, 2038 (Saros 132)	December 5, 2048 (Saros 133)	November 5, 2059 (Saros 134)	October 4, 2070 (Saros 135)
September 3, 2081 (Saros 136)	August 3, 2092 (Saros 137)	July 4, 2103 (Saros 138)	June 3, 2114 (Saros 139)	May 3, 2125 (Saros 140)
April 1, 2136 (Saros 141)	March 2, 2147 (Saros 142)	January 30, 2158 (Saros 143)	December 29, 2168 (Saros 144)	November 28, 2179 (Saros 145)
October 29, 2190 (Saros 146)

=== Inex series ===
This eclipse is a part of the long period inex cycle, repeating at alternating nodes, every 358 synodic months (≈ 10,571.95 days, or 29 years minus 20 days). Their appearance and longitude are irregular due to a lack of synchronization with the anomalistic month (period of perigee). However, groupings of 3 inex cycles (≈ 87 years minus 2 months) comes close (≈ 1,151.02 anomalistic months), so eclipses are similar in these groupings.

Series members between 1801 and 2200
September 7, 1820 (Saros 122)	August 18, 1849 (Saros 123)	July 29, 1878 (Saros 124)
July 10, 1907 (Saros 125)	June 19, 1936 (Saros 126)	May 30, 1965 (Saros 127)
May 10, 1994 (Saros 128)	April 20, 2023 (Saros 129)	March 30, 2052 (Saros 130)
March 10, 2081 (Saros 131)	February 18, 2110 (Saros 132)	January 30, 2139 (Saros 133)
January 10, 2168 (Saros 134)	December 19, 2196 (Saros 135)	
