= Solar eclipse of November 12, 1928 =

20th-century partial solar eclipse

- Partial eclipse
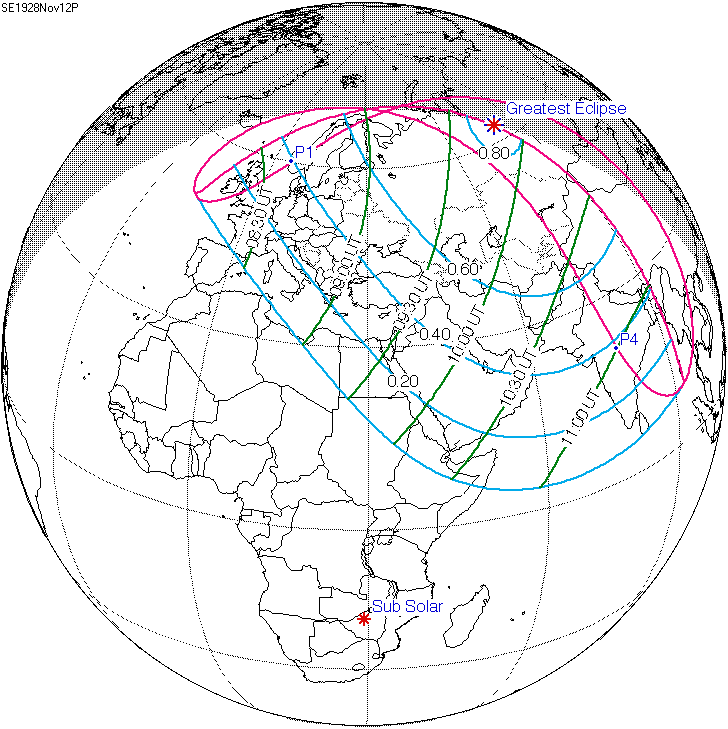
- Map
- Gamma: 1.0861
- Magnitude: 0.8078

Maximum eclipse
- Coordinates: 62.6°N 81.1°E

Times (UTC)
- Greatest eclipse: 9:48:24

References
- Saros: 122 (53 of 70)
- Catalog # (SE5000): 9348

A partial solar eclipse occurred at the Moon's descending node of orbit on Monday, November 12, 1928, with a magnitude of 0.8078. A solar eclipse occurs when the Moon passes between Earth and the Sun, thereby totally or partly obscuring the image of the Sun for a viewer on Earth. A partial solar eclipse occurs in the polar regions of the Earth when the center of the Moon's shadow misses the Earth.

A partial eclipse was visible for parts of Northeast Africa, Europe, West Asia, Central Asia, and South Asia.

== Eclipse details ==
Shown below are two tables displaying details about this particular solar eclipse. The first table outlines times at which the Moon's penumbra or umbra attains the specific parameter, and the second table describes various other parameters pertaining to this eclipse.

November 12, 1928 Solar Eclipse Times
| Event | Time (UTC) |
|---|---|
| First Penumbral External Contact | 1928 November 12 at 07:33:47.2 UTC |
| Equatorial Conjunction | 1928 November 12 at 08:58:05.5 UTC |
| Ecliptic Conjunction | 1928 November 12 at 09:35:37.7 UTC |
| Greatest Eclipse | 1928 November 12 at 09:48:24.3 UTC |
| Last Penumbral External Contact | 1928 November 12 at 12:03:24.1 UTC |

November 12, 1928 Solar Eclipse Parameters
| Parameter | Value |
|---|---|
| Eclipse Magnitude | 0.80778 |
| Eclipse Obscuration | 0.72803 |
| Gamma | 1.08611 |
| Sun Right Ascension | 15h09m18.3s |
| Sun Declination | -17°41'18.0" |
| Sun Semi-Diameter | 16'09.8" |
| Sun Equatorial Horizontal Parallax | 08.9" |
| Moon Right Ascension | 15h10m47.3s |
| Moon Declination | -16°46'39.9" |
| Moon Semi-Diameter | 14'44.8" |
| Moon Equatorial Horizontal Parallax | 0°54'07.3" |
| ΔT | 24.1 s |

== Eclipse season ==
This eclipse is part of an eclipse season, a period, roughly every six months, when eclipses occur. Only two (or occasionally three) eclipse seasons occur each year, and each season lasts about 35 days and repeats just short of six months (173 days) later; thus two full eclipse seasons always occur each year. Either two or three eclipses happen each eclipse season. In the sequence below, each eclipse is separated by a fortnight.

Eclipse season of November 1928
| November 12 Descending node (new moon) | November 27 Ascending node (full moon) |
|---|---|
| Partial solar eclipse Solar Saros 122 | Total lunar eclipse Lunar Saros 134 |

== Related eclipses ==
=== Eclipses in 1928 ===
- A non-central total solar eclipse on May 19.
- A total lunar eclipse on June 3.
- A partial solar eclipse on June 17.
- A partial solar eclipse on November 12.
- A total lunar eclipse on November 27.

=== Metonic ===
- Preceded by: Solar eclipse of January 24, 1925
- Followed by: Solar eclipse of August 31, 1932

=== Tzolkinex ===
- Preceded by: Solar eclipse of October 1, 1921
- Followed by: Solar eclipse of December 25, 1935

=== Half-Saros ===
- Preceded by: Lunar eclipse of November 7, 1919
- Followed by: Lunar eclipse of November 18, 1937

=== Tritos ===
- Preceded by: Solar eclipse of December 14, 1917
- Followed by: Solar eclipse of October 12, 1939

=== Solar Saros 122 ===
- Preceded by: Solar eclipse of November 2, 1910
- Followed by: Solar eclipse of November 23, 1946

=== Inex ===
- Preceded by: Solar eclipse of December 3, 1899
- Followed by: Solar eclipse of October 23, 1957

=== Triad ===
- Preceded by: Solar eclipse of January 11, 1842
- Followed by: Solar eclipse of September 13, 2015

=== Solar eclipses of 1928–1931 ===
This eclipse is a member of a semester series. An eclipse in a semester series of solar eclipses repeats approximately every 177 days and 4 hours (a semester) at alternating nodes of the Moon's orbit.

The partial solar eclipse on June 17, 1928 occurs in the previous lunar year eclipse set, and the partial solar eclipse on September 12, 1931 occurs in the next lunar year eclipse set.

Solar eclipse series sets from 1928 to 1931
| Ascending node | | | Descending node | | |
| Saros | Map | Gamma | Saros | Map | Gamma |
| 117 | May 19, 1928 Total (non-central) | 1.0048 | 122 | November 12, 1928 Partial | 1.0861 |
| 127 | May 9, 1929 Total | −0.2887 | 132 | November 1, 1929 Annular | 0.3514 |
| 137 | April 28, 1930 Hybrid | 0.473 | 142 | October 21, 1930 Total | −0.3804 |
| 147 | April 18, 1931 Partial | 1.2643 | 152 | October 11, 1931 Partial | −1.0607 |

=== Saros 122 ===
This eclipse is a part of Saros series 122, repeating every 18 years, 11 days, and containing 70 events. The series started with a partial solar eclipse on April 17, 991 AD. It contains total eclipses from July 12, 1135 through August 3, 1171; hybrid eclipses on August 13, 1189 and August 25, 1207; and annular eclipses from September 4, 1225 through October 10, 1874. The series ends at member 70 as a partial eclipse on May 17, 2235. Its eclipses are tabulated in three columns; every third eclipse in the same column is one exeligmos apart, so they all cast shadows over approximately the same parts of the Earth.

The longest duration of totality was produced by member 9 at 1 minutes, 25 seconds on July 12, 1135, and the longest duration of annularity was produced by member 50 at 6 minutes, 28 seconds on October 10, 1874. All eclipses in this series occur at the Moon’s descending node of orbit.

Series members 46–68 occur between 1801 and 2200:
| 46 | 47 | 48 |
|---|---|---|
| August 28, 1802 | September 7, 1820 | September 18, 1838 |
| 49 | 50 | 51 |
| September 29, 1856 | October 10, 1874 | October 20, 1892 |
| 52 | 53 | 54 |
| November 2, 1910 | November 12, 1928 | November 23, 1946 |
| 55 | 56 | 57 |
| December 4, 1964 | December 15, 1982 | December 25, 2000 |
| 58 | 59 | 60 |
| January 6, 2019 | January 16, 2037 | January 27, 2055 |
| 61 | 62 | 63 |
| February 7, 2073 | February 18, 2091 | March 1, 2109 |
| 64 | 65 | 66 |
| March 13, 2127 | March 23, 2145 | April 3, 2163 |
| 67 | 68 | |
| April 14, 2181 | April 25, 2199 | |

=== Metonic series ===
The metonic series repeats eclipses every 19 years (6939.69 days), lasting about 5 cycles. Eclipses occur in nearly the same calendar date. In addition, the octon subseries repeats 1/5 of that or every 3.8 years (1387.94 days). All eclipses in this table occur at the Moon's descending node.

22 eclipse events between April 8, 1902 and August 31, 1989
| April 7–8 | January 24–25 | November 12 | August 31–September 1 | June 19–20 |
| 108 | 110 | 112 | 114 | 116 |
|---|---|---|---|---|
| April 8, 1902 | | | August 31, 1913 | June 19, 1917 |
| 118 | 120 | 122 | 124 | 126 |
| April 8, 1921 | January 24, 1925 | November 12, 1928 | August 31, 1932 | June 19, 1936 |
| 128 | 130 | 132 | 134 | 136 |
| April 7, 1940 | January 25, 1944 | November 12, 1947 | September 1, 1951 | June 20, 1955 |
| 138 | 140 | 142 | 144 | 146 |
| April 8, 1959 | January 25, 1963 | November 12, 1966 | August 31, 1970 | June 20, 1974 |
| 148 | 150 | 152 | 154 | |
| April 7, 1978 | January 25, 1982 | November 12, 1985 | August 31, 1989 | |

=== Tritos series ===
This eclipse is a part of a tritos cycle, repeating at alternating nodes every 135 synodic months (≈ 3986.63 days, or 11 years minus 1 month). Their appearance and longitude are irregular due to a lack of synchronization with the anomalistic month (period of perigee), but groupings of 3 tritos cycles (≈ 33 years minus 3 months) come close (≈ 434.044 anomalistic months), so eclipses are similar in these groupings.

Series members between 1801 and 2200
| October 19, 1808 (Saros 111) | September 19, 1819 (Saros 112) | August 18, 1830 (Saros 113) | July 18, 1841 (Saros 114) | June 17, 1852 (Saros 115) |
| May 17, 1863 (Saros 116) | April 16, 1874 (Saros 117) | March 16, 1885 (Saros 118) | February 13, 1896 (Saros 119) | January 14, 1907 (Saros 120) |
| December 14, 1917 (Saros 121) | November 12, 1928 (Saros 122) | October 12, 1939 (Saros 123) | September 12, 1950 (Saros 124) | August 11, 1961 (Saros 125) |
| July 10, 1972 (Saros 126) | June 11, 1983 (Saros 127) | May 10, 1994 (Saros 128) | April 8, 2005 (Saros 129) | March 9, 2016 (Saros 130) |
| February 6, 2027 (Saros 131) | January 5, 2038 (Saros 132) | December 5, 2048 (Saros 133) | November 5, 2059 (Saros 134) | October 4, 2070 (Saros 135) |
| September 3, 2081 (Saros 136) | August 3, 2092 (Saros 137) | July 4, 2103 (Saros 138) | June 3, 2114 (Saros 139) | May 3, 2125 (Saros 140) |
| April 1, 2136 (Saros 141) | March 2, 2147 (Saros 142) | January 30, 2158 (Saros 143) | December 29, 2168 (Saros 144) | November 28, 2179 (Saros 145) |
October 29, 2190 (Saros 146)

=== Inex series ===
This eclipse is a part of the long period inex cycle, repeating at alternating nodes, every 358 synodic months (≈ 10,571.95 days, or 29 years minus 20 days). Their appearance and longitude are irregular due to a lack of synchronization with the anomalistic month (period of perigee). However, groupings of 3 inex cycles (≈ 87 years minus 2 months) comes close (≈ 1,151.02 anomalistic months), so eclipses are similar in these groupings.

Series members between 1801 and 2200
| February 1, 1813 (Saros 118) | January 11, 1842 (Saros 119) | December 22, 1870 (Saros 120) |
| December 3, 1899 (Saros 121) | November 12, 1928 (Saros 122) | October 23, 1957 (Saros 123) |
| October 3, 1986 (Saros 124) | September 13, 2015 (Saros 125) | August 23, 2044 (Saros 126) |
| August 3, 2073 (Saros 127) | July 15, 2102 (Saros 128) | June 25, 2131 (Saros 129) |
| June 4, 2160 (Saros 130) | May 15, 2189 (Saros 131) | |
