= Solar eclipse of January 14, 1907 =

Total eclipse

- Total eclipse
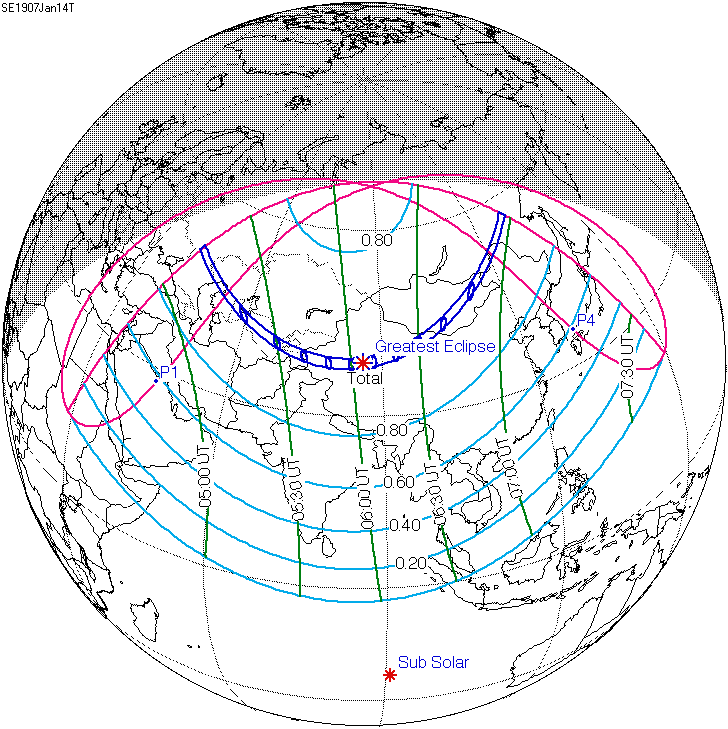
- Map
- Gamma: 0.8628
- Magnitude: 1.0281

Maximum eclipse
- Duration: 145 s (2 min 25 s)
- Coordinates: 38.3°N 86.4°E
- Max. width of band: 189 km (117 mi)

Times (UTC)
- Greatest eclipse: 6:05:43

References
- Saros: 120 (55 of 71)
- Catalog # (SE5000): 9297

A total solar eclipse occurred at the Moon's descending node of orbit on Monday, January 14, 1907, with a magnitude of 1.0281. A solar eclipse occurs when the Moon passes between Earth and the Sun, thereby totally or partly obscuring the image of the Sun for a viewer on Earth. A total solar eclipse occurs when the Moon's apparent diameter is larger than the Sun's, blocking all direct sunlight, turning day into darkness. Totality occurs in a narrow path across Earth's surface, with the partial solar eclipse visible over a surrounding region thousands of kilometres wide. Occurring about 1.2 days after perigee (on January 13, 1906, at 2:20 UTC), the Moon's apparent diameter was larger.

Totality was visible from Russian Empire (the parts now belonging to Russia, Kazakhstan, Uzbekistan, Tajikistan and Kyrgyzstan) and China (now northwestern China, Mongolia and northern part of northeastern China). A partial eclipse was visible for most of Asia.

The Camden Morning Post described its path as such:

The shadow track begins on the banks of the Don, in Southern Russia, where the sun rises as totality is ending. It passes over the northern part of the Caspian Sea, where totality begins at sunrise, ant then over the Aral Sea and through Russian Turkestan, Samarkand being the principal town on the shadow track. Then it passes through the Pamirs and into Central Asia, through the desert of Gobi, ending finally on the River Amur, where totality commences at sunset.

== Confusion ==
At the time, "some confusion" existed about the date of the event: "the astronomical day begins at noon, the civil day at midnight, twelve hours earlier. Hence, according to the one system the eclipse will occur on Jan. 13, and according to the other on Jan. 14."

== Observations ==
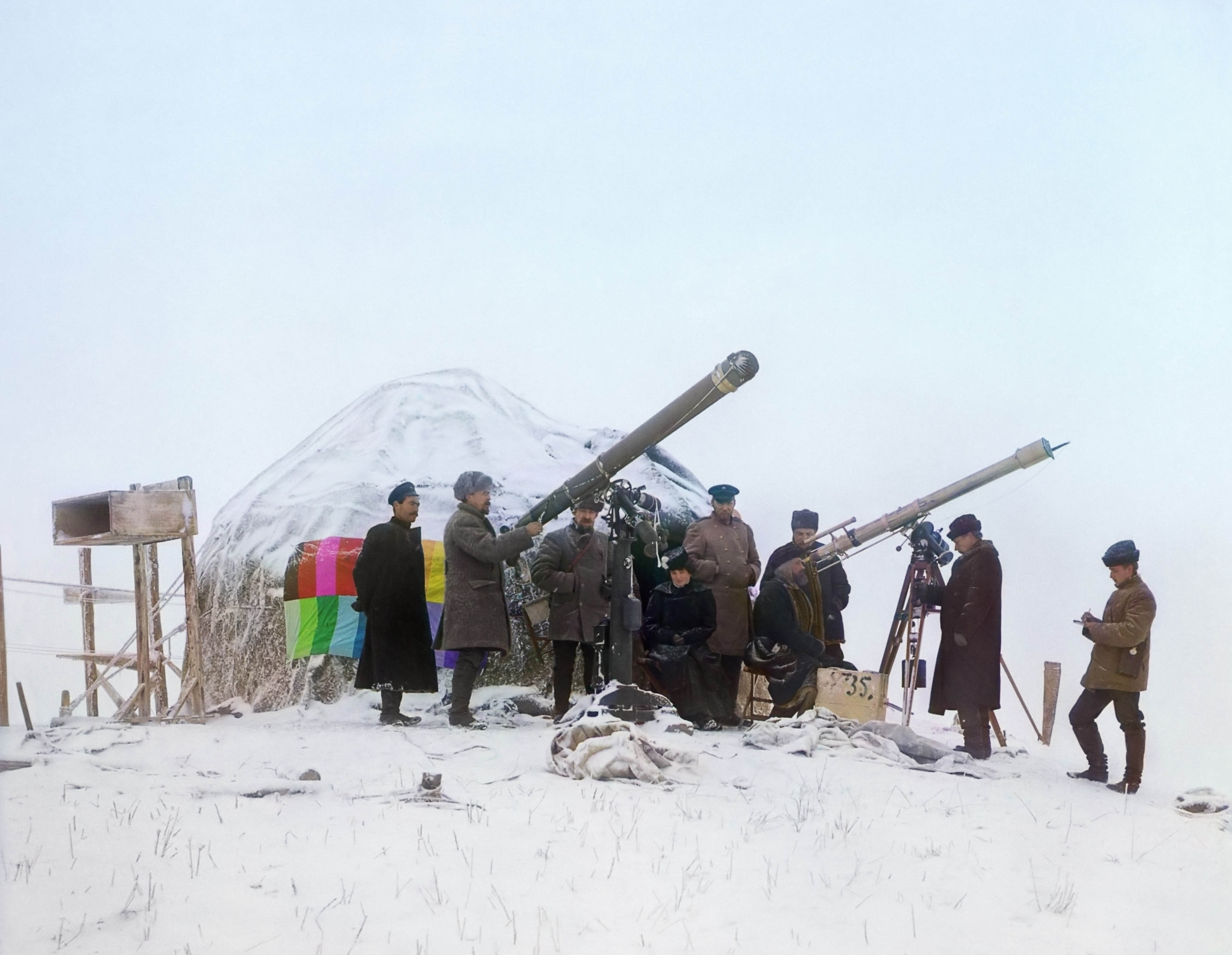
Supervision of a solar eclipse near station Chernjaevo on January 1, 1907. Taken by Sergey Prokudin-Gorsky

The day of the eclipse, it was reported in the Roanoke Times that:

according to the cable dispatches, astronomers, physicists, photographers and scientists of all branches have pitched their camps to take observations. Near the city of Tashkent eminent groups of scientists under the patronage of universities and royal societies of France, Germany, Russia and other countries have set up their instruments with long, unpronouncable names in order to observe the eclipse.

Apart from ground-based observations, the researchers also attempted to perform atmospheric studies with the aid of weather balloons. The Hamburg Observatory sent an expedition to Samarkand, to the south of Tashkent, which was expected to join up with the rest. The expedition from Paris was carried out by the Meudon Observatory, under M. Stefanik, and the British expedition by the British Astronomical Association. According to journalist Mary Proctor, despite the recent construction of railways in the region, an attempt to join one of the expeditions and report on the eclipse from the location of observation had proven fruitless: "The Russian representatives in this country refused to take any responsibility if the writer ventured into Western Turkestan [...] According to information received from the Secretary of State, who lived in China twenty-three years, it would require a month to journey from Peking to Tsair-Osu. The desert of Gobi had to be crossed, and the journey made on horseback, an armed escort being necessary, as this region is also under Russian government."

The Guardian reported that the eclipse was observed by "special scientific expeditions at Samarkand and Tashkent, in Russian Turkestan"; a Reuters correspondent telegraphed from Samarkand that the eclipse had been observed from the railway between the stations of Kuropatkin and Mijulnskaja, as snow fell. Meanwhile, a visit by Afghan amir Habibullah Khan and Lord Kitchener to Agra took place under a "distinct three-quarter eclipse of the sun". On the western edge of the path, the eclipse was observed from Yessentuki.

== Eclipse details ==
Shown below are two tables displaying details about this particular solar eclipse. The first table outlines times at which the Moon's penumbra or umbra attains the specific parameter, and the second table describes various other parameters pertaining to this eclipse.

January 14, 1907 Solar Eclipse Times
Event	Time (UTC)
First Penumbral External Contact	1907 January 14 at 03:52:57.4 UTC
First Umbral External Contact	1907 January 14 at 05:12:27.1 UTC
First Central Line	1907 January 14 at 05:13:31.0 UTC
First Umbral Internal Contact	1907 January 14 at 05:14:35.8 UTC
Ecliptic Conjunction	1907 January 14 at 05:56:57.5 UTC
Greatest Duration	1907 January 14 at 06:04:51.3 UTC
Greatest Eclipse	1907 January 14 at 06:05:43.0 UTC
Equatorial Conjunction	1907 January 14 at 06:12:01.9 UTC
Last Umbral Internal Contact	1907 January 14 at 06:56:47.3 UTC
Last Central Line	1907 January 14 at 06:57:50.7 UTC
Last Umbral External Contact	1907 January 14 at 06:58:53.2 UTC
Last Penumbral External Contact	1907 January 14 at 08:18:28.4 UTC

January 14, 1907 Solar Eclipse Parameters
Parameter	Value
Eclipse Magnitude	1.02812
Eclipse Obscuration	1.05702
Gamma	0.86277
Sun Right Ascension	19h39m03.3s
Sun Declination	-21°29'55.0"
Sun Semi-Diameter	16'15.6"
Sun Equatorial Horizontal Parallax	08.9"
Moon Right Ascension	19h38m47.6s
Moon Declination	-20°37'40.5"
Moon Semi-Diameter	16'34.8"
Moon Equatorial Horizontal Parallax	1°00'50.9"
ΔT	6.2 s

== Eclipse season ==
This eclipse is part of an eclipse season, a period, roughly every six months, when eclipses occur. Only two (or occasionally three) eclipse seasons occur each year, and each season lasts about 35 days and repeats just short of six months (173 days) later; thus two full eclipse seasons always occur each year. Either two or three eclipses happen each eclipse season. In the sequence below, each eclipse is separated by a fortnight.

Eclipse season of January 1907
January 14 Descending node (new moon)	January 29 Ascending node (full moon)
Total solar eclipse Solar Saros 120	Partial lunar eclipse Lunar Saros 132

== Related eclipses ==
=== Eclipses in 1907 ===
- A total solar eclipse on January 14.
- A partial lunar eclipse on January 29.
- An annular solar eclipse on July 10.
- A partial lunar eclipse on July 25.

=== Metonic ===
- Preceded by: Solar eclipse of March 29, 1903
- Followed by: Solar eclipse of November 2, 1910

=== Tzolkinex ===
- Preceded by: Solar eclipse of December 3, 1899
- Followed by: Solar eclipse of February 25, 1914

=== Half-Saros ===
- Preceded by: Lunar eclipse of January 8, 1898
- Followed by: Lunar eclipse of January 20, 1916

=== Tritos ===
- Preceded by: Solar eclipse of February 13, 1896
- Followed by: Solar eclipse of December 14, 1917

=== Solar Saros 120 ===
- Preceded by: Solar eclipse of January 1, 1889
- Followed by: Solar eclipse of January 24, 1925

=== Inex ===
- Preceded by: Solar eclipse of February 2, 1878
- Followed by: Solar eclipse of December 25, 1935

=== Triad ===
- Preceded by: Solar eclipse of March 14, 1820
- Followed by: Solar eclipse of November 13, 1993

=== Solar eclipses of 1906–1909 ===
This eclipse is a member of a semester series. An eclipse in a semester series of solar eclipses repeats approximately every 177 days and 4 hours (a semester) at alternating nodes of the Moon's orbit.

The partial solar eclipses on February 23, 1906 and August 20, 1906 occur in the previous lunar year eclipse set.

Solar eclipse series sets from 1906 to 1909
Ascending node			Descending node		
Saros	Map	Gamma	Saros	Map	Gamma
115	July 21, 1906 Partial	−1.3637	120	January 14, 1907 Total	0.8628
125	July 10, 1907 Annular	−0.6313	130	January 3, 1908 Total	0.1934
135	June 28, 1908 Annular	0.1389	140	December 23, 1908 Hybrid	−0.4985
145	June 17, 1909 Hybrid	0.8957	150	December 12, 1909 Partial	−1.2456

=== Saros 120 ===
This eclipse is a part of Saros series 120, repeating every 18 years, 11 days, and containing 71 events. The series started with a partial solar eclipse on May 27, 933 AD. It contains annular eclipses from August 11, 1059 through April 26, 1492; hybrid eclipses from May 8, 1510 through June 8, 1564; and total eclipses from June 20, 1582 through March 30, 2033. The series ends at member 71 as a partial eclipse on July 7, 2195. Its eclipses are tabulated in three columns; every third eclipse in the same column is one exeligmos apart, so they all cast shadows over approximately the same parts of the Earth.

The longest duration of annularity was produced by member 11 at 6 minutes, 24 seconds on September 11, 1113, and the longest duration of totality was produced by member 60 at 2 minutes, 50 seconds on March 9, 1997. All eclipses in this series occur at the Moon’s descending node of orbit.

Series members 50–71 occur between 1801 and 2195:
50	51	52
November 19, 1816	November 30, 1834	December 11, 1852
53	54	55
December 22, 1870	January 1, 1889	January 14, 1907
56	57	58
January 24, 1925	February 4, 1943	February 15, 1961
59	60	61
February 26, 1979	March 9, 1997	March 20, 2015
62	63	64
March 30, 2033	April 11, 2051	April 21, 2069
65	66	67
May 2, 2087	May 14, 2105	May 25, 2123
68	69	70
June 4, 2141	June 16, 2159	June 26, 2177
71
July 7, 2195

=== Metonic series ===
The metonic series repeats eclipses every 19 years (6939.69 days), lasting about 5 cycles. Eclipses occur in nearly the same calendar date. In addition, the octon subseries repeats 1/5 of that or every 3.8 years (1387.94 days). All eclipses in this table occur at the Moon's descending node.

22 eclipse events between March 27, 1884 and August 20, 1971
March 27–29	January 14	November 1–2	August 20–21	June 8
108	110	112	114	116
March 27, 1884			August 20, 1895	June 8, 1899
118	120	122	124	126
March 29, 1903	January 14, 1907	November 2, 1910	August 21, 1914	June 8, 1918
128	130	132	134	136
March 28, 1922	January 14, 1926	November 1, 1929	August 21, 1933	June 8, 1937
138	140	142	144	146
March 27, 1941	January 14, 1945	November 1, 1948	August 20, 1952	June 8, 1956
148	150	152	154	
March 27, 1960	January 14, 1964	November 2, 1967	August 20, 1971	

=== Tritos series ===
This eclipse is a part of a tritos cycle, repeating at alternating nodes every 135 synodic months (≈ 3986.63 days, or 11 years minus 1 month). Their appearance and longitude are irregular due to a lack of synchronization with the anomalistic month (period of perigee), but groupings of 3 tritos cycles (≈ 33 years minus 3 months) come close (≈ 434.044 anomalistic months), so eclipses are similar in these groupings.

Series members between 1801 and 2200
October 19, 1808 (Saros 111)	September 19, 1819 (Saros 112)	August 18, 1830 (Saros 113)	July 18, 1841 (Saros 114)	June 17, 1852 (Saros 115)
May 17, 1863 (Saros 116)	April 16, 1874 (Saros 117)	March 16, 1885 (Saros 118)	February 13, 1896 (Saros 119)	January 14, 1907 (Saros 120)
December 14, 1917 (Saros 121)	November 12, 1928 (Saros 122)	October 12, 1939 (Saros 123)	September 12, 1950 (Saros 124)	August 11, 1961 (Saros 125)
July 10, 1972 (Saros 126)	June 11, 1983 (Saros 127)	May 10, 1994 (Saros 128)	April 8, 2005 (Saros 129)	March 9, 2016 (Saros 130)
February 6, 2027 (Saros 131)	January 5, 2038 (Saros 132)	December 5, 2048 (Saros 133)	November 5, 2059 (Saros 134)	October 4, 2070 (Saros 135)
September 3, 2081 (Saros 136)	August 3, 2092 (Saros 137)	July 4, 2103 (Saros 138)	June 3, 2114 (Saros 139)	May 3, 2125 (Saros 140)
April 1, 2136 (Saros 141)	March 2, 2147 (Saros 142)	January 30, 2158 (Saros 143)	December 29, 2168 (Saros 144)	November 28, 2179 (Saros 145)
October 29, 2190 (Saros 146)

=== Inex series ===
This eclipse is a part of the long period inex cycle, repeating at alternating nodes, every 358 synodic months (≈ 10,571.95 days, or 29 years minus 20 days). Their appearance and longitude are irregular due to a lack of synchronization with the anomalistic month (period of perigee). However, groupings of 3 inex cycles (≈ 87 years minus 2 months) comes close (≈ 1,151.02 anomalistic months), so eclipses are similar in these groupings.

Series members between 1801 and 2200
March 14, 1820 (Saros 117)	February 23, 1849 (Saros 118)	February 2, 1878 (Saros 119)
January 14, 1907 (Saros 120)	December 25, 1935 (Saros 121)	December 4, 1964 (Saros 122)
November 13, 1993 (Saros 123)	October 25, 2022 (Saros 124)	October 4, 2051 (Saros 125)
September 13, 2080 (Saros 126)	August 26, 2109 (Saros 127)	August 5, 2138 (Saros 128)
July 16, 2167 (Saros 129)	June 26, 2196 (Saros 130)	
