= Solar Saros 120 =

Saros cycle series 120 for solar eclipses

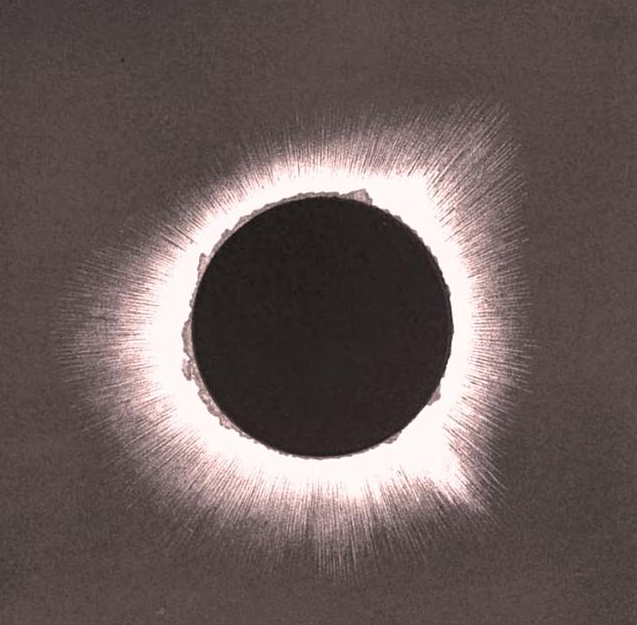
December 22, 1870 Series member 53

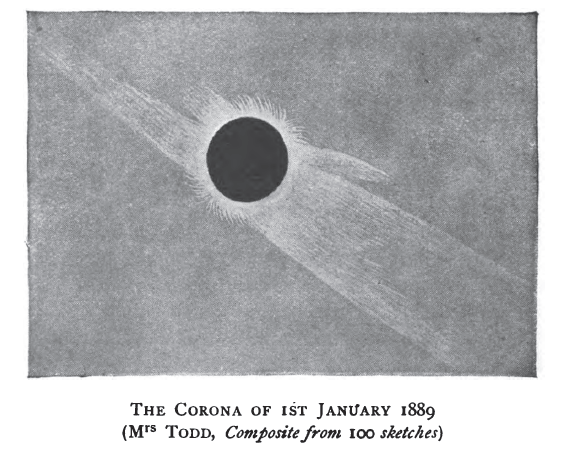
January 1, 1889 Series member 54

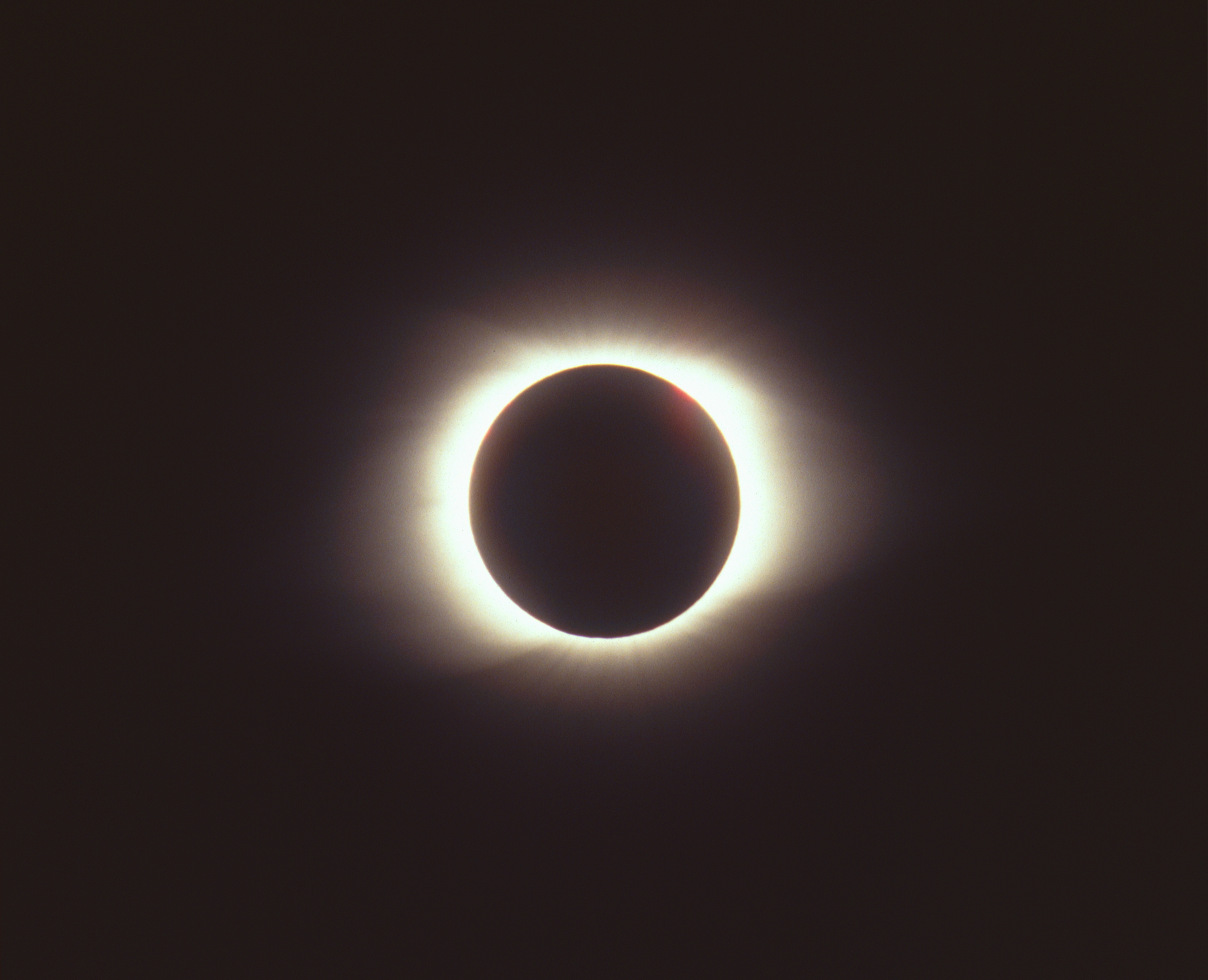
March 9, 1997, Chita, Russia Series member 60

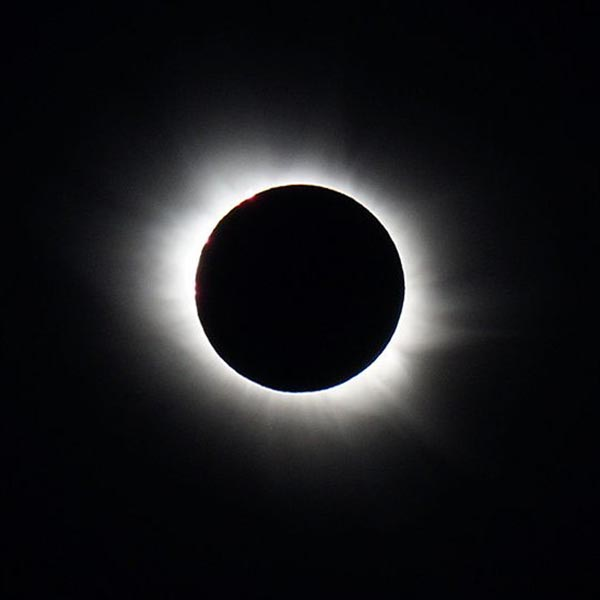
March 20, 2015, Longyearbyen, Norway Series member 61

Historic saros cycle animation

The Saros cycle series 120 for solar eclipses occurs at the Moon's descending node, repeating every 18 years, 11 days, containing 71 eclipses, including 55 umbral eclipses. The series started on 27 May 933 and will end on 7 July 2195. It included 25 annular eclipses between 1059 and 1492, followed by 4 hybrid eclipses between 1510 and 1564, and is currently in a period of 26 total eclipses until 2033. The most recent eclipse was a total eclipse on 20 March 2015 and the next will be a total eclipse on 30 March 2033 (which will also be the last total eclipse of the series). The longest duration of totality was 2 minutes, 50 seconds on 9 March 1997 and the longest annular eclipse was 6 minutes 24 seconds on 11 September 1113.

== Umbral eclipses ==
Umbral eclipses (annular, total and hybrid) can be further classified as either: 1) Central (two limits), 2) Central (one limit) or 3) Non-Central (one limit). The statistical distribution of these classes in Saros series 120 appears in the following table.

Classification	Number	Percent
All Umbral eclipses	55	100.00%
Central (two limits)	55	100.00%
Central (one limit)	0	0.00%
Non-central (one limit)	0	0.00%

== All eclipses ==
Note: Dates are given in the Julian calendar prior to 15 October 1582, and in the Gregorian calendar after that.

Saros	Member	Date	Time (Greatest) UTC	Type	Location Lat, Long	Gamma	Mag.	Width (km)	Duration (min:sec)	Ref
120	1	May 27, 933	4:10:41	Partial	67.7S 132.3E	-1.5258	0.063			
120	2	June 7, 951	10:33:36	Partial	66.7S 25.1E	-1.4414	0.2073			
120	3	June 17, 969	16:54:26	Partial	65.7S 81W	-1.3547	0.3558			
120	4	June 28, 987	23:17:31	Partial	64.8S 172.8E	-1.269	0.5024			
120	5	July 9, 1005	5:42:18	Partial	63.9S 66.5E	-1.1837	0.6481			
120	6	July 20, 1023	12:11:29	Partial	63S 40.6W	-1.1015	0.7883			
120	7	July 30, 1041	18:45:44	Partial	62.3S 148.7W	-1.0226	0.9223			
120	8	August 11, 1059	1:27:30	Annular	49.9S 125.8E	-0.9493	0.9337	775	6m 10s	
120	9	August 21, 1077	8:17:11	Annular	43.9S 27E	-0.8817	0.9344	502	6m 21s	
120	10	September 1, 1095	15:14:39	Annular	41.2S 76W	-0.8197	0.9343	414	6m 24s	
120	11	September 11, 1113	22:22:41	Annular	40.5S 177.7E	-0.7658	0.9336	373	6m 24s	
120	12	September 23, 1131	5:39:54	Annular	41.2S 68.9E	-0.7188	0.9328	351	6m 24s	
120	13	October 3, 1149	13:08:11	Annular	43S 42.7W	-0.6802	0.932	339	6m 24s	
120	14	October 14, 1167	20:44:41	Annular	45.4S 156W	-0.6477	0.9313	332	6m 24s	
120	15	October 25, 1185	4:31:56	Annular	48.4S 88.5E	-0.6233	0.9308	328	6m 24s	
120	16	November 5, 1203	12:25:54	Annular	51.4S 27.9W	-0.6037	0.9307	323	6m 23s	
120	17	November 15, 1221	20:27:28	Annular	54.2S 145W	-0.59	0.931	319	6m 20s	
120	18	November 27, 1239	4:33:35	Annular	56.5S 98.1E	-0.5795	0.9318	313	6m 16s	
120	19	December 7, 1257	12:44:36	Annular	57.9S 18.9W	-0.5725	0.9332	305	6m 9s	
120	20	December 18, 1275	20:56:34	Annular	58S 135.5W	-0.5657	0.9352	294	6m 0s	
120	21	December 29, 1293	5:09:12	Annular	56.8S 107.6E	-0.5588	0.9379	279	5m 48s	
120	22	January 9, 1312	13:20:03	Annular	54.3S 10.2W	-0.55	0.9413	261	5m 33s	
120	23	January 19, 1330	21:28:48	Annular	50.6S 129W	-0.5391	0.9452	240	5m 16s	
120	24	January 31, 1348	5:31:34	Annular	46S 111.9E	-0.5226	0.9499	216	4m 55s	
120	25	February 10, 1366	13:29:55	Annular	40.6S 7.4W	-0.5016	0.9549	190	4m 32s	
120	26	February 21, 1384	21:20:45	Annular	34.6S 126W	-0.4738	0.9605	162	4m 5s	
120	27	March 4, 1402	5:06:39	Annular	28.2S 115.9E	-0.441	0.9665	134	3m 34s	
120	28	March 14, 1420	12:42:57	Annular	21.4S 0.3W	-0.3994	0.9727	106	2m 59s	
120	29	March 25, 1438	20:14:23	Annular	14.5S 115.5W	-0.3529	0.979	80	2m 21s	
120	30	April 5, 1456	3:37:14	Annular	7.3S 131.5E	-0.298	0.9853	54	1m 40s	
120	31	April 16, 1474	10:55:48	Annular	0.2S 19.7E	-0.2387	0.9916	30	0m 58s	
120	32	April 26, 1492	18:07:10	Annular	6.8N 90W	-0.1723	0.9976	8	0m 16s	
120	33	May 8, 1510	1:16:15	Hybrid	13.5N 161.4E	-0.103	1.0033	12	0m 22s	
120	34	May 18, 1528	8:21:05	Hybrid	19.9N 54.6E	-0.029	1.0085	29	0m 56s	
120	35	May 29, 1546	15:24:40	Hybrid	25.7N 51W	0.047	1.0133	46	1m 24s	
120	36	June 8, 1564	22:26:49	Hybrid	30.8N 155.4W	0.1253	1.0174	60	1m 44s	
120	37	June 20, 1582	5:30:27	Total	35N 100.8E	0.2032	1.021	73	1m 59s	
120	38	July 10, 1600	12:35:58	Total	38.2N 2.7W	0.2804	1.0238	84	2m 8s	
120	39	July 21, 1618	19:44:30	Total	40.4N 106.3W	0.3558	1.026	94	2m 13s	
120	40	August 1, 1636	2:58:15	Total	41.5N 148.9E	0.4279	1.0275	103	2m 15s	
120	41	August 12, 1654	10:17:43	Total	41.7N 42.5E	0.4962	1.0285	110	2m 16s	
120	42	August 22, 1672	17:44:06	Total	41.2N 66.2W	0.5594	1.0288	117	2m 15s	
120	43	September 3, 1690	1:17:47	Total	40.3N 177.4W	0.6173	1.0287	122	2m 13s	
120	44	September 14, 1708	9:00:22	Total	39.2N 68.3E	0.6685	1.0281	126	2m 10s	
120	45	September 25, 1726	16:51:45	Total	38N 49W	0.7134	1.0273	129	2m 7s	
120	46	October 6, 1744	0:51:24	Total	37N 169.1W	0.7521	1.0263	132	2m 4s	
120	47	October 17, 1762	9:00:34	Total	36.2N 67.6E	0.7836	1.0253	135	2m 2s	
120	48	October 27, 1780	17:18:27	Total	35.6N 58.6W	0.8083	1.0244	138	2m 0s	
120	49	November 8, 1798	1:44:39	Total	35.1N 172.5E	0.827	1.0237	141	1m 59s	
120	50	November 19, 1816	10:17:23	Total	35N 41.5E	0.8408	1.0233	144	2m 0s	
120	51	November 30, 1834	18:56:35	Total	34.9N 91.6W	0.8498	1.0233	150	2m 2s	
120	52	December 11, 1852	3:40:44	Total	35.2N 133.9E	0.8551	1.0237	156	2m 5s	
120	53	December 22, 1870	12:27:33	Total	35.7N 1.5W	0.8585	1.0248	165	2m 11s	
120	54	January 1, 1889	21:16:50	Total	36.7N 137.6W	0.8603	1.0262	175	2m 17s	
120	55	January 14, 1907	6:05:43	Total	38.3N 86.4E	0.8628	1.0281	189	2m 25s	
120	56	January 24, 1925	14:54:03	Total	40.5N 49.6W	0.8661	1.0304	206	2m 32s	
120	57	February 4, 1943	23:38:10	Total	43.6N 175.1E	0.8734	1.0331	229	2m 39s	
120	58	February 15, 1961	8:19:48	Total	47.4N 40E	0.883	1.036	258	2m 45s	
120	59	February 26, 1979	16:55:06	Total	52.1N 94.5W	0.8981	1.0391	298	2m 49s	
120	60	March 9, 1997	1:24:51	Total	57.8N 130.7E	0.9183	1.042	356	2m 50s	
120	61	March 20, 2015	9:46:47	Total	64.4N 6.6W	0.9454	1.0445	463	2m 47s	
120	62	March 30, 2033	18:02:36	Total	71.3N 155.8W	0.9778	1.0462	781	2m 37s	
120	63	April 11, 2051	2:10:39	Partial	71.6N 32.2E	1.0169	0.9849			
120	64	April 21, 2069	10:11:09	Partial	71N 101.3W	1.0624	0.8992			
120	65	May 2, 2087	18:04:42	Partial	70.3N 127.6E	1.1139	0.8011			
120	66	May 14, 2105	1:52:06	Partial	69.4N 1.4W	1.1708	0.6921			
120	67	May 25, 2123	9:33:27	Partial	68.5N 128.2W	1.2325	0.5729			
120	68	June 4, 2141	17:09:59	Partial	67.5N 106.7E	1.2981	0.4458			
120	69	June 16, 2159	0:42:44	Partial	66.5N 17W	1.3668	0.3124			
120	70	June 26, 2177	8:13:28	Partial	65.5N 139.8W	1.4371	0.1758			
120	71	July 7, 2195	15:41:21	Partial	64.6N 98.5E	1.5095	0.0353			
