= Solar eclipse of November 13, 1993 =

20th-century partial solar eclipse

- Partial eclipse
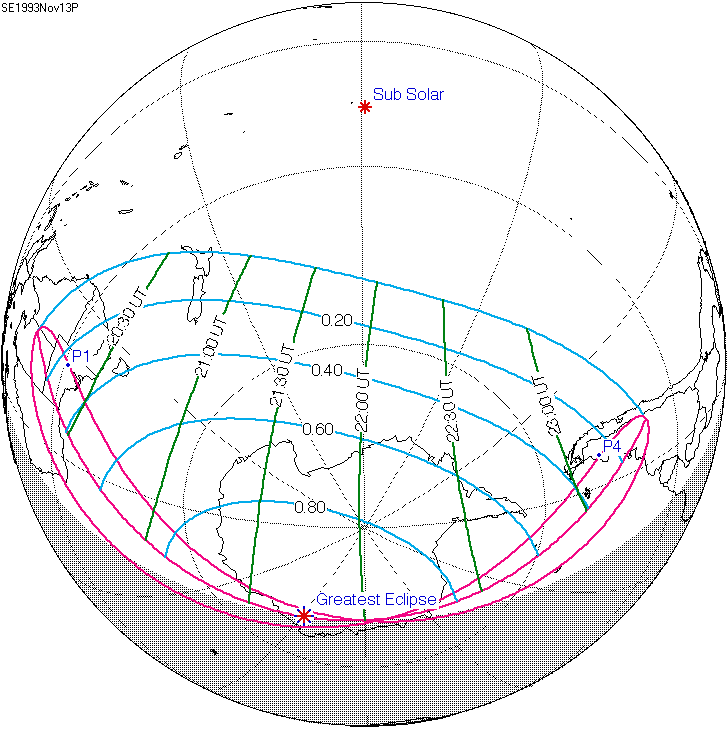
- Map
- Gamma: −1.0411
- Magnitude: 0.928

Maximum eclipse
- Coordinates: 69.6°S 58.3°E

Times (UTC)
- Greatest eclipse: 21:45:51

References
- Saros: 123 (52 of 70)
- Catalog # (SE5000): 9494

A partial solar eclipse occurred at the Moon's ascending node of orbit between Saturday, November 13 and Sunday, November 14, 1993, with a magnitude of 0.928. A solar eclipse occurs when the Moon passes between Earth and the Sun, thereby totally or partly obscuring the image of the Sun for a viewer on Earth. A partial solar eclipse occurs in the polar regions of the Earth when the center of the Moon's shadow misses the Earth.

A partial eclipse was visible at sunrise over parts of Australia on November 14 (Sunday), continued over New Zealand and Antarctica, and ended at sunset over the southern tip of South America on November 13 (Saturday).

== Eclipse timing ==
=== Places experiencing partial eclipse ===
Solar Eclipse of November 13, 1993 (Local Times)
Country or territory	City or place	Start of partial eclipse	Maximum eclipse	End of partial eclipse	Duration of eclipse (hr:min)	Maximum coverage
Australia	Brisbane (Note: The times listed for this location occur on November 14, 1993, local time.)	05:58:55	06:13:54	06:29:17	0:30	0.79%
Australia	Alice Springs	05:41:55 (sunrise)	05:44:27	06:08:23	0:26	5.00%
Australia	Tennant Creek	05:47:00 (sunrise)	05:48:45	05:50:21	0:03	0.06%
Australia	Lord Howe Island	07:00:01	07:20:43	07:42:08	0:42	1.84%
Australia	Sydney	06:49:55	07:23:01	07:57:56	1:08	9.74%
Australia	Wollongong	06:49:42	07:23:51	07:59:55	1:10	10.84%
Australia	Eucla	05:02:58 (sunrise)	05:09:38	05:48:20	0:45	21.71%
Australia	Canberra	06:48:56	07:25:04	08:03:20	1:14	13.54%
Australia	Adelaide	06:17:04	06:55:35	07:36:22	1:19	20.94%
Australia	Melbourne	06:48:40	07:28:56	08:11:43	1:23	21.14%
Australia	Hobart	06:52:29	07:37:01	08:24:31	1:32	28.04%
New Zealand	Auckland	09:34:05	09:38:21	09:42:39	0:09	0.01%
New Zealand	Tauranga	09:34:32	09:41:09	09:47:50	0:13	0.03%
New Zealand	Wellington	09:17:11	09:46:30	10:17:10	1:00	3.70%
New Zealand	Christchurch	09:12:03	09:48:49	10:27:36	1:16	8.12%
New Zealand	Oban	09:07:26	09:51:42	10:38:45	1:31	17.00%
New Zealand	Chatham Islands	10:19:36	10:45:52	11:13:02	0:53	2.15%
Australia	Perth	05:09:33 (sunrise)	05:10:39	05:11:44	0:02	0.27%
Antarctica	Casey Station	04:28:31	05:20:05	06:13:32	1:45	81.09%
Antarctica	Davis Station	03:44:59	04:34:35	05:25:13	1:40	90.18%
Antarctica	Marambio Base	18:55:06	19:44:33	20:32:14	1:37	49.16%
Antarctica	Orcadas Base	18:58:11	19:45:38	20:15:42 (sunset)	1:18	50.51%
Antarctica	Esperanza Base	18:56:47	19:45:51	20:33:08	1:36	47.62%
Antarctica	Carlini Base	18:59:23	19:47:54	20:34:35	1:35	44.80%
Argentina	Ushuaia	19:17:17	20:00:22	20:41:36	1:24	25.87%
Falkland Islands	Stanley	19:20:27	20:01:42	20:20:14 (sunset)	1:00	26.75%
Chile	Punta Arenas	19:21:55	20:03:03	20:42:24	1:20	21.27%
Argentina	Rawson	19:45:10	20:14:00	20:21:55 (sunset)	0:37	7.79%
Argentina	Neuquén	20:04:29	20:19:40	20:22:50 (sunset)	0:18	1.06%

== Eclipse details ==
Shown below are two tables displaying details about this particular solar eclipse. The first table outlines times at which the Moon's penumbra or umbra attains the specific parameter, and the second table describes various other parameters pertaining to this eclipse.

November 13, 1993 Solar Eclipse Times
Event	Time (UTC)
First Penumbral External Contact	1993 November 13 at 19:47:23.8 UTC
Ecliptic Conjunction	1993 November 13 at 21:35:20.3 UTC
Greatest Eclipse	1993 November 13 at 21:45:51.1 UTC
Equatorial Conjunction	1993 November 13 at 22:04:10.6 UTC
Last Penumbral External Contact	1993 November 13 at 23:44:13.2 UTC

November 13, 1993 Solar Eclipse Parameters
Parameter	Value
Eclipse Magnitude	0.92801
Eclipse Obscuration	0.91428
Gamma	−1.04114
Sun Right Ascension	15h16m26.8s
Sun Declination	-18°08'48.1"
Sun Semi-Diameter	16'09.9"
Sun Equatorial Horizontal Parallax	08.9"
Moon Right Ascension	15h15m42.5s
Moon Declination	-19°10'51.4"
Moon Semi-Diameter	16'30.7"
Moon Equatorial Horizontal Parallax	1°00'35.8"
ΔT	59.9 s

== Eclipse season ==
This eclipse is part of an eclipse season, a period, roughly every six months, when eclipses occur. Only two (or occasionally three) eclipse seasons occur each year, and each season lasts about 35 days and repeats just short of six months (173 days) later; thus two full eclipse seasons always occur each year. Either two or three eclipses happen each eclipse season. In the sequence below, each eclipse is separated by a fortnight.

Eclipse season of November 1993
November 13 Ascending node (new moon)	November 29 Descending node (full moon)
Partial solar eclipse Solar Saros 123	Total lunar eclipse Lunar Saros 135

== Related eclipses ==
=== Eclipses in 1993 ===
- A partial solar eclipse on May 21.
- A total lunar eclipse on June 4.
- A partial solar eclipse on November 13.
- A total lunar eclipse on November 29.

=== Metonic ===
- Preceded by: Solar eclipse of January 26, 1990
- Followed by: Solar eclipse of September 2, 1997

=== Tzolkinex ===
- Preceded by: Solar eclipse of October 3, 1986
- Followed by: Solar eclipse of December 25, 2000

=== Half-Saros ===
- Preceded by: Lunar eclipse of November 8, 1984
- Followed by: Lunar eclipse of November 20, 2002

=== Tritos ===
- Preceded by: Solar eclipse of December 15, 1982
- Followed by: Solar eclipse of October 14, 2004

=== Solar Saros 123 ===
- Preceded by: Solar eclipse of November 3, 1975
- Followed by: Solar eclipse of November 25, 2011

=== Inex ===
- Preceded by: Solar eclipse of December 4, 1964
- Followed by: Solar eclipse of October 25, 2022

=== Triad ===
- Preceded by: Solar eclipse of January 14, 1907
- Followed by: Solar eclipse of September 13, 2080

=== Solar eclipses of 1993–1996 ===
This eclipse is a member of a semester series. An eclipse in a semester series of solar eclipses repeats approximately every 177 days and 4 hours (a semester) at alternating nodes of the Moon's orbit.

Solar eclipse series sets from 1993 to 1996
Descending node			Ascending node		
Saros	Map	Gamma	Saros	Map	Gamma
118	May 21, 1993 Partial	1.1372	123	November 13, 1993 Partial	−1.0411
128 Partial in Bismarck, ND, USA	May 10, 1994 Annular	0.4077	133 Totality in Bolivia	November 3, 1994 Total	−0.3522
138	April 29, 1995 Annular	−0.3382	143 Totality in Dundlod, India	October 24, 1995 Total	0.3518
148	April 17, 1996 Partial	−1.058	153	October 12, 1996 Partial	1.1227

=== Saros 123 ===
This eclipse is a part of Saros series 123, repeating every 18 years, 11 days, and containing 70 events. The series started with a partial solar eclipse on April 29, 1074. It contains annular eclipses from July 2, 1182 through April 19, 1651; hybrid eclipses from April 30, 1669 through May 22, 1705; and total eclipses from June 3, 1723 through October 23, 1957. The series ends at member 70 as a partial eclipse on May 31, 2318. Its eclipses are tabulated in three columns; every third eclipse in the same column is one exeligmos apart, so they all cast shadows over approximately the same parts of the Earth.

The longest duration of annularity was produced by member 19 at 8 minutes, 7 seconds on November 9, 1398, and the longest duration of totality was produced by member 42 at 3 minutes, 27 seconds on July 27, 1813. All eclipses in this series occur at the Moon’s ascending node of orbit.

Series members 42–63 occur between 1801 and 2200:
42	43	44
July 27, 1813	August 7, 1831	August 18, 1849
45	46	47
August 29, 1867	September 8, 1885	September 21, 1903
48	49	50
October 1, 1921	October 12, 1939	October 23, 1957
51	52	53
November 3, 1975	November 13, 1993	November 25, 2011
54	55	56
December 5, 2029	December 16, 2047	December 27, 2065
57	58	59
January 7, 2084	January 19, 2102	January 30, 2120
60	61	62
February 9, 2138	February 21, 2156	March 3, 2174
63
March 13, 2192

=== Metonic series ===
The metonic series repeats eclipses every 19 years (6939.69 days), lasting about 5 cycles. Eclipses occur in nearly the same calendar date. In addition, the octon subseries repeats 1/5 of that or every 3.8 years (1387.94 days). All eclipses in this table occur at the Moon's ascending node.

21 eclipse events between June 21, 1982 and June 21, 2058
June 21	April 8–9	January 26	November 13–14	September 1–2
117	119	121	123	125
June 21, 1982	April 9, 1986	January 26, 1990	November 13, 1993	September 2, 1997
127	129	131	133	135
June 21, 2001	April 8, 2005	January 26, 2009	November 13, 2012	September 1, 2016
137	139	141	143	145
June 21, 2020	April 8, 2024	January 26, 2028	November 14, 2031	September 2, 2035
147	149	151	153	155
June 21, 2039	April 9, 2043	January 26, 2047	November 14, 2050	September 2, 2054
157
June 21, 2058

=== Tritos series ===
This eclipse is a part of a tritos cycle, repeating at alternating nodes every 135 synodic months (≈ 3986.63 days, or 11 years minus 1 month). Their appearance and longitude are irregular due to a lack of synchronization with the anomalistic month (period of perigee), but groupings of 3 tritos cycles (≈ 33 years minus 3 months) come close (≈ 434.044 anomalistic months), so eclipses are similar in these groupings.

Series members between 1801 and 2200
March 25, 1819 (Saros 107)	February 23, 1830 (Saros 108)	January 22, 1841 (Saros 109)		November 21, 1862 (Saros 111)
		August 20, 1895 (Saros 114)	July 21, 1906 (Saros 115)	June 19, 1917 (Saros 116)
May 19, 1928 (Saros 117)	April 19, 1939 (Saros 118)	March 18, 1950 (Saros 119)	February 15, 1961 (Saros 120)	January 16, 1972 (Saros 121)
December 15, 1982 (Saros 122)	November 13, 1993 (Saros 123)	October 14, 2004 (Saros 124)	September 13, 2015 (Saros 125)	August 12, 2026 (Saros 126)
July 13, 2037 (Saros 127)	June 11, 2048 (Saros 128)	May 11, 2059 (Saros 129)	April 11, 2070 (Saros 130)	March 10, 2081 (Saros 131)
February 7, 2092 (Saros 132)	January 8, 2103 (Saros 133)	December 8, 2113 (Saros 134)	November 6, 2124 (Saros 135)	October 7, 2135 (Saros 136)
September 6, 2146 (Saros 137)	August 5, 2157 (Saros 138)	July 5, 2168 (Saros 139)	June 5, 2179 (Saros 140)	May 4, 2190 (Saros 141)

=== Inex series ===
This eclipse is a part of the long period inex cycle, repeating at alternating nodes, every 358 synodic months (≈ 10,571.95 days, or 29 years minus 20 days). Their appearance and longitude are irregular due to a lack of synchronization with the anomalistic month (period of perigee). However, groupings of 3 inex cycles (≈ 87 years minus 2 months) comes close (≈ 1,151.02 anomalistic months), so eclipses are similar in these groupings.

Series members between 1801 and 2200
March 14, 1820 (Saros 117)	February 23, 1849 (Saros 118)	February 2, 1878 (Saros 119)
January 14, 1907 (Saros 120)	December 25, 1935 (Saros 121)	December 4, 1964 (Saros 122)
November 13, 1993 (Saros 123)	October 25, 2022 (Saros 124)	October 4, 2051 (Saros 125)
September 13, 2080 (Saros 126)	August 26, 2109 (Saros 127)	August 5, 2138 (Saros 128)
July 16, 2167 (Saros 129)	June 26, 2196 (Saros 130)	
