= Solar eclipse of May 20, 1947 =

Total eclipse

- Total eclipse
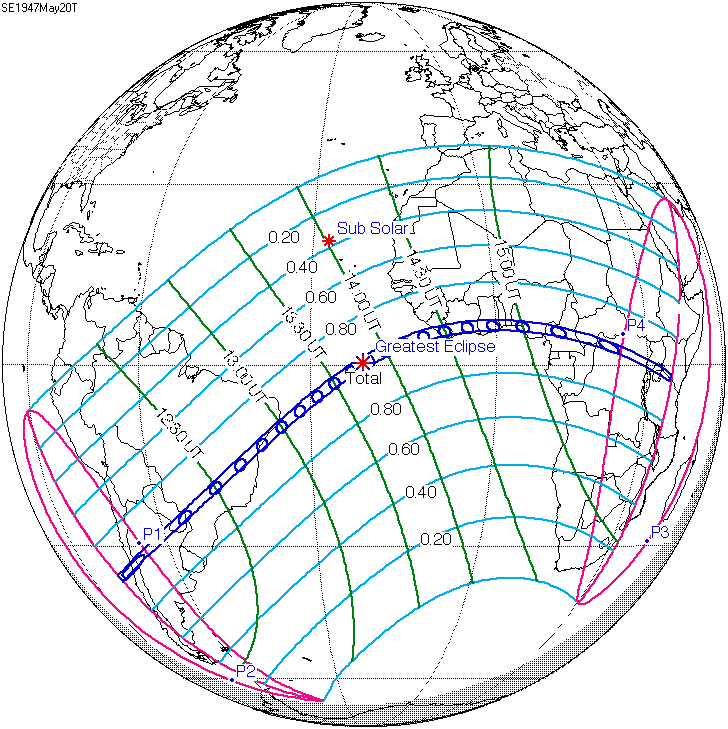
- Map
- Gamma: −0.3528
- Magnitude: 1.0557

Maximum eclipse
- Duration: 313 s (5 min 13 s)
- Coordinates: 0.2°N 21.4°W
- Max. width of band: 196 km (122 mi)

Times (UTC)
- Greatest eclipse: 13:47:47

References
- Saros: 127 (54 of 82)
- Catalog # (SE5000): 9392

A total solar eclipse occurred at the Moon's ascending node of orbit on Tuesday, May 20, 1947, with a magnitude of 1.0557. A solar eclipse occurs when the Moon passes between Earth and the Sun, thereby totally or partly obscuring the image of the Sun for a viewer on Earth. A total solar eclipse occurs when the Moon's apparent diameter is larger than the Sun's, blocking all direct sunlight, turning day into darkness. Totality occurs in a narrow path across Earth's surface, with the partial solar eclipse visible over a surrounding region thousands of kilometres wide. Occurring about 1.8 days before perigee (on May 22, 1947, at 9:10 UTC), the Moon's apparent diameter was larger.

Totality was visible from Chile including the capital city Santiago, Argentina, Paraguay, Brazil, Liberia, French West Africa (the parts now belonging to Ivory Coast and Benin), British Gold Coast (today's Ghana) including capital Accra, French Togoland (today's Togo) including capital Lomé, British Nigeria (today's Nigeria) including capital Lagos, French Cameroons (now belonging to Cameroon), French Equatorial Africa (the parts now belonging to Central African Republic and R. Congo), Belgian Congo (today's DR Congo), British Uganda (today's Uganda), British Tanganyika (now belonging to Tanzania), and British Kenya (today's Kenya). The southern part of Aconcagua, the highest mountain outside Asia, and Iguazu Falls, one of the largest waterfalls systems in the world, lay in the path of totality. A partial eclipse was visible for most of South America and Africa.

== Observations ==
The Royal Astronomical Society of Canada sent a team to Araxa, Brazil. On the morning of the eclipse day, the sky was covered with clouds. Although a slight part of sunlight was seen through the gaps in the clouds around the first contact (the beginning of the partial phase), the weather did not improve after that. The eclipse ended at noon, and the sky began to clear up in the afternoon. The team documented changes in winds and luminance of the sky. Australian radio astronomers originally planned to go to Brazil to make radio observations to promote the development of radio astronomy in Australia. However, the shipping of the equipments could only be made via London at that time, and it was not made before the eclipse in the end, so the plan was not successful. Another team from the Soviet Union successfully made radio observations in Brazil.

A U.S. expedition was sent under the leadership of Lyman J. Briggs. It was sponsored by the National Geographic Society and the U.S. Army Air Force. The base camp was set up on a plateau around 400 miles north of Rio de Janeiro.

== Eclipse details ==
Shown below are two tables displaying details about this particular solar eclipse. The first table outlines times at which the Moon's penumbra or umbra attains the specific parameter, and the second table describes various other parameters pertaining to this eclipse.

May 20, 1947 Solar Eclipse Times
Event	Time (UTC)
First Penumbral External Contact	1947 May 20 at 11:11:14.5 UTC
First Umbral External Contact	1947 May 20 at 12:08:46.7 UTC
First Central Line	1947 May 20 at 12:09:53.9 UTC
First Umbral Internal Contact	1947 May 20 at 12:11:01.1 UTC
First Penumbral Internal Contact	1947 May 20 at 13:16:38.2 UTC
Equatorial Conjunction	1947 May 20 at 13:35:31.5 UTC
Ecliptic Conjunction	1947 May 20 at 13:44:07.5 UTC
Greatest Eclipse	1947 May 20 at 13:47:47.0 UTC
Greatest Duration	1947 May 20 at 13:54:23.9 UTC
Last Penumbral Internal Contact	1947 May 20 at 14:19:13.8 UTC
Last Umbral Internal Contact	1947 May 20 at 15:24:38.7 UTC
Last Central Line	1947 May 20 at 15:25:47.7 UTC
Last Umbral External Contact	1947 May 20 at 15:26:56.7 UTC
Last Penumbral External Contact	1947 May 20 at 16:24:20.8 UTC

May 20, 1947 Solar Eclipse Parameters
Parameter	Value
Eclipse Magnitude	1.05567
Eclipse Obscuration	1.11445
Gamma	−0.35279
Sun Right Ascension	03h45m52.5s
Sun Declination	+19°52'36.9"
Sun Semi-Diameter	15'48.2"
Sun Equatorial Horizontal Parallax	08.7"
Moon Right Ascension	03h46m20.8s
Moon Declination	+19°32'28.8"
Moon Semi-Diameter	16'25.3"
Moon Equatorial Horizontal Parallax	1°00'16.3"
ΔT	28.0 s

== Eclipse season ==
This eclipse is part of an eclipse season, a period, roughly every six months, when eclipses occur. Only two (or occasionally three) eclipse seasons occur each year, and each season lasts about 35 days and repeats just short of six months (173 days) later; thus two full eclipse seasons always occur each year. Either two or three eclipses happen each eclipse season. In the sequence below, each eclipse is separated by a fortnight.

Eclipse season of May–June 1947
May 20 Ascending node (new moon)	June 3 Descending node (full moon)
Total solar eclipse Solar Saros 127	Partial lunar eclipse Lunar Saros 139

== Related eclipses ==
=== Eclipses in 1947 ===
- A total solar eclipse on May 20.
- A partial lunar eclipse on June 3.
- An annular solar eclipse on November 12.
- A penumbral lunar eclipse on November 28.

=== Metonic ===
- Preceded by: Solar eclipse of August 1, 1943
- Followed by: Solar eclipse of March 7, 1951

=== Tzolkinex ===
- Preceded by: Solar eclipse of April 7, 1940
- Followed by: Solar eclipse of June 30, 1954

=== Half-Saros ===
- Preceded by: Lunar eclipse of May 14, 1938
- Followed by: Lunar eclipse of May 24, 1956

=== Tritos ===
- Preceded by: Solar eclipse of June 19, 1936
- Followed by: Solar eclipse of April 19, 1958

=== Solar Saros 127 ===
- Preceded by: Solar eclipse of May 9, 1929
- Followed by: Solar eclipse of May 30, 1965

=== Inex ===
- Preceded by: Solar eclipse of June 8, 1918
- Followed by: Solar eclipse of April 29, 1976

=== Triad ===
- Preceded by: Solar eclipse of July 18, 1860
- Followed by: Solar eclipse of March 20, 2034

=== Solar eclipses of 1946–1949 ===
This eclipse is a member of a semester series. An eclipse in a semester series of solar eclipses repeats approximately every 177 days and 4 hours (a semester) at alternating nodes of the Moon's orbit.

The partial solar eclipses on January 3, 1946 and June 29, 1946 occur in the previous lunar year eclipse set.

Solar eclipse series sets from 1946 to 1949
Ascending node			Descending node		
Saros	Map	Gamma	Saros	Map	Gamma
117	May 30, 1946 Partial	−1.0711	122	November 23, 1946 Partial	1.105
127	May 20, 1947 Total	−0.3528	132	November 12, 1947 Annular	0.3743
137	May 9, 1948 Annular	0.4133	142	November 1, 1948 Total	−0.3517
147	April 28, 1949 Partial	1.2068	152	October 21, 1949 Partial	−1.027

=== Saros 127 ===
This eclipse is a part of Saros series 127, repeating every 18 years, 11 days, and containing 82 events. The series started with a partial solar eclipse on October 10, 991 AD. It contains total eclipses from May 14, 1352 through August 15, 2091. There are no annular or hybrid eclipses in this set. The series ends at member 82 as a partial eclipse on March 21, 2452. Its eclipses are tabulated in three columns; every third eclipse in the same column is one exeligmos apart, so they all cast shadows over approximately the same parts of the Earth.

The longest duration of totality was produced by member 31 at 5 minutes, 40 seconds on August 30, 1532. All eclipses in this series occur at the Moon’s ascending node of orbit.

Series members 46–68 occur between 1801 and 2200:
46	47	48
February 21, 1803	March 4, 1821	March 15, 1839
49	50	51
March 25, 1857	April 6, 1875	April 16, 1893
52	53	54
April 28, 1911	May 9, 1929	May 20, 1947
55	56	57
May 30, 1965	June 11, 1983	June 21, 2001
58	59	60
July 2, 2019	July 13, 2037	July 24, 2055
61	62	63
August 3, 2073	August 15, 2091	August 26, 2109
64	65	66
September 6, 2127	September 16, 2145	September 28, 2163
67	68	
October 8, 2181	October 19, 2199	

=== Metonic series ===
The metonic series repeats eclipses every 19 years (6939.69 days), lasting about 5 cycles. Eclipses occur in nearly the same calendar date. In addition, the octon subseries repeats 1/5 of that or every 3.8 years (1387.94 days). All eclipses in this table occur at the Moon's ascending node.

22 eclipse events between December 24, 1916 and July 31, 2000
December 24–25	October 12	July 31–August 1	May 19–20	March 7
111	113	115	117	119
December 24, 1916		July 31, 1924	May 19, 1928	March 7, 1932
121	123	125	127	129
December 25, 1935	October 12, 1939	August 1, 1943	May 20, 1947	March 7, 1951
131	133	135	137	139
December 25, 1954	October 12, 1958	July 31, 1962	May 20, 1966	March 7, 1970
141	143	145	147	149
December 24, 1973	October 12, 1977	July 31, 1981	May 19, 1985	March 7, 1989
151	153	155		
December 24, 1992	October 12, 1996	July 31, 2000		

=== Tritos series ===
This eclipse is a part of a tritos cycle, repeating at alternating nodes every 135 synodic months (≈ 3986.63 days, or 11 years minus 1 month). Their appearance and longitude are irregular due to a lack of synchronization with the anomalistic month (period of perigee), but groupings of 3 tritos cycles (≈ 33 years minus 3 months) come close (≈ 434.044 anomalistic months), so eclipses are similar in these groupings.

Series members between 1801 and 2200
June 26, 1805 (Saros 114)	May 27, 1816 (Saros 115)	April 26, 1827 (Saros 116)	March 25, 1838 (Saros 117)	February 23, 1849 (Saros 118)
January 23, 1860 (Saros 119)	December 22, 1870 (Saros 120)	November 21, 1881 (Saros 121)	October 20, 1892 (Saros 122)	September 21, 1903 (Saros 123)
August 21, 1914 (Saros 124)	July 20, 1925 (Saros 125)	June 19, 1936 (Saros 126)	May 20, 1947 (Saros 127)	April 19, 1958 (Saros 128)
March 18, 1969 (Saros 129)	February 16, 1980 (Saros 130)	January 15, 1991 (Saros 131)	December 14, 2001 (Saros 132)	November 13, 2012 (Saros 133)
October 14, 2023 (Saros 134)	September 12, 2034 (Saros 135)	August 12, 2045 (Saros 136)	July 12, 2056 (Saros 137)	June 11, 2067 (Saros 138)
May 11, 2078 (Saros 139)	April 10, 2089 (Saros 140)	March 10, 2100 (Saros 141)	February 8, 2111 (Saros 142)	January 8, 2122 (Saros 143)
December 7, 2132 (Saros 144)	November 7, 2143 (Saros 145)	October 7, 2154 (Saros 146)	September 5, 2165 (Saros 147)	August 4, 2176 (Saros 148)
July 6, 2187 (Saros 149)	June 4, 2198 (Saros 150)			

=== Inex series ===
This eclipse is a part of the long period inex cycle, repeating at alternating nodes, every 358 synodic months (≈ 10,571.95 days, or 29 years minus 20 days). Their appearance and longitude are irregular due to a lack of synchronization with the anomalistic month (period of perigee). However, groupings of 3 inex cycles (≈ 87 years minus 2 months) comes close (≈ 1,151.02 anomalistic months), so eclipses are similar in these groupings.

Series members between 1801 and 2200
August 28, 1802 (Saros 122)	August 7, 1831 (Saros 123)	July 18, 1860 (Saros 124)
June 28, 1889 (Saros 125)	June 8, 1918 (Saros 126)	May 20, 1947 (Saros 127)
April 29, 1976 (Saros 128)	April 8, 2005 (Saros 129)	March 20, 2034 (Saros 130)
February 28, 2063 (Saros 131)	February 7, 2092 (Saros 132)	January 19, 2121 (Saros 133)
December 30, 2149 (Saros 134)	December 9, 2178 (Saros 135)	
