= Solar eclipse of January 4, 1973 =

20th-century annular solar eclipse

- Annular eclipse
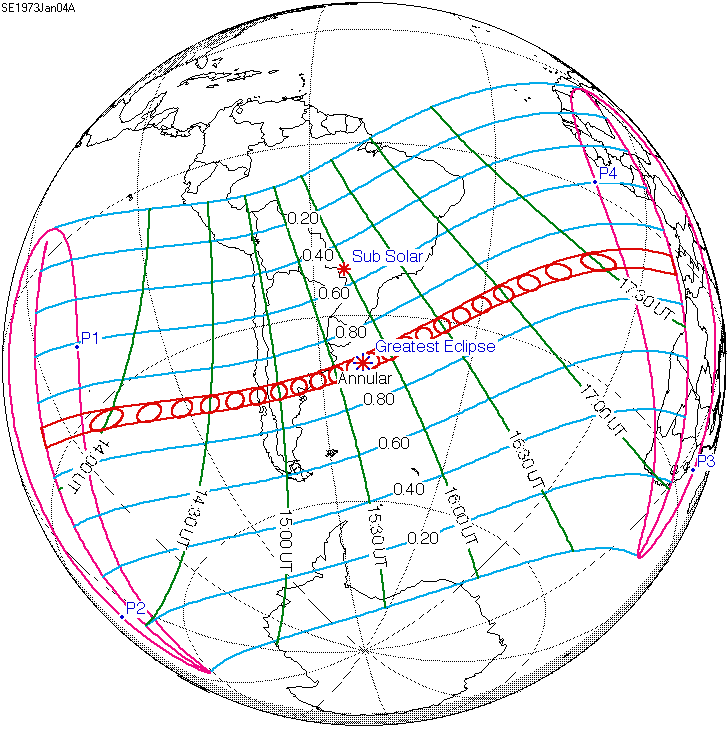
- Map
- Gamma: −0.2644
- Magnitude: 0.9303

Maximum eclipse
- Duration: 469 s (7 min 49 s)
- Coordinates: 37.9°S 51.2°W
- Max. width of band: 271 km (168 mi)

Times (UTC)
- Greatest eclipse: 15:46:21

References
- Saros: 131 (48 of 70)
- Catalog # (SE5000): 9449

An annular solar eclipse occurred at the Moon's ascending node of orbit on Thursday, January 4, 1973, with a magnitude of 0.9303. A solar eclipse occurs when the Moon passes between Earth and the Sun, thereby totally or partly obscuring the image of the Sun for a viewer on Earth. An annular solar eclipse occurs when the Moon's apparent diameter is smaller than the Sun's, blocking most of the Sun's light and causing the Sun to look like an annulus (ring). An annular eclipse appears as a partial eclipse over a region of the Earth thousands of kilometres wide. Occurring about 3.75 days after apogee (on December 31, 1972, at 21:50 UTC), the Moon's apparent diameter was smaller.

Annularity was visible from Chile and Argentina. A partial eclipse was visible for parts of southern and central South America, Antarctica, West Africa, and Southern Africa.

== Eclipse details ==
Shown below are two tables displaying details about this particular solar eclipse. The first table outlines times at which the Moon's penumbra or umbra attains the specific parameter, and the second table describes various other parameters pertaining to this eclipse.

January 4, 1973 Solar Eclipse Times
Event	Time (UTC)
First Penumbral External Contact	1973 January 4 at 12:44:40.6 UTC
First Umbral External Contact	1973 January 4 at 13:50:14.3 UTC
First Central Line	1973 January 4 at 13:53:17.7 UTC
First Umbral Internal Contact	1973 January 4 at 13:56:21.3 UTC
First Penumbral Internal Contact	1973 January 4 at 15:07:01.4 UTC
Greatest Duration	1973 January 4 at 15:35:51.4 UTC
Equatorial Conjunction	1973 January 4 at 15:39:50.9 UTC
Ecliptic Conjunction	1973 January 4 at 15:43:12.3 UTC
Greatest Eclipse	1973 January 4 at 15:46:20.7 UTC
Last Penumbral Internal Contact	1973 January 4 at 16:25:50.8 UTC
Last Umbral Internal Contact	1973 January 4 at 17:36:25.9 UTC
Last Central Line	1973 January 4 at 17:39:27.4 UTC
Last Umbral External Contact	1973 January 4 at 17:42:28.4 UTC
Last Penumbral External Contact	1973 January 4 at 18:47:58.6 UTC

January 4, 1973 Solar Eclipse Parameters
Parameter	Value
Eclipse Magnitude	0.93032
Eclipse Obscuration	0.86549
Gamma	−0.26441
Sun Right Ascension	19h01m31.4s
Sun Declination	-22°41'24.6"
Sun Semi-Diameter	16'15.9"
Sun Equatorial Horizontal Parallax	08.9"
Moon Right Ascension	19h01m44.3s
Moon Declination	-22°55'32.0"
Moon Semi-Diameter	14'54.7"
Moon Equatorial Horizontal Parallax	0°54'43.6"
ΔT	43.4 s

== Eclipse season ==
This eclipse is part of an eclipse season, a period, roughly every six months, when eclipses occur. Only two (or occasionally three) eclipse seasons occur each year, and each season lasts about 35 days and repeats just short of six months (173 days) later; thus two full eclipse seasons always occur each year. Either two or three eclipses happen each eclipse season. In the sequence below, each eclipse is separated by a fortnight.

Eclipse season of January 1973
January 4 Ascending node (new moon)	January 18 Descending node (full moon)
Annular solar eclipse Solar Saros 131	Penumbral lunar eclipse Lunar Saros 143

== Related eclipses ==
=== Eclipses in 1973 ===
- An annular solar eclipse on January 4.
- A penumbral lunar eclipse on January 18.
- A penumbral lunar eclipse on June 15.
- A total solar eclipse on June 30.
- A penumbral lunar eclipse on July 15.
- A partial lunar eclipse on December 10.
- An annular solar eclipse on December 24.

=== Metonic ===
- Preceded by: Solar eclipse of March 18, 1969
- Followed by: Solar eclipse of October 23, 1976

=== Tzolkinex ===
- Preceded by: Solar eclipse of November 23, 1965
- Followed by: Solar eclipse of February 16, 1980

=== Half-Saros ===
- Preceded by: Lunar eclipse of December 30, 1963
- Followed by: Lunar eclipse of January 9, 1982

=== Tritos ===
- Preceded by: Solar eclipse of February 5, 1962
- Followed by: Solar eclipse of December 4, 1983

=== Solar Saros 131 ===
- Preceded by: Solar eclipse of December 25, 1954
- Followed by: Solar eclipse of January 15, 1991

=== Inex ===
- Preceded by: Solar eclipse of January 25, 1944
- Followed by: Solar eclipse of December 14, 2001

=== Triad ===
- Preceded by: Solar eclipse of March 5, 1886
- Followed by: Solar eclipse of November 5, 2059

=== Solar eclipses of 1971–1974 ===
This eclipse is a member of a semester series. An eclipse in a semester series of solar eclipses repeats approximately every 177 days and 4 hours (a semester) at alternating nodes of the Moon's orbit.

The partial solar eclipses on February 25, 1971 and August 20, 1971 occur in the previous lunar year eclipse set.

Solar eclipse series sets from 1971 to 1974
Descending node			Ascending node		
Saros	Map	Gamma	Saros	Map	Gamma
116	July 22, 1971 Partial	1.513	121	January 16, 1972 Annular	−0.9365
126	July 10, 1972 Total	0.6872	131	January 4, 1973 Annular	−0.2644
136	June 30, 1973 Total	−0.0785	141	December 24, 1973 Annular	0.4171
146	June 20, 1974 Total	−0.8239	151	December 13, 1974 Partial	1.0797

=== Saros 131 ===
This eclipse is a part of Saros series 131, repeating every 18 years, 11 days, and containing 70 events. The series started with a partial solar eclipse on August 1, 1125. It contains total eclipses from March 27, 1522 through May 30, 1612; hybrid eclipses from June 10, 1630 through July 24, 1702; and annular eclipses from August 4, 1720 through June 18, 2243. The series ends at member 70 as a partial eclipse on September 2, 2369. Its eclipses are tabulated in three columns; every third eclipse in the same column is one exeligmos apart, so they all cast shadows over approximately the same parts of the Earth.

The longest duration of totality was produced by member 28 at 58 seconds on May 30, 1612, and the longest duration of annularity was produced by member 50 at 7 minutes, 54 seconds on January 26, 2009. All eclipses in this series occur at the Moon’s ascending node of orbit.

Series members 39–60 occur between 1801 and 2200:
39	40	41
September 28, 1810	October 9, 1828	October 20, 1846
42	43	44
October 30, 1864	November 10, 1882	November 22, 1900
45	46	47
December 3, 1918	December 13, 1936	December 25, 1954
48	49	50
January 4, 1973	January 15, 1991	January 26, 2009
51	52	53
February 6, 2027	February 16, 2045	February 28, 2063
54	55	56
March 10, 2081	March 21, 2099	April 2, 2117
57	58	59
April 13, 2135	April 23, 2153	May 5, 2171
60
May 15, 2189

=== Metonic series ===
The metonic series repeats eclipses every 19 years (6939.69 days), lasting about 5 cycles. Eclipses occur in nearly the same calendar date. In addition, the octon subseries repeats 1/5 of that or every 3.8 years (1387.94 days). All eclipses in this table occur at the Moon's ascending node.

22 eclipse events between January 5, 1935 and August 11, 2018
January 4–5	October 23–24	August 10–12	May 30–31	March 18–19
111	113	115	117	119
January 5, 1935		August 12, 1942	May 30, 1946	March 18, 1950
121	123	125	127	129
January 5, 1954	October 23, 1957	August 11, 1961	May 30, 1965	March 18, 1969
131	133	135	137	139
January 4, 1973	October 23, 1976	August 10, 1980	May 30, 1984	March 18, 1988
141	143	145	147	149
January 4, 1992	October 24, 1995	August 11, 1999	May 31, 2003	March 19, 2007
151	153	155		
January 4, 2011	October 23, 2014	August 11, 2018		

=== Tritos series ===
This eclipse is a part of a tritos cycle, repeating at alternating nodes every 135 synodic months (≈ 3986.63 days, or 11 years minus 1 month). Their appearance and longitude are irregular due to a lack of synchronization with the anomalistic month (period of perigee), but groupings of 3 tritos cycles (≈ 33 years minus 3 months) come close (≈ 434.044 anomalistic months), so eclipses are similar in these groupings.

Series members between 1801 and 2200
April 14, 1809 (Saros 116)	March 14, 1820 (Saros 117)	February 12, 1831 (Saros 118)	January 11, 1842 (Saros 119)	December 11, 1852 (Saros 120)
November 11, 1863 (Saros 121)	October 10, 1874 (Saros 122)	September 8, 1885 (Saros 123)	August 9, 1896 (Saros 124)	July 10, 1907 (Saros 125)
June 8, 1918 (Saros 126)	May 9, 1929 (Saros 127)	April 7, 1940 (Saros 128)	March 7, 1951 (Saros 129)	February 5, 1962 (Saros 130)
January 4, 1973 (Saros 131)	December 4, 1983 (Saros 132)	November 3, 1994 (Saros 133)	October 3, 2005 (Saros 134)	September 1, 2016 (Saros 135)
August 2, 2027 (Saros 136)	July 2, 2038 (Saros 137)	May 31, 2049 (Saros 138)	April 30, 2060 (Saros 139)	March 31, 2071 (Saros 140)
February 27, 2082 (Saros 141)	January 27, 2093 (Saros 142)	December 29, 2103 (Saros 143)	November 27, 2114 (Saros 144)	October 26, 2125 (Saros 145)
September 26, 2136 (Saros 146)	August 26, 2147 (Saros 147)	July 25, 2158 (Saros 148)	June 25, 2169 (Saros 149)	May 24, 2180 (Saros 150)
April 23, 2191 (Saros 151)

=== Inex series ===
This eclipse is a part of the long period inex cycle, repeating at alternating nodes, every 358 synodic months (≈ 10,571.95 days, or 29 years minus 20 days). Their appearance and longitude are irregular due to a lack of synchronization with the anomalistic month (period of perigee). However, groupings of 3 inex cycles (≈ 87 years minus 2 months) comes close (≈ 1,151.02 anomalistic months), so eclipses are similar in these groupings.

Series members between 1801 and 2200
April 14, 1828 (Saros 126)	March 25, 1857 (Saros 127)	March 5, 1886 (Saros 128)
February 14, 1915 (Saros 129)	January 25, 1944 (Saros 130)	January 4, 1973 (Saros 131)
December 14, 2001 (Saros 132)	November 25, 2030 (Saros 133)	November 5, 2059 (Saros 134)
October 14, 2088 (Saros 135)	September 26, 2117 (Saros 136)	September 6, 2146 (Saros 137)
August 16, 2175 (Saros 138)		
