= Solar eclipse of July 10, 1972 =

Total eclipse

- Total eclipse
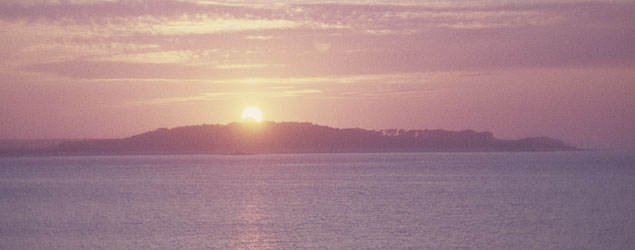

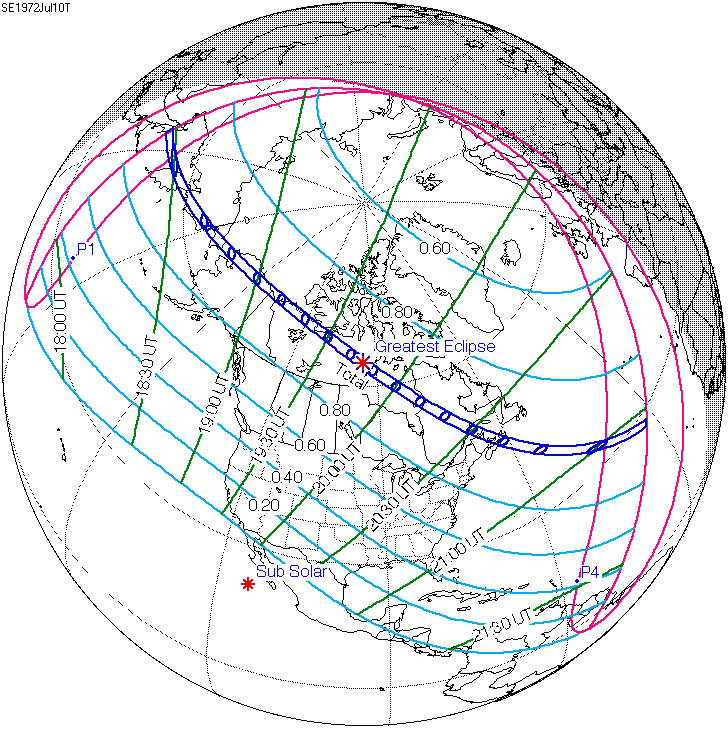
- Map
- Gamma: 0.6872
- Magnitude: 1.0379

Maximum eclipse
- Duration: 156 s (2 min 36 s)
- Coordinates: 63.5°N 94.2°W
- Max. width of band: 175 km (109 mi)

Times (UTC)
- Greatest eclipse: 19:46:38

References
- Saros: 126 (45 of 72)
- Catalog # (SE5000): 9448

A total solar eclipse occurred at the Moon's descending node of orbit between Monday, July 10 and Tuesday, July 11, 1972, with a magnitude of 1.0379. A solar eclipse occurs when the Moon passes between Earth and the Sun, thereby totally or partly obscuring the image of the Sun for a viewer on Earth. A total solar eclipse occurs when the Moon's apparent diameter is larger than the Sun's, blocking all direct sunlight, turning day into darkness. Totality occurs in a narrow path across Earth's surface, with the partial solar eclipse visible over a surrounding region thousands of kilometres wide. Occurring about 2.8 days after perigee (on July 7, 1972, at 23:50 UTC), the Moon's apparent diameter was larger.

It was visible as a total eclipse along a path of totality that began in Sea of Okhotsk and traversed the far eastern portions of the Soviet Union (which now belongs to Russia) on July 11 local time, northern Alaska in the United States, Northern Canada, eastern Quebec and the Canadian Maritimes on July 10 local time. A partial eclipse was visible for parts of the northern Soviet Union, North America, the Caribbean, northern South America, and Northern Europe.

The eclipse was mostly seen on July 10, 1972, except for the Asian part of Soviet Union and Japanese island of Hokkaido, where either a partial or a total eclipse was seen on July 11 local time, and part of the Soviet Union along the coast of Kara Sea, where a partial eclipse started on July 10, passing midnight and ended on July 11 due to the midnight sun.

== Observations ==
A team of the Academy of Sciences of the Soviet Union observed the total solar eclipse in Russkaya Koshka, Magadan Oblast (now separated into Chukotka Autonomous Okrug) on the coast of Gulf of Anadyr. The weather condition was clear, and the team successfully took images of the corona and made polarization observations to study its structure and physical characteristics. In Nova Scotia, Canada, the eclipse was clouded out and could not be observed. Besides that, 850 passengers boarded a cruise ship from New York City and saw a total eclipse successfully in North Atlantic Ocean. Many scientists also boarded the ship and did research, and some also gave classes in meteorology, oceanography, etc., which almost all passengers attended.

== "You're So Vain" ==
The eclipse is referenced in the lyrics of Carly Simon's 1972 hit song "You're So Vain." The subject of the song, after witnessing his racehorse win "naturally" at the Saratoga Race Course, flies his Learjet to Nova Scotia to see the eclipse; Simon uses the two phenomena as examples of how the subject seems to be "where (he) should be all the time." Simon released the song four months after the eclipse.

== Eclipse details ==
Shown below are two tables displaying details about this particular solar eclipse. The first table outlines times at which the Moon's penumbra or umbra attains the specific parameter, and the second table describes various other parameters pertaining to this eclipse.

July 10, 1972 Solar Eclipse Times
| Event | Time (UTC) |
|---|---|
| First Penumbral External Contact | 1972 July 10 at 17:19:47.5 UTC |
| First Umbral External Contact | 1972 July 10 at 18:28:23.8 UTC |
| First Central Line | 1972 July 10 at 18:29:24.0 UTC |
| First Umbral Internal Contact | 1972 July 10 at 18:30:24.5 UTC |
| Equatorial Conjunction | 1972 July 10 at 19:29:05.3 UTC |
| Ecliptic Conjunction | 1972 July 10 at 19:39:28.3 UTC |
| Greatest Duration | 1972 July 10 at 19:43:47.8 UTC |
| Greatest Eclipse | 1972 July 10 at 19:46:38.1 UTC |
| Last Umbral Internal Contact | 1972 July 10 at 21:03:06.0 UTC |
| Last Central Line | 1972 July 10 at 21:04:04.1 UTC |
| Last Umbral External Contact | 1972 July 10 at 21:05:01.8 UTC |
| Last Penumbral External Contact | 1972 July 10 at 22:13:41.2 UTC |

July 10, 1972 Solar Eclipse Parameters
| Parameter | Value |
|---|---|
| Eclipse Magnitude | 1.03790 |
| Eclipse Obscuration | 1.07723 |
| Gamma | 0.68719 |
| Sun Right Ascension | 07h20m39.3s |
| Sun Declination | +22°08'59.1" |
| Sun Semi-Diameter | 15'43.9" |
| Sun Equatorial Horizontal Parallax | 08.6" |
| Moon Right Ascension | 07h21m20.3s |
| Moon Declination | +22°48'27.6" |
| Moon Semi-Diameter | 16'08.2" |
| Moon Equatorial Horizontal Parallax | 0°59'13.3" |
| ΔT | 42.8 s |

== Eclipse season ==
This eclipse is part of an eclipse season, a period, roughly every six months, when eclipses occur. Only two (or occasionally three) eclipse seasons occur each year, and each season lasts about 35 days and repeats just short of six months (173 days) later; thus two full eclipse seasons always occur each year. Either two or three eclipses happen each eclipse season. In the sequence below, each eclipse is separated by a fortnight.

Eclipse season of July 1972
| July 10 Descending node (new moon) | July 26 Ascending node (full moon) |
|---|---|
| Total solar eclipse Solar Saros 126 | Partial lunar eclipse Lunar Saros 138 |

== Related eclipses ==
=== Eclipses in 1972 ===
- An annular solar eclipse on January 16.
- A total lunar eclipse on January 30.
- A total solar eclipse on July 10.
- A partial lunar eclipse on July 26.

=== Metonic ===
- Preceded by: Solar eclipse of September 22, 1968
- Followed by: Solar eclipse of April 29, 1976

=== Tzolkinex ===
- Preceded by: Solar eclipse of May 30, 1965
- Followed by: Solar eclipse of August 22, 1979

=== Half-Saros ===
- Preceded by: Lunar eclipse of July 6, 1963
- Followed by: Lunar eclipse of July 17, 1981

=== Tritos ===
- Preceded by: Solar eclipse of August 11, 1961
- Followed by: Solar eclipse of June 11, 1983

=== Solar Saros 126 ===
- Preceded by: Solar eclipse of June 30, 1954
- Followed by: Solar eclipse of July 22, 1990

=== Inex ===
- Preceded by: Solar eclipse of August 1, 1943
- Followed by: Solar eclipse of June 21, 2001

=== Triad ===
- Preceded by: Solar eclipse of September 8, 1885
- Followed by: Solar eclipse of May 11, 2059

=== Solar eclipses of 1971–1974 ===
This eclipse is a member of a semester series. An eclipse in a semester series of solar eclipses repeats approximately every 177 days and 4 hours (a semester) at alternating nodes of the Moon's orbit.

The partial solar eclipses on February 25, 1971 and August 20, 1971 occur in the previous lunar year eclipse set.

Solar eclipse series sets from 1971 to 1974
| Descending node | | | Ascending node | | |
| Saros | Map | Gamma | Saros | Map | Gamma |
| 116 | July 22, 1971 Partial | 1.513 | 121 | January 16, 1972 Annular | −0.9365 |
| 126 | July 10, 1972 Total | 0.6872 | 131 | January 4, 1973 Annular | −0.2644 |
| 136 | June 30, 1973 Total | −0.0785 | 141 | December 24, 1973 Annular | 0.4171 |
| 146 | June 20, 1974 Total | −0.8239 | 151 | December 13, 1974 Partial | 1.0797 |

=== Saros 126 ===
This eclipse is a part of Saros series 126, repeating every 18 years, 11 days, and containing 72 events. The series started with a partial solar eclipse on March 10, 1179. It contains annular eclipses from June 4, 1323 through April 4, 1810; hybrid eclipses from April 14, 1828 through May 6, 1864; and total eclipses from May 17, 1882 through August 23, 2044. The series ends at member 72 as a partial eclipse on May 3, 2459. Its eclipses are tabulated in three columns; every third eclipse in the same column is one exeligmos apart, so they all cast shadows over approximately the same parts of the Earth.

The longest duration of annularity was produced by member 11 at 6 minutes, 30 seconds on June 26, 1359, and the longest duration of totality was produced by member 45 at 2 minutes, 36 seconds on July 10, 1972. All eclipses in this series occur at the Moon’s descending node of orbit.

Series members 36–57 occur between 1801 and 2200:
| 36 | 37 | 38 |
|---|---|---|
| April 4, 1810 | April 14, 1828 | April 25, 1846 |
| 39 | 40 | 41 |
| May 6, 1864 | May 17, 1882 | May 28, 1900 |
| 42 | 43 | 44 |
| June 8, 1918 | June 19, 1936 | June 30, 1954 |
| 45 | 46 | 47 |
| July 10, 1972 | July 22, 1990 | August 1, 2008 |
| 48 | 49 | 50 |
| August 12, 2026 | August 23, 2044 | September 3, 2062 |
| 51 | 52 | 53 |
| September 13, 2080 | September 25, 2098 | October 6, 2116 |
| 54 | 55 | 56 |
| October 17, 2134 | October 28, 2152 | November 8, 2170 |
57
November 18, 2188

=== Metonic series ===
The metonic series repeats eclipses every 19 years (6939.69 days), lasting about 5 cycles. Eclipses occur in nearly the same calendar date. In addition, the octon subseries repeats 1/5 of that or every 3.8 years (1387.94 days). All eclipses in this table occur at the Moon's descending node.

21 eclipse events between July 11, 1953 and July 11, 2029
| July 10–11 | April 29–30 | February 15–16 | December 4 | September 21–23 |
| 116 | 118 | 120 | 122 | 124 |
|---|---|---|---|---|
| July 11, 1953 | April 30, 1957 | February 15, 1961 | December 4, 1964 | September 22, 1968 |
| 126 | 128 | 130 | 132 | 134 |
| July 10, 1972 | April 29, 1976 | February 16, 1980 | December 4, 1983 | September 23, 1987 |
| 136 | 138 | 140 | 142 | 144 |
| July 11, 1991 | April 29, 1995 | February 16, 1999 | December 4, 2002 | September 22, 2006 |
| 146 | 148 | 150 | 152 | 154 |
| July 11, 2010 | April 29, 2014 | February 15, 2018 | December 4, 2021 | September 21, 2025 |
156
July 11, 2029

=== Tritos series ===
This eclipse is a part of a tritos cycle, repeating at alternating nodes every 135 synodic months (≈ 3986.63 days, or 11 years minus 1 month). Their appearance and longitude are irregular due to a lack of synchronization with the anomalistic month (period of perigee), but groupings of 3 tritos cycles (≈ 33 years minus 3 months) come close (≈ 434.044 anomalistic months), so eclipses are similar in these groupings.

Series members between 1801 and 2200
| October 19, 1808 (Saros 111) | September 19, 1819 (Saros 112) | August 18, 1830 (Saros 113) | July 18, 1841 (Saros 114) | June 17, 1852 (Saros 115) |
| May 17, 1863 (Saros 116) | April 16, 1874 (Saros 117) | March 16, 1885 (Saros 118) | February 13, 1896 (Saros 119) | January 14, 1907 (Saros 120) |
| December 14, 1917 (Saros 121) | November 12, 1928 (Saros 122) | October 12, 1939 (Saros 123) | September 12, 1950 (Saros 124) | August 11, 1961 (Saros 125) |
| July 10, 1972 (Saros 126) | June 11, 1983 (Saros 127) | May 10, 1994 (Saros 128) | April 8, 2005 (Saros 129) | March 9, 2016 (Saros 130) |
| February 6, 2027 (Saros 131) | January 5, 2038 (Saros 132) | December 5, 2048 (Saros 133) | November 5, 2059 (Saros 134) | October 4, 2070 (Saros 135) |
| September 3, 2081 (Saros 136) | August 3, 2092 (Saros 137) | July 4, 2103 (Saros 138) | June 3, 2114 (Saros 139) | May 3, 2125 (Saros 140) |
| April 1, 2136 (Saros 141) | March 2, 2147 (Saros 142) | January 30, 2158 (Saros 143) | December 29, 2168 (Saros 144) | November 28, 2179 (Saros 145) |
October 29, 2190 (Saros 146)

=== Inex series ===
This eclipse is a part of the long period inex cycle, repeating at alternating nodes, every 358 synodic months (≈ 10,571.95 days, or 29 years minus 20 days). Their appearance and longitude are irregular due to a lack of synchronization with the anomalistic month (period of perigee). However, groupings of 3 inex cycles (≈ 87 years minus 2 months) comes close (≈ 1,151.02 anomalistic months), so eclipses are similar in these groupings.

Series members between 1801 and 2200
| October 20, 1827 (Saros 121) | September 29, 1856 (Saros 122) | September 8, 1885 (Saros 123) |
| August 21, 1914 (Saros 124) | August 1, 1943 (Saros 125) | July 10, 1972 (Saros 126) |
| June 21, 2001 (Saros 127) | June 1, 2030 (Saros 128) | May 11, 2059 (Saros 129) |
| April 21, 2088 (Saros 130) | April 2, 2117 (Saros 131) | March 12, 2146 (Saros 132) |
| February 21, 2175 (Saros 133) | | |
