= Solar eclipse of January 15, 1991 =

20th-century annular solar eclipse

- Annular eclipse
- Map
- Gamma: −0.2727
- Magnitude: 0.929

Maximum eclipse
- Duration: 473 s (7 min 53 s)
- Coordinates: 36.4°S 170.4°W
- Max. width of band: 277 km (172 mi)

Times (UTC)
- Greatest eclipse: 23:53:51

References
- Saros: 131 (49 of 70)
- Catalog # (SE5000): 9488

External images
- https://pauldmaley.com/1991-annular-solar-eclipse-in-new-zealand-results/
- http://www.phys.ttu.edu/~ozprof/se15191.htm

An annular solar eclipse occurred at the Moon's ascending node of orbit between Tuesday, January 15 and Wednesday, January 16, 1991, with a magnitude of 0.929. A solar eclipse occurs when the Moon passes between Earth and the Sun, thereby totally or partly obscuring the image of the Sun for a viewer on Earth. An annular solar eclipse occurs when the Moon's apparent diameter is smaller than the Sun's, blocking most of the Sun's light and causing the Sun to look like an annulus (ring). An annular eclipse appears as a partial eclipse over a region of the Earth thousands of kilometres wide. Occurring 3.5 days after apogee (on January 12, 1991, at 11:00 UTC), the Moon's apparent diameter was smaller.

Annularity was visible in southwestern Western Australia, Tasmania, New Zealand and French Polynesia. A partial eclipse was visible for parts of Indonesia, Australia, Oceania, and Antarctica.

== Eclipse timing ==
=== Places experiencing annular eclipse ===
Solar Eclipse of January 15, 1991 (Local Times)
Country or territory	City or place	Start of partial eclipse	Start of annular eclipse	Maximum eclipse	End of annular eclipse	End of partial eclipse	Duration of annularity (min:s)	Duration of eclipse (hr:min)	Maximum coverage
Australia	Perth (Note: The times listed for this location occur on January 16, 1991, local time.)	05:25:57 (sunrise)	05:57:27	06:00:18	06:03:07	07:10:48	5:40	1:45	84.04%
Australia	Mandurah	05:25:11 (sunrise)	05:57:57	06:00:48	06:03:39	07:11:17	5:42	1:46	84.05%
Australia	Bunbury	05:23:33 (sunrise)	05:59:21	06:01:33	06:03:43	07:12:01	4:22	1:48	84.07%
Australia	Esperance	04:57:22 (sunrise)	05:59:10	06:01:55	06:04:40	07:16:14	5:30	2:19	84.30%
Australia	Currie	08:01:37	09:16:40	09:19:34	09:22:29	10:49:46	5:49	2:48	85.25%
Australia	Launceston	08:04:33	09:21:13	09:24:35	09:27:58	10:56:41	6:45	2:52	85.39%
New Zealand	Greymouth	10:28:07	12:01:38	12:04:59	12:08:21	13:48:22	6:43	3:20	86.15%
New Zealand	Richmond	10:30:25	12:05:38	12:09:27	12:13:16	13:54:02	7:38	3:24	86.21%
New Zealand	Nelson	10:30:32	12:05:54	12:09:41	12:13:29	13:54:20	7:35	3:24	86.21%
New Zealand	Blenheim	10:31:45	12:07:14	12:11:06	12:14:57	13:55:27	7:43	3:24	86.22%
New Zealand	Wellington	10:32:59	12:09:07	12:13:00	12:16:52	13:57:30	7:45	3:25	86.24%
New Zealand	Paraparaumu	10:33:12	12:09:54	12:13:40	12:17:27	13:58:32	7:33	3:25	86.25%
New Zealand	Palmerston North	10:34:00	12:12:09	12:15:19	12:18:29	14:00:39	6:20	3:27	86.27%

=== Places experiencing partial eclipse ===
Solar Eclipse of January 15, 1991 (Local Times)
Country or territory	City or place	Start of partial eclipse	Maximum eclipse	End of partial eclipse	Duration of eclipse (hr:min)	Maximum coverage
Timor-Leste	Dili	05:30:10 (sunrise)	05:47:37	06:37:19	1:07	13.71%
Australia	Darwin	06:32:48 (sunrise)	07:19:51	08:17:26	1:45	18.18%
Papua New Guinea	Port Moresby	07:31:52	08:04:56	08:41:20	1:09	2.09%
Australia	Adelaide	07:25:43	08:39:46	10:06:19	2:41	76.93%
Indonesia	Denpasar	06:11:28 (sunrise)	06:13:51	06:41:12	0:30	14.30%
Australia	Melbourne	07:59:55	09:18:34	10:50:17	2:50	81.45%
Australia	Canberra	08:00:06	09:21:18	10:56:52	2:57	71.09%
Australia	Brisbane	08:02:12	09:22:02	10:57:44	2:56	43.46%
Australia	Sydney	08:00:48	09:23:11	11:00:31	3:00	65.33%
Solomon Islands	Honiara	09:26:36	09:39:36	09:53:03	0:26	0.05%
Antarctica	Casey Station	06:00:01	06:43:01	07:27:35	1:28	12.31%
New Caledonia	Nouméa	08:29:44	09:58:12	11:38:40	3:09	25.91%
Norfolk Island	Kingston	08:52:48	10:30:07	12:18:46	3:26	47.38%
Vanuatu	Port Vila	09:47:28	11:09:21	12:39:32	2:52	14.64%
New Zealand	Auckland	10:31:55	12:15:20	14:03:31	3:32	77.31%
Fiji	Suva	10:12:24	11:53:21	13:28:59	3:17	23.71%
Tonga	Nuku'alofa	11:18:35	13:09:47	14:49:16	3:31	40.81%
Tuvalu	Funafuti	11:10:55	12:19:10	13:21:34	2:11	5.16%
Wallis and Futuna	Mata Utu	10:47:53	12:25:06	13:50:10	3:02	20.01%
Niue	Alofi	11:39:01	13:30:00	15:04:49	3:26	44.79%
Samoa	Apia	11:54:50	13:37:22	15:04:35	3:10	28.57%
American Samoa	Pago Pago	11:55:14	13:39:13	15:07:16	3:12	31.54%
Cook Islands	Rarotonga	13:28:02	15:17:10	16:48:17	3:20	70.85%
Tokelau	Fakaofo	12:17:24	13:49:21	15:07:22	2:50	19.82%
French Polynesia	Papeete	13:30:49	15:09:57	16:32:17	3:01	82.36%
Clipperton Island	Clipperton Island	16:47:36	17:11:35	17:13:56 (sunset)	0:26	21.57%
Pitcairn Islands	Adamstown	15:24:59	16:41:41	17:48:33	2:24	49.59%
Chile	Easter Island	19:20:12	20:12:58	21:01:23	1:41	21.97%
Kiribati	Kiritimati	14:19:46	15:34:31	16:38:30	2:19	21.01%

== Eclipse details ==
Shown below are two tables displaying details about this particular solar eclipse. The first table outlines times at which the Moon's penumbra or umbra attains the specific parameter, and the second table describes various other parameters pertaining to this eclipse.

January 15, 1991 Solar Eclipse Times
Event	Time (UTC)
First Penumbral External Contact	1991 January 15 at 20:51:57.9 UTC
First Umbral External Contact	1991 January 15 at 21:57:45.6 UTC
First Central Line	1991 January 15 at 22:00:52.7 UTC
First Umbral Internal Contact	1991 January 15 at 22:04:00.1 UTC
First Penumbral Internal Contact	1991 January 15 at 23:15:21.5 UTC
Greatest Duration	1991 January 15 at 23:40:06.1 UTC
Equatorial Conjunction	1991 January 15 at 23:44:29.4 UTC
Ecliptic Conjunction	1991 January 15 at 23:50:36.9 UTC
Greatest Eclipse	1991 January 15 at 23:53:51.3 UTC
Last Penumbral Internal Contact	1991 January 16 at 00:32:36.2 UTC
Last Umbral Internal Contact	1991 January 16 at 01:43:50.2 UTC
Last Central Line	1991 January 16 at 01:46:55.5 UTC
Last Umbral External Contact	1991 January 16 at 01:50:00.3 UTC
Last Penumbral External Contact	1991 January 16 at 02:55:44.0 UTC

January 15, 1991 Solar Eclipse Parameters
Parameter	Value
Eclipse Magnitude	0.92901
Eclipse Obscuration	0.86306
Gamma	−0.27275
Sun Right Ascension	19h49m11.2s
Sun Declination	-21°04'21.2"
Sun Semi-Diameter	16'15.5"
Sun Equatorial Horizontal Parallax	08.9"
Moon Right Ascension	19h49m29.1s
Moon Declination	-21°18'36.9"
Moon Semi-Diameter	14'53.1"
Moon Equatorial Horizontal Parallax	0°54'37.7"
ΔT	57.6 s

== Eclipse season ==
This eclipse is part of an eclipse season, a period, roughly every six months, when eclipses occur. Only two (or occasionally three) eclipse seasons occur each year, and each season lasts about 35 days and repeats just short of six months (173 days) later; thus two full eclipse seasons always occur each year. Either two or three eclipses happen each eclipse season. In the sequence below, each eclipse is separated by a fortnight.

Eclipse season of January 1991
January 15 Ascending node (new moon)	January 30 Descending node (full moon)
Annular solar eclipse Solar Saros 131	Penumbral lunar eclipse Lunar Saros 143

== Related eclipses ==
=== Eclipses in 1991 ===
- An annular solar eclipse on January 15.
- A penumbral lunar eclipse on January 30.
- A penumbral lunar eclipse on June 27.
- A total solar eclipse on July 11.
- A penumbral lunar eclipse on July 26.
- A partial lunar eclipse on December 21.

=== Metonic ===
- Preceded by: Solar eclipse of March 29, 1987
- Followed by: Solar eclipse of November 3, 1994

=== Tzolkinex ===
- Preceded by: Solar eclipse of December 4, 1983
- Followed by: Solar eclipse of February 26, 1998

=== Half-Saros ===
- Preceded by: Lunar eclipse of January 9, 1982
- Followed by: Lunar eclipse of January 21, 2000

=== Tritos ===
- Preceded by: Solar eclipse of February 16, 1980
- Followed by: Solar eclipse of December 14, 2001

=== Solar Saros 131 ===
- Preceded by: Solar eclipse of January 4, 1973
- Followed by: Solar eclipse of January 26, 2009

=== Inex ===
- Preceded by: Solar eclipse of February 5, 1962
- Followed by: Solar eclipse of December 26, 2019

=== Triad ===
- Preceded by: Solar eclipse of March 17, 1904
- Followed by: Solar eclipse of November 15, 2077

=== Solar eclipses of 1990–1992 ===
This eclipse is a member of a semester series. An eclipse in a semester series of solar eclipses repeats approximately every 177 days and 4 hours (a semester) at alternating nodes of the Moon's orbit.

Solar eclipse series sets from 1990 to 1992
Ascending node			Descending node		
Saros	Map	Gamma	Saros	Map	Gamma
121	January 26, 1990 Annular	−0.9457	126 Partial in Finland	July 22, 1990 Total	0.7597
131	January 15, 1991 Annular	−0.2727	136 Totality in Playas del Coco, Costa Rica	July 11, 1991 Total	−0.0041
141	January 4, 1992 Annular	0.4091	146	June 30, 1992 Total	−0.7512
151	December 24, 1992 Partial	1.0711			

=== Saros 131 ===
This eclipse is a part of Saros series 131, repeating every 18 years, 11 days, and containing 70 events. The series started with a partial solar eclipse on August 1, 1125. It contains total eclipses from March 27, 1522 through May 30, 1612; hybrid eclipses from June 10, 1630 through July 24, 1702; and annular eclipses from August 4, 1720 through June 18, 2243. The series ends at member 70 as a partial eclipse on September 2, 2369. Its eclipses are tabulated in three columns; every third eclipse in the same column is one exeligmos apart, so they all cast shadows over approximately the same parts of the Earth.

The longest duration of totality was produced by member 28 at 58 seconds on May 30, 1612, and the longest duration of annularity was produced by member 50 at 7 minutes, 54 seconds on January 26, 2009. All eclipses in this series occur at the Moon’s ascending node of orbit.

Series members 39–60 occur between 1801 and 2200:
39	40	41
September 28, 1810	October 9, 1828	October 20, 1846
42	43	44
October 30, 1864	November 10, 1882	November 22, 1900
45	46	47
December 3, 1918	December 13, 1936	December 25, 1954
48	49	50
January 4, 1973	January 15, 1991	January 26, 2009
51	52	53
February 6, 2027	February 16, 2045	February 28, 2063
54	55	56
March 10, 2081	March 21, 2099	April 2, 2117
57	58	59
April 13, 2135	April 23, 2153	May 5, 2171
60
May 15, 2189

=== Metonic series ===
The metonic series repeats eclipses every 19 years (6939.69 days), lasting about 5 cycles. Eclipses occur in nearly the same calendar date. In addition, the octon subseries repeats 1/5 of that or every 3.8 years (1387.94 days). All eclipses in this table occur at the Moon's ascending node.

20 eclipse events between June 10, 1964 and August 21, 2036
June 10–11	March 28–29	January 14–16	November 3	August 21–22
117	119	121	123	125
June 10, 1964	March 28, 1968	January 16, 1972	November 3, 1975	August 22, 1979
127	129	131	133	135
June 11, 1983	March 29, 1987	January 15, 1991	November 3, 1994	August 22, 1998
137	139	141	143	145
June 10, 2002	March 29, 2006	January 15, 2010	November 3, 2013	August 21, 2017
147	149	151	153	155
June 10, 2021	March 29, 2025	January 14, 2029	November 3, 2032	August 21, 2036

=== Tritos series ===
This eclipse is a part of a tritos cycle, repeating at alternating nodes every 135 synodic months (≈ 3986.63 days, or 11 years minus 1 month). Their appearance and longitude are irregular due to a lack of synchronization with the anomalistic month (period of perigee), but groupings of 3 tritos cycles (≈ 33 years minus 3 months) come close (≈ 434.044 anomalistic months), so eclipses are similar in these groupings.

Series members between 1801 and 2200
June 26, 1805 (Saros 114)	May 27, 1816 (Saros 115)	April 26, 1827 (Saros 116)	March 25, 1838 (Saros 117)	February 23, 1849 (Saros 118)
January 23, 1860 (Saros 119)	December 22, 1870 (Saros 120)	November 21, 1881 (Saros 121)	October 20, 1892 (Saros 122)	September 21, 1903 (Saros 123)
August 21, 1914 (Saros 124)	July 20, 1925 (Saros 125)	June 19, 1936 (Saros 126)	May 20, 1947 (Saros 127)	April 19, 1958 (Saros 128)
March 18, 1969 (Saros 129)	February 16, 1980 (Saros 130)	January 15, 1991 (Saros 131)	December 14, 2001 (Saros 132)	November 13, 2012 (Saros 133)
October 14, 2023 (Saros 134)	September 12, 2034 (Saros 135)	August 12, 2045 (Saros 136)	July 12, 2056 (Saros 137)	June 11, 2067 (Saros 138)
May 11, 2078 (Saros 139)	April 10, 2089 (Saros 140)	March 10, 2100 (Saros 141)	February 8, 2111 (Saros 142)	January 8, 2122 (Saros 143)
December 7, 2132 (Saros 144)	November 7, 2143 (Saros 145)	October 7, 2154 (Saros 146)	September 5, 2165 (Saros 147)	August 4, 2176 (Saros 148)
July 6, 2187 (Saros 149)	June 4, 2198 (Saros 150)			

=== Inex series ===
This eclipse is a part of the long period inex cycle, repeating at alternating nodes, every 358 synodic months (≈ 10,571.95 days, or 29 years minus 20 days). Their appearance and longitude are irregular due to a lack of synchronization with the anomalistic month (period of perigee). However, groupings of 3 inex cycles (≈ 87 years minus 2 months) comes close (≈ 1,151.02 anomalistic months), so eclipses are similar in these groupings.

Series members between 1801 and 2200
May 16, 1817 (Saros 125)	April 25, 1846 (Saros 126)	April 6, 1875 (Saros 127)
March 17, 1904 (Saros 128)	February 24, 1933 (Saros 129)	February 5, 1962 (Saros 130)
January 15, 1991 (Saros 131)	December 26, 2019 (Saros 132)	December 5, 2048 (Saros 133)
November 15, 2077 (Saros 134)	October 26, 2106 (Saros 135)	October 7, 2135 (Saros 136)
September 16, 2164 (Saros 137)	August 26, 2193 (Saros 138)	
