= Solar eclipse of September 23, 1987 =

20th-century annular solar eclipse

- Annular eclipse
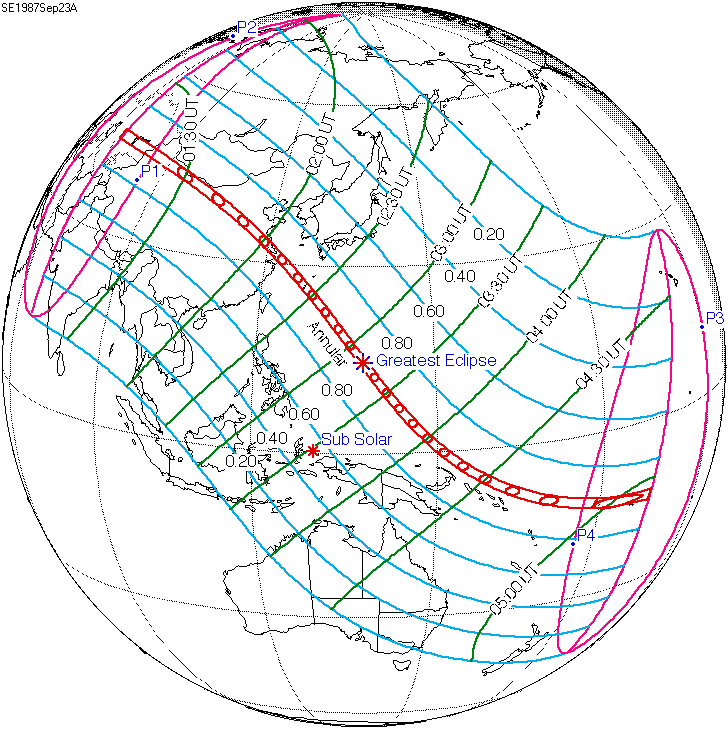
- Map
- Gamma: 0.2787
- Magnitude: 0.9634

Maximum eclipse
- Duration: 229 s (3 min 49 s)
- Coordinates: 14.3°N 138.4°E
- Max. width of band: 137 km (85 mi)

Times (UTC)
- Greatest eclipse: 3:12:22

References
- Saros: 134 (42 of 71)
- Catalog # (SE5000): 9481

An annular solar eclipse occurred at the Moon's descending node of orbit on Wednesday, September 23, 1987, with a magnitude of 0.9634. A solar eclipse occurs when the Moon passes between Earth and the Sun, thereby totally or partly obscuring the image of the Sun for a viewer on Earth. An annular solar eclipse occurs when the Moon's apparent diameter is smaller than the Sun's, blocking most of the Sun's light and causing the Sun to look like an annulus (ring). An annular eclipse appears as a partial eclipse over a region of the Earth thousands of kilometres wide. Occurring only 5 days after apogee (on September 18, 1987, at 4:00 UTC), the Moon's apparent diameter was smaller.

Annularity was visible in the Soviet Union (today's Kazakhstan), China (including Shanghai), southwestern Mongolia, Okinawa Islands of Japan except Kume Island and the southwestern tip of Kerama Islands, the Federal States of Micronesia, Papua New Guinea, Solomon Islands, Rotuma Islands of Fiji, Wallis Islands and West Samoa (the name changed to Samoa later). A partial eclipse was visible for parts of South Asia, Southeast Asia, East Asia, Australia, Oceania, and Hawaii.

== Observation ==
Five radio observation stations were present in China at the time of the eclipse, two of which were within the annularity, in Ürümqi and Shanghai respectively. A partial solar eclipse was observed from the other three, including one in Nanjing where the eclipse was close to annularity, and the rest two in Beijing and Kunming. The Department of Mathematics and Physics of the Chinese Academy of Sciences and the Chinese Astronomical Society held a meeting in Kunming in December 1986, deciding that on-site observation would be conducted at each station, among which the Shanghai Astronomical Observatory was considered to have the best location with a larger magnitude of the eclipse, longer duration and larger solar zenith angle. The Shanghai Astronomical Observatory conducted observations with seven different wave bands using a 25-metre radio telescope. The Yunnan Astronomical Observatory located in Kunming also conducted a multi-band joint observation of the partial solar eclipse.

The Chinese Research Institute of Radio Wave Propagation conducted observations with a high-frequency skywave radar located in Xinxiang on the southern limit of annularity. Uneven structure and motion were observed in the ionosphere, the highest operating frequency was found changed during the eclipse, and large-scale fluctuations continued after the eclipse.

== Eclipse details ==
Shown below are two tables displaying details about this particular solar eclipse. The first table outlines times at which the Moon's penumbra or umbra attains the specific parameter, and the second table describes various other parameters pertaining to this eclipse.

September 23, 1987 Solar Eclipse Times
Event	Time (UTC)
First Penumbral External Contact	1987 September 23 at 00:15:50.5 UTC
First Umbral External Contact	1987 September 23 at 01:20:19.5 UTC
First Central Line	1987 September 23 at 01:22:07.2 UTC
First Umbral Internal Contact	1987 September 23 at 01:23:55.0 UTC
First Penumbral Internal Contact	1987 September 23 at 02:33:48.6 UTC
Greatest Duration	1987 September 23 at 02:45:44.7 UTC
Equatorial Conjunction	1987 September 23 at 02:54:28.0 UTC
Ecliptic Conjunction	1987 September 23 at 03:09:08.4 UTC
Greatest Eclipse	1987 September 23 at 03:12:21.6 UTC
Last Penumbral Internal Contact	1987 September 23 at 03:51:20.8 UTC
Last Umbral Internal Contact	1987 September 23 at 05:01:01.1 UTC
Last Central Line	1987 September 23 at 05:02:46.3 UTC
Last Umbral External Contact	1987 September 23 at 05:04:31.2 UTC
Last Penumbral External Contact	1987 September 23 at 06:08:54.0 UTC

September 23, 1987 Solar Eclipse Parameters
Parameter	Value
Eclipse Magnitude	0.96337
Eclipse Obscuration	0.92807
Gamma	0.27869
Sun Right Ascension	11h58m25.1s
Sun Declination	+00°10'17.1"
Sun Semi-Diameter	15'56.2"
Sun Equatorial Horizontal Parallax	08.8"
Moon Right Ascension	11h58m55.2s
Moon Declination	+00°23'45.5"
Moon Semi-Diameter	15'07.6"
Moon Equatorial Horizontal Parallax	0°55'30.9"
ΔT	55.7 s

== Eclipse season ==
This eclipse is part of an eclipse season, a period, roughly every six months, when eclipses occur. Only two (or occasionally three) eclipse seasons occur each year, and each season lasts about 35 days and repeats just short of six months (173 days) later; thus two full eclipse seasons always occur each year. Either two or three eclipses happen each eclipse season. In the sequence below, each eclipse is separated by a fortnight.

Eclipse season of September–October 1987
September 23 Descending node (new moon)	October 7 Ascending node (full moon)
Annular solar eclipse Solar Saros 134	Penumbral lunar eclipse Lunar Saros 146

== Related eclipses ==
=== Eclipses in 1987 ===
- A hybrid solar eclipse on March 29.
- A penumbral lunar eclipse on April 14.
- An annular solar eclipse on September 23.
- A penumbral lunar eclipse on October 7.

=== Metonic ===
- Preceded by: Solar eclipse of December 4, 1983
- Followed by: Solar eclipse of July 11, 1991

=== Tzolkinex ===
- Preceded by: Solar eclipse of August 10, 1980
- Followed by: Solar eclipse of November 3, 1994

=== Half-Saros ===
- Preceded by: Lunar eclipse of September 16, 1978
- Followed by: Lunar eclipse of September 27, 1996

=== Tritos ===
- Preceded by: Solar eclipse of October 23, 1976
- Followed by: Solar eclipse of August 22, 1998

=== Solar Saros 134 ===
- Preceded by: Solar eclipse of September 11, 1969
- Followed by: Solar eclipse of October 3, 2005

=== Inex ===
- Preceded by: Solar eclipse of October 12, 1958
- Followed by: Solar eclipse of September 1, 2016

=== Triad ===
- Preceded by: Solar eclipse of November 22, 1900
- Followed by: Solar eclipse of July 24, 2074

=== Solar eclipses of 1986–1989 ===
This eclipse is a member of a semester series. An eclipse in a semester series of solar eclipses repeats approximately every 177 days and 4 hours (a semester) at alternating nodes of the Moon's orbit.

Solar eclipse series sets from 1986 to 1989
Ascending node			Descending node		
Saros	Map	Gamma	Saros	Map	Gamma
119	April 9, 1986 Partial	−1.0822	124	October 3, 1986 Hybrid	0.9931
129	March 29, 1987 Hybrid	−0.3053	134	September 23, 1987 Annular	0.2787
139	March 18, 1988 Total	0.4188	144	September 11, 1988 Annular	−0.4681
149	March 7, 1989 Partial	1.0981	154	August 31, 1989 Partial	−1.1928

=== Saros 134 ===
This eclipse is a part of Saros series 134, repeating every 18 years, 11 days, and containing 71 events. The series started with a partial solar eclipse on June 22, 1248. It contains total eclipses from October 9, 1428 through December 24, 1554; hybrid eclipses from January 3, 1573 through June 27, 1843; and annular eclipses from July 8, 1861 through May 21, 2384. The series ends at member 72 as a partial eclipse on August 6, 2510. Its eclipses are tabulated in three columns; every third eclipse in the same column is one exeligmos apart, so they all cast shadows over approximately the same parts of the Earth.

The longest duration of totality was produced by member 11 at 1 minutes, 30 seconds on October 9, 1428, and the longest duration of annularity will be produced by member 52 at 10 minutes, 55 seconds on January 10, 2168. All eclipses in this series occur at the Moon’s descending node of orbit.

Series members 32–53 occur between 1801 and 2200:
32	33	34
June 6, 1807	June 16, 1825	June 27, 1843
35	36	37
July 8, 1861	July 19, 1879	July 29, 1897
38	39	40
August 10, 1915	August 21, 1933	September 1, 1951
41	42	43
September 11, 1969	September 23, 1987	October 3, 2005
44	45	46
October 14, 2023	October 25, 2041	November 5, 2059
47	48	49
November 15, 2077	November 27, 2095	December 8, 2113
50	51	52
December 19, 2131	December 30, 2149	January 10, 2168
53
January 20, 2186

=== Metonic series ===
The metonic series repeats eclipses every 19 years (6939.69 days), lasting about 5 cycles. Eclipses occur in nearly the same calendar date. In addition, the octon subseries repeats 1/5 of that or every 3.8 years (1387.94 days). All eclipses in this table occur at the Moon's descending node.

21 eclipse events between July 11, 1953 and July 11, 2029
July 10–11	April 29–30	February 15–16	December 4	September 21–23
116	118	120	122	124
July 11, 1953	April 30, 1957	February 15, 1961	December 4, 1964	September 22, 1968
126	128	130	132	134
July 10, 1972	April 29, 1976	February 16, 1980	December 4, 1983	September 23, 1987
136	138	140	142	144
July 11, 1991	April 29, 1995	February 16, 1999	December 4, 2002	September 22, 2006
146	148	150	152	154
July 11, 2010	April 29, 2014	February 15, 2018	December 4, 2021	September 21, 2025
156
July 11, 2029

=== Tritos series ===
This eclipse is a part of a tritos cycle, repeating at alternating nodes every 135 synodic months (≈ 3986.63 days, or 11 years minus 1 month). Their appearance and longitude are irregular due to a lack of synchronization with the anomalistic month (period of perigee), but groupings of 3 tritos cycles (≈ 33 years minus 3 months) come close (≈ 434.044 anomalistic months), so eclipses are similar in these groupings.

Series members between 1801 and 2200
March 4, 1802 (Saros 117)	February 1, 1813 (Saros 118)	January 1, 1824 (Saros 119)	November 30, 1834 (Saros 120)	October 30, 1845 (Saros 121)
September 29, 1856 (Saros 122)	August 29, 1867 (Saros 123)	July 29, 1878 (Saros 124)	June 28, 1889 (Saros 125)	May 28, 1900 (Saros 126)
April 28, 1911 (Saros 127)	March 28, 1922 (Saros 128)	February 24, 1933 (Saros 129)	January 25, 1944 (Saros 130)	December 25, 1954 (Saros 131)
November 23, 1965 (Saros 132)	October 23, 1976 (Saros 133)	September 23, 1987 (Saros 134)	August 22, 1998 (Saros 135)	July 22, 2009 (Saros 136)
June 21, 2020 (Saros 137)	May 21, 2031 (Saros 138)	April 20, 2042 (Saros 139)	March 20, 2053 (Saros 140)	February 17, 2064 (Saros 141)
January 16, 2075 (Saros 142)	December 16, 2085 (Saros 143)	November 15, 2096 (Saros 144)	October 16, 2107 (Saros 145)	September 15, 2118 (Saros 146)
August 15, 2129 (Saros 147)	July 14, 2140 (Saros 148)	June 14, 2151 (Saros 149)	May 14, 2162 (Saros 150)	April 12, 2173 (Saros 151)
March 12, 2184 (Saros 152)	February 10, 2195 (Saros 153)			

=== Inex series ===
This eclipse is a part of the long period inex cycle, repeating at alternating nodes, every 358 synodic months (≈ 10,571.95 days, or 29 years minus 20 days). Their appearance and longitude are irregular due to a lack of synchronization with the anomalistic month (period of perigee). However, groupings of 3 inex cycles (≈ 87 years minus 2 months) comes close (≈ 1,151.02 anomalistic months), so eclipses are similar in these groupings.

Series members between 1801 and 2200
January 21, 1814 (Saros 128)	December 31, 1842 (Saros 129)	December 12, 1871 (Saros 130)
November 22, 1900 (Saros 131)	November 1, 1929 (Saros 132)	October 12, 1958 (Saros 133)
September 23, 1987 (Saros 134)	September 1, 2016 (Saros 135)	August 12, 2045 (Saros 136)
July 24, 2074 (Saros 137)	July 4, 2103 (Saros 138)	June 13, 2132 (Saros 139)
May 25, 2161 (Saros 140)	May 4, 2190 (Saros 141)	
