= Solar eclipse of June 11, 1983 =

Total eclipse

- Total eclipse
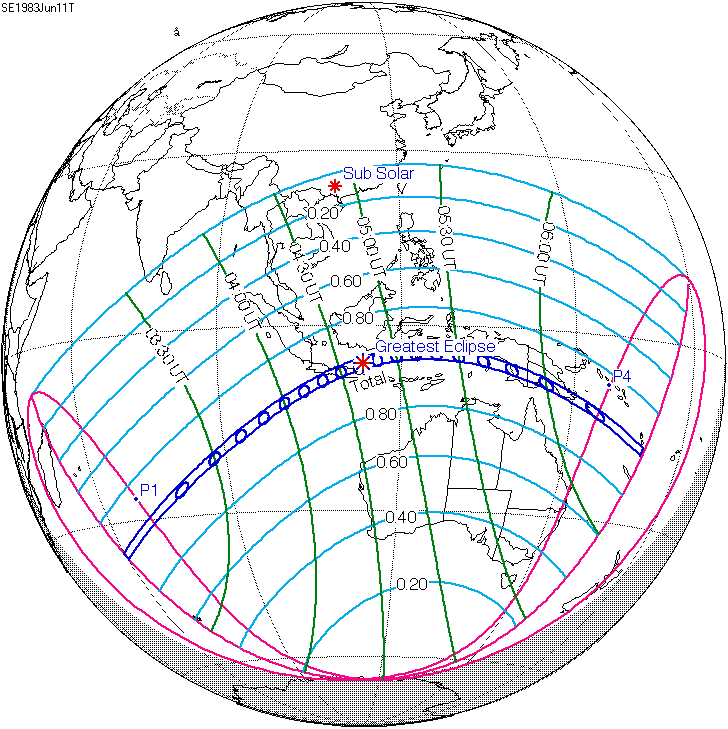
- Map
- Gamma: −0.4947
- Magnitude: 1.0524

Maximum eclipse
- Duration: 311 s (5 min 11 s)
- Coordinates: 6.2°S 114.2°E
- Max. width of band: 199 km (124 mi)

Times (UTC)
- Greatest eclipse: 4:43:33

References
- Saros: 127 (56 of 82)
- Catalog # (SE5000): 9472

A total solar eclipse occurred at the Moon's ascending node of orbit on Saturday, June 11, 1983, with a magnitude of 1.0524. A solar eclipse occurs when the Moon passes between Earth and the Sun, thereby totally or partly obscuring the image of the Sun for a viewer on Earth. A total solar eclipse occurs when the Moon's apparent diameter is larger than the Sun's, blocking all direct sunlight, turning day into darkness. Totality occurs in a narrow path across Earth's surface, with the partial solar eclipse visible over a surrounding region thousands of kilometres wide. Occurring about 2.1 days before perigee (on June 13, 1983, at 6:50 UTC), the Moon's apparent diameter was larger.

The path of totality went through Christmas Island, Indonesia, Papua New Guinea, and terminated in Vanuatu. The maximum eclipse occurred off the Indonesian island of Madura. Major Indonesian cities witnessed totality, including Yogyakarta, Semarang, Surabaya, and Makassar, in addition to Port Moresby in Papua New Guinea. A partial eclipse was visible for parts of Madagascar, Southeast Asia, Australia, and western Oceania.

== Restrictions of observation ==
To avoid blindness, Indonesian dictator president Suharto prohibited local people from observing the eclipse directly through then Information Minister Harmoko, only allowing foreigners to observe from faraway places. Besides the requirements of closing and draping over all windows and airshafts, children were asked to hide themselves in cupboards and below desks as the eclipsing sun's rays were said to be more dangerous to children than to adults. They were allowed to watch a live broadcast of the eclipse occurring over Borobudur Temple in Magelang, Central Java, on state-owned TV channel TVRI. Because of the difference in restriction's intensity between regions, some locals did observe it.

== Observation ==
The Chinese Eclipse Observation Team formed by Beijing Astronomical Observatory (now incorporated into the National Astronomical Observatories of China), Purple Mountain Observatory and Nanjing Astronomical Instrument Factory conducted observation in Port Moresby. Observation in Port Moresby was successful due to the cloudless weather during the eclipse, compared with the cloudy weather in Yogyakarta where teams from many countries went. The Chinese team did spectrum observations of the chromosphere and corona, the broadband corona luminosity and polarization, and the coloured photography of the whole eclipse process.

== Eclipse details ==
Shown below are two tables displaying details about this particular solar eclipse. The first table outlines times at which the Moon's penumbra or umbra attains the specific parameter, and the second table describes various other parameters pertaining to this eclipse.

June 11, 1983 Solar Eclipse Times
Event	Time (UTC)
First Penumbral External Contact	1983 June 11 at 02:10:25.6 UTC
First Umbral External Contact	1983 June 11 at 03:11:02.4 UTC
First Central Line	1983 June 11 at 03:12:11.5 UTC
First Umbral Internal Contact	1983 June 11 at 03:13:20.8 UTC
Equatorial Conjunction	1983 June 11 at 04:34:18.1 UTC
Ecliptic Conjunction	1983 June 11 at 04:38:24.4 UTC
Greatest Eclipse	1983 June 11 at 04:43:33.5 UTC
Greatest Duration	1983 June 11 at 04:47:29.5 UTC
Last Umbral Internal Contact	1983 June 11 at 06:13:50.0 UTC
Last Central Line	1983 June 11 at 06:15:01.3 UTC
Last Umbral External Contact	1983 June 11 at 06:16:12.4 UTC
Last Penumbral External Contact	1983 June 11 at 07:16:41.1 UTC

June 11, 1983 Solar Eclipse Parameters
Parameter	Value
Eclipse Magnitude	1.05240
Eclipse Obscuration	1.10755
Gamma	−0.49475
Sun Right Ascension	05h15m15.1s
Sun Declination	+23°02'34.8"
Sun Semi-Diameter	15'45.1"
Sun Equatorial Horizontal Parallax	08.7"
Moon Right Ascension	05h15m37.5s
Moon Declination	+22°33'26.4"
Moon Semi-Diameter	16'20.3"
Moon Equatorial Horizontal Parallax	0°59'57.8"
ΔT	53.3 s

== Eclipse season ==
This eclipse is part of an eclipse season, a period, roughly every six months, when eclipses occur. Only two (or occasionally three) eclipse seasons occur each year, and each season lasts about 35 days and repeats just short of six months (173 days) later; thus two full eclipse seasons always occur each year. Either two or three eclipses happen each eclipse season. In the sequence below, each eclipse is separated by a fortnight.

Eclipse season of June 1983
June 11 Ascending node (new moon)	June 25 Descending node (full moon)
Total solar eclipse Solar Saros 127	Partial lunar eclipse Lunar Saros 139

== Related eclipses ==
=== Eclipses in 1983 ===
- A total solar eclipse on June 11.
- A partial lunar eclipse on June 25.
- An annular solar eclipse on December 4.
- A penumbral lunar eclipse on December 20.

=== Metonic ===
- Preceded by: Solar eclipse of August 22, 1979
- Followed by: Solar eclipse of March 29, 1987

=== Tzolkinex ===
- Preceded by: Solar eclipse of April 29, 1976
- Followed by: Solar eclipse of July 22, 1990

=== Half-Saros ===
- Preceded by: Lunar eclipse of June 4, 1974
- Followed by: Lunar eclipse of June 15, 1992

=== Tritos ===
- Preceded by: Solar eclipse of July 10, 1972
- Followed by: Solar eclipse of May 10, 1994

=== Solar Saros 127 ===
- Preceded by: Solar eclipse of May 30, 1965
- Followed by: Solar eclipse of June 21, 2001

=== Inex ===
- Preceded by: Solar eclipse of June 30, 1954
- Followed by: Solar eclipse of May 20, 2012

=== Triad ===
- Preceded by: Solar eclipse of August 9, 1896
- Followed by: Solar eclipse of April 11, 2070

=== Solar eclipses of 1982–1985 ===
This eclipse is a member of a semester series. An eclipse in a semester series of solar eclipses repeats approximately every 177 days and 4 hours (a semester) at alternating nodes of the Moon's orbit.

The partial solar eclipses on January 25, 1982 and July 20, 1982 occur in the previous lunar year eclipse set.

Solar eclipse series sets from 1982 to 1985
Ascending node			Descending node		
Saros	Map	Gamma	Saros	Map	Gamma
117	June 21, 1982 Partial	−1.2102	122	December 15, 1982 Partial	1.1293
127	June 11, 1983 Total	−0.4947	132	December 4, 1983 Annular	0.4015
137	May 30, 1984 Annular	0.2755	142 Partial in Gisborne, New Zealand	November 22, 1984 Total	−0.3132
147	May 19, 1985 Partial	1.072	152	November 12, 1985 Total	−0.9795

=== Saros 127 ===
This eclipse is a part of Saros series 127, repeating every 18 years, 11 days, and containing 82 events. The series started with a partial solar eclipse on October 10, 991 AD. It contains total eclipses from May 14, 1352 through August 15, 2091. There are no annular or hybrid eclipses in this set. The series ends at member 82 as a partial eclipse on March 21, 2452. Its eclipses are tabulated in three columns; every third eclipse in the same column is one exeligmos apart, so they all cast shadows over approximately the same parts of the Earth.

The longest duration of totality was produced by member 31 at 5 minutes, 40 seconds on August 30, 1532. All eclipses in this series occur at the Moon’s ascending node of orbit.

Series members 46–68 occur between 1801 and 2200:
46	47	48
February 21, 1803	March 4, 1821	March 15, 1839
49	50	51
March 25, 1857	April 6, 1875	April 16, 1893
52	53	54
April 28, 1911	May 9, 1929	May 20, 1947
55	56	57
May 30, 1965	June 11, 1983	June 21, 2001
58	59	60
July 2, 2019	July 13, 2037	July 24, 2055
61	62	63
August 3, 2073	August 15, 2091	August 26, 2109
64	65	66
September 6, 2127	September 16, 2145	September 28, 2163
67	68	
October 8, 2181	October 19, 2199	

=== Metonic series ===
The metonic series repeats eclipses every 19 years (6939.69 days), lasting about 5 cycles. Eclipses occur in nearly the same calendar date. In addition, the octon subseries repeats 1/5 of that or every 3.8 years (1387.94 days). All eclipses in this table occur at the Moon's ascending node.

20 eclipse events between June 10, 1964 and August 21, 2036
June 10–11	March 28–29	January 14–16	November 3	August 21–22
117	119	121	123	125
June 10, 1964	March 28, 1968	January 16, 1972	November 3, 1975	August 22, 1979
127	129	131	133	135
June 11, 1983	March 29, 1987	January 15, 1991	November 3, 1994	August 22, 1998
137	139	141	143	145
June 10, 2002	March 29, 2006	January 15, 2010	November 3, 2013	August 21, 2017
147	149	151	153	155
June 10, 2021	March 29, 2025	January 14, 2029	November 3, 2032	August 21, 2036

=== Tritos series ===
This eclipse is a part of a tritos cycle, repeating at alternating nodes every 135 synodic months (≈ 3986.63 days, or 11 years minus 1 month). Their appearance and longitude are irregular due to a lack of synchronization with the anomalistic month (period of perigee), but groupings of 3 tritos cycles (≈ 33 years minus 3 months) come close (≈ 434.044 anomalistic months), so eclipses are similar in these groupings.

Series members between 1801 and 2200
October 19, 1808 (Saros 111)	September 19, 1819 (Saros 112)	August 18, 1830 (Saros 113)	July 18, 1841 (Saros 114)	June 17, 1852 (Saros 115)
May 17, 1863 (Saros 116)	April 16, 1874 (Saros 117)	March 16, 1885 (Saros 118)	February 13, 1896 (Saros 119)	January 14, 1907 (Saros 120)
December 14, 1917 (Saros 121)	November 12, 1928 (Saros 122)	October 12, 1939 (Saros 123)	September 12, 1950 (Saros 124)	August 11, 1961 (Saros 125)
July 10, 1972 (Saros 126)	June 11, 1983 (Saros 127)	May 10, 1994 (Saros 128)	April 8, 2005 (Saros 129)	March 9, 2016 (Saros 130)
February 6, 2027 (Saros 131)	January 5, 2038 (Saros 132)	December 5, 2048 (Saros 133)	November 5, 2059 (Saros 134)	October 4, 2070 (Saros 135)
September 3, 2081 (Saros 136)	August 3, 2092 (Saros 137)	July 4, 2103 (Saros 138)	June 3, 2114 (Saros 139)	May 3, 2125 (Saros 140)
April 1, 2136 (Saros 141)	March 2, 2147 (Saros 142)	January 30, 2158 (Saros 143)	December 29, 2168 (Saros 144)	November 28, 2179 (Saros 145)
October 29, 2190 (Saros 146)

=== Inex series ===
This eclipse is a part of the long period inex cycle, repeating at alternating nodes, every 358 synodic months (≈ 10,571.95 days, or 29 years minus 20 days). Their appearance and longitude are irregular due to a lack of synchronization with the anomalistic month (period of perigee). However, groupings of 3 inex cycles (≈ 87 years minus 2 months) comes close (≈ 1,151.02 anomalistic months), so eclipses are similar in these groupings.

Series members between 1801 and 2200
October 9, 1809 (Saros 121)	September 18, 1838 (Saros 122)	August 29, 1867 (Saros 123)
August 9, 1896 (Saros 124)	July 20, 1925 (Saros 125)	June 30, 1954 (Saros 126)
June 11, 1983 (Saros 127)	May 20, 2012 (Saros 128)	April 30, 2041 (Saros 129)
April 11, 2070 (Saros 130)	March 21, 2099 (Saros 131)	March 1, 2128 (Saros 132)
February 9, 2157 (Saros 133)	January 20, 2186 (Saros 134)	
