= Solar eclipse of December 4, 1983 =

20th-century annular solar eclipse

- Annular eclipse
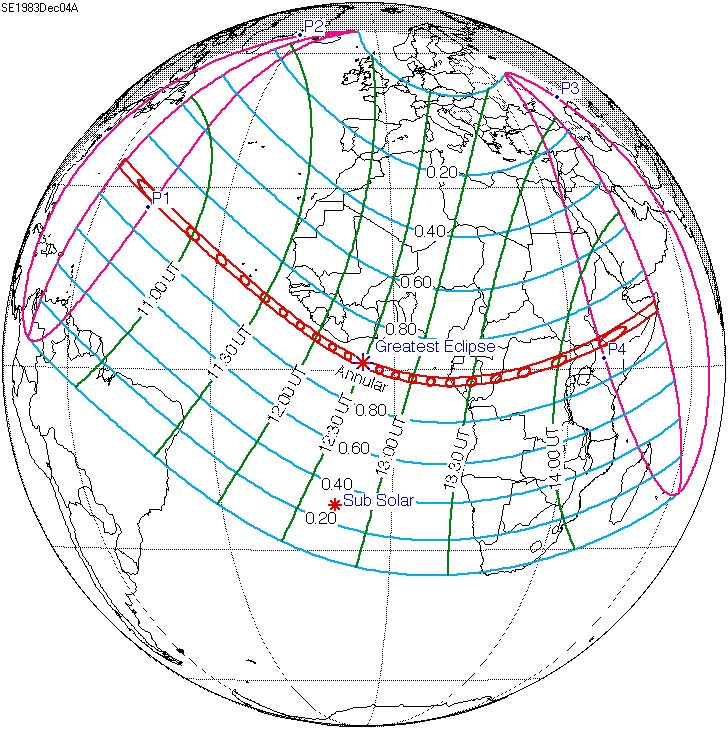
- Map
- Gamma: 0.4015
- Magnitude: 0.9666

Maximum eclipse
- Duration: 241 s (4 min 1 s)
- Coordinates: 0.9°N 4.7°W
- Max. width of band: 131 km (81 mi)

Times (UTC)
- Greatest eclipse: 12:31:15

References
- Saros: 132 (44 of 71)
- Catalog # (SE5000): 9473

An annular solar eclipse occurred at the Moon's descending node of orbit on Sunday, December 4, 1983, with a magnitude of 0.9666. A solar eclipse occurs when the Moon passes between Earth and the Sun, thereby totally or partly obscuring the image of the Sun for a viewer on Earth. An annular solar eclipse occurs when the Moon's apparent diameter is smaller than the Sun's, blocking most of the Sun's light and causing the Sun to look like an annulus (ring). An annular eclipse appears as a partial eclipse over a region of the Earth thousands of kilometres wide. Occurring about 6.5 days before apogee (on December 11, 1983, at 12:30 UTC), the Moon's apparent diameter was smaller.

Annularity was visible in Cape Verde, Annobón Island of Equatorial Guinea, Gabon, the People's Republic of Congo (today's Republic of Congo), Zaire (today's Democratic Republic of Congo), northern Uganda, southern Sudan (today's South Sudan), northwestern Kenya, Ethiopia and Somalia. A partial eclipse was visible for parts of northern South America, Southern Europe, Africa, and the Middle East.

== Eclipse details ==
Shown below are two tables displaying details about this particular solar eclipse. The first table outlines times at which the Moon's penumbra or umbra attains the specific parameter, and the second table describes various other parameters pertaining to this eclipse.

December 4, 1983 Solar Eclipse Times
Event	Time (UTC)
First Penumbral External Contact	1983 December 4 at 09:41:52.5 UTC
First Umbral External Contact	1983 December 4 at 10:46:44.4 UTC
First Central Line	1983 December 4 at 10:48:24.1 UTC
First Umbral Internal Contact	1983 December 4 at 10:50:04.1 UTC
First Penumbral Internal Contact	1983 December 4 at 12:11:46.8 UTC
Equatorial Conjunction	1983 December 4 at 12:20:29.0 UTC
Ecliptic Conjunction	1983 December 4 at 12:26:45.1 UTC
Greatest Eclipse	1983 December 4 at 12:31:15.1 UTC
Last Penumbral Internal Contact	1983 December 4 at 12:50:58.3 UTC
Greatest Duration	1983 December 4 at 12:51:39.2 UTC
Last Umbral Internal Contact	1983 December 4 at 14:12:31.0 UTC
Last Central Line	1983 December 4 at 14:14:13.9 UTC
Last Umbral External Contact	1983 December 4 at 14:15:56.6 UTC
Last Penumbral External Contact	1983 December 4 at 15:20:48.9 UTC

December 4, 1983 Solar Eclipse Parameters
Parameter	Value
Eclipse Magnitude	0.96656
Eclipse Obscuration	0.93425
Gamma	0.40150
Sun Right Ascension	16h41m03.6s
Sun Declination	-22°12'07.8"
Sun Semi-Diameter	16'13.7"
Sun Equatorial Horizontal Parallax	08.9"
Moon Right Ascension	16h41m26.3s
Moon Declination	-21°50'01.7"
Moon Semi-Diameter	15'27.6"
Moon Equatorial Horizontal Parallax	0°56'44.4"
ΔT	53.7 s

== Eclipse season ==
This eclipse is part of an eclipse season, a period, roughly every six months, when eclipses occur. Only two (or occasionally three) eclipse seasons occur each year, and each season lasts about 35 days and repeats just short of six months (173 days) later; thus two full eclipse seasons always occur each year. Either two or three eclipses happen each eclipse season. In the sequence below, each eclipse is separated by a fortnight.

Eclipse season of December 1983
December 4 Descending node (new moon)	December 20 Ascending node (full moon)
Annular solar eclipse Solar Saros 132	Penumbral lunar eclipse Lunar Saros 144

== Related eclipses ==
=== Eclipses in 1983 ===
- A total solar eclipse on June 11.
- A partial lunar eclipse on June 25.
- An annular solar eclipse on December 4.
- A penumbral lunar eclipse on December 20.

=== Metonic ===
- Preceded by: Solar eclipse of February 16, 1980
- Followed by: Solar eclipse of September 23, 1987

=== Tzolkinex ===
- Preceded by: Solar eclipse of October 23, 1976
- Followed by: Solar eclipse of January 15, 1991

=== Half-Saros ===
- Preceded by: Lunar eclipse of November 29, 1974
- Followed by: Lunar eclipse of December 9, 1992

=== Tritos ===
- Preceded by: Solar eclipse of January 4, 1973
- Followed by: Solar eclipse of November 3, 1994

=== Solar Saros 132 ===
- Preceded by: Solar eclipse of November 23, 1965
- Followed by: Solar eclipse of December 14, 2001

=== Inex ===
- Preceded by: Solar eclipse of December 25, 1954
- Followed by: Solar eclipse of November 13, 2012

=== Triad ===
- Preceded by: Solar eclipse of February 1, 1897
- Followed by: Solar eclipse of October 4, 2070

=== Solar eclipses of 1982–1985 ===
This eclipse is a member of a semester series. An eclipse in a semester series of solar eclipses repeats approximately every 177 days and 4 hours (a semester) at alternating nodes of the Moon's orbit.

The partial solar eclipses on January 25, 1982 and July 20, 1982 occur in the previous lunar year eclipse set.

Solar eclipse series sets from 1982 to 1985
Ascending node			Descending node		
Saros	Map	Gamma	Saros	Map	Gamma
117	June 21, 1982 Partial	−1.2102	122	December 15, 1982 Partial	1.1293
127	June 11, 1983 Total	−0.4947	132	December 4, 1983 Annular	0.4015
137	May 30, 1984 Annular	0.2755	142 Partial in Gisborne, New Zealand	November 22, 1984 Total	−0.3132
147	May 19, 1985 Partial	1.072	152	November 12, 1985 Total	−0.9795

=== Saros 132 ===
This eclipse is a part of Saros series 132, repeating every 18 years, 11 days, and containing 71 events. The series started with a partial solar eclipse on August 13, 1208. It contains annular eclipses from March 17, 1569 through March 12, 2146; hybrid eclipses on March 23, 2164 and April 3, 2182; and total eclipses from April 14, 2200 through June 19, 2308. The series ends at member 71 as a partial eclipse on September 25, 2470. Its eclipses are tabulated in three columns; every third eclipse in the same column is one exeligmos apart, so they all cast shadows over approximately the same parts of the Earth.

The longest duration of annularity was produced by member 25 at 6 minutes, 56 seconds on May 9, 1641, and the longest duration of totality will be produced by member 61 at 2 minutes, 14 seconds on June 8, 2290. All eclipses in this series occur at the Moon’s descending node of orbit.

Series members 34–56 occur between 1801 and 2200:
34	35	36
August 17, 1803	August 27, 1821	September 7, 1839
37	38	39
September 18, 1857	September 29, 1875	October 9, 1893
40	41	42
October 22, 1911	November 1, 1929	November 12, 1947
43	44	45
November 23, 1965	December 4, 1983	December 14, 2001
46	47	48
December 26, 2019	January 5, 2038	January 16, 2056
49	50	51
January 27, 2074	February 7, 2092	February 18, 2110
52	53	54
March 1, 2128	March 12, 2146	March 23, 2164
55	56	
April 3, 2182	April 14, 2200	

=== Metonic series ===
The metonic series repeats eclipses every 19 years (6939.69 days), lasting about 5 cycles. Eclipses occur in nearly the same calendar date. In addition, the octon subseries repeats 1/5 of that or every 3.8 years (1387.94 days). All eclipses in this table occur at the Moon's descending node.

21 eclipse events between July 11, 1953 and July 11, 2029
July 10–11	April 29–30	February 15–16	December 4	September 21–23
116	118	120	122	124
July 11, 1953	April 30, 1957	February 15, 1961	December 4, 1964	September 22, 1968
126	128	130	132	134
July 10, 1972	April 29, 1976	February 16, 1980	December 4, 1983	September 23, 1987
136	138	140	142	144
July 11, 1991	April 29, 1995	February 16, 1999	December 4, 2002	September 22, 2006
146	148	150	152	154
July 11, 2010	April 29, 2014	February 15, 2018	December 4, 2021	September 21, 2025
156
July 11, 2029

=== Tritos series ===
This eclipse is a part of a tritos cycle, repeating at alternating nodes every 135 synodic months (≈ 3986.63 days, or 11 years minus 1 month). Their appearance and longitude are irregular due to a lack of synchronization with the anomalistic month (period of perigee), but groupings of 3 tritos cycles (≈ 33 years minus 3 months) come close (≈ 434.044 anomalistic months), so eclipses are similar in these groupings.

Series members between 1801 and 2200
April 14, 1809 (Saros 116)	March 14, 1820 (Saros 117)	February 12, 1831 (Saros 118)	January 11, 1842 (Saros 119)	December 11, 1852 (Saros 120)
November 11, 1863 (Saros 121)	October 10, 1874 (Saros 122)	September 8, 1885 (Saros 123)	August 9, 1896 (Saros 124)	July 10, 1907 (Saros 125)
June 8, 1918 (Saros 126)	May 9, 1929 (Saros 127)	April 7, 1940 (Saros 128)	March 7, 1951 (Saros 129)	February 5, 1962 (Saros 130)
January 4, 1973 (Saros 131)	December 4, 1983 (Saros 132)	November 3, 1994 (Saros 133)	October 3, 2005 (Saros 134)	September 1, 2016 (Saros 135)
August 2, 2027 (Saros 136)	July 2, 2038 (Saros 137)	May 31, 2049 (Saros 138)	April 30, 2060 (Saros 139)	March 31, 2071 (Saros 140)
February 27, 2082 (Saros 141)	January 27, 2093 (Saros 142)	December 29, 2103 (Saros 143)	November 27, 2114 (Saros 144)	October 26, 2125 (Saros 145)
September 26, 2136 (Saros 146)	August 26, 2147 (Saros 147)	July 25, 2158 (Saros 148)	June 25, 2169 (Saros 149)	May 24, 2180 (Saros 150)
April 23, 2191 (Saros 151)

=== Inex series ===
This eclipse is a part of the long period inex cycle, repeating at alternating nodes, every 358 synodic months (≈ 10,571.95 days, or 29 years minus 20 days). Their appearance and longitude are irregular due to a lack of synchronization with the anomalistic month (period of perigee). However, groupings of 3 inex cycles (≈ 87 years minus 2 months) comes close (≈ 1,151.02 anomalistic months), so eclipses are similar in these groupings.

Series members between 1801 and 2200
April 4, 1810 (Saros 126)	March 15, 1839 (Saros 127)	February 23, 1868 (Saros 128)
February 1, 1897 (Saros 129)	January 14, 1926 (Saros 130)	December 25, 1954 (Saros 131)
December 4, 1983 (Saros 132)	November 13, 2012 (Saros 133)	October 25, 2041 (Saros 134)
October 4, 2070 (Saros 135)	September 14, 2099 (Saros 136)	August 25, 2128 (Saros 137)
August 5, 2157 (Saros 138)	July 16, 2186 (Saros 139)	
