= Solar eclipse of May 30, 1965 =

Total eclipse

- Total eclipse
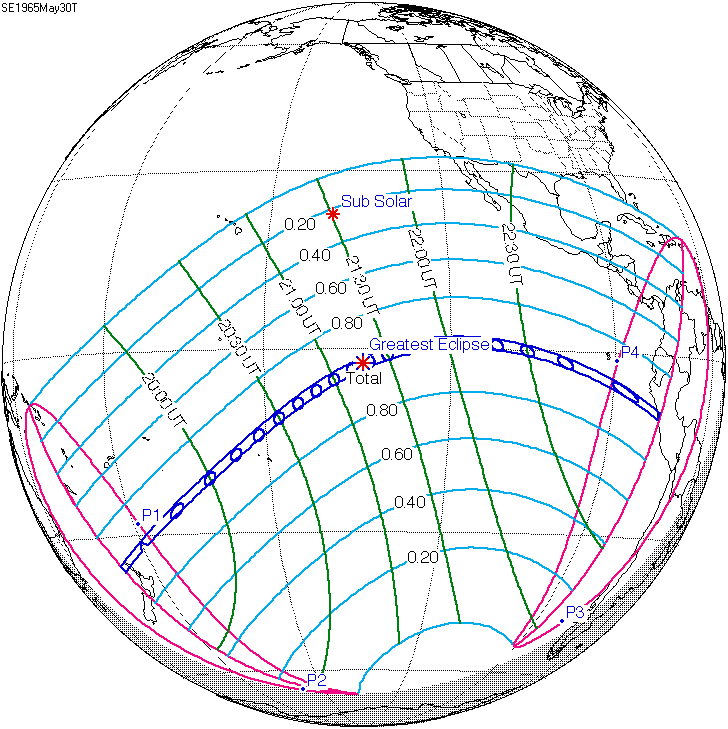
- Map
- Gamma: −0.4225
- Magnitude: 1.0544

Maximum eclipse
- Duration: 315 s (5 min 15 s)
- Coordinates: 2.5°S 133.8°W
- Max. width of band: 198 km (123 mi)

Times (UTC)
- Greatest eclipse: 21:17:31

References
- Saros: 127 (55 of 82)
- Catalog # (SE5000): 9432

A total solar eclipse occurred at the Moon's ascending node of orbit between Sunday, May 30 and Monday, May 31, 1965, with a magnitude of 1.0544. A solar eclipse occurs when the Moon passes between Earth and the Sun, thereby totally or partly obscuring the image of the Sun for a viewer on Earth. A total solar eclipse occurs when the Moon's apparent diameter is larger than the Sun's, blocking all direct sunlight, turning day into darkness. Totality occurs in a narrow path across Earth's surface, with the partial solar eclipse visible over a surrounding region thousands of kilometres wide. Occurring about 1.9 days before perigee (on June 1, 1965, at 19:20 UTC), the Moon's apparent diameter was larger.

As most of the eclipse's path was over open ocean, a prolonged observation was made by a jet transport; flying parallel to the path of the eclipse at 587 mph (945 km/h), this gave scientists what was at the time the "longest probe in man's history into the conditions of a solar eclipse", for nearly ten minutes. The expedition involved scientists from NASA, Belgium, Italy, the Netherlands, and Switzerland; in total, 30 researchers and 13 separate research projects were represented on the plane. The plane, operated by NASA, took off from Hilo, Hawaii, and met up with the path of the eclipse approximately 1,000 mi (1,600 km) south of there. While mostly invisible from land, some ground-based observers in an 85-mile-wide strip of northern New Zealand were able to clearly view the event.

Totality was visible from northwestern Northland Region in New Zealand on May 31 (Monday), and Manuae in Cook Islands, Manuae and Motu One in French Polynesia, and Peru on May 30 (Sunday). A partial eclipse was visible for parts of Oceania, Mexico, Central America, the Caribbean, and western South America.

== Observations ==
New Zealand, Australia, the United Kingdom, the United States, Germany, Japan and the Soviet Union sent observation teams to Manuae, Cook Islands to observe the total eclipse. The New Zealand government deployed ships to transport passengers from Rarotonga, the island where the national capital Avarua is located, to Manuae. The atoll has a total area of 1,524 hectares, and only a few copra workers lived there permanently. During the totality, there were 85 scientists as well as their assistants on the atoll. The Sun was obscured by clouds during the eclipse and observations were not successful. In the northern part of New Zealand's North Island, the total eclipse occurred shortly after sunrise on May 31 local time. Although there were some clouds in the sky on the previous evening, the eclipse was seen successfully. In addition, scientists also launched rockets to obtain observation data from high altitude.

== Eclipse details ==
Shown below are two tables displaying details about this particular solar eclipse. The first table outlines times at which the Moon's penumbra or umbra attains the specific parameter, and the second table describes various other parameters pertaining to this eclipse.

May 30, 1965 Solar Eclipse Times
Event	Time (UTC)
First Penumbral External Contact	1965 May 30 at 18:42:27.7 UTC
First Umbral External Contact	1965 May 30 at 19:41:19.6 UTC
First Central Line	1965 May 30 at 19:42:27.9 UTC
First Umbral Internal Contact	1965 May 30 at 19:43:36.4 UTC
First Penumbral Internal Contact	1965 May 30 at 20:58:09.1 UTC
Equatorial Conjunction	1965 May 30 at 21:06:07.2 UTC
Ecliptic Conjunction	1965 May 30 at 21:13:07.3 UTC
Greatest Eclipse	1965 May 30 at 21:17:30.7 UTC
Greatest Duration	1965 May 30 at 21:22:56.7 UTC
Last Penumbral Internal Contact	1965 May 30 at 21:37:09.3 UTC
Last Umbral Internal Contact	1965 May 30 at 22:51:30.3 UTC
Last Central Line	1965 May 30 at 22:52:40.6 UTC
Last Umbral External Contact	1965 May 30 at 22:53:50.7 UTC
Last Penumbral External Contact	1965 May 30 at 23:52:34.5 UTC

May 30, 1965 Solar Eclipse Parameters
Parameter	Value
Eclipse Magnitude	1.05440
Eclipse Obscuration	1.11175
Gamma	−0.42251
Sun Right Ascension	04h30m07.4s
Sun Declination	+21°50'16.2"
Sun Semi-Diameter	15'46.4"
Sun Equatorial Horizontal Parallax	08.7"
Moon Right Ascension	04h30m34.5s
Moon Declination	+21°25'43.5"
Moon Semi-Diameter	16'22.9"
Moon Equatorial Horizontal Parallax	1°00'07.2"
ΔT	36.1 s

== Eclipse season ==
This eclipse is part of an eclipse season, a period, roughly every six months, when eclipses occur. Only two (or occasionally three) eclipse seasons occur each year, and each season lasts about 35 days and repeats just short of six months (173 days) later; thus two full eclipse seasons always occur each year. Either two or three eclipses happen each eclipse season. In the sequence below, each eclipse is separated by a fortnight.

Eclipse season of May–June 1965
May 30 Ascending node (new moon)	June 14 Descending node (full moon)
Total solar eclipse Solar Saros 127	Partial lunar eclipse Lunar Saros 139

== Related eclipses ==
=== Eclipses in 1965 ===
- A total solar eclipse on May 30.
- A partial lunar eclipse on June 14.
- An annular solar eclipse on November 23.
- A penumbral lunar eclipse on December 8.

=== Metonic ===
- Preceded by: Solar eclipse of August 11, 1961
- Followed by: Solar eclipse of March 18, 1969

=== Tzolkinex ===
- Preceded by: Solar eclipse of April 19, 1958
- Followed by: Solar eclipse of July 10, 1972

=== Half-Saros ===
- Preceded by: Lunar eclipse of May 24, 1956
- Followed by: Lunar eclipse of June 4, 1974

=== Tritos ===
- Preceded by: Solar eclipse of June 30, 1954
- Followed by: Solar eclipse of April 29, 1976

=== Solar Saros 127 ===
- Preceded by: Solar eclipse of May 20, 1947
- Followed by: Solar eclipse of June 11, 1983

=== Inex ===
- Preceded by: Solar eclipse of June 19, 1936
- Followed by: Solar eclipse of May 10, 1994

=== Triad ===
- Preceded by: Solar eclipse of July 29, 1878
- Followed by: Solar eclipse of March 30, 2052

=== Solar eclipses of 1964–1967 ===
This eclipse is a member of a semester series. An eclipse in a semester series of solar eclipses repeats approximately every 177 days and 4 hours (a semester) at alternating nodes of the Moon's orbit.

The partial solar eclipses on January 14, 1964 and July 9, 1964 occur in the previous lunar year eclipse set.

Solar eclipse series sets from 1964 to 1967
Ascending node			Descending node		
Saros	Map	Gamma	Saros	Map	Gamma
117	June 10, 1964 Partial	−1.1393	122	December 4, 1964 Partial	1.1193
127	May 30, 1965 Total	−0.4225	132	November 23, 1965 Annular	0.3906
137	May 20, 1966 Annular	0.3467	142	November 12, 1966 Total	−0.33
147	May 9, 1967 Partial	1.1422	152	November 2, 1967 Total (non-central)	1.0007

=== Saros 127 ===
This eclipse is a part of Saros series 127, repeating every 18 years, 11 days, and containing 82 events. The series started with a partial solar eclipse on October 10, 991 AD. It contains total eclipses from May 14, 1352 through August 15, 2091. There are no annular or hybrid eclipses in this set. The series ends at member 82 as a partial eclipse on March 21, 2452. Its eclipses are tabulated in three columns; every third eclipse in the same column is one exeligmos apart, so they all cast shadows over approximately the same parts of the Earth.

The longest duration of totality was produced by member 31 at 5 minutes, 40 seconds on August 30, 1532. All eclipses in this series occur at the Moon’s ascending node of orbit.

Series members 46–68 occur between 1801 and 2200:
46	47	48
February 21, 1803	March 4, 1821	March 15, 1839
49	50	51
March 25, 1857	April 6, 1875	April 16, 1893
52	53	54
April 28, 1911	May 9, 1929	May 20, 1947
55	56	57
May 30, 1965	June 11, 1983	June 21, 2001
58	59	60
July 2, 2019	July 13, 2037	July 24, 2055
61	62	63
August 3, 2073	August 15, 2091	August 26, 2109
64	65	66
September 6, 2127	September 16, 2145	September 28, 2163
67	68	
October 8, 2181	October 19, 2199	

=== Metonic series ===
The metonic series repeats eclipses every 19 years (6939.69 days), lasting about 5 cycles. Eclipses occur in nearly the same calendar date. In addition, the octon subseries repeats 1/5 of that or every 3.8 years (1387.94 days). All eclipses in this table occur at the Moon's ascending node.

22 eclipse events between January 5, 1935 and August 11, 2018
January 4–5	October 23–24	August 10–12	May 30–31	March 18–19
111	113	115	117	119
January 5, 1935		August 12, 1942	May 30, 1946	March 18, 1950
121	123	125	127	129
January 5, 1954	October 23, 1957	August 11, 1961	May 30, 1965	March 18, 1969
131	133	135	137	139
January 4, 1973	October 23, 1976	August 10, 1980	May 30, 1984	March 18, 1988
141	143	145	147	149
January 4, 1992	October 24, 1995	August 11, 1999	May 31, 2003	March 19, 2007
151	153	155		
January 4, 2011	October 23, 2014	August 11, 2018		

=== Tritos series ===
This eclipse is a part of a tritos cycle, repeating at alternating nodes every 135 synodic months (≈ 3986.63 days, or 11 years minus 1 month). Their appearance and longitude are irregular due to a lack of synchronization with the anomalistic month (period of perigee), but groupings of 3 tritos cycles (≈ 33 years minus 3 months) come close (≈ 434.044 anomalistic months), so eclipses are similar in these groupings.

Series members between 1801 and 2200
September 8, 1801 (Saros 112)	August 7, 1812 (Saros 113)	July 8, 1823 (Saros 114)	June 7, 1834 (Saros 115)	May 6, 1845 (Saros 116)
April 5, 1856 (Saros 117)	March 6, 1867 (Saros 118)	February 2, 1878 (Saros 119)	January 1, 1889 (Saros 120)	December 3, 1899 (Saros 121)
November 2, 1910 (Saros 122)	October 1, 1921 (Saros 123)	August 31, 1932 (Saros 124)	August 1, 1943 (Saros 125)	June 30, 1954 (Saros 126)
May 30, 1965 (Saros 127)	April 29, 1976 (Saros 128)	March 29, 1987 (Saros 129)	February 26, 1998 (Saros 130)	January 26, 2009 (Saros 131)
December 26, 2019 (Saros 132)	November 25, 2030 (Saros 133)	October 25, 2041 (Saros 134)	September 22, 2052 (Saros 135)	August 24, 2063 (Saros 136)
July 24, 2074 (Saros 137)	June 22, 2085 (Saros 138)	May 22, 2096 (Saros 139)	April 23, 2107 (Saros 140)	March 22, 2118 (Saros 141)
February 18, 2129 (Saros 142)	January 20, 2140 (Saros 143)	December 19, 2150 (Saros 144)	November 17, 2161 (Saros 145)	October 17, 2172 (Saros 146)
September 16, 2183 (Saros 147)	August 16, 2194 (Saros 148)			

=== Inex series ===
This eclipse is a part of the long period inex cycle, repeating at alternating nodes, every 358 synodic months (≈ 10,571.95 days, or 29 years minus 20 days). Their appearance and longitude are irregular due to a lack of synchronization with the anomalistic month (period of perigee). However, groupings of 3 inex cycles (≈ 87 years minus 2 months) comes close (≈ 1,151.02 anomalistic months), so eclipses are similar in these groupings.

Series members between 1801 and 2200
September 7, 1820 (Saros 122)	August 18, 1849 (Saros 123)	July 29, 1878 (Saros 124)
July 10, 1907 (Saros 125)	June 19, 1936 (Saros 126)	May 30, 1965 (Saros 127)
May 10, 1994 (Saros 128)	April 20, 2023 (Saros 129)	March 30, 2052 (Saros 130)
March 10, 2081 (Saros 131)	February 18, 2110 (Saros 132)	January 30, 2139 (Saros 133)
January 10, 2168 (Saros 134)	December 19, 2196 (Saros 135)	
