= Solar eclipse of May 9, 1929 =

Total eclipse

- Total eclipse
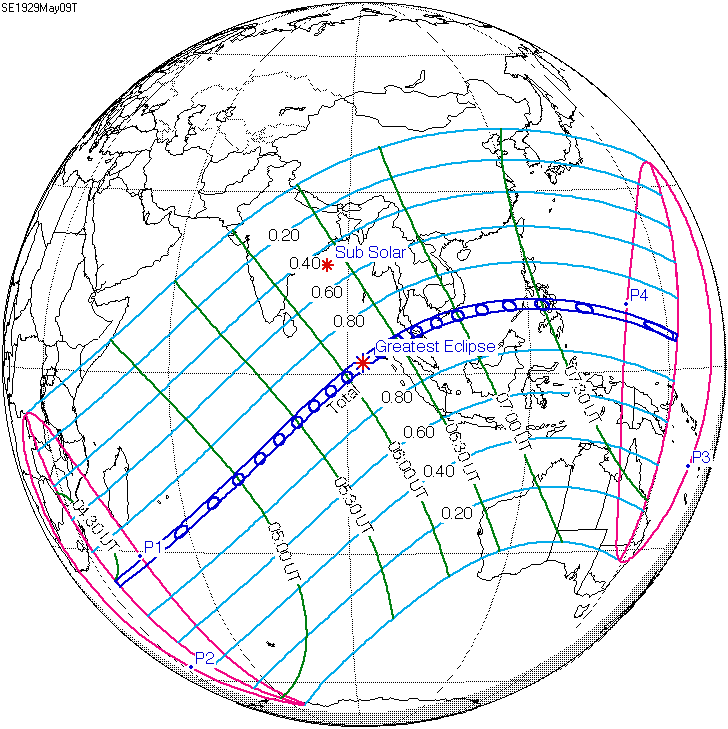
- Map
- Gamma: −0.2887
- Magnitude: 1.0562

Maximum eclipse
- Duration: 307 s (5 min 7 s)
- Coordinates: 1.6°N 92.7°E
- Max. width of band: 193 km (120 mi)

Times (UTC)
- Greatest eclipse: 6:10:34

References
- Saros: 127 (53 of 82)
- Catalog # (SE5000): 9349

A total solar eclipse occurred at the Moon's ascending node of orbit on Thursday, May 9, 1929, with a magnitude of 1.0562. A solar eclipse occurs when the Moon passes between Earth and the Sun, thereby totally or partly obscuring the image of the Sun for a viewer on Earth. A total solar eclipse occurs when the Moon's apparent diameter is larger than the Sun's, blocking all direct sunlight, turning day into darkness. Totality occurs in a narrow path across Earth's surface, with the partial solar eclipse visible over a surrounding region thousands of kilometres wide. Occurring about 1.7 days before perigee (on May 10, 1929, at 21:00 UTC), the Moon's apparent diameter was larger.

Totality was visible from Dutch East Indies (today's Indonesia), Federated Malay States (now belonging to Malaysia), Siam (name changed to Thailand later), French Indochina (the part now belonging to Vietnam), Spratly Islands, Philippines, and South Seas Mandate in Japan (the part now belonging to FS Micronesia). A partial eclipse was visible for parts of Southeast Africa, South Asia, Southeast Asia, East Asia, and Australia.

== Observations ==
A team of British and German scientists observed the total eclipse in Pattani province in southern Siam. King Rama VII and Queen Rambai Barni also visited the observation camp set up by foreign scientists and observed the eclipse together in Pattani. This was the last time that Siam (Thailand) received a large-scale solar eclipse observation team so far. The other teams Thailand received later, including the American team for the total solar eclipse of June 20, 1955 were much smaller.

== Eclipse details ==
Shown below are two tables displaying details about this particular solar eclipse. The first table outlines times at which the Moon's penumbra or umbra attains the specific parameter, and the second table describes various other parameters pertaining to this eclipse.

May 9, 1929 Solar Eclipse Times
Event	Time (UTC)
First Penumbral External Contact	1929 May 9 at 03:32:58.0 UTC
First Umbral External Contact	1929 May 9 at 04:29:32.5 UTC
First Central Line	1929 May 9 at 04:30:38.2 UTC
First Umbral Internal Contact	1929 May 9 at 04:31:43.9 UTC
First Penumbral Internal Contact	1929 May 9 at 05:32:55.2 UTC
Equatorial Conjunction	1929 May 9 at 05:58:29.8 UTC
Ecliptic Conjunction	1929 May 9 at 06:07:34.8 UTC
Greatest Eclipse	1929 May 9 at 06:10:34.1 UTC
Greatest Duration	1929 May 9 at 06:17:47.1 UTC
Last Penumbral Internal Contact	1929 May 9 at 06:48:30.3 UTC
Last Umbral Internal Contact	1929 May 9 at 07:49:29.9 UTC
Last Central Line	1929 May 9 at 07:50:37.4 UTC
Last Umbral External Contact	1929 May 9 at 07:51:44.7 UTC
Last Penumbral External Contact	1929 May 9 at 08:48:11.5 UTC

May 9, 1929 Solar Eclipse Parameters
Parameter	Value
Eclipse Magnitude	1.05622
Eclipse Obscuration	1.11560
Gamma	−0.28869
Sun Right Ascension	03h02m38.7s
Sun Declination	+17°14'10.1"
Sun Semi-Diameter	15'50.3"
Sun Equatorial Horizontal Parallax	08.7"
Moon Right Ascension	03h03m05.7s
Moon Declination	+16°58'00.8"
Moon Semi-Diameter	16'27.7"
Moon Equatorial Horizontal Parallax	1°00'24.9"
ΔT	24.0 s

== Eclipse season ==
This eclipse is part of an eclipse season, a period, roughly every six months, when eclipses occur. Only two (or occasionally three) eclipse seasons occur each year, and each season lasts about 35 days and repeats just short of six months (173 days) later; thus two full eclipse seasons always occur each year. Either two or three eclipses happen each eclipse season. In the sequence below, each eclipse is separated by a fortnight.

Eclipse season of May 1929
May 9 Ascending node (new moon)	May 23 Descending node (full moon)
Total solar eclipse Solar Saros 127	Penumbral lunar eclipse Lunar Saros 139

== Related eclipses ==
=== Eclipses in 1929 ===
- A total solar eclipse on May 9.
- A penumbral lunar eclipse on May 23.
- An annular solar eclipse on November 1.
- A penumbral lunar eclipse on November 17.

=== Metonic ===
- Preceded by: Solar eclipse of July 20, 1925
- Followed by: Solar eclipse of February 24, 1933

=== Tzolkinex ===
- Preceded by: Solar eclipse of March 28, 1922
- Followed by: Solar eclipse of June 19, 1936

=== Half-Saros ===
- Preceded by: Lunar eclipse of May 3, 1920
- Followed by: Lunar eclipse of May 14, 1938

=== Tritos ===
- Preceded by: Solar eclipse of June 8, 1918
- Followed by: Solar eclipse of April 7, 1940

=== Solar Saros 127 ===
- Preceded by: Solar eclipse of April 28, 1911
- Followed by: Solar eclipse of May 20, 1947

=== Inex ===
- Preceded by: Solar eclipse of May 28, 1900
- Followed by: Solar eclipse of April 19, 1958

=== Triad ===
- Preceded by: Solar eclipse of July 8, 1842
- Followed by: Solar eclipse of March 9, 2016

=== Solar eclipses of 1928–1931 ===
This eclipse is a member of a semester series. An eclipse in a semester series of solar eclipses repeats approximately every 177 days and 4 hours (a semester) at alternating nodes of the Moon's orbit.

The partial solar eclipse on June 17, 1928 occurs in the previous lunar year eclipse set, and the partial solar eclipse on September 12, 1931 occurs in the next lunar year eclipse set.

Solar eclipse series sets from 1928 to 1931
Ascending node			Descending node		
Saros	Map	Gamma	Saros	Map	Gamma
117	May 19, 1928 Total (non-central)	1.0048	122	November 12, 1928 Partial	1.0861
127	May 9, 1929 Total	−0.2887	132	November 1, 1929 Annular	0.3514
137	April 28, 1930 Hybrid	0.473	142	October 21, 1930 Total	−0.3804
147	April 18, 1931 Partial	1.2643	152	October 11, 1931 Partial	−1.0607

=== Saros 127 ===
This eclipse is a part of Saros series 127, repeating every 18 years, 11 days, and containing 82 events. The series started with a partial solar eclipse on October 10, 991 AD. It contains total eclipses from May 14, 1352 through August 15, 2091. There are no annular or hybrid eclipses in this set. The series ends at member 82 as a partial eclipse on March 21, 2452. Its eclipses are tabulated in three columns; every third eclipse in the same column is one exeligmos apart, so they all cast shadows over approximately the same parts of the Earth.

The longest duration of totality was produced by member 31 at 5 minutes, 40 seconds on August 30, 1532. All eclipses in this series occur at the Moon’s ascending node of orbit.

Series members 46–68 occur between 1801 and 2200:
46	47	48
February 21, 1803	March 4, 1821	March 15, 1839
49	50	51
March 25, 1857	April 6, 1875	April 16, 1893
52	53	54
April 28, 1911	May 9, 1929	May 20, 1947
55	56	57
May 30, 1965	June 11, 1983	June 21, 2001
58	59	60
July 2, 2019	July 13, 2037	July 24, 2055
61	62	63
August 3, 2073	August 15, 2091	August 26, 2109
64	65	66
September 6, 2127	September 16, 2145	September 28, 2163
67	68	
October 8, 2181	October 19, 2199	

=== Metonic series ===
The metonic series repeats eclipses every 19 years (6939.69 days), lasting about 5 cycles. Eclipses occur in nearly the same calendar date. In addition, the octon subseries repeats 1/5 of that or every 3.8 years (1387.94 days). All eclipses in this table occur at the Moon's ascending node.

22 eclipse events between December 13, 1898 and July 20, 1982
December 13–14	October 1–2	July 20–21	May 9	February 24–25
111	113	115	117	119
December 13, 1898		July 21, 1906	May 9, 1910	February 25, 1914
121	123	125	127	129
December 14, 1917	October 1, 1921	July 20, 1925	May 9, 1929	February 24, 1933
131	133	135	137	139
December 13, 1936	October 1, 1940	July 20, 1944	May 9, 1948	February 25, 1952
141	143	145	147	149
December 14, 1955	October 2, 1959	July 20, 1963	May 9, 1967	February 25, 1971
151	153	155		
December 13, 1974	October 2, 1978	July 20, 1982		

=== Tritos series ===
This eclipse is a part of a tritos cycle, repeating at alternating nodes every 135 synodic months (≈ 3986.63 days, or 11 years minus 1 month). Their appearance and longitude are irregular due to a lack of synchronization with the anomalistic month (period of perigee), but groupings of 3 tritos cycles (≈ 33 years minus 3 months) come close (≈ 434.044 anomalistic months), so eclipses are similar in these groupings.

Series members between 1801 and 2200
April 14, 1809 (Saros 116)	March 14, 1820 (Saros 117)	February 12, 1831 (Saros 118)	January 11, 1842 (Saros 119)	December 11, 1852 (Saros 120)
November 11, 1863 (Saros 121)	October 10, 1874 (Saros 122)	September 8, 1885 (Saros 123)	August 9, 1896 (Saros 124)	July 10, 1907 (Saros 125)
June 8, 1918 (Saros 126)	May 9, 1929 (Saros 127)	April 7, 1940 (Saros 128)	March 7, 1951 (Saros 129)	February 5, 1962 (Saros 130)
January 4, 1973 (Saros 131)	December 4, 1983 (Saros 132)	November 3, 1994 (Saros 133)	October 3, 2005 (Saros 134)	September 1, 2016 (Saros 135)
August 2, 2027 (Saros 136)	July 2, 2038 (Saros 137)	May 31, 2049 (Saros 138)	April 30, 2060 (Saros 139)	March 31, 2071 (Saros 140)
February 27, 2082 (Saros 141)	January 27, 2093 (Saros 142)	December 29, 2103 (Saros 143)	November 27, 2114 (Saros 144)	October 26, 2125 (Saros 145)
September 26, 2136 (Saros 146)	August 26, 2147 (Saros 147)	July 25, 2158 (Saros 148)	June 25, 2169 (Saros 149)	May 24, 2180 (Saros 150)
April 23, 2191 (Saros 151)

=== Inex series ===
This eclipse is a part of the long period inex cycle, repeating at alternating nodes, every 358 synodic months (≈ 10,571.95 days, or 29 years minus 20 days). Their appearance and longitude are irregular due to a lack of synchronization with the anomalistic month (period of perigee). However, groupings of 3 inex cycles (≈ 87 years minus 2 months) comes close (≈ 1,151.02 anomalistic months), so eclipses are similar in these groupings.

Series members between 1801 and 2200
July 27, 1813 (Saros 123)	July 8, 1842 (Saros 124)	June 18, 1871 (Saros 125)
May 28, 1900 (Saros 126)	May 9, 1929 (Saros 127)	April 19, 1958 (Saros 128)
March 29, 1987 (Saros 129)	March 9, 2016 (Saros 130)	February 16, 2045 (Saros 131)
January 27, 2074 (Saros 132)	January 8, 2103 (Saros 133)	December 19, 2131 (Saros 134)
November 27, 2160 (Saros 135)	November 8, 2189 (Saros 136)	
