= Solar eclipse of December 25, 1954 =

20th-century annular solar eclipse

- Annular eclipse
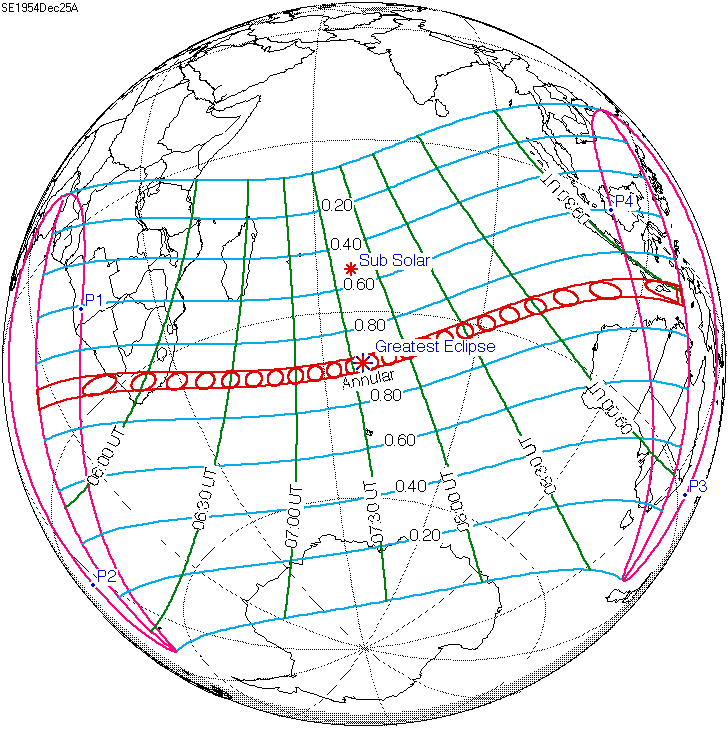
- Map
- Gamma: −0.2576
- Magnitude: 0.9323

Maximum eclipse
- Duration: 459 s (7 min 39 s)
- Coordinates: 38.4°S 68.2°E
- Max. width of band: 262 km (163 mi)

Times (UTC)
- Greatest eclipse: 7:36:42

References
- Saros: 131 (47 of 70)
- Catalog # (SE5000): 9409

An annular solar eclipse occurred at the Moon's ascending node of orbit on Saturday, December 25, 1954 (also known as "The Christmas 1954 solar eclipse"), with a magnitude of 0.9323. It was the first solar eclipse to fall on Christmas since 1935, and the last until 2000. A solar eclipse occurs when the Moon passes between Earth and the Sun, thereby totally or partly obscuring the image of the Sun for a viewer on Earth. An annular solar eclipse occurs when the Moon's apparent diameter is smaller than the Sun's, blocking most of the Sun's light and causing the Sun to look like an annulus (ring). An annular eclipse appears as a partial eclipse over a region of the Earth thousands of kilometers wide. Occurring about 4.9 days after apogee (on December 21, 1954, at 8:50 UTC), the Moon's apparent diameter was smaller.

Annularity was visible from the southwestern tip of South West Africa (Now Namibia), Union of South Africa (Now South Africa), Ashmore and Cartier Islands except Cartier Island, Indonesia and Portuguese Timor (Now East Timor). A partial eclipse was visible for parts of Southern Africa, Antarctica, Southeast Asia, and Australia.

== Eclipse details ==
Shown below are two tables displaying details about this particular solar eclipse. The first table outlines times at which the Moon's penumbra or umbra attains the specific parameter, and the second table describes various other parameters pertaining to this eclipse.

December 25, 1954 Solar Eclipse Times
Event	Time (UTC)
First Penumbral External Contact	1954 December 25 at 04:35:22.0 UTC
First Umbral External Contact	1954 December 25 at 05:40:42.2 UTC
First Central Line	1954 December 25 at 05:43:40.3 UTC
First Umbral Internal Contact	1954 December 25 at 05:46:38.6 UTC
First Penumbral Internal Contact	1954 December 25 at 06:56:43.3 UTC
Greatest Duration	1954 December 25 at 07:29:49.2 UTC
Equatorial Conjunction	1954 December 25 at 07:32:58.2 UTC
Ecliptic Conjunction	1954 December 25 at 07:33:39.3 UTC
Greatest Eclipse	1954 December 25 at 07:36:42.4 UTC
Last Penumbral Internal Contact	1954 December 25 at 08:16:48.3 UTC
Last Umbral Internal Contact	1954 December 25 at 09:26:50.4 UTC
Last Central Line	1954 December 25 at 09:29:46.5 UTC
Last Umbral External Contact	1954 December 25 at 09:32:42.2 UTC
Last Penumbral External Contact	1954 December 25 at 10:37:59.4 UTC

December 25, 1954 Solar Eclipse Parameters
Parameter	Value
Eclipse Magnitude	0.93233
Eclipse Obscuration	0.86925
Gamma	−0.25762
Sun Right Ascension	18h12m59.7s
Sun Declination	-23°24'41.6"
Sun Semi-Diameter	16'15.7"
Sun Equatorial Horizontal Parallax	08.9"
Moon Right Ascension	18h13m07.2s
Moon Declination	-23°38'40.4"
Moon Semi-Diameter	14'56.4"
Moon Equatorial Horizontal Parallax	0°54'49.7"
ΔT	31.1 s

== Eclipse season ==
This eclipse is part of an eclipse season, a period, roughly every six months, when eclipses occur. Only two (or occasionally three) eclipse seasons occur each year, and each season lasts about 35 days and repeats just short of six months (173 days) later; thus two full eclipse seasons always occur each year. Either two or three eclipses happen each eclipse season. In the sequence below, each eclipse is separated by a fortnight.

Eclipse season of December 1954–January 1955
December 25 Ascending node (new moon)	January 8 Descending node (full moon)
Annular solar eclipse Solar Saros 131	Penumbral lunar eclipse Lunar Saros 143

== Related eclipses ==
=== Eclipses in 1954 ===
- An annular solar eclipse on January 5.
- A total lunar eclipse on January 19.
- A total solar eclipse on June 30.
- A partial lunar eclipse on July 16.
- An annular solar eclipse on December 25.

=== Metonic ===
- Preceded by: Solar eclipse of March 7, 1951
- Followed by: Solar eclipse of October 12, 1958

=== Tzolkinex ===
- Preceded by: Solar eclipse of November 12, 1947
- Followed by: Solar eclipse of February 5, 1962

=== Half-Saros ===
- Preceded by: Lunar eclipse of December 19, 1945
- Followed by: Lunar eclipse of December 30, 1963

=== Tritos ===
- Preceded by: Solar eclipse of January 25, 1944
- Followed by: Solar eclipse of November 23, 1965

=== Solar Saros 131 ===
- Preceded by: Solar eclipse of December 13, 1936
- Followed by: Solar eclipse of January 4, 1973

=== Inex ===
- Preceded by: Solar eclipse of January 14, 1926
- Followed by: Solar eclipse of December 4, 1983

=== Triad ===
- Preceded by: Solar eclipse of February 23, 1868
- Followed by: Solar eclipse of October 25, 2041

=== Solar eclipses of 1953–1956 ===
This eclipse is a member of a semester series. An eclipse in a semester series of solar eclipses repeats approximately every 177 days and 4 hours (a semester) at alternating nodes of the Moon's orbit.

The partial solar eclipses on February 14, 1953 and August 9, 1953 occur in the previous lunar year eclipse set.

Solar eclipse series sets from 1953 to 1956
Descending node			Ascending node		
Saros	Map	Gamma	Saros	Map	Gamma
116	July 11, 1953 Partial	1.4388	121	January 5, 1954 Annular	−0.9296
126	June 30, 1954 Total	0.6135	131	December 25, 1954 Annular	−0.2576
136	June 20, 1955 Total	−0.1528	141	December 14, 1955 Annular	0.4266
146	June 8, 1956 Total	−0.8934	151	December 2, 1956 Partial	1.0923

=== Saros 131 ===
This eclipse is a part of Saros series 131, repeating every 18 years, 11 days, and containing 70 events. The series started with a partial solar eclipse on August 1, 1125. It contains total eclipses from March 27, 1522 through May 30, 1612; hybrid eclipses from June 10, 1630 through July 24, 1702; and annular eclipses from August 4, 1720 through June 18, 2243. The series ends at member 70 as a partial eclipse on September 2, 2369. Its eclipses are tabulated in three columns; every third eclipse in the same column is one exeligmos apart, so they all cast shadows over approximately the same parts of the Earth.

The longest duration of totality was produced by member 28 at 58 seconds on May 30, 1612, and the longest duration of annularity was produced by member 50 at 7 minutes, 54 seconds on January 26, 2009. All eclipses in this series occur at the Moon’s ascending node of orbit.

Series members 39–60 occur between 1801 and 2200:
39	40	41
September 28, 1810	October 9, 1828	October 20, 1846
42	43	44
October 30, 1864	November 10, 1882	November 22, 1900
45	46	47
December 3, 1918	December 13, 1936	December 25, 1954
48	49	50
January 4, 1973	January 15, 1991	January 26, 2009
51	52	53
February 6, 2027	February 16, 2045	February 28, 2063
54	55	56
March 10, 2081	March 21, 2099	April 2, 2117
57	58	59
April 13, 2135	April 23, 2153	May 5, 2171
60
May 15, 2189

=== Metonic series ===
The metonic series repeats eclipses every 19 years (6939.69 days), lasting about 5 cycles. Eclipses occur in nearly the same calendar date. In addition, the octon subseries repeats 1/5 of that or every 3.8 years (1387.94 days). All eclipses in this table occur at the Moon's ascending node.

22 eclipse events between December 24, 1916 and July 31, 2000
December 24–25	October 12	July 31–August 1	May 19–20	March 7
111	113	115	117	119
December 24, 1916		July 31, 1924	May 19, 1928	March 7, 1932
121	123	125	127	129
December 25, 1935	October 12, 1939	August 1, 1943	May 20, 1947	March 7, 1951
131	133	135	137	139
December 25, 1954	October 12, 1958	July 31, 1962	May 20, 1966	March 7, 1970
141	143	145	147	149
December 24, 1973	October 12, 1977	July 31, 1981	May 19, 1985	March 7, 1989
151	153	155		
December 24, 1992	October 12, 1996	July 31, 2000		

=== Tritos series ===
This eclipse is a part of a tritos cycle, repeating at alternating nodes every 135 synodic months (≈ 3986.63 days, or 11 years minus 1 month). Their appearance and longitude are irregular due to a lack of synchronization with the anomalistic month (period of perigee), but groupings of 3 tritos cycles (≈ 33 years minus 3 months) come close (≈ 434.044 anomalistic months), so eclipses are similar in these groupings.

Series members between 1801 and 2200
March 4, 1802 (Saros 117)	February 1, 1813 (Saros 118)	January 1, 1824 (Saros 119)	November 30, 1834 (Saros 120)	October 30, 1845 (Saros 121)
September 29, 1856 (Saros 122)	August 29, 1867 (Saros 123)	July 29, 1878 (Saros 124)	June 28, 1889 (Saros 125)	May 28, 1900 (Saros 126)
April 28, 1911 (Saros 127)	March 28, 1922 (Saros 128)	February 24, 1933 (Saros 129)	January 25, 1944 (Saros 130)	December 25, 1954 (Saros 131)
November 23, 1965 (Saros 132)	October 23, 1976 (Saros 133)	September 23, 1987 (Saros 134)	August 22, 1998 (Saros 135)	July 22, 2009 (Saros 136)
June 21, 2020 (Saros 137)	May 21, 2031 (Saros 138)	April 20, 2042 (Saros 139)	March 20, 2053 (Saros 140)	February 17, 2064 (Saros 141)
January 16, 2075 (Saros 142)	December 16, 2085 (Saros 143)	November 15, 2096 (Saros 144)	October 16, 2107 (Saros 145)	September 15, 2118 (Saros 146)
August 15, 2129 (Saros 147)	July 14, 2140 (Saros 148)	June 14, 2151 (Saros 149)	May 14, 2162 (Saros 150)	April 12, 2173 (Saros 151)
March 12, 2184 (Saros 152)	February 10, 2195 (Saros 153)			

=== Inex series ===
This eclipse is a part of the long period inex cycle, repeating at alternating nodes, every 358 synodic months (≈ 10,571.95 days, or 29 years minus 20 days). Their appearance and longitude are irregular due to a lack of synchronization with the anomalistic month (period of perigee). However, groupings of 3 inex cycles (≈ 87 years minus 2 months) comes close (≈ 1,151.02 anomalistic months), so eclipses are similar in these groupings.

Series members between 1801 and 2200
April 4, 1810 (Saros 126)	March 15, 1839 (Saros 127)	February 23, 1868 (Saros 128)
February 1, 1897 (Saros 129)	January 14, 1926 (Saros 130)	December 25, 1954 (Saros 131)
December 4, 1983 (Saros 132)	November 13, 2012 (Saros 133)	October 25, 2041 (Saros 134)
October 4, 2070 (Saros 135)	September 14, 2099 (Saros 136)	August 25, 2128 (Saros 137)
August 5, 2157 (Saros 138)	July 16, 2186 (Saros 139)	
