= Solar eclipse of April 28, 1911 =

Total eclipse

- Total eclipse
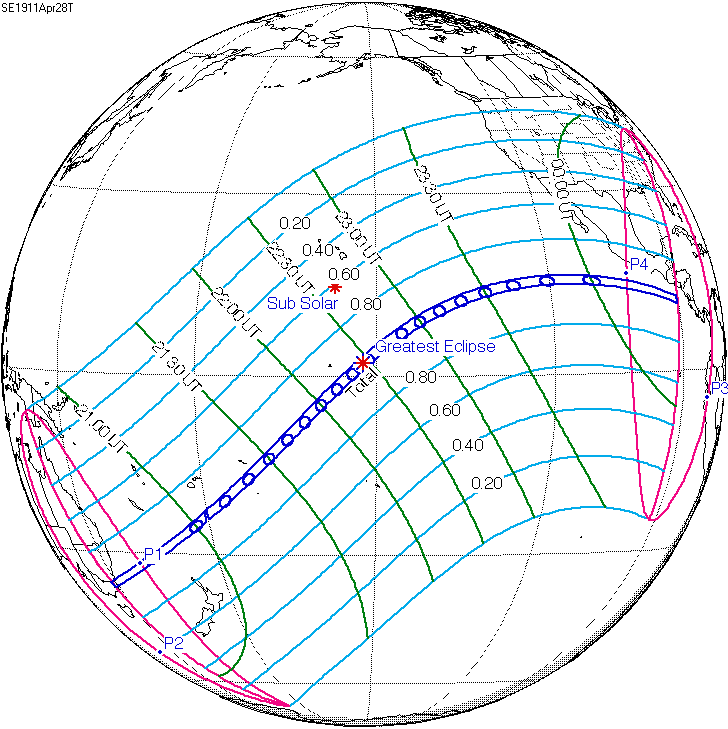
- Map
- Gamma: −0.2294
- Magnitude: 1.0562

Maximum eclipse
- Duration: 297 s (4 min 57 s)
- Coordinates: 1.9°N 151.9°W
- Max. width of band: 190 km (120 mi)

Times (UTC)
- Greatest eclipse: 22:27:22

References
- Saros: 127 (52 of 82)
- Catalog # (SE5000): 9306

A total solar eclipse occurred at the Moon's ascending node of orbit between Friday, April 28 and Saturday, April 29, 1911, with a magnitude of 1.0562. A solar eclipse occurs when the Moon passes between Earth and the Sun, thereby totally or partly obscuring the image of the Sun for a viewer on Earth. A total solar eclipse occurs when the Moon's apparent diameter is larger than the Sun's, blocking all direct sunlight, turning day into darkness. Totality occurs in a narrow path across Earth's surface, with the partial solar eclipse visible over a surrounding region thousands of kilometres wide. Occurring about 1.4 days before perigee (on April 30, 1911, at 9:00 UTC), the Moon's apparent diameter was larger.

Totality was visible from southeastern tip of Australia, Tonga, American Samoa and the Cook Islands. A partial eclipse was visible for parts of Oceania, southern North America, Central America, and the western Caribbean.

== Observations ==
A team of Stonyhurst College, England and Saint Ignatius' College, Riverview, New South Wales made observations in Vavaʻu Islands, Tonga. Members of Stonyhurst College departed from Tilbury, England by ship on February 3 and arrived in Sydney on March 16. The team later departed from Sydney on March 25 and arrived in Vavaʻu on April 2. All the instruments were shipped ashore on April 5. The weather was clear for the next few days, but heavy rain showers fell almost every day starting from April 10. The southeast wind starting on April 26 brought thick and large cirrus clouds. On April 28, one day before the eclipse, there were many clouds, which lasted until the morning of April 29. On April 29, the eclipse day, the sky cleared before the first contact (beginning of the partial phase). Afterwards, some cumulus clouds passed through at first, and the weather remained relatively good. During the totality, weather conditions were good in Neiafu, but some areas about 2 miles (3.2 km) away were affected by cirrostratus clouds, and the sun was not visible until 90 seconds before the third contact (end of the total phase). During the eclipse, there was almost no sound on the island except the chirping of crickets, because the government told the local people to keep quiet and not to light fires to avoid creating smoke and disturbing the observations. The team shipped the instruments back on May 2, and the team members departed the island on May 4. They first arrived in Suva, capital of the Colony of Fiji on May 6, and departed again on May 11 and arrived in Sydney on May 17. The British in charge boarded the ship with the instruments leaving Sydney on June 10 and arriving in Tilbury on July 23.

== Eclipse details ==
Shown below are two tables displaying details about this particular solar eclipse. The first table outlines times at which the Moon's penumbra or umbra attains the specific parameter, and the second table describes various other parameters pertaining to this eclipse.

April 28, 1911 Solar Eclipse Times
Event	Time (UTC)
First Penumbral External Contact	1911 April 28 at 19:49:01.8 UTC
First Umbral External Contact	1911 April 28 at 20:44:54.8 UTC
First Central Line	1911 April 28 at 20:45:58.7 UTC
First Umbral Internal Contact	1911 April 28 at 20:47:02.6 UTC
First Penumbral Internal Contact	1911 April 28 at 21:45:34.0 UTC
Equatorial Conjunction	1911 April 28 at 22:16:23.0 UTC
Ecliptic Conjunction	1911 April 28 at 22:24:59.5 UTC
Greatest Eclipse	1911 April 28 at 22:27:21.8 UTC
Greatest Duration	1911 April 28 at 22:34:25.8 UTC
Last Penumbral Internal Contact	1911 April 28 at 23:09:25.1 UTC
Last Umbral Internal Contact	1911 April 29 at 00:07:45.8 UTC
Last Central Line	1911 April 29 at 00:08:51.3 UTC
Last Umbral External Contact	1911 April 29 at 00:09:56.8 UTC
Last Penumbral External Contact	1911 April 29 at 01:05:42.7 UTC

April 28, 1911 Solar Eclipse Parameters
Parameter	Value
Eclipse Magnitude	1.05617
Eclipse Obscuration	1.11549
Gamma	−0.22939
Sun Right Ascension	02h20m34.5s
Sun Declination	+14°01'17.3"
Sun Semi-Diameter	15'52.8"
Sun Equatorial Horizontal Parallax	08.7"
Moon Right Ascension	02h20m58.3s
Moon Declination	+13°48'41.7"
Moon Semi-Diameter	16'29.9"
Moon Equatorial Horizontal Parallax	1°00'33.0"
ΔT	12.1 s

== Eclipse season ==
This eclipse is part of an eclipse season, a period, roughly every six months, when eclipses occur. Only two (or occasionally three) eclipse seasons occur each year, and each season lasts about 35 days and repeats just short of six months (173 days) later; thus two full eclipse seasons always occur each year. Either two or three eclipses happen each eclipse season. In the sequence below, each eclipse is separated by a fortnight.

Eclipse season of April–May 1911
April 28 Ascending node (new moon)	May 13 Descending node (full moon)
Total solar eclipse Solar Saros 127	Penumbral lunar eclipse Lunar Saros 139

== Related eclipses ==
=== Eclipses in 1911 ===
- A total solar eclipse on April 28.
- A penumbral lunar eclipse on May 13.
- An annular solar eclipse on October 22.
- A penumbral lunar eclipse on November 6.

=== Metonic ===
- Preceded by: Solar eclipse of July 10, 1907
- Followed by: Solar eclipse of February 14, 1915

=== Tzolkinex ===
- Preceded by: Solar eclipse of March 17, 1904
- Followed by: Solar eclipse of June 8, 1918

=== Half-Saros ===
- Preceded by: Lunar eclipse of April 22, 1902
- Followed by: Lunar eclipse of May 3, 1920

=== Tritos ===
- Preceded by: Solar eclipse of May 28, 1900
- Followed by: Solar eclipse of March 28, 1922

=== Solar Saros 127 ===
- Preceded by: Solar eclipse of April 16, 1893
- Followed by: Solar eclipse of May 9, 1929

=== Inex ===
- Preceded by: Solar eclipse of May 17, 1882
- Followed by: Solar eclipse of April 7, 1940

=== Triad ===
- Preceded by: Solar eclipse of June 26, 1824
- Followed by: Solar eclipse of February 26, 1998

=== Solar eclipses of 1910–1913 ===
This eclipse is a member of a semester series. An eclipse in a semester series of solar eclipses repeats approximately every 177 days and 4 hours (a semester) at alternating nodes of the Moon's orbit.

The partial solar eclipse on August 31, 1913 occurs in the next lunar year eclipse set.

Solar eclipse series sets from 1910 to 1913
Ascending node			Descending node		
Saros	Map	Gamma	Saros	Map	Gamma
117	May 9, 1910 Total	−0.9437	122	November 2, 1910 Partial	1.0603
127	April 28, 1911 Total	−0.2294	132	October 22, 1911 Annular	0.3224
137	April 17, 1912 Hybrid	0.528	142	October 10, 1912 Total	−0.4149
147	April 6, 1913 Partial	1.3147	152	September 30, 1913 Partial	−1.1005

=== Saros 127 ===
This eclipse is a part of Saros series 127, repeating every 18 years, 11 days, and containing 82 events. The series started with a partial solar eclipse on October 10, 991 AD. It contains total eclipses from May 14, 1352 through August 15, 2091. There are no annular or hybrid eclipses in this set. The series ends at member 82 as a partial eclipse on March 21, 2452. Its eclipses are tabulated in three columns; every third eclipse in the same column is one exeligmos apart, so they all cast shadows over approximately the same parts of the Earth.

The longest duration of totality was produced by member 31 at 5 minutes, 40 seconds on August 30, 1532. All eclipses in this series occur at the Moon’s ascending node of orbit.

Series members 46–68 occur between 1801 and 2200:
46	47	48
February 21, 1803	March 4, 1821	March 15, 1839
49	50	51
March 25, 1857	April 6, 1875	April 16, 1893
52	53	54
April 28, 1911	May 9, 1929	May 20, 1947
55	56	57
May 30, 1965	June 11, 1983	June 21, 2001
58	59	60
July 2, 2019	July 13, 2037	July 24, 2055
61	62	63
August 3, 2073	August 15, 2091	August 26, 2109
64	65	66
September 6, 2127	September 16, 2145	September 28, 2163
67	68	
October 8, 2181	October 19, 2199	

=== Metonic series ===
The metonic series repeats eclipses every 19 years (6939.69 days), lasting about 5 cycles. Eclipses occur in nearly the same calendar date. In addition, the octon subseries repeats 1/5 of that or every 3.8 years (1387.94 days). All eclipses in this table occur at the Moon's ascending node.

22 eclipse events between December 2, 1880 and July 9, 1964
December 2–3	September 20–21	July 9–10	April 26–28	February 13–14
111	113	115	117	119
December 2, 1880		July 9, 1888	April 26, 1892	February 13, 1896
121	123	125	127	129
December 3, 1899	September 21, 1903	July 10, 1907	April 28, 1911	February 14, 1915
131	133	135	137	139
December 3, 1918	September 21, 1922	July 9, 1926	April 28, 1930	February 14, 1934
141	143	145	147	149
December 2, 1937	September 21, 1941	July 9, 1945	April 28, 1949	February 14, 1953
151	153	155		
December 2, 1956	September 20, 1960	July 9, 1964		

=== Tritos series ===
This eclipse is a part of a tritos cycle, repeating at alternating nodes every 135 synodic months (≈ 3986.63 days, or 11 years minus 1 month). Their appearance and longitude are irregular due to a lack of synchronization with the anomalistic month (period of perigee), but groupings of 3 tritos cycles (≈ 33 years minus 3 months) come close (≈ 434.044 anomalistic months), so eclipses are similar in these groupings.

Series members between 1801 and 2200
March 4, 1802 (Saros 117)	February 1, 1813 (Saros 118)	January 1, 1824 (Saros 119)	November 30, 1834 (Saros 120)	October 30, 1845 (Saros 121)
September 29, 1856 (Saros 122)	August 29, 1867 (Saros 123)	July 29, 1878 (Saros 124)	June 28, 1889 (Saros 125)	May 28, 1900 (Saros 126)
April 28, 1911 (Saros 127)	March 28, 1922 (Saros 128)	February 24, 1933 (Saros 129)	January 25, 1944 (Saros 130)	December 25, 1954 (Saros 131)
November 23, 1965 (Saros 132)	October 23, 1976 (Saros 133)	September 23, 1987 (Saros 134)	August 22, 1998 (Saros 135)	July 22, 2009 (Saros 136)
June 21, 2020 (Saros 137)	May 21, 2031 (Saros 138)	April 20, 2042 (Saros 139)	March 20, 2053 (Saros 140)	February 17, 2064 (Saros 141)
January 16, 2075 (Saros 142)	December 16, 2085 (Saros 143)	November 15, 2096 (Saros 144)	October 16, 2107 (Saros 145)	September 15, 2118 (Saros 146)
August 15, 2129 (Saros 147)	July 14, 2140 (Saros 148)	June 14, 2151 (Saros 149)	May 14, 2162 (Saros 150)	April 12, 2173 (Saros 151)
March 12, 2184 (Saros 152)	February 10, 2195 (Saros 153)			

=== Inex series ===
This eclipse is a part of the long period inex cycle, repeating at alternating nodes, every 358 synodic months (≈ 10,571.95 days, or 29 years minus 20 days). Their appearance and longitude are irregular due to a lack of synchronization with the anomalistic month (period of perigee). However, groupings of 3 inex cycles (≈ 87 years minus 2 months) comes close (≈ 1,151.02 anomalistic months), so eclipses are similar in these groupings.

Series members between 1801 and 2200
June 26, 1824 (Saros 124)	June 6, 1853 (Saros 125)	May 17, 1882 (Saros 126)
April 28, 1911 (Saros 127)	April 7, 1940 (Saros 128)	March 18, 1969 (Saros 129)
February 26, 1998 (Saros 130)	February 6, 2027 (Saros 131)	January 16, 2056 (Saros 132)
December 27, 2084 (Saros 133)	December 8, 2113 (Saros 134)	November 17, 2142 (Saros 135)
October 29, 2171 (Saros 136)	October 9, 2200 (Saros 137)	

== See also ==
- HMAS Encounter (1902)#Operational history
