= Solar eclipse of March 21, 2099 =

Future annular solar eclipse

- Annular eclipse
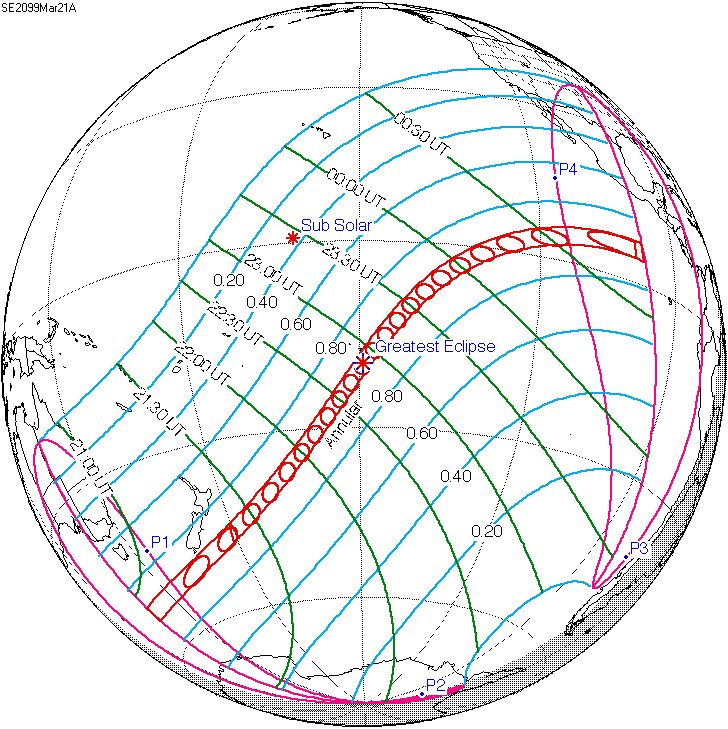
- Map
- Gamma: −0.4016
- Magnitude: 0.93

Maximum eclipse
- Duration: 452 s (7 min 32 s)
- Coordinates: 20°S 149°W
- Max. width of band: 275 km (171 mi)

Times (UTC)
- Greatest eclipse: 22:54:32

References
- Saros: 131 (55 of 70)
- Catalog # (SE5000): 9731

An annular solar eclipse will occur at the Moon's ascending node of orbit between Saturday, March 21 and Sunday, March 22, 2099, with a magnitude of 0.93. A solar eclipse occurs when the Moon passes between Earth and the Sun, thereby totally or partly obscuring the image of the Sun for a viewer on Earth. An annular solar eclipse occurs when the Moon's apparent diameter is smaller than the Sun's, blocking most of the Sun's light and causing the Sun to look like an annulus (ring). An annular eclipse appears as a partial eclipse over a region of the Earth thousands of kilometres wide. Occurring about 2.1 days after apogee (on March 19, 2099, at 20:00 UTC), the Moon's apparent diameter will be smaller.

The path of annularity will be visible from parts of the Auckland Islands, Chatham Island, and French Polynesia. A partial solar eclipse will also be visible for parts of eastern Australia, Oceania, Antarctica, Hawaii, Mexico, Central America, and the southwestern United States.

== Eclipse details ==
Shown below are two tables displaying details about this particular solar eclipse. The first table outlines times at which the Moon's penumbra or umbra attains the specific parameter, and the second table describes various other parameters pertaining to this eclipse.

March 21, 2099 Solar Eclipse Times
Event	Time (UTC)
First Penumbral External Contact	2099 March 21 at 19:54:47.9 UTC
First Umbral External Contact	2099 March 21 at 21:03:08.8 UTC
First Central Line	2099 March 21 at 21:06:17.6 UTC
First Umbral Internal Contact	2099 March 21 at 21:09:27.2 UTC
First Penumbral Internal Contact	2099 March 21 at 22:37:38.5 UTC
Equatorial Conjunction	2099 March 21 at 22:27:57.2 UTC
Ecliptic Conjunction	2099 March 21 at 22:49:43.7 UTC
Greatest Duration	2099 March 21 at 22:54:15.0 UTC
Greatest Eclipse	2099 March 21 at 22:54:32.0 UTC
Last Penumbral Internal Contact	2099 March 21 at 23:12:04.5 UTC
Last Umbral Internal Contact	2099 March 22 at 00:39:54.6 UTC
Last Central Line	2099 March 22 at 00:43:02.6 UTC
Last Umbral External Contact	2099 March 22 at 00:46:09.5 UTC
Last Penumbral External Contact	2099 March 22 at 01:54:23.7 UTC

March 21, 2099 Solar Eclipse Parameters
Parameter	Value
Eclipse Magnitude	0.93180
Eclipse Obscuration	0.86826
Gamma	−0.40163
Sun Right Ascension	00h06m00.9s
Sun Declination	+00°39'05.5"
Sun Semi-Diameter	16'03.5"
Sun Equatorial Horizontal Parallax	08.8"
Moon Right Ascension	00h06m43.3s
Moon Declination	+00°20'09.1"
Moon Semi-Diameter	14'45.5"
Moon Equatorial Horizontal Parallax	0°54'09.7"
ΔT	122.8 s

== Eclipse season ==
This eclipse is part of an eclipse season, a period, roughly every six months, when eclipses occur. Only two (or occasionally three) eclipse seasons occur each year, and each season lasts about 35 days and repeats just short of six months (173 days) later; thus two full eclipse seasons always occur each year. Either two or three eclipses happen each eclipse season. In the sequence below, each eclipse is separated by a fortnight.

Eclipse season of March–April 2099
March 21 Ascending node (new moon)	April 5 Descending node (full moon)
Annular solar eclipse Solar Saros 131	Partial lunar eclipse Lunar Saros 143

== Related eclipses ==
=== Eclipses in 2099 ===
- An annular solar eclipse on March 21.
- A partial lunar eclipse on April 5.
- A total solar eclipse on September 14.
- A penumbral lunar eclipse on September 29.

=== Metonic ===
- Preceded by: Solar eclipse of June 2, 2095
- Followed by: Solar eclipse of January 8, 2103

=== Tzolkinex ===
- Preceded by: Solar eclipse of February 7, 2092
- Followed by: Solar eclipse of May 3, 2106

=== Half-Saros ===
- Preceded by: Lunar eclipse of March 15, 2090
- Followed by: Lunar eclipse of March 27, 2108

=== Tritos ===
- Preceded by: Solar eclipse of April 21, 2088
- Followed by: Solar eclipse of February 18, 2110

=== Solar Saros 131 ===
- Preceded by: Solar eclipse of March 10, 2081
- Followed by: Solar eclipse of April 2, 2117

=== Inex ===
- Preceded by: Solar eclipse of April 11, 2070
- Followed by: Solar eclipse of March 1, 2128

=== Triad ===
- Preceded by: Solar eclipse of May 20, 2012
- Followed by: Solar eclipse of January 20, 2186

=== Solar eclipses of 2098–2101 ===
This eclipse is a member of a semester series. An eclipse in a semester series of solar eclipses repeats approximately every 177 days and 4 hours (a semester) at alternating nodes of the Moon's orbit.

The partial solar eclipse on October 24, 2098 occurs in the previous lunar year eclipse set.

Solar eclipse series sets from 2098 to 2101
Ascending node			Descending node		
Saros	Map	Gamma	Saros	Map	Gamma
121	April 1, 2098 Partial	−1.1005	126	September 25, 2098 Partial	1.14
131	March 21, 2099 Annular	−0.4016	136	September 14, 2099 Total	0.3942
141	March 10, 2100 Annular	0.3077	146	September 4, 2100 Total	−0.3384
151	February 28, 2101 Annular	0.9964	156	August 24, 2101 Partial	−1.1392

=== Saros 131 ===
This eclipse is a part of Saros series 131, repeating every 18 years, 11 days, and containing 70 events. The series started with a partial solar eclipse on August 1, 1125. It contains total eclipses from March 27, 1522 through May 30, 1612; hybrid eclipses from June 10, 1630 through July 24, 1702; and annular eclipses from August 4, 1720 through June 18, 2243. The series ends at member 70 as a partial eclipse on September 2, 2369. Its eclipses are tabulated in three columns; every third eclipse in the same column is one exeligmos apart, so they all cast shadows over approximately the same parts of the Earth.

The longest duration of totality was produced by member 28 at 58 seconds on May 30, 1612, and the longest duration of annularity was produced by member 50 at 7 minutes, 54 seconds on January 26, 2009. All eclipses in this series occur at the Moon’s ascending node of orbit.

Series members 39–60 occur between 1801 and 2200:
39	40	41
September 28, 1810	October 9, 1828	October 20, 1846
42	43	44
October 30, 1864	November 10, 1882	November 22, 1900
45	46	47
December 3, 1918	December 13, 1936	December 25, 1954
48	49	50
January 4, 1973	January 15, 1991	January 26, 2009
51	52	53
February 6, 2027	February 16, 2045	February 28, 2063
54	55	56
March 10, 2081	March 21, 2099	April 2, 2117
57	58	59
April 13, 2135	April 23, 2153	May 5, 2171
60
May 15, 2189

=== Metonic series ===
The metonic series repeats eclipses every 19 years (6939.69 days), lasting about 5 cycles. Eclipses occur in nearly the same calendar date. In addition, the octon subseries repeats 1/5 of that or every 3.8 years (1387.94 days). All eclipses in this table occur at the Moon's ascending node.

22 eclipse events between June 1, 2076 and October 27, 2163
June 1–3	March 21–22	January 7–8	October 26–27	August 14–15
119	121	123	125	127
June 1, 2076	March 21, 2080	January 7, 2084	October 26, 2087	August 15, 2091
129	131	133	135	137
June 2, 2095	March 21, 2099	January 8, 2103	October 26, 2106	August 15, 2110
139	141	143	145	147
June 3, 2114	March 22, 2118	January 8, 2122	October 26, 2125	August 15, 2129
149	151	153	155	157
June 3, 2133	March 21, 2137	January 8, 2141	October 26, 2144	August 14, 2148
159	161	163	165	
June 3, 2152			October 27, 2163	

=== Tritos series ===
This eclipse is a part of a tritos cycle, repeating at alternating nodes every 135 synodic months (≈ 3986.63 days, or 11 years minus 1 month). Their appearance and longitude are irregular due to a lack of synchronization with the anomalistic month (period of perigee), but groupings of 3 tritos cycles (≈ 33 years minus 3 months) come close (≈ 434.044 anomalistic months), so eclipses are similar in these groupings.

Series members between 1837 and 2200
April 5, 1837 (Saros 107)	March 5, 1848 (Saros 108)	February 3, 1859 (Saros 109)		December 2, 1880 (Saros 111)
		August 31, 1913 (Saros 114)	July 31, 1924 (Saros 115)	June 30, 1935 (Saros 116)
May 30, 1946 (Saros 117)	April 30, 1957 (Saros 118)	March 28, 1968 (Saros 119)	February 26, 1979 (Saros 120)	January 26, 1990 (Saros 121)
December 25, 2000 (Saros 122)	November 25, 2011 (Saros 123)	October 25, 2022 (Saros 124)	September 23, 2033 (Saros 125)	August 23, 2044 (Saros 126)
July 24, 2055 (Saros 127)	June 22, 2066 (Saros 128)	May 22, 2077 (Saros 129)	April 21, 2088 (Saros 130)	March 21, 2099 (Saros 131)
February 18, 2110 (Saros 132)	January 19, 2121 (Saros 133)	December 19, 2131 (Saros 134)	November 17, 2142 (Saros 135)	October 17, 2153 (Saros 136)
September 16, 2164 (Saros 137)	August 16, 2175 (Saros 138)	July 16, 2186 (Saros 139)	June 15, 2197 (Saros 140)	

=== Inex series ===
This eclipse is a part of the long period inex cycle, repeating at alternating nodes, every 358 synodic months (≈ 10,571.95 days, or 29 years minus 20 days). Their appearance and longitude are irregular due to a lack of synchronization with the anomalistic month (period of perigee). However, groupings of 3 inex cycles (≈ 87 years minus 2 months) comes close (≈ 1,151.02 anomalistic months), so eclipses are similar in these groupings.

Series members between 1801 and 2200
October 9, 1809 (Saros 121)	September 18, 1838 (Saros 122)	August 29, 1867 (Saros 123)
August 9, 1896 (Saros 124)	July 20, 1925 (Saros 125)	June 30, 1954 (Saros 126)
June 11, 1983 (Saros 127)	May 20, 2012 (Saros 128)	April 30, 2041 (Saros 129)
April 11, 2070 (Saros 130)	March 21, 2099 (Saros 131)	March 1, 2128 (Saros 132)
February 9, 2157 (Saros 133)	January 20, 2186 (Saros 134)	
