= Solar eclipse of January 26, 2009 =

21st-century annular solar eclipse

- Annular eclipse
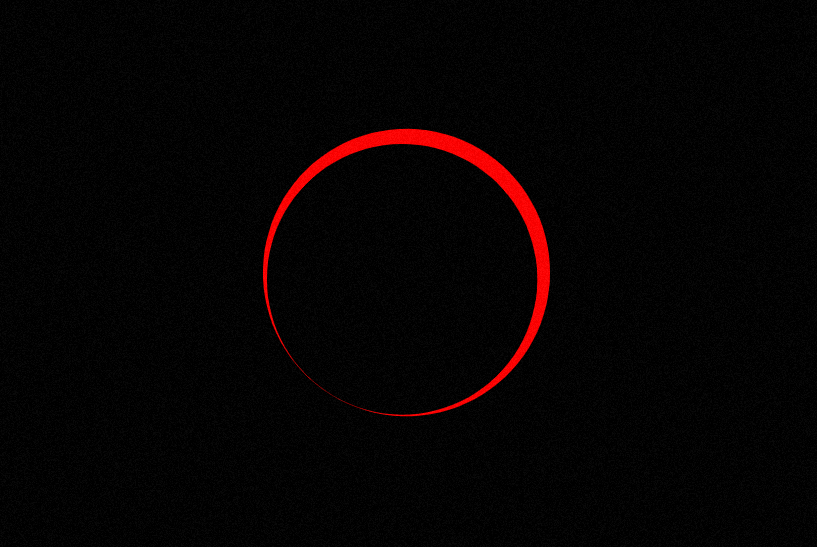
- Annularity from Palangka Raya, Indonesia

- Map
- Gamma: −0.282
- Magnitude: 0.9282

Maximum eclipse
- Duration: 474 s (7 min 54 s)
- Coordinates: 34.1°S 70.2°E
- Max. width of band: 280 km (170 mi)

Times (UTC)
- Greatest eclipse: 7:59:45

References
- Saros: 131 (50 of 70)
- Catalog # (SE5000): 9527

An annular solar eclipse occurred at the Moon's ascending node of orbit on Monday, January 26, 2009, with a magnitude of 0.9282. A solar eclipse occurs when the Moon passes between Earth and the Sun, thereby totally or partly obscuring the image of the Sun for a viewer on Earth. An annular solar eclipse occurs when the Moon's apparent diameter is smaller than the Sun's, blocking most of the Sun's light and causing the Sun to look like an annulus (ring). An annular eclipse appears as a partial eclipse over a region of the Earth thousands of kilometres wide. Occurring about 3.3 days after apogee (on January 23, 2009, at 0:10 UTC), the Moon's apparent diameter was smaller.

The eclipse was visible from a narrow corridor beginning in the south Atlantic Ocean and sweeping eastward 900 km south of Africa, slowly curving northeast through the Indian Ocean. Its first landfall was in the Cocos Islands followed by southern Sumatra and western Java. It continued somewhat more easterly across central Borneo, across the northwestern edge of Celebes, then ending just before Mindanao, Philippines. The duration of annularity at greatest eclipse lasted 7 minutes, 53.58 seconds, but at greatest duration lasted 7 minutes, 56.05 seconds. A partial eclipse was visible for parts of Southern Africa, East Antarctica, Southeast Asia, the Philippines, and Australia.

The date of this eclipse was the exact day of Lunar New Year, celebrated in parts of Asia, where this eclipse was visible.

== Images ==
Animated path

== Eclipse timing ==
=== Places experiencing annular eclipse ===
Solar Eclipse of January 26, 2009 (Local Times)
Country or territory	City or place	Start of partial eclipse	Start of annular eclipse	Maximum eclipse	End of annular eclipse	End of partial eclipse	Duration of annularity (min:s)	Duration of eclipse (hr:min)	Maximum coverage
Cocos (Keeling) Islands	Bantam	14:25:28	15:53:45	15:56:09	15:58:34	17:12:49	4:49	2:47	85.37%
Indonesia	Serang	15:19:40	16:39:36	16:40:46	16:41:58	17:50:29	2:22	2:31	84.81%
Indonesia	Bandar Lampung	15:19:49	16:38:25	16:41:27	16:44:28	17:51:30	6:03	2:32	84.83%
Indonesia	Ketapang	15:29:58	16:44:14	16:47:10	16:50:06	17:54:07	5:52	2:29	84.53%
Indonesia	Samarinda	16:36:45	17:47:53	17:49:00	17:50:08	18:28:12 (sunset)	2:15	1:51	84.18%
Indonesia	Sangatta	16:38:07	17:47:21	17:49:57	17:52:34	18:25:16 (sunset)	5:13	1:47	84.14%

=== Places experiencing partial eclipse ===
Solar Eclipse of January 26, 2009 (Local Times)
Country or territory	City or place	Start of partial eclipse	Maximum eclipse	End of partial eclipse	Duration of eclipse (hr:min)	Maximum coverage
Namibia	Windhoek	07:01:44	08:04:05	09:16:49	2:15	29.07%
Saint Helena, Ascension and Tristan da Cunha	Edinburgh of the Seven Seas	05:58:02 (sunrise)	06:07:58	07:15:07	1:17	82.16%
South Africa	Cape Town	06:58:48	08:12:03	09:37:28	2:39	63.42%
Botswana	Gaborone	07:06:02	08:15:35	09:37:54	2:32	30.34%
South Africa	Johannesburg	07:06:26	08:19:31	09:46:11	2:40	34.17%
Lesotho	Maseru	07:03:48	08:19:50	09:49:43	2:46	44.08%
Eswatini	Mbabane	07:09:26	08:25:11	09:54:54	2:45	33.71%
Bouvet Island	Bouvet Island	06:23:07	07:26:30	08:35:15	2:12	48.36%
Mozambique	Maputo	07:11:26	08:28:00	09:58:35	2:47	32.37%
South Africa	Marion Island	08:18:48	09:44:10	11:18:19	3:00	81.13%
French Southern and Antarctic Lands	Port-aux-Français	11:05:48	12:35:10	14:02:13	2:56	52.02%
Réunion	Saint-Denis	10:03:50	11:45:34	13:24:59	3:21	30.86%
Mauritius	Port Louis	11:10:42	12:54:22	14:32:58	3:22	32.06%
French Southern and Antarctic Lands	Île Amsterdam	11:24:01	13:05:39	14:38:20	3:14	69.88%
British Indian Ocean Territory	Diego Garcia	13:30:35	15:05:58	16:26:41	2:56	31.90%
Australia	Darwin	18:03:57	19:03:52	19:19:54 (sunset)	1:16	41.30%
Christmas Island	Flying Fish Cove	15:12:06	16:34:14	17:44:45	2:33	76.91%
Timor-Leste	Dili	17:33:52	18:39:25	19:05:26 (sunset)	1:32	55.48%
Indonesia	Jakarta	15:20:23	16:40:58	17:50:18	2:30	84.50%
Philippines	General Santos	16:46:21	17:44:51	17:47:08 (sunset)	1:01	74.77%
Singapore	Singapore	16:30:01	17:49:26	18:57:54	2:28	72.28%
Philippines	Manila	16:55:04	17:49:44	17:52:09 (sunset)	0:57	51.31%
Malaysia	Kuala Lumpur	16:31:51	17:50:54	18:59:03	2:27	63.75%
Brunei	Bandar Seri Begawan	16:42:12	17:54:05	18:29:43 (sunset)	1:48	77.19%
Philippines	Zamboanga City	16:46:38	17:54:26	17:58:27 (sunset)	1:12	78.93%
Hong Kong	Hong Kong	17:07:36	17:56:22	18:07:53 (sunset)	1:00	25.10%
Vietnam	Ho Chi Minh City	15:48:12	16:58:37	17:54:39 (sunset)	2:06	49.60%
Cambodia	Phnom Penh	15:49:13	16:59:01	18:00:32	2:11	44.97%
Thailand	Bangkok	15:53:02	16:59:50	17:58:57	2:06	33.11%
Vietnam	Hanoi	16:08:07	17:03:33	17:43:11 (sunset)	1:35	20.98%

== Gallery ==
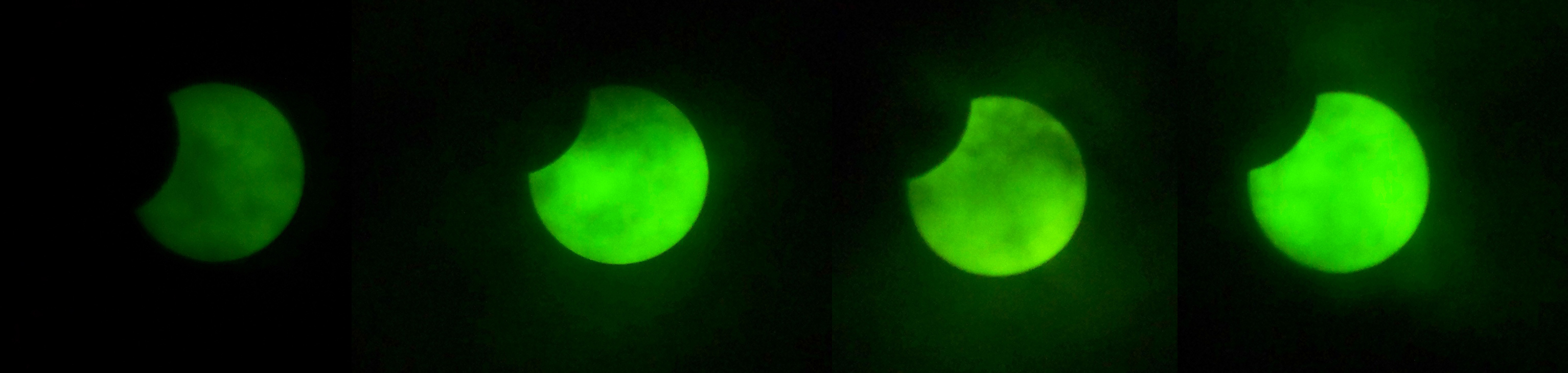
Progression from Colombo, Sri Lanka

Simulated view of relative diameters of Sun and Moon, as viewed near sunset at the central eclipse path over Borneo.

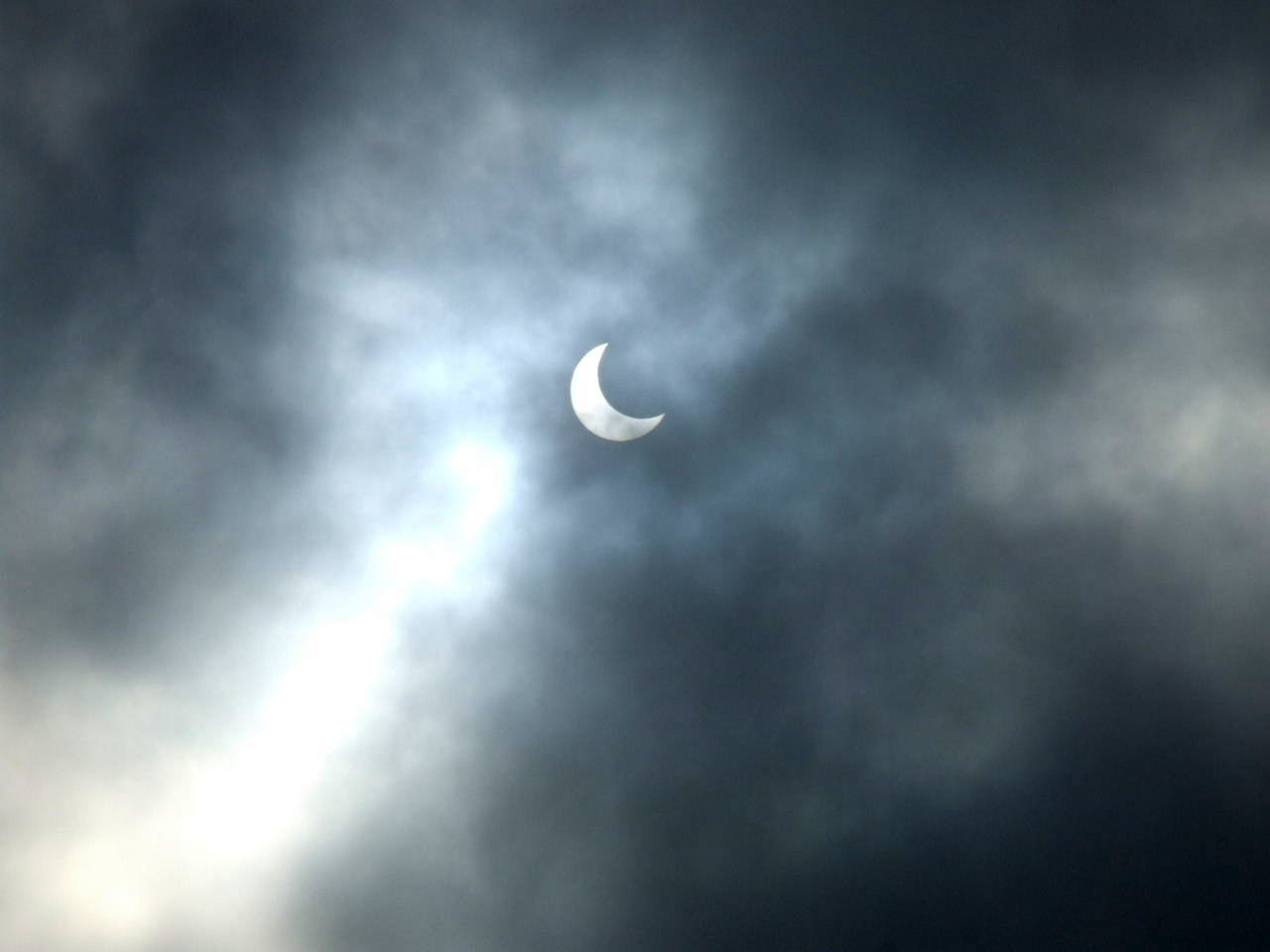
George, South Africa, 6:04 UTC

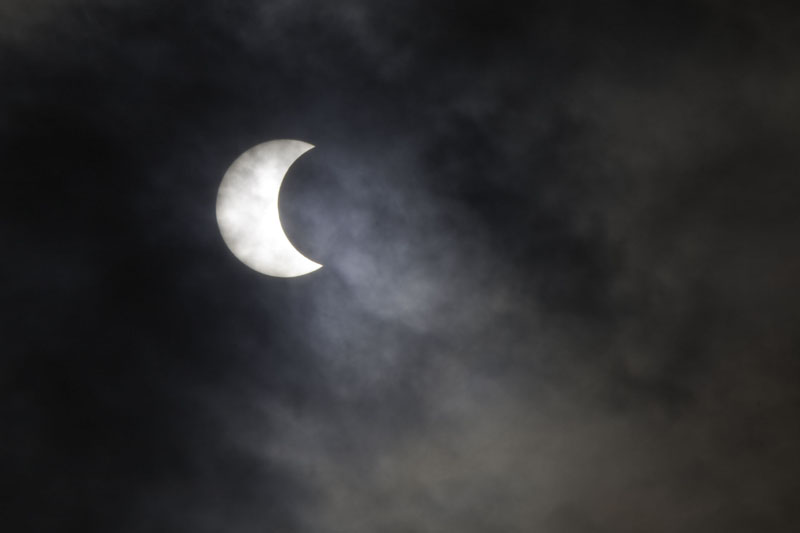
Bloemfontein, South Africa, 6:18 UTC

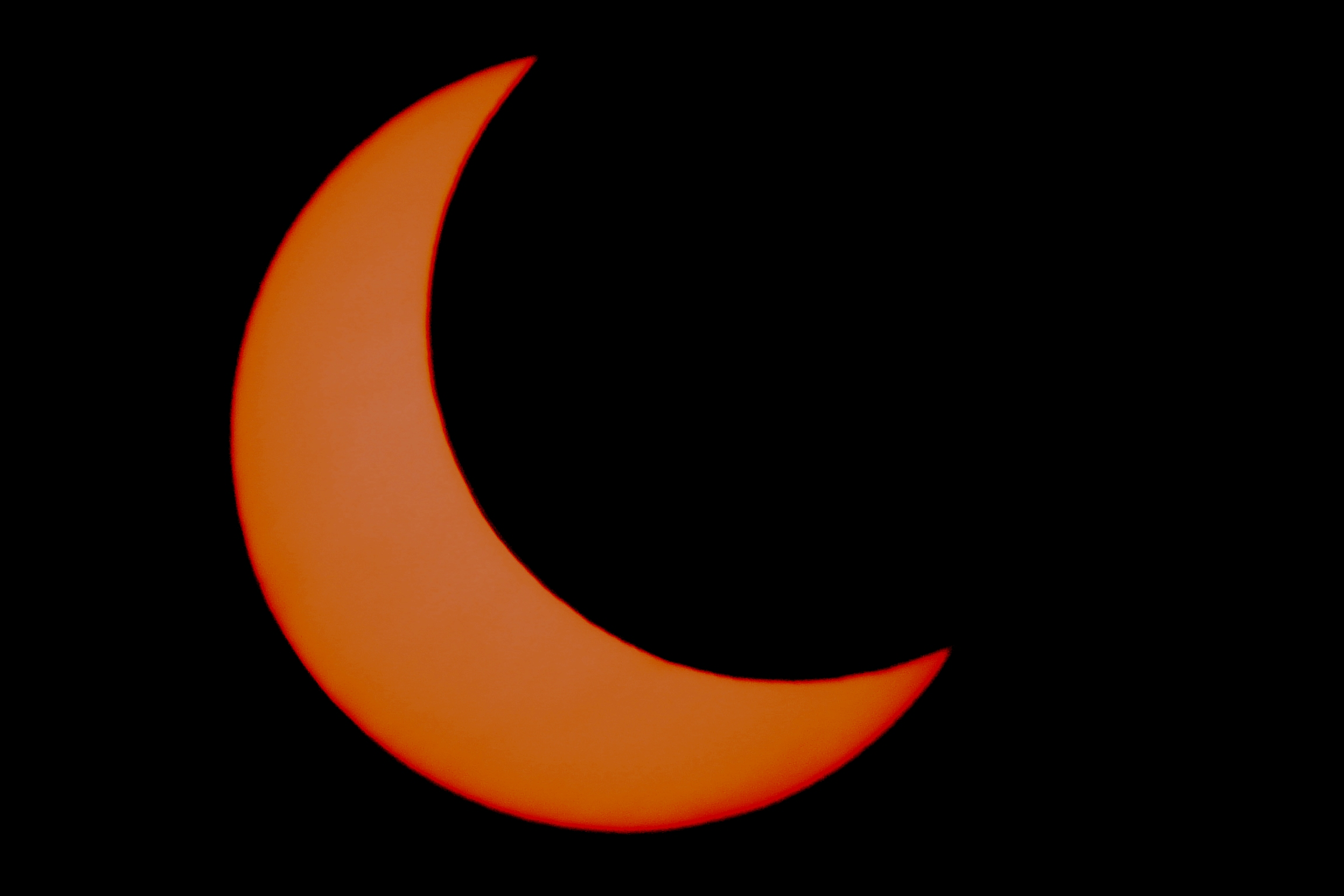
Riversdale, South Africa. 6:21 UTC

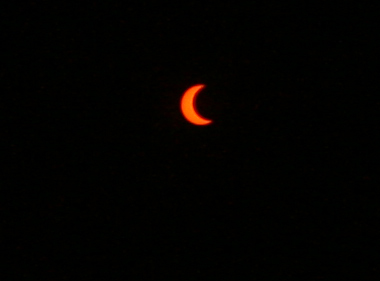
Cape Town, South Africa, 6:30 UTC

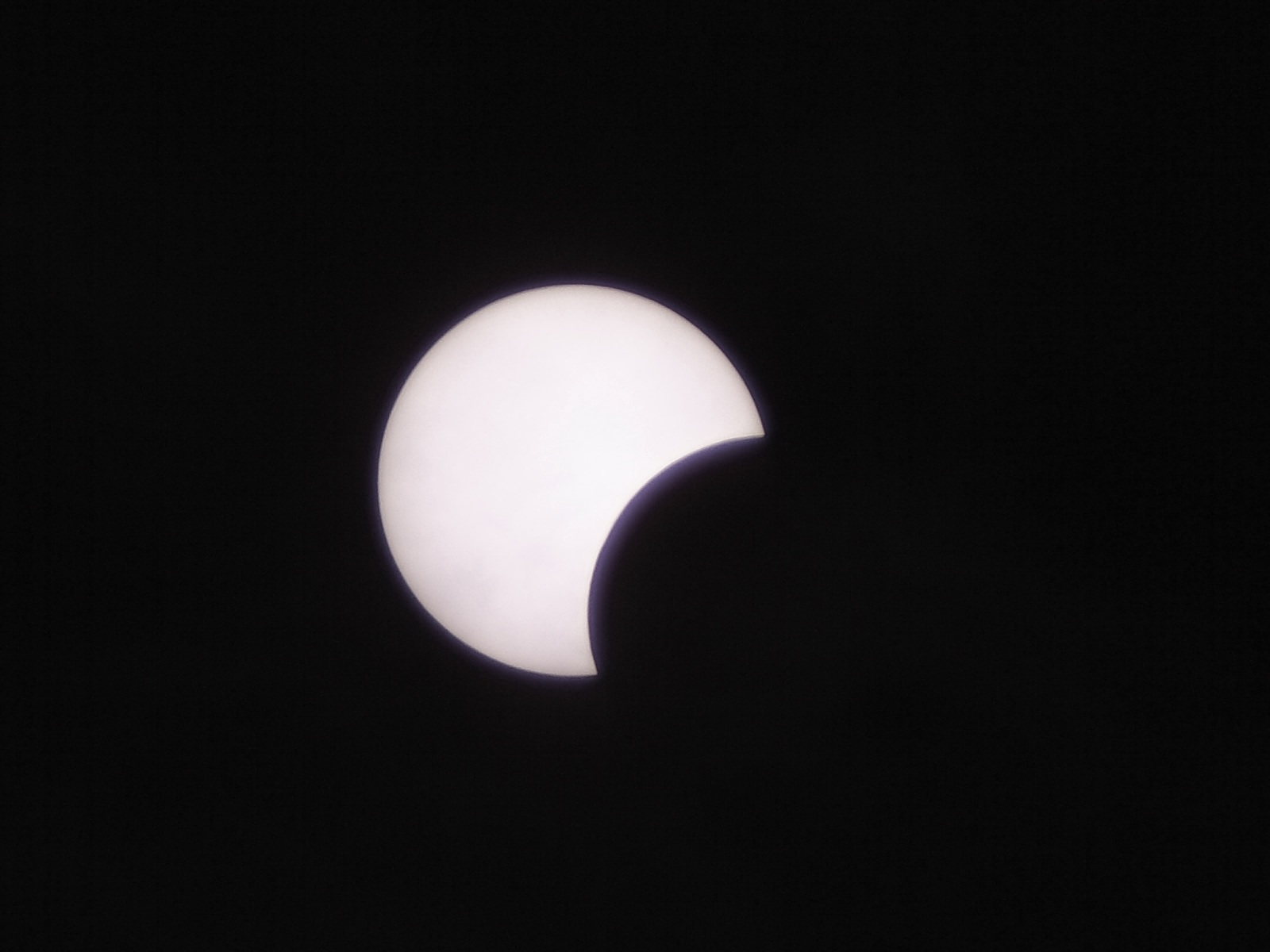
Helpmekaar Kollege, South Africa, 6:54 UTC

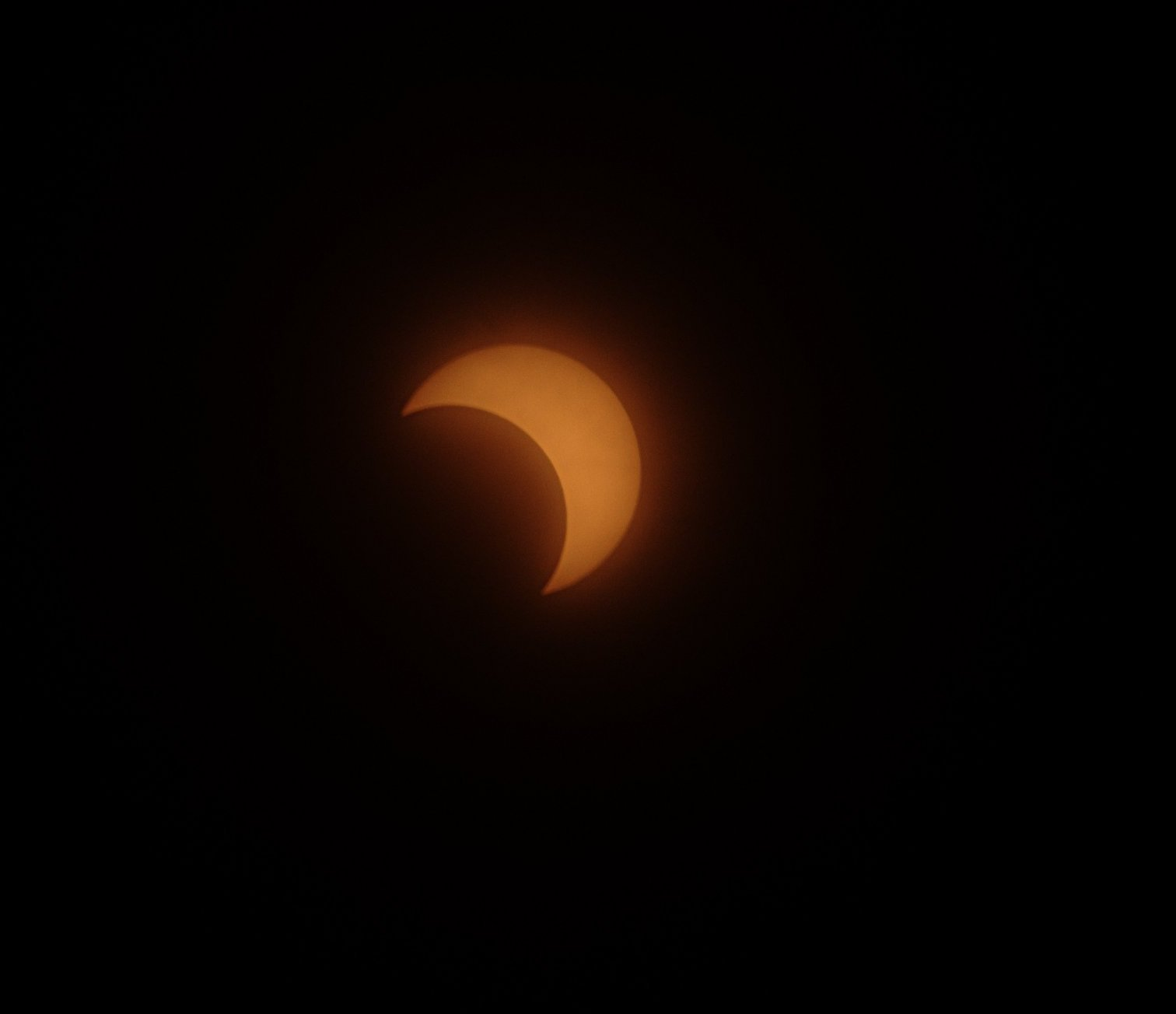
Bukit Merah, Singapore, 9:27 UTC

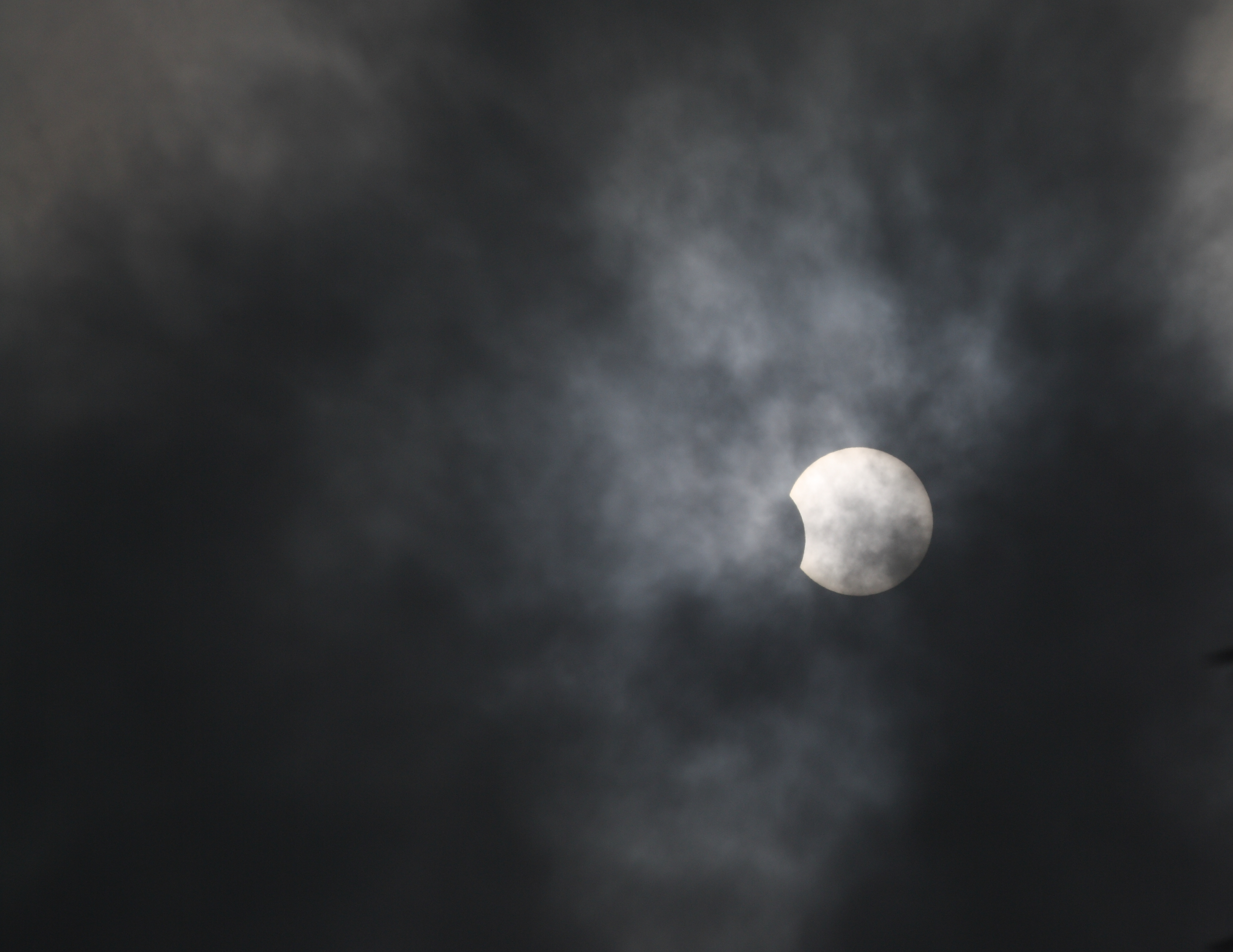
Chennai, India, 9:29 UTC

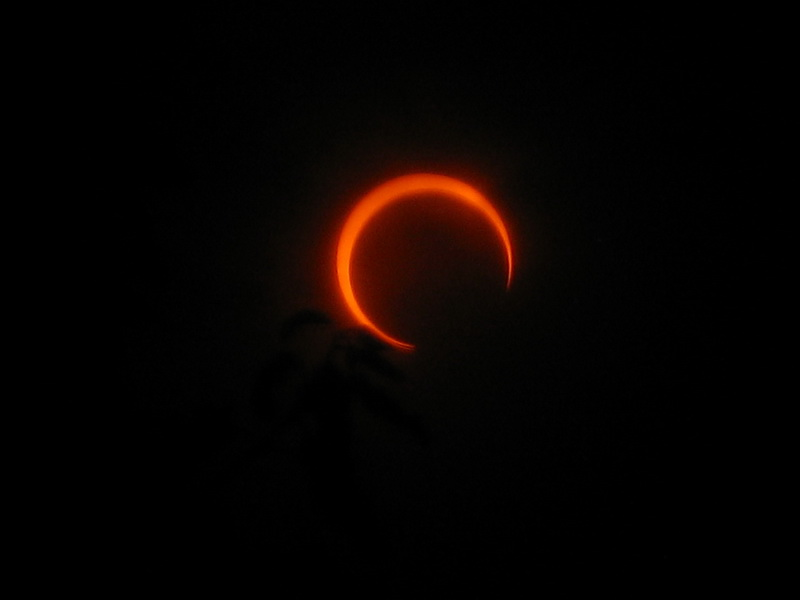
Jakarta, Indonesia, 9:41 UTC

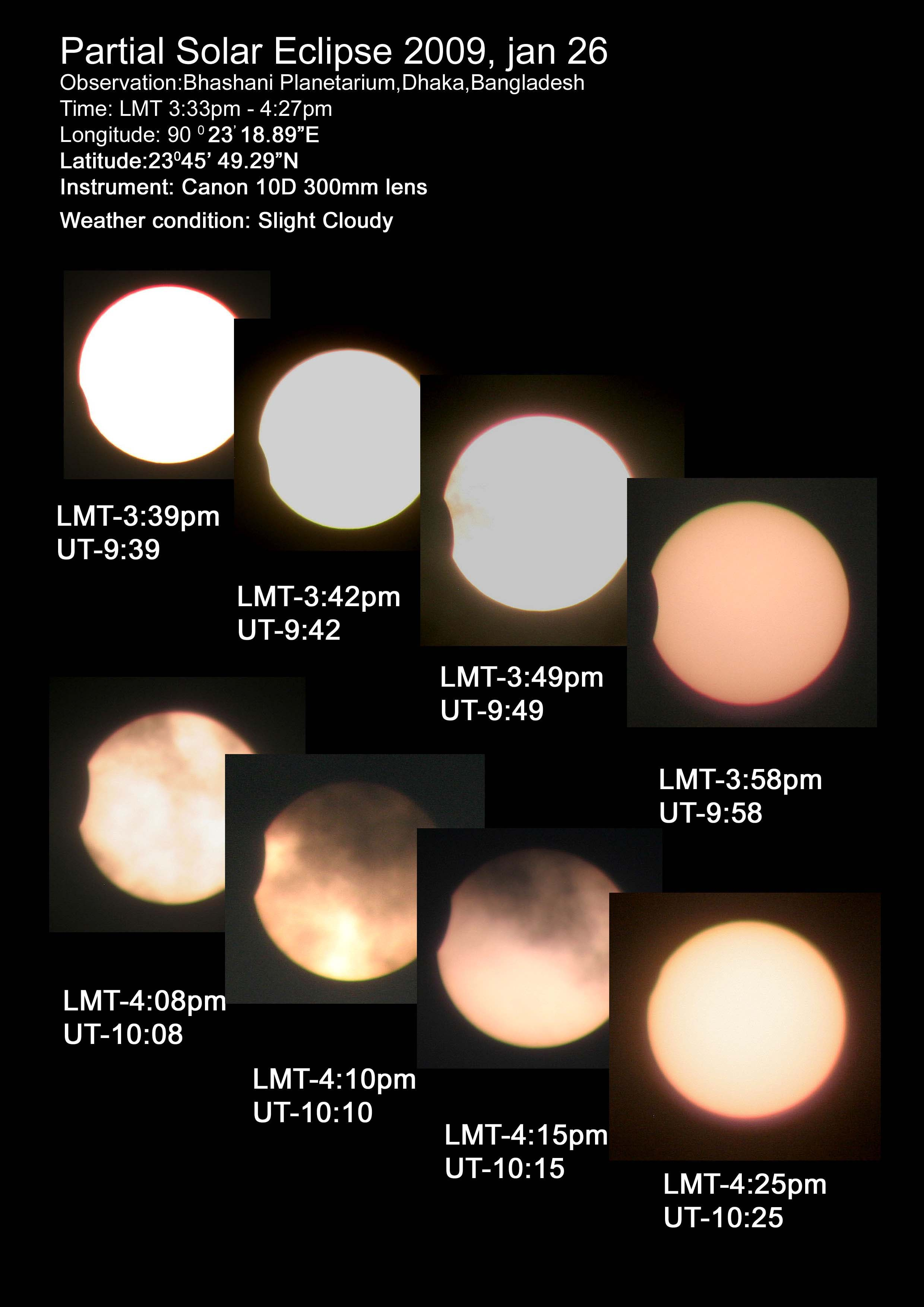
Progression from Dhaka, Bangladesh

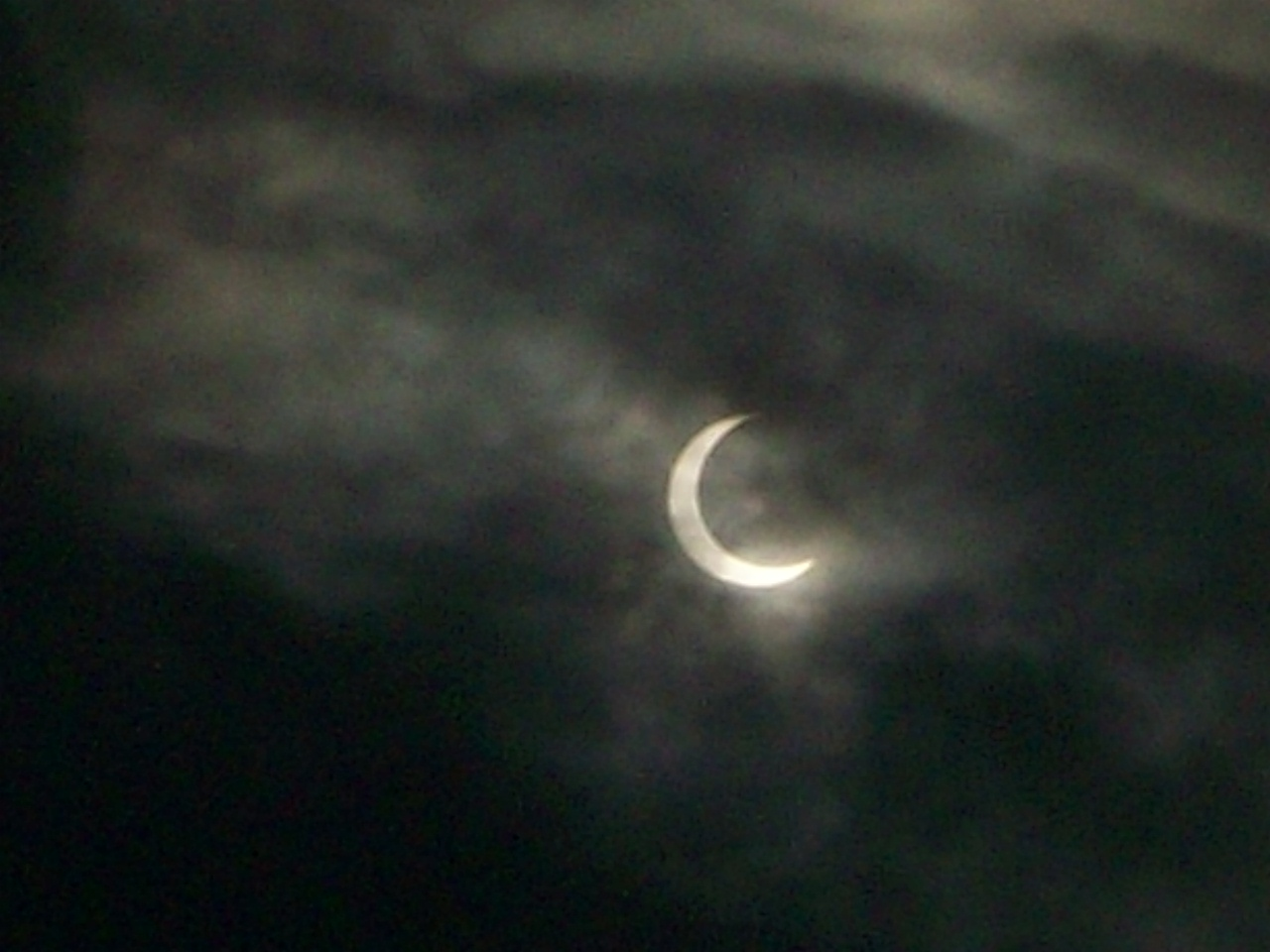
Bandung, Indonesia, 9:48 UTC

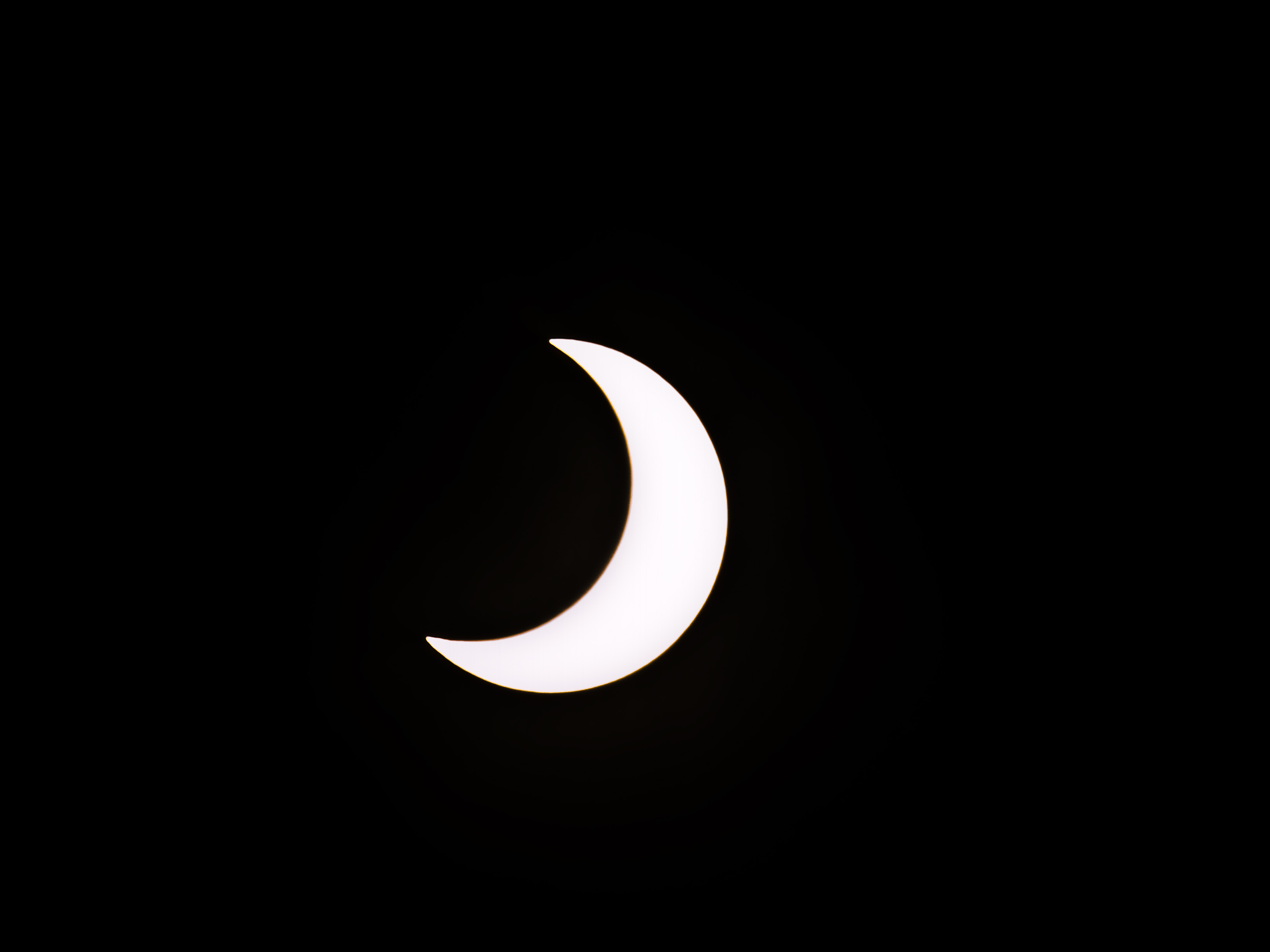
Subang Jaya, Malaysia, 9:51 UTC

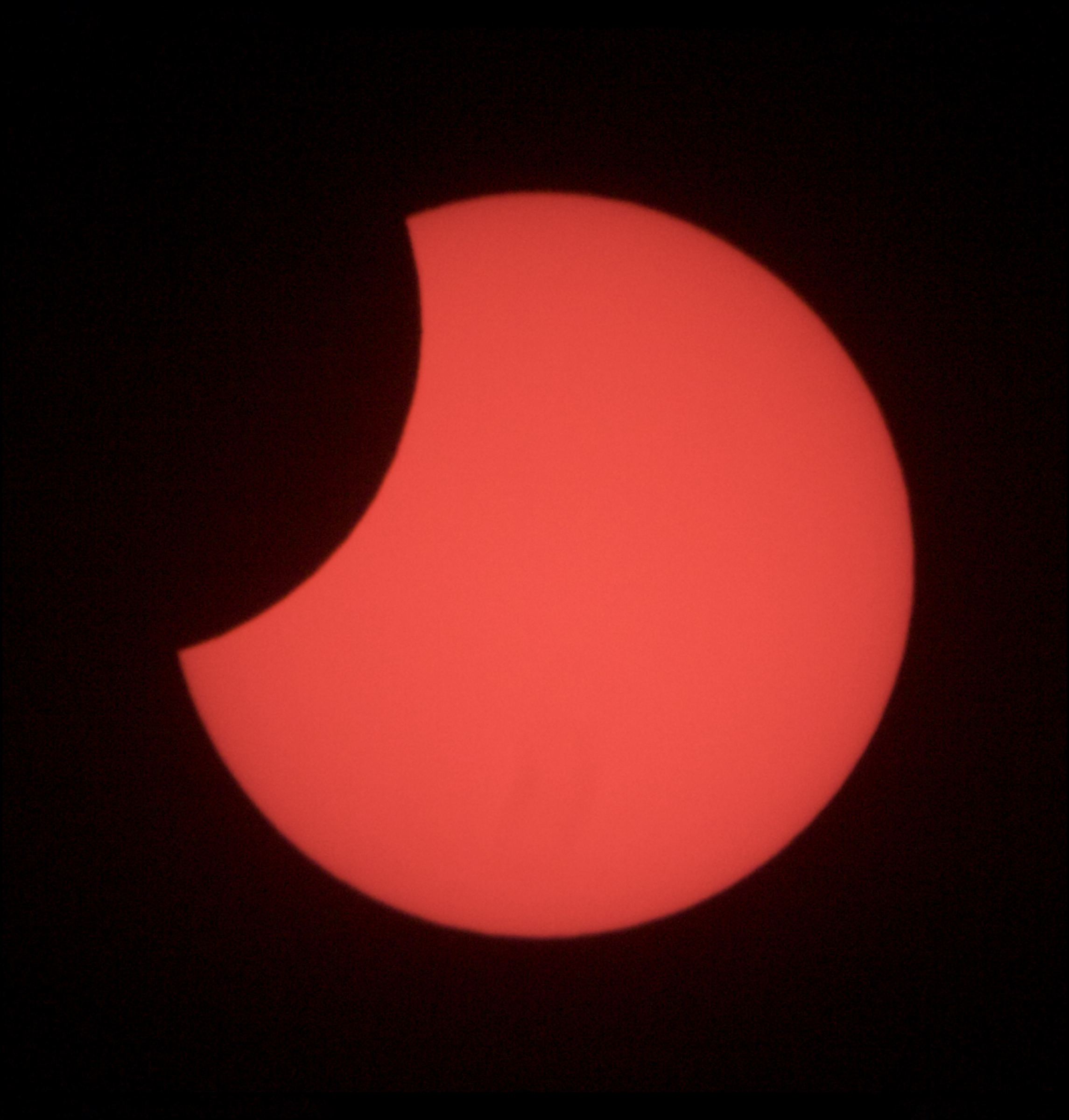
Nugegoda, Sri Lanka, 9:58 UTC

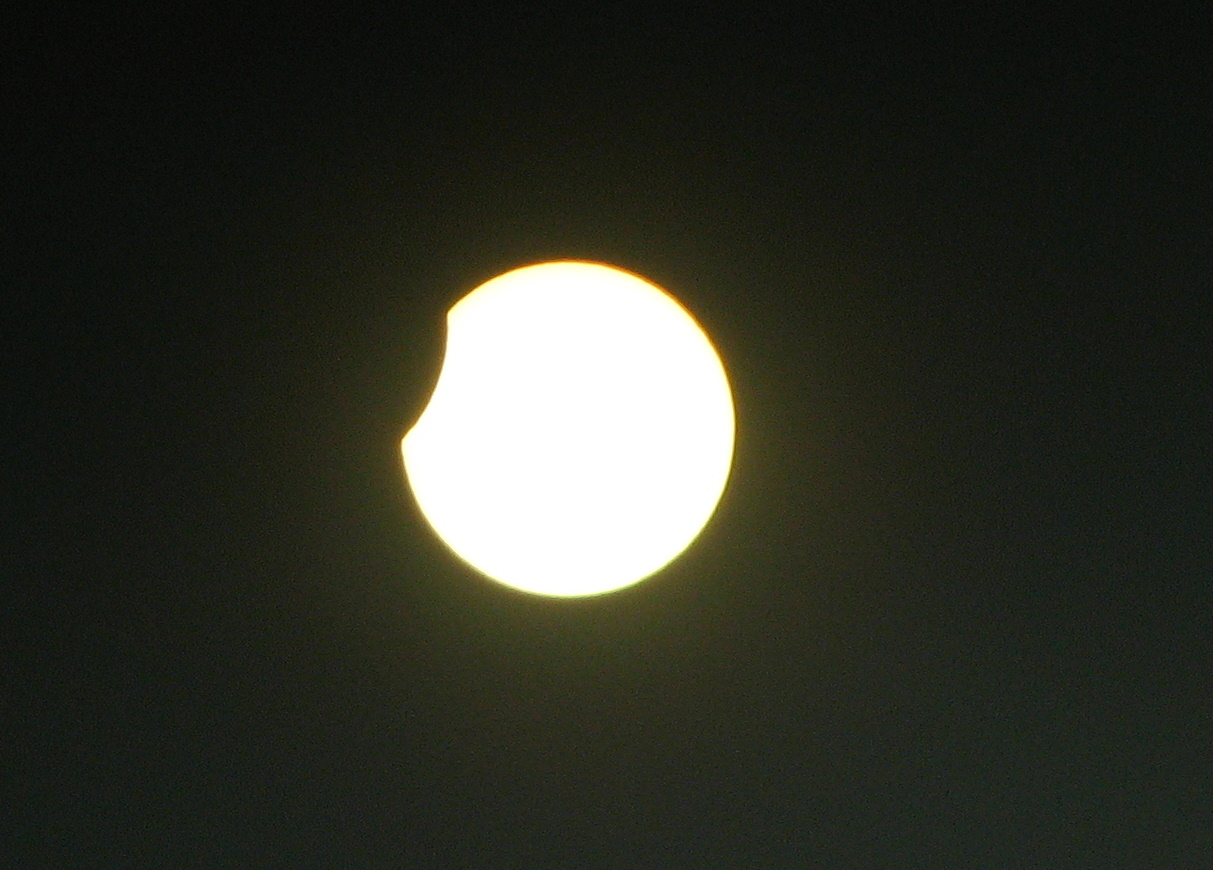
Bangalore, India, 10:02 UTC

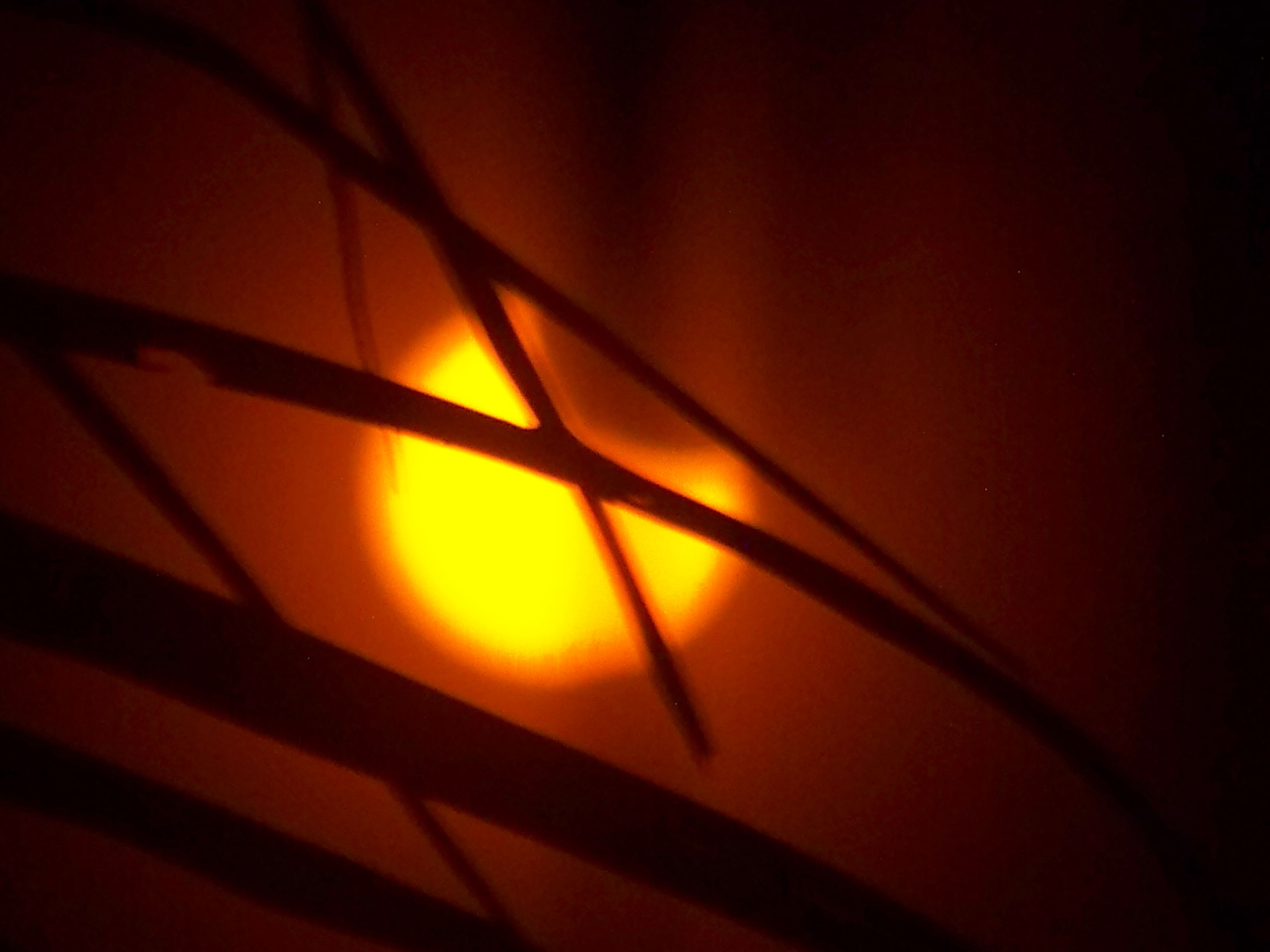
Serang, Indonesia, 10:22 UTC

== Eclipse details ==
Shown below are two tables displaying details about this particular solar eclipse. The first table outlines times at which the Moon's penumbra or umbra attains the specific parameter, and the second table describes various other parameters pertaining to this eclipse.

January 26, 2009 Solar Eclipse Times
Event	Time (UTC)
First Penumbral External Contact	2009 January 26 at 04:57:42.7 UTC
First Umbral External Contact	2009 January 26 at 06:03:44.5 UTC
First Central Line	2009 January 26 at 06:06:54.1 UTC
First Umbral Internal Contact	2009 January 26 at 06:10:04.0 UTC
First Penumbral Internal Contact	2009 January 26 at 07:22:11.5 UTC
Greatest Duration	2009 January 26 at 07:43:23.8 UTC
Equatorial Conjunction	2009 January 26 at 07:47:30.2 UTC
Ecliptic Conjunction	2009 January 26 at 07:56:23.1 UTC
Greatest Eclipse	2009 January 26 at 07:59:44.5 UTC
Last Penumbral Internal Contact	2009 January 26 at 08:37:36.7 UTC
Last Umbral Internal Contact	2009 January 26 at 09:49:34.5 UTC
Last Central Line	2009 January 26 at 09:52:42.3 UTC
Last Umbral External Contact	2009 January 26 at 09:55:49.6 UTC
Last Penumbral External Contact	2009 January 26 at 11:01:46.9 UTC

January 26, 2009 Solar Eclipse Parameters
Parameter	Value
Eclipse Magnitude	0.92825
Eclipse Obscuration	0.86165
Gamma	−0.28197
Sun Right Ascension	20h35m32.8s
Sun Declination	-18°38'55.0"
Sun Semi-Diameter	16'14.6"
Sun Equatorial Horizontal Parallax	08.9"
Moon Right Ascension	20h35m55.2s
Moon Declination	-18°53'18.2"
Moon Semi-Diameter	14'51.6"
Moon Equatorial Horizontal Parallax	0°54'32.2"
ΔT	65.8 s

== Eclipse season ==
This eclipse is part of an eclipse season, a period, roughly every six months, when eclipses occur. Only two (or occasionally three) eclipse seasons occur each year, and each season lasts about 35 days and repeats just short of six months (173 days) later; thus two full eclipse seasons always occur each year. Either two or three eclipses happen each eclipse season. In the sequence below, each eclipse is separated by a fortnight.

Eclipse season of January–February 2009
January 26 Ascending node (new moon)	February 9 Descending node (full moon)
Annular solar eclipse Solar Saros 131	Penumbral lunar eclipse Lunar Saros 143

== Related eclipses ==
=== Eclipses in 2009 ===
- An annular solar eclipse on January 26.
- A penumbral lunar eclipse on February 9.
- A penumbral lunar eclipse on July 7.
- A total solar eclipse on July 22.
- A penumbral lunar eclipse on August 6.
- A partial lunar eclipse on December 31.

=== Metonic ===
- Preceded by: Solar eclipse of April 8, 2005
- Followed by: Solar eclipse of November 13, 2012

=== Tzolkinex ===
- Preceded by: Solar eclipse of December 14, 2001
- Followed by: Solar eclipse of March 9, 2016

=== Half-Saros ===
- Preceded by: Lunar eclipse of January 21, 2000
- Followed by: Lunar eclipse of January 31, 2018

=== Tritos ===
- Preceded by: Solar eclipse of February 26, 1998
- Followed by: Solar eclipse of December 26, 2019

=== Solar Saros 131 ===
- Preceded by: Solar eclipse of January 15, 1991
- Followed by: Solar eclipse of February 6, 2027

=== Inex ===
- Preceded by: Solar eclipse of February 16, 1980
- Followed by: Solar eclipse of January 5, 2038

=== Triad ===
- Preceded by: Solar eclipse of March 28, 1922
- Followed by: Solar eclipse of November 27, 2095

=== Solar eclipses of 2008–2011 ===
This eclipse is a member of a semester series. An eclipse in a semester series of solar eclipses repeats approximately every 177 days and 4 hours (a semester) at alternating nodes of the Moon's orbit.

The partial solar eclipses on June 1, 2011 and November 25, 2011 occur in the next lunar year eclipse set.

Solar eclipse series sets from 2008 to 2011
Ascending node			Descending node		
Saros	Map	Gamma	Saros	Map	Gamma
121 Partial in Christchurch, New Zealand	February 7, 2008 Annular	−0.95701	126 Totality in Kumul, Xinjiang, China	August 1, 2008 Total	0.83070
131 Annularity in Palangka Raya, Indonesia	January 26, 2009 Annular	−0.28197	136 Totality in Kurigram District, Bangladesh	July 22, 2009 Total	0.06977
141 Annularity in Jinan, Shandong, China	January 15, 2010 Annular	0.40016	146 Totality in Hao, French Polynesia	July 11, 2010 Total	−0.67877
151 Partial in Poland	January 4, 2011 Partial	1.06265	156	July 1, 2011 Partial	−1.49171

=== Saros 131 ===
This eclipse is a part of Saros series 131, repeating every 18 years, 11 days, and containing 70 events. The series started with a partial solar eclipse on August 1, 1125. It contains total eclipses from March 27, 1522 through May 30, 1612; hybrid eclipses from June 10, 1630 through July 24, 1702; and annular eclipses from August 4, 1720 through June 18, 2243. The series ends at member 70 as a partial eclipse on September 2, 2369. Its eclipses are tabulated in three columns; every third eclipse in the same column is one exeligmos apart, so they all cast shadows over approximately the same parts of the Earth.

The longest duration of totality was produced by member 28 at 58 seconds on May 30, 1612, and the longest duration of annularity was produced by member 50 at 7 minutes, 54 seconds on January 26, 2009. All eclipses in this series occur at the Moon’s ascending node of orbit.

Series members 39–60 occur between 1801 and 2200:
39	40	41
September 28, 1810	October 9, 1828	October 20, 1846
42	43	44
October 30, 1864	November 10, 1882	November 22, 1900
45	46	47
December 3, 1918	December 13, 1936	December 25, 1954
48	49	50
January 4, 1973	January 15, 1991	January 26, 2009
51	52	53
February 6, 2027	February 16, 2045	February 28, 2063
54	55	56
March 10, 2081	March 21, 2099	April 2, 2117
57	58	59
April 13, 2135	April 23, 2153	May 5, 2171
60
May 15, 2189

=== Metonic series ===
The metonic series repeats eclipses every 19 years (6939.69 days), lasting about 5 cycles. Eclipses occur in nearly the same calendar date. In addition, the octon subseries repeats 1/5 of that or every 3.8 years (1387.94 days). All eclipses in this table occur at the Moon's ascending node.

21 eclipse events between June 21, 1982 and June 21, 2058
June 21	April 8–9	January 26	November 13–14	September 1–2
117	119	121	123	125
June 21, 1982	April 9, 1986	January 26, 1990	November 13, 1993	September 2, 1997
127	129	131	133	135
June 21, 2001	April 8, 2005	January 26, 2009	November 13, 2012	September 1, 2016
137	139	141	143	145
June 21, 2020	April 8, 2024	January 26, 2028	November 14, 2031	September 2, 2035
147	149	151	153	155
June 21, 2039	April 9, 2043	January 26, 2047	November 14, 2050	September 2, 2054
157
June 21, 2058

=== Tritos series ===
This eclipse is a part of a tritos cycle, repeating at alternating nodes every 135 synodic months (≈ 3986.63 days, or 11 years minus 1 month). Their appearance and longitude are irregular due to a lack of synchronization with the anomalistic month (period of perigee), but groupings of 3 tritos cycles (≈ 33 years minus 3 months) come close (≈ 434.044 anomalistic months), so eclipses are similar in these groupings.

Series members between 1801 and 2200
September 8, 1801 (Saros 112)	August 7, 1812 (Saros 113)	July 8, 1823 (Saros 114)	June 7, 1834 (Saros 115)	May 6, 1845 (Saros 116)
April 5, 1856 (Saros 117)	March 6, 1867 (Saros 118)	February 2, 1878 (Saros 119)	January 1, 1889 (Saros 120)	December 3, 1899 (Saros 121)
November 2, 1910 (Saros 122)	October 1, 1921 (Saros 123)	August 31, 1932 (Saros 124)	August 1, 1943 (Saros 125)	June 30, 1954 (Saros 126)
May 30, 1965 (Saros 127)	April 29, 1976 (Saros 128)	March 29, 1987 (Saros 129)	February 26, 1998 (Saros 130)	January 26, 2009 (Saros 131)
December 26, 2019 (Saros 132)	November 25, 2030 (Saros 133)	October 25, 2041 (Saros 134)	September 22, 2052 (Saros 135)	August 24, 2063 (Saros 136)
July 24, 2074 (Saros 137)	June 22, 2085 (Saros 138)	May 22, 2096 (Saros 139)	April 23, 2107 (Saros 140)	March 22, 2118 (Saros 141)
February 18, 2129 (Saros 142)	January 20, 2140 (Saros 143)	December 19, 2150 (Saros 144)	November 17, 2161 (Saros 145)	October 17, 2172 (Saros 146)
September 16, 2183 (Saros 147)	August 16, 2194 (Saros 148)			

=== Inex series ===
This eclipse is a part of the long period inex cycle, repeating at alternating nodes, every 358 synodic months (≈ 10,571.95 days, or 29 years minus 20 days). Their appearance and longitude are irregular due to a lack of synchronization with the anomalistic month (period of perigee). However, groupings of 3 inex cycles (≈ 87 years minus 2 months) comes close (≈ 1,151.02 anomalistic months), so eclipses are similar in these groupings.

Series members between 1801 and 2200
June 16, 1806 (Saros 124)	May 27, 1835 (Saros 125)	May 6, 1864 (Saros 126)
April 16, 1893 (Saros 127)	March 28, 1922 (Saros 128)	March 7, 1951 (Saros 129)
February 16, 1980 (Saros 130)	January 26, 2009 (Saros 131)	January 5, 2038 (Saros 132)
December 17, 2066 (Saros 133)	November 27, 2095 (Saros 134)	November 6, 2124 (Saros 135)
October 17, 2153 (Saros 136)	September 27, 2182 (Saros 137)	
