= Solar eclipse of February 26, 1998 =

Total eclipse

- Total eclipse
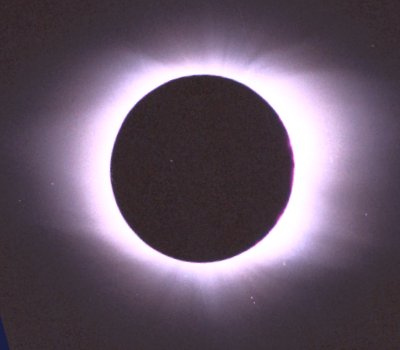
- Totality viewed off Guadeloupe

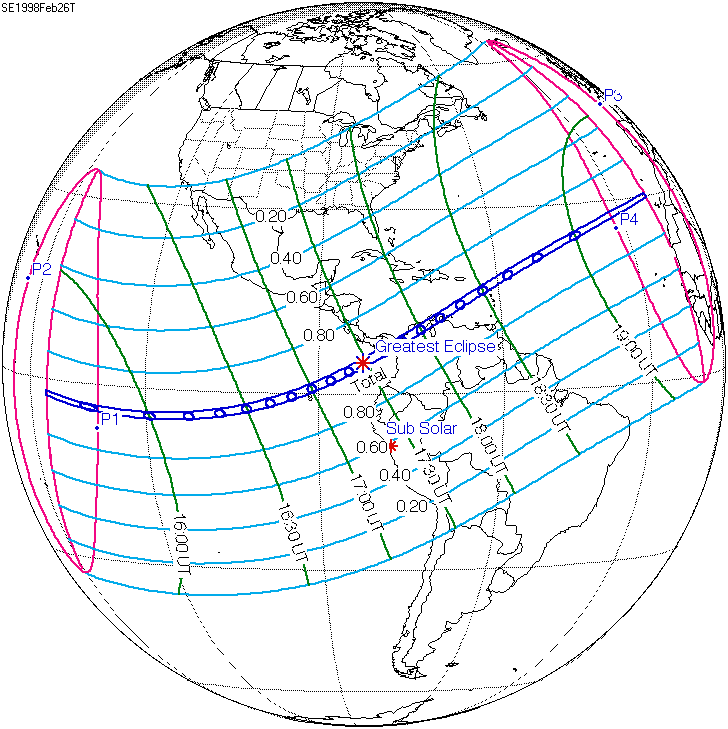
- Map
- Gamma: 0.2391
- Magnitude: 1.0441

Maximum eclipse
- Duration: 249 s (4 min 9 s)
- Coordinates: 4.7°N 82.7°W
- Max. width of band: 151 km (94 mi)

Times (UTC)
- Greatest eclipse: 17:29:27

References
- Saros: 130 (51 of 73)
- Catalog # (SE5000): 9503

A total solar eclipse occurred at the Moon's descending node of orbit on Thursday, February 26, 1998, with a magnitude of 1.0441. A solar eclipse occurs when the Moon passes between Earth and the Sun, thereby totally or partly obscuring the image of the Sun for a viewer on Earth. A total solar eclipse occurs when the Moon's apparent diameter is larger than the Sun's, blocking all direct sunlight, turning day into darkness. Totality occurs in a narrow path across Earth's surface, with the partial solar eclipse visible over a surrounding region thousands of kilometres wide. Occurring about 1.1 days before perigee (on February 27, 1998, at 19:50 UTC), the Moon's apparent diameter was larger.

Totality was visible in the Galápagos Islands, Panama, Colombia, the Paraguaná Peninsula in northwestern Venezuela, all of Aruba, most of Curaçao and the northwestern tip of Bonaire (belonging to Netherlands Antilles which dissolved later), all of Montserrat, Guadeloupe and Antigua and Barbuda. A partial eclipse was visible for parts of Mexico, the southern and eastern United States, Central America, the Caribbean, northern South America, West Africa, and the Iberian Peninsula.

== Observations ==
Jay Pasachoff led a team from Williams College, Massachusetts to Aruba and studied the rapid oscillations of the corona and coronal temperature, and also recorded coronal and other solar images in the visible and infrared parts of the spectrum. The team also photographed the corona using the same green filter onboard the Solar and Heliospheric Observatory, providing calibration for the spacecraft. Fred Espenak, an astrophysicist of NASA's Goddard Space Flight Center also observed it in Aruba. Clouds gradually gathered at the beginning of the eclipse, and it rained for a while. This was the first precipitation on the island in 6 months. Later, the sky gradually cleared up and totality was successfully seen. The wind speed on the island was often larger than 30 knots.

A team of the Johnson Space Center observed the eclipse in Curaçao. Curaçao got the first precipitation in 4 months on the morning of the eclipse day, but it gradually cleared up afterwards. During the totality, the sky was completely clear. The corona was extending in the east-west direction, and helmet streamers could be seen at the poles of the Sun.

== Eclipse timing ==
=== Places experiencing total eclipse ===
Solar Eclipse of February 26, 1998 (Local Times)
Country or territory	City or place	Start of partial eclipse	Start of total eclipse	Maximum eclipse	End of total eclipse	End of partial eclipse	Duration of totality (min:s)	Duration of eclipse (hr:min)	Maximum magnitude
Colombia	Montería	11:17:10	12:50:12	12:52:11	12:54:11	14:21:48	3:59	3:05	1.019
Colombia	Sincelejo	11:19:16	12:52:24	12:54:10	12:55:55	14:23:18	3:31	3:04	1.0119
Colombia	Valledupar	11:26:42	12:59:12	13:01:01	13:02:50	14:28:26	3:38	3:02	1.0142
Venezuela	Maracaibo	12:31:23	14:03:44	14:05:13	14:06:42	15:31:27	2:58	3:00	1.008
Aruba	Oranjestad	12:38:18	14:09:36	14:11:07	14:12:38	15:35:41	3:02	2:57	1.0092
Curaçao	Willemstad	12:40:38	14:12:02	14:13:08	14:14:13	15:37:02	2:11	2:56	1.0043
Montserrat	Brades	13:03:49	14:29:57	14:31:18	14:32:39	15:49:06	2:42	2:45	1.0089
Guadeloupe	Basse-Terre	13:04:05	14:30:51	14:31:33	14:32:16	15:49:13	1:25	2:45	1.0023
Guadeloupe	Pointe-à-Pitre	13:04:50	14:30:56	14:32:06	14:33:16	15:49:34	2:20	2:45	1.0064
Antigua and Barbuda	St. John's	13:05:05	14:31:12	14:32:13	14:33:13	15:49:40	2:01	2:45	1.0047

=== Places experiencing partial eclipse ===
Solar Eclipse of February 26, 1998 (Local Times)
Country or territory	City or place	Start of partial eclipse	Maximum eclipse	End of partial eclipse	Duration of eclipse (hr:min)	Maximum coverage
Ecuador	Galápagos Islands	09:31:30	11:01:22	12:36:40	3:05	95.70%
Costa Rica	San José	09:58:55	11:31:50	13:04:20	3:05	82.71%
Ecuador	Quito	10:59:21	12:32:19	14:03:09	3:04	77.64%
Panama	Panama City	11:08:09	12:42:58	14:14:27	3:06	95.05%
Colombia	Bogotá	11:16:45	12:51:02	14:19:38	3:03	85.65%
Haiti	Port-au-Prince	11:42:35	13:12:11	14:34:36	2:52	76.21%
Caribbean Netherlands	Kralendijk	12:42:28	14:14:38	15:38:03	2:56	99.71%
Venezuela	Caracas	12:44:12	14:15:49	15:38:24	2:54	91.56%
Dominican Republic	Santo Domingo	12:47:56	14:17:21	15:38:49	2:51	81.24%
Puerto Rico	San Juan	12:56:47	14:25:11	15:44:42	2:48	88.65%
Trinidad and Tobago	Port of Spain	12:59:26	14:27:06	15:44:57	2:46	81.17%
United States Virgin Islands	Christiansted	12:59:04	14:27:22	15:46:25	2:47	93.93%
United States Virgin Islands	Cruz Bay	12:59:39	14:27:39	15:46:29	2:47	91.65%
Grenada	St. George's	13:00:00	14:28:01	15:46:10	2:46	86.83%
British Virgin Islands	Road Town	13:00:12	14:28:03	15:46:44	2:47	91.63%
British Virgin Islands	Spanish Town	13:00:40	14:28:26	15:47:00	2:46	91.90%
Caribbean Netherlands	The Bottom	13:02:21	14:30:01	15:48:13	2:46	96.99%
Saint Vincent and the Grenadines	Kingstown	13:02:27	14:30:03	15:47:44	2:45	89.87%
Caribbean Netherlands	Oranjestad	13:02:49	14:30:25	15:48:29	2:46	97.93%
Saint Martin	Marigot	13:03:18	14:30:39	15:48:35	2:45	95.75%
Sint Maarten	Philipsburg	13:03:20	14:30:42	15:48:37	2:45	95.95%
Saint Kitts and Nevis	Basseterre	13:03:12	14:30:45	15:48:43	2:46	98.95%
Anguilla	The Valley	13:03:32	14:30:48	15:48:39	2:45	95.23%
Saint Barthélemy	Gustavia	13:03:38	14:30:58	15:48:48	2:45	96.77%
Saint Lucia	Castries	13:03:53	14:31:15	15:48:41	2:45	92.56%
Dominica	Roseau	13:04:11	14:31:37	15:49:11	2:45	97.88%
Martinique	Fort-de-France	13:04:16	14:31:36	15:49:03	2:45	94.89%
Antigua and Barbuda	Codrington	13:05:44	14:32:38	15:49:54	2:44	99.27%
Barbados	Bridgetown	13:06:37	14:32:57	15:49:18	2:43	86.58%
Spain	Los Llanos de Aridane	18:10:19	19:06:57	19:09:27 (sunset)	0:59	94.56%

== In popular culture ==
The 2001 Japanese film Orozco the Embalmer briefly featured the total eclipse as seen from Colombia.

== Eclipse details ==
Shown below are two tables displaying details about this particular solar eclipse. The first table outlines times at which the Moon's penumbra or umbra attains the specific parameter, and the second table describes various other parameters pertaining to this eclipse.

February 26, 1998 Solar Eclipse Times
Event	Time (UTC)
First Penumbral External Contact	1998 February 26 at 14:51:26.2 UTC
First Umbral External Contact	1998 February 26 at 15:47:48.6 UTC
First Central Line	1998 February 26 at 15:48:32.9 UTC
First Umbral Internal Contact	1998 February 26 at 15:49:17.2 UTC
First Penumbral Internal Contact	1998 February 26 at 16:48:32.4 UTC
Ecliptic Conjunction	1998 February 26 at 17:26:58.5 UTC
Greatest Duration	1998 February 26 at 17:28:01.9 UTC
Greatest Eclipse	1998 February 26 at 17:29:26.7 UTC
Equatorial Conjunction	1998 February 26 at 17:36:39.9 UTC
Last Penumbral Internal Contact	1998 February 26 at 18:10:10.1 UTC
Last Umbral Internal Contact	1998 February 26 at 19:09:29.1 UTC
Last Central Line	1998 February 26 at 19:10:14.8 UTC
Last Umbral External Contact	1998 February 26 at 19:11:00.5 UTC
Last Penumbral External Contact	1998 February 26 at 20:07:20.7 UTC

February 26, 1998 Solar Eclipse Parameters
Parameter	Value
Eclipse Magnitude	1.04411
Eclipse Obscuration	1.09017
Gamma	0.23909
Sun Right Ascension	22h38m18.9s
Sun Declination	-08°36'05.1"
Sun Semi-Diameter	16'09.1"
Sun Equatorial Horizontal Parallax	08.9"
Moon Right Ascension	22h38m02.5s
Moon Declination	-08°22'08.5"
Moon Semi-Diameter	16'35.2"
Moon Equatorial Horizontal Parallax	1°00'52.6"
ΔT	63.0 s

== Eclipse season ==
This eclipse is part of an eclipse season, a period, roughly every six months, when eclipses occur. Only two (or occasionally three) eclipse seasons occur each year, and each season lasts about 35 days and repeats just short of six months (173 days) later; thus two full eclipse seasons always occur each year. Either two or three eclipses happen each eclipse season. In the sequence below, each eclipse is separated by a fortnight.

Eclipse season of February–March 1998
February 26 Descending node (new moon)	March 13 Ascending node (full moon)
Total solar eclipse Solar Saros 130	Penumbral lunar eclipse Lunar Saros 142

== Related eclipses ==
=== Eclipses in 1998 ===
- A total solar eclipse on February 26.
- A penumbral lunar eclipse on March 13.
- A penumbral lunar eclipse on August 8.
- An annular solar eclipse on August 22.
- A penumbral lunar eclipse on September 6.

=== Metonic ===
- Preceded by: Solar eclipse of May 10, 1994
- Followed by: Solar eclipse of December 14, 2001

=== Tzolkinex ===
- Preceded by: Solar eclipse of January 15, 1991
- Followed by: Solar eclipse of April 8, 2005

=== Half-Saros ===
- Preceded by: Lunar eclipse of February 20, 1989
- Followed by: Lunar eclipse of March 3, 2007

=== Tritos ===
- Preceded by: Solar eclipse of March 29, 1987
- Followed by: Solar eclipse of January 26, 2009

=== Solar Saros 130 ===
- Preceded by: Solar eclipse of February 16, 1980
- Followed by: Solar eclipse of March 9, 2016

=== Inex ===
- Preceded by: Solar eclipse of March 18, 1969
- Followed by: Solar eclipse of February 6, 2027

=== Triad ===
- Preceded by: Solar eclipse of April 28, 1911
- Followed by: Solar eclipse of December 27, 2084

=== Solar eclipses of 1997–2000 ===
This eclipse is a member of a semester series. An eclipse in a semester series of solar eclipses repeats approximately every 177 days and 4 hours (a semester) at alternating nodes of the Moon's orbit.

The partial solar eclipses on July 1, 2000 and December 25, 2000 occur in the next lunar year eclipse set.

Solar eclipse series sets from 1997 to 2000
Descending node			Ascending node		
Saros	Map	Gamma	Saros	Map	Gamma
120 Totality in Chita, Russia	March 9, 1997 Total	0.9183	125	September 2, 1997 Partial	−1.0352
130 Totality near Guadeloupe	February 26, 1998 Total	0.2391	135	August 22, 1998 Annular	−0.2644
140	February 16, 1999 Annular	−0.4726	145 Totality in France	August 11, 1999 Total	0.5062
150	February 5, 2000 Partial	−1.2233	155	July 31, 2000 Partial	1.2166

=== Saros 130 ===
This eclipse is a part of Saros series 130, repeating every 18 years, 11 days, and containing 73 events. The series started with a partial solar eclipse on August 20, 1096. It contains total eclipses from April 5, 1475 through July 18, 2232. There are no annular or hybrid eclipses in this set. The series ends at member 73 as a partial eclipse on October 25, 2394. Its eclipses are tabulated in three columns; every third eclipse in the same column is one exeligmos apart, so they all cast shadows over approximately the same parts of the Earth.

The longest duration of totality was produced by member 30 at 6 minutes, 41 seconds on July 11, 1619. All eclipses in this series occur at the Moon’s descending node of orbit.

Series members 41–62 occur between 1801 and 2200:
41	42	43
November 9, 1817	November 20, 1835	November 30, 1853
44	45	46
December 12, 1871	December 22, 1889	January 3, 1908
47	48	49
January 14, 1926	January 25, 1944	February 5, 1962
50	51	52
February 16, 1980	February 26, 1998	March 9, 2016
53	54	55
March 20, 2034	March 30, 2052	April 11, 2070
56	57	58
April 21, 2088	May 3, 2106	May 14, 2124
59	60	61
May 25, 2142	June 4, 2160	June 16, 2178
62
June 26, 2196

=== Metonic series ===
The metonic series repeats eclipses every 19 years (6939.69 days), lasting about 5 cycles. Eclipses occur in nearly the same calendar date. In addition, the octon subseries repeats 1/5 of that or every 3.8 years (1387.94 days). All eclipses in this table occur at the Moon's descending node.

21 eclipse events between July 22, 1971 and July 22, 2047
July 22	May 9–11	February 26–27	December 14–15	October 2–3
116	118	120	122	124
July 22, 1971	May 11, 1975	February 26, 1979	December 15, 1982	October 3, 1986
126	128	130	132	134
July 22, 1990	May 10, 1994	February 26, 1998	December 14, 2001	October 3, 2005
136	138	140	142	144
July 22, 2009	May 10, 2013	February 26, 2017	December 14, 2020	October 2, 2024
146	148	150	152	154
July 22, 2028	May 9, 2032	February 27, 2036	December 15, 2039	October 3, 2043
156
July 22, 2047

=== Tritos series ===
This eclipse is a part of a tritos cycle, repeating at alternating nodes every 135 synodic months (≈ 3986.63 days, or 11 years minus 1 month). Their appearance and longitude are irregular due to a lack of synchronization with the anomalistic month (period of perigee), but groupings of 3 tritos cycles (≈ 33 years minus 3 months) come close (≈ 434.044 anomalistic months), so eclipses are similar in these groupings.

Series members between 1801 and 2200
September 8, 1801 (Saros 112)	August 7, 1812 (Saros 113)	July 8, 1823 (Saros 114)	June 7, 1834 (Saros 115)	May 6, 1845 (Saros 116)
April 5, 1856 (Saros 117)	March 6, 1867 (Saros 118)	February 2, 1878 (Saros 119)	January 1, 1889 (Saros 120)	December 3, 1899 (Saros 121)
November 2, 1910 (Saros 122)	October 1, 1921 (Saros 123)	August 31, 1932 (Saros 124)	August 1, 1943 (Saros 125)	June 30, 1954 (Saros 126)
May 30, 1965 (Saros 127)	April 29, 1976 (Saros 128)	March 29, 1987 (Saros 129)	February 26, 1998 (Saros 130)	January 26, 2009 (Saros 131)
December 26, 2019 (Saros 132)	November 25, 2030 (Saros 133)	October 25, 2041 (Saros 134)	September 22, 2052 (Saros 135)	August 24, 2063 (Saros 136)
July 24, 2074 (Saros 137)	June 22, 2085 (Saros 138)	May 22, 2096 (Saros 139)	April 23, 2107 (Saros 140)	March 22, 2118 (Saros 141)
February 18, 2129 (Saros 142)	January 20, 2140 (Saros 143)	December 19, 2150 (Saros 144)	November 17, 2161 (Saros 145)	October 17, 2172 (Saros 146)
September 16, 2183 (Saros 147)	August 16, 2194 (Saros 148)			

=== Inex series ===
This eclipse is a part of the long period inex cycle, repeating at alternating nodes, every 358 synodic months (≈ 10,571.95 days, or 29 years minus 20 days). Their appearance and longitude are irregular due to a lack of synchronization with the anomalistic month (period of perigee). However, groupings of 3 inex cycles (≈ 87 years minus 2 months) comes close (≈ 1,151.02 anomalistic months), so eclipses are similar in these groupings.

Series members between 1801 and 2200
June 26, 1824 (Saros 124)	June 6, 1853 (Saros 125)	May 17, 1882 (Saros 126)
April 28, 1911 (Saros 127)	April 7, 1940 (Saros 128)	March 18, 1969 (Saros 129)
February 26, 1998 (Saros 130)	February 6, 2027 (Saros 131)	January 16, 2056 (Saros 132)
December 27, 2084 (Saros 133)	December 8, 2113 (Saros 134)	November 17, 2142 (Saros 135)
October 29, 2171 (Saros 136)	October 9, 2200 (Saros 137)	
