= Solar eclipse of February 6, 2027 =

Future annular solar eclipse

- Annular eclipse
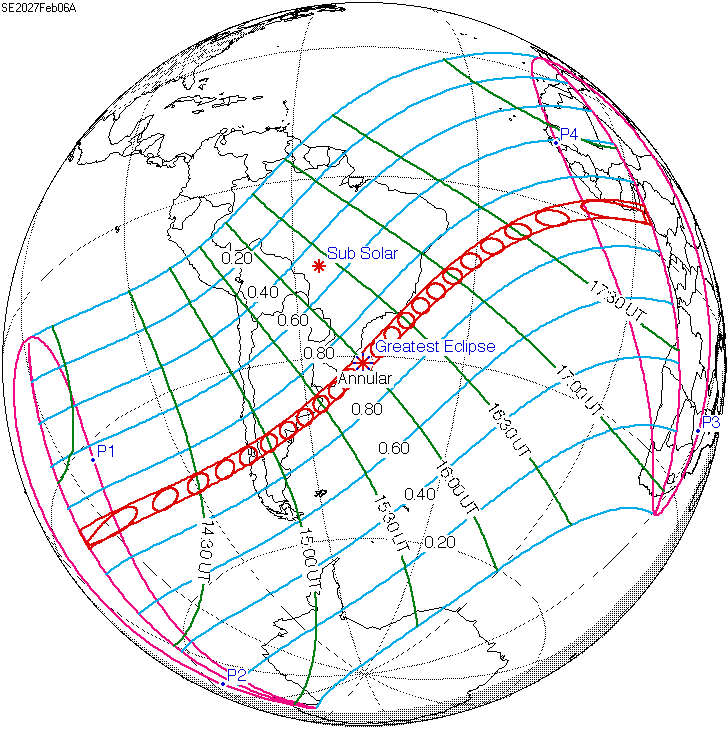
- Map
- Gamma: −0.2952
- Magnitude: 0.9281

Maximum eclipse
- Duration: 471 s (7 min 51 s)
- Coordinates: 31.3°S 48.5°W
- Max. width of band: 282 km (175 mi)

Times (UTC)
- Greatest eclipse: 16:00:48

References
- Saros: 131 (51 of 70)
- Catalog # (SE5000): 9567

An annular solar eclipse will occur at the Moon's ascending node of orbit on Saturday, February 6, 2027, with a magnitude of 0.9281. A solar eclipse occurs when the Moon passes between Earth and the Sun, thereby totally or partly obscuring the image of the Sun for a viewer on Earth. An annular solar eclipse occurs when the Moon's apparent diameter is smaller than the Sun's, blocking most of the Sun's light and causing the Sun to look like an annulus (ring). An annular eclipse appears as a partial eclipse over a region of the Earth thousands of kilometres wide. Occurring about 3.2 days after apogee (on February 3, 2027, at 13:30 UTC), the Moon's apparent diameter will be smaller.

The path of annularity will first pass through Chile (including the city of Castro and the island Melinka) and Argentina (including the city of Viedma), then scraping the east coast of Uruguay (including the city of Punta del Este) and Brazil (including the city of Santa Vitória do Palmar). The eclipse will then pass across the South Atlantic Ocean, terminating on the West African coast, where it will pass over the southeastern Ivory Coast (including the city of Abidjan), southern Ghana (including the capital Accra), southern Togo (including the capital Lomé), southern Benin (including Cotonou and the capital Porto-Novo), and southwestern Nigeria (including Lagos). A partial eclipse will be visible in much of South America, parts of Antarctica, and much of the western half of Africa.

== Images ==
Animated path

== Eclipse timing ==
=== Places experiencing annular eclipse ===
Solar Eclipse of February 6, 2027 (Local Times)
Country or territory	City or place	Start of partial eclipse	Start of annular eclipse	Maximum eclipse	End of annular eclipse	End of partial eclipse	Duration of annularity (min:s)	Duration of eclipse (hr:min)	Maximum coverage
Brazil	Santa Vitória do Palmar	10:57:24	12:42:03	12:44:19	12:46:35	14:26:23	4:32	3:28	86.25%
Argentina	Esquel	10:23:08	11:52:33	11:56:18	12:00:03	13:36:04	7:30	3:13	85.78%
Argentina	Viedma	10:34:47	12:09:58	12:13:33	12:17:08	13:55:01	7:10	3:20	86.01%
Argentina	Bahía Blanca	10:36:35	12:15:17	12:17:25	12:19:33	14:00:19	4:16	3:24	86.07%
Argentina	Tandil	10:42:46	12:23:23	12:25:51	12:28:18	14:08:48	4:55	3:26	86.14%
Argentina	Mar del Plata	10:45:16	12:24:20	12:28:09	12:31:57	14:10:07	7:37	3:25	86.15%
Uruguay	Punta del Este	10:52:52	12:36:03	12:38:46	12:41:29	14:21:11	5:26	3:28	86.23%
Uruguay	Maldonado	10:52:52	12:36:12	12:38:46	12:41:21	14:21:13	5:09	3:28	86.23%
Uruguay	Rocha	10:54:34	12:38:20	12:40:52	12:43:25	14:23:10	5:05	3:29	86.24%
Nigeria	Ibadan	17:45:01	18:51:00	18:51:25	18:53:40	18:53:40 (sunset)	2:40	1:09	83.77%
Ghana	Cape Coast	16:40:53	17:49:19	17:52:08	17:54:57	18:16:47 (sunset)	5:38	1:36	84.02%
Ghana	Accra	16:41:49	17:49:39	17:52:24	17:55:10	18:12:09 (sunset)	5:31	1:30	83.96%
Ivory Coast	Abidjan	16:39:46	17:51:47	17:52:29	17:53:11	18:27:40 (sunset)	1:24	1:48	84.13%
Nigeria	Lagos	17:43:59	18:49:45	18:52:33	18:55:21	18:56:56 (sunset)	5:36	1:13	83.79%
Benin	Cotonou	17:43:38	18:49:57	18:52:40	18:55:23	19:00:40 (sunset)	5:26	1:17	83.83%
Togo	Lomé	16:42:58	17:50:02	17:52:41	17:55:20	18:05:48 (sunset)	5:18	1:23	83.89%
Benin	Porto-Novo	17:43:48	18:50:03	18:52:44	18:55:24	18:59:48 (sunset)	5:21	1:16	83.82%
Nigeria	Abeokuta	17:44:40	18:50:53	18:53:05	18:55:17	18:56:08 (sunset)	4:24	1:11	83.78%
Benin	Bohicon	17:44:19	18:51:58	18:53:21	18:54:46	19:01:14 (sunset)	2:48	1:17	83.83%

=== Places experiencing partial eclipse ===
Solar Eclipse of February 6, 2027 (Local Times)
Country or territory	City or place	Start of partial eclipse	Maximum eclipse	End of partial eclipse	Duration of eclipse (hr:min)	Maximum coverage
Chile	Santiago	10:26:43	12:04:26	13:49:10	3:22	61.55%
Falkland Islands	Stanley	10:47:10	12:13:16	13:40:16	2:53	53.48%
Argentina	Buenos Aires	10:46:25	12:31:48	14:15:45	3:29	81.94%
Uruguay	Montevideo	10:50:23	12:36:07	14:19:07	3:29	85.71%
Paraguay	Asunción	11:03:40	12:52:38	14:35:35	3:32	58.15%
Brazil	Arraial do Cabo	11:43:11	13:31:34	15:06:12	3:23	86.15%
Brazil	Rio de Janeiro	11:40:27	13:29:29	15:04:56	3:24	84.21%
Democratic Republic of the Congo	Kinshasa	17:39:04	18:18:50	18:21:05 (sunset)	0:42	37.87%
Cameroon	Yaoundé	17:43:34	18:24:52	18:27:06 (sunset)	0:44	47.28%
Angola	Luanda	17:35:58	18:32:09	18:34:31 (sunset)	0:59	41.84%
Saint Helena, Ascension and Tristan da Cunha	Georgetown	16:11:13	17:33:39	18:44:39	2:33	73.83%
Nigeria	Abuja	17:47:11	18:35:11	18:37:27 (sunset)	0:50	58.09%
Equatorial Guinea	Malabo	17:43:01	18:35:58	18:38:12 (sunset)	0:55	64.81%
Gabon	Libreville	17:40:38	18:37:00	18:39:14 (sunset)	0:59	63.86%
Nigeria	Benin City	17:44:28	18:45:11	18:47:56 (sunset)	1:03	79.22%
São Tomé and Príncipe	São Tomé	16:39:42	17:46:35	17:50:12 (sunset)	1:11	71.00%
Niger	Niamey	17:51:00	18:51:32	18:53:50 (sunset)	1:03	64.67%
Liberia	Monrovia	16:37:10	17:53:02	18:53:42 (sunset)	2:17	75.31%
Ghana	Kumasi	16:42:30	17:53:30	18:16:31 (sunset)	1:34	83.32%
Togo	Atakpamé	16:44:24	17:53:47	18:04:36 (sunset)	1:20	83.28%
Ivory Coast	Yamoussoukro	16:41:00	17:53:49	18:31:01 (sunset)	1:50	79.99%
Benin	Savè	17:45:18	18:53:54	18:58:36 (sunset)	1:13	83.01%
Benin	Parakou	17:46:40	18:54:17	18:56:33 (sunset)	1:10	79.78%
Sierra Leone	Freetown	16:39:10	17:54:42	19:00:47	2:22	65.98%
Togo	Sokodé	16:45:56	17:54:51	18:02:54 (sunset)	1:17	79.66%
Guinea	Conakry	16:40:37	17:55:32	19:01:10	2:21	62.38%
Guinea-Bissau	Bissau	16:43:53	17:57:12	19:01:38	2:23	53.10%
Burkina Faso	Ouagadougou	16:49:09	17:57:21	18:09:43 (sunset)	1:21	67.18%
Gambia	Banjul	16:46:30	17:58:15	19:01:32	2:15	47.25%
Mali	Bamako	16:47:53	17:58:19	18:35:17 (sunset)	1:47	59.87%
Senegal	Dakar	16:48:39	17:59:00	19:01:12	2:13	42.69%

== Eclipse details ==
Shown below are two tables displaying details about this particular solar eclipse. The first table outlines times at which the Moon's penumbra or umbra attains the specific parameter, and the second table describes various other parameters pertaining to this eclipse.

February 6, 2027 Solar Eclipse Times
Event	Time (UTC)
First Penumbral External Contact	2027 February 06 at 12:58:47.0 UTC
First Umbral External Contact	2027 February 06 at 14:05:05.6 UTC
First Central Line	2027 February 06 at 14:08:16.3 UTC
First Umbral Internal Contact	2027 February 06 at 14:11:27.4 UTC
First Penumbral Internal Contact	2027 February 06 at 15:24:40.4 UTC
Greatest Duration	2027 February 06 at 15:43:00.4 UTC
Equatorial Conjunction	2027 February 06 at 15:45:38.2 UTC
Ecliptic Conjunction	2027 February 06 at 15:57:16.2 UTC
Greatest Eclipse	2027 February 06 at 16:00:47.7 UTC
Last Penumbral Internal Contact	2027 February 06 at 16:37:18.3 UTC
Last Umbral Internal Contact	2027 February 06 at 17:50:19.1 UTC
Last Central Line	2027 February 06 at 17:53:28.3 UTC
Last Umbral External Contact	2027 February 06 at 17:56:36.8 UTC
Last Penumbral External Contact	2027 February 06 at 19:02:50.3 UTC

February 6, 2027 Solar Eclipse Parameters
Parameter	Value
Eclipse Magnitude	0.92811
Eclipse Obscuration	0.86139
Gamma	−0.29515
Sun Right Ascension	21h20m17.6s
Sun Declination	-15°32'54.5"
Sun Semi-Diameter	16'13.1"
Sun Equatorial Horizontal Parallax	08.9"
Moon Right Ascension	21h20m44.2s
Moon Declination	-15°47'36.0"
Moon Semi-Diameter	14'50.2"
Moon Equatorial Horizontal Parallax	0°54'27.0"
ΔT	72.6 s

== Eclipse season ==
This eclipse is part of an eclipse season, a period, roughly every six months, when eclipses occur. Only two (or occasionally three) eclipse seasons occur each year, and each season lasts about 35 days and repeats just short of six months (173 days) later; thus two full eclipse seasons always occur each year. Either two or three eclipses happen each eclipse season. In the sequence below, each eclipse is separated by a fortnight.

Eclipse season of February 2027
February 6 Ascending node (new moon)	February 20 Descending node (full moon)
Annular solar eclipse Solar Saros 131	Penumbral lunar eclipse Lunar Saros 143

== Related eclipses ==
=== Eclipses in 2027 ===
- An annular solar eclipse on February 6.
- A penumbral lunar eclipse on February 20.
- A penumbral lunar eclipse on July 18.
- A total solar eclipse on August 2.
- A penumbral lunar eclipse on August 17.

=== Metonic ===
- Preceded by: Solar eclipse of April 20, 2023
- Followed by: Solar eclipse of November 25, 2030

=== Tzolkinex ===
- Preceded by: Solar eclipse of December 26, 2019
- Followed by: Solar eclipse of March 20, 2034

=== Half-Saros ===
- Preceded by: Lunar eclipse of January 31, 2018
- Followed by: Lunar eclipse of February 11, 2036

=== Tritos ===
- Preceded by: Solar eclipse of March 9, 2016
- Followed by: Solar eclipse of January 5, 2038

=== Solar Saros 131 ===
- Preceded by: Solar eclipse of January 26, 2009
- Followed by: Solar eclipse of February 16, 2045

=== Inex ===
- Preceded by: Solar eclipse of February 26, 1998
- Followed by: Solar eclipse of January 16, 2056

=== Triad ===
- Preceded by: Solar eclipse of April 7, 1940
- Followed by: Solar eclipse of December 8, 2113

=== Solar eclipses of 2026–2029 ===
This eclipse is a member of a semester series. An eclipse in a semester series of solar eclipses repeats approximately every 177 days and 4 hours (a semester) at alternating nodes of the Moon's orbit.

The partial solar eclipses on June 12, 2029 and December 5, 2029 occur in the next lunar year eclipse set.

Solar eclipse series sets from 2026 to 2029
Ascending node			Descending node		
Saros	Map	Gamma	Saros	Map	Gamma
121	February 17, 2026 Annular	−0.97427	126	August 12, 2026 Total	0.89774
131	February 6, 2027 Annular	−0.29515	136	August 2, 2027 Total	0.14209
141	January 26, 2028 Annular	0.39014	146	July 22, 2028 Total	−0.60557
151	January 14, 2029 Partial	1.05532	156	July 11, 2029 Partial	−1.41908

=== Saros 131 ===
This eclipse is a part of Saros series 131, repeating every 18 years, 11 days, and containing 70 events. The series started with a partial solar eclipse on August 1, 1125. It contains total eclipses from March 27, 1522 through May 30, 1612; hybrid eclipses from June 10, 1630 through July 24, 1702; and annular eclipses from August 4, 1720 through June 18, 2243. The series ends at member 70 as a partial eclipse on September 2, 2369. Its eclipses are tabulated in three columns; every third eclipse in the same column is one exeligmos apart, so they all cast shadows over approximately the same parts of the Earth.

The longest duration of totality was produced by member 28 at 58 seconds on May 30, 1612, and the longest duration of annularity was produced by member 50 at 7 minutes, 54 seconds on January 26, 2009. All eclipses in this series occur at the Moon’s ascending node of orbit.

Series members 39–60 occur between 1801 and 2200:
39	40	41
September 28, 1810	October 9, 1828	October 20, 1846
42	43	44
October 30, 1864	November 10, 1882	November 22, 1900
45	46	47
December 3, 1918	December 13, 1936	December 25, 1954
48	49	50
January 4, 1973	January 15, 1991	January 26, 2009
51	52	53
February 6, 2027	February 16, 2045	February 28, 2063
54	55	56
March 10, 2081	March 21, 2099	April 2, 2117
57	58	59
April 13, 2135	April 23, 2153	May 5, 2171
60
May 15, 2189

=== Metonic series ===
The metonic series repeats eclipses every 19 years (6939.69 days), lasting about 5 cycles. Eclipses occur in nearly the same calendar date. In addition, the octon subseries repeats 1/5 of that or every 3.8 years (1387.94 days). All eclipses in this table occur at the Moon's ascending node.

21 eclipse events between July 1, 2000 and July 1, 2076
July 1–2	April 19–20	February 5–7	November 24–25	September 12–13
117	119	121	123	125
July 1, 2000	April 19, 2004	February 7, 2008	November 25, 2011	September 13, 2015
127	129	131	133	135
July 2, 2019	April 20, 2023	February 6, 2027	November 25, 2030	September 12, 2034
137	139	141	143	145
July 2, 2038	April 20, 2042	February 5, 2046	November 25, 2049	September 12, 2053
147	149	151	153	155
July 1, 2057	April 20, 2061	February 5, 2065	November 24, 2068	September 12, 2072
157
July 1, 2076

=== Tritos series ===
This eclipse is a part of a tritos cycle, repeating at alternating nodes every 135 synodic months (≈ 3986.63 days, or 11 years minus 1 month). Their appearance and longitude are irregular due to a lack of synchronization with the anomalistic month (period of perigee), but groupings of 3 tritos cycles (≈ 33 years minus 3 months) come close (≈ 434.044 anomalistic months), so eclipses are similar in these groupings.

Series members between 1801 and 2200
October 19, 1808 (Saros 111)	September 19, 1819 (Saros 112)	August 18, 1830 (Saros 113)	July 18, 1841 (Saros 114)	June 17, 1852 (Saros 115)
May 17, 1863 (Saros 116)	April 16, 1874 (Saros 117)	March 16, 1885 (Saros 118)	February 13, 1896 (Saros 119)	January 14, 1907 (Saros 120)
December 14, 1917 (Saros 121)	November 12, 1928 (Saros 122)	October 12, 1939 (Saros 123)	September 12, 1950 (Saros 124)	August 11, 1961 (Saros 125)
July 10, 1972 (Saros 126)	June 11, 1983 (Saros 127)	May 10, 1994 (Saros 128)	April 8, 2005 (Saros 129)	March 9, 2016 (Saros 130)
February 6, 2027 (Saros 131)	January 5, 2038 (Saros 132)	December 5, 2048 (Saros 133)	November 5, 2059 (Saros 134)	October 4, 2070 (Saros 135)
September 3, 2081 (Saros 136)	August 3, 2092 (Saros 137)	July 4, 2103 (Saros 138)	June 3, 2114 (Saros 139)	May 3, 2125 (Saros 140)
April 1, 2136 (Saros 141)	March 2, 2147 (Saros 142)	January 30, 2158 (Saros 143)	December 29, 2168 (Saros 144)	November 28, 2179 (Saros 145)
October 29, 2190 (Saros 146)

=== Inex series ===
This eclipse is a part of the long period inex cycle, repeating at alternating nodes, every 358 synodic months (≈ 10,571.95 days, or 29 years minus 20 days). Their appearance and longitude are irregular due to a lack of synchronization with the anomalistic month (period of perigee). However, groupings of 3 inex cycles (≈ 87 years minus 2 months) comes close (≈ 1,151.02 anomalistic months), so eclipses are similar in these groupings.

Series members between 1801 and 2200
June 26, 1824 (Saros 124)	June 6, 1853 (Saros 125)	May 17, 1882 (Saros 126)
April 28, 1911 (Saros 127)	April 7, 1940 (Saros 128)	March 18, 1969 (Saros 129)
February 26, 1998 (Saros 130)	February 6, 2027 (Saros 131)	January 16, 2056 (Saros 132)
December 27, 2084 (Saros 133)	December 8, 2113 (Saros 134)	November 17, 2142 (Saros 135)
October 29, 2171 (Saros 136)	October 9, 2200 (Saros 137)	
