= Solar eclipse of January 5, 2038 =

Future annular solar eclipse

- Annular eclipse
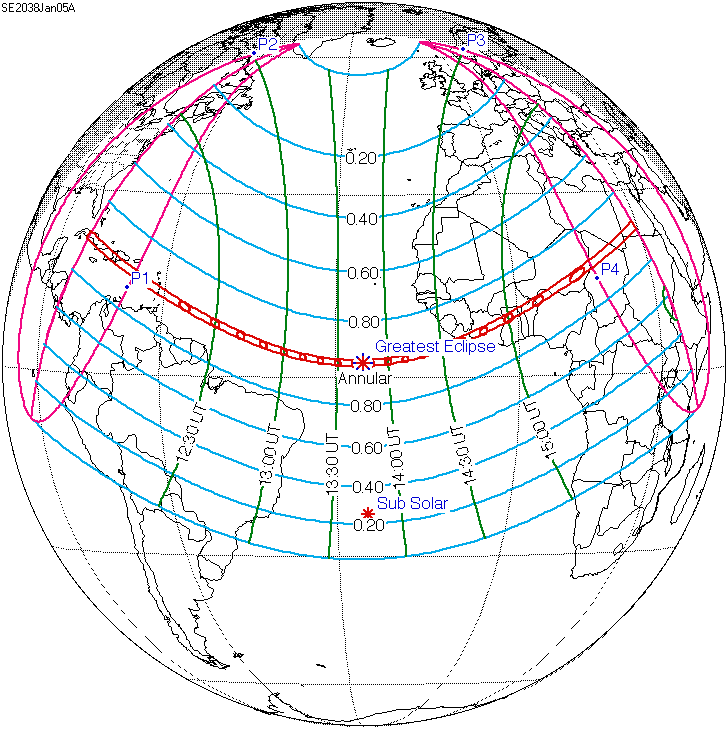
- Map
- Gamma: 0.4169
- Magnitude: 0.9728

Maximum eclipse
- Duration: 198 s (3 min 18 s)
- Coordinates: 2.1°N 25.4°W
- Max. width of band: 107 km (66 mi)

Times (UTC)
- Greatest eclipse: 13:47:11

References
- Saros: 132 (47 of 71)
- Catalog # (SE5000): 9592

An annular solar eclipse will occur at the Moon's descending node of orbit on Tuesday, January 5, 2038, with a magnitude of 0.9728. A solar eclipse occurs when the Moon passes between Earth and the Sun, thereby totally or partly obscuring the image of the Sun for a viewer on Earth. An annular solar eclipse occurs when the Moon's apparent diameter is smaller than the Sun's, blocking most of the Sun's light and causing the Sun to look like an annulus (ring). An annular eclipse appears as a partial eclipse over a region of the Earth thousands of kilometres wide. The Moon's apparent diameter will be near the average diameter because it will occur 6.8 days after perigee (on December 29, 2037, at 18:50 UTC) and 7 days before apogee (on January 12, 2038, at 14:00 UTC).

Annularity will be visible from parts of Cuba, Haiti, the Dominican Republic, Saint Lucia, Saint Vincent and the Grenadines, Barbados, Liberia, Côte d'Ivoire, Ghana, Togo, Benin, northwestern Nigeria, Niger, Chad, southeastern Libya, northwestern Sudan, and southwestern Egypt. A partial eclipse will be visible for parts of eastern North America, Central America, the Caribbean, northern South America, Europe, and the northern two-thirds of Africa.

== Images ==
Animated path

== Eclipse timing ==
=== Places experiencing annular eclipse ===
Solar Eclipse of January 5, 2038 (Local Times)
Country or territory	City or place	Start of partial eclipse	Start of annular eclipse	Maximum eclipse	End of annular eclipse	End of partial eclipse	Duration of annularity (min:s)	Duration of eclipse (hr:min)	Maximum coverage
Cuba	Trinidad	06:59:37 (sunrise)	07:03:20	07:04:42	07:06:03	08:16:10	2:43	1:17	92.11%
Cuba	Sancti Spíritus	06:57:44 (sunrise)	07:03:32	07:04:52	07:06:11	08:16:42	2:39	1:19	92.14%
Cuba	Santa Clara	07:00:44 (sunrise)	07:03:53	07:04:59	07:06:04	08:16:27	2:11	1:16	92.10%
Cuba	Camagüey	06:50:34 (sunrise)	07:03:45	07:05:00	07:06:15	08:17:55	2:30	1:27	92.22%
Cuba	Santiago de Cuba	06:39:39 (sunrise)	07:03:43	07:05:05	07:06:28	08:19:36	2:45	1:40	92.35%
Cuba	Holguín	06:43:00 (sunrise)	07:04:21	07:05:18	07:06:13	08:19:27	1:52	1:36	92.31%
Haiti	Port-au-Prince	06:22:56 (sunrise)	07:04:39	07:06:02	07:07:27	08:23:25	2:48	2:00	92.55%
Haiti	Gonaïves	06:26:00 (sunrise)	07:05:46	07:06:11	07:06:36	08:23:13	0:50	1:57	92.51%
Dominican Republic	San Juan de la Maguana	07:18:58 (sunrise)	08:06:31	08:06:43	08:06:55	09:25:01	0:24	2:06	92.55%
Saint Vincent and the Grenadines	Kingstown	06:59:41	08:12:16	08:13:32	08:14:46	09:42:22	2:30	2:43	93.24%
Saint Lucia	Castries	06:59:53	08:13:37	08:13:52	08:14:07	09:42:53	0:30	2:43	93.23%
Saint Lucia	Vieux Fort	06:59:51	08:12:42	08:13:53	08:15:03	09:42:58	2:21	2:43	93.24%
Barbados	Bridgetown	07:00:13	08:14:11	08:15:21	08:16:31	09:46:04	2:20	2:46	93.32%
Ivory Coast	Daloa	12:58:46	14:47:43	14:49:15	14:50:47	16:20:08	3:04	3:21	94.08%
Ivory Coast	Bouaké	13:04:10	14:51:18	14:52:50	14:54:22	16:21:55	3:04	3:18	93.98%
Ivory Coast	Dabakala	13:06:33	14:53:30	14:54:22	14:55:15	16:22:41	1:45	3:16	93.93%
Ghana	Tamale	13:18:58	15:00:28	15:01:58	15:03:28	16:26:12	3:00	3:07	93.72%
Togo	Mango	13:23:27	15:03:08	15:04:34	15:06:00	16:27:21	2:52	3:04	93.62%
Benin	Natitingou	14:26:11	16:04:46	16:06:07	16:07:29	17:28:00	2:43	3:02	93.58%
Benin	Kandi	14:31:00	16:07:22	16:08:47	16:10:14	17:29:06	2:52	2:58	93.47%
Nigeria	Birnin Kebbi	14:34:53	16:09:55	16:10:50	16:11:47	17:29:52	1:52	2:55	93.37%
Nigeria	Sokoto	14:37:49	16:11:49	16:12:22	16:12:55	17:30:24	1:06	2:53	93.29%
Niger	Maradi	14:42:37	16:13:24	16:14:51	16:16:19	17:31:16	2:55	2:49	93.18%
Nigeria	Katsina	14:43:47	16:14:56	16:15:28	16:16:02	17:31:29	1:06	2:48	93.17%
Niger	Zinder	14:47:10	16:16:04	16:17:08	16:18:12	17:31:58	2:08	2:45	93.07%

=== Places experiencing partial eclipse ===
Solar Eclipse of January 5, 2038 (Local Times)
Country or territory	City or place	Start of partial eclipse	Maximum eclipse	End of partial eclipse	Duration of eclipse (hr:min)	Maximum coverage
Jamaica	Kingston	06:39:43 (sunrise)	07:04:04	08:17:41	1:38	87.15%
Haiti	Labadee	06:24:51 (sunrise)	07:06:32	08:23:54	1:59	91.44%
Haiti	Cap-Haïtien	06:24:38 (sunrise)	07:06:33	08:23:57	1:59	91.46%
Bahamas	Nassau	06:55:31 (sunrise)	07:07:06	08:19:53	1:24	81.76%
Dominican Republic	Santo Domingo	07:13:10 (sunrise)	08:07:21	09:26:48	2:14	92.25%
Venezuela	Caracas	06:59:11	08:08:12	09:30:02	2:31	77.38%
Puerto Rico	San Juan	07:00:00	08:10:02	09:32:54	2:35	87.13%
United States	Miami	07:08:22 (sunrise)	07:11:00	08:17:44	1:09	81.23%
Saint Kitts and Nevis	Basseterre	07:00:20	08:12:43	09:39:07	2:39	85.93%
Grenada	St. George's	06:59:30	08:12:54	09:41:08	2:42	90.58%
Trinidad and Tobago	Port of Spain	06:59:39	08:13:08	09:41:35	2:42	86.44%
Guadeloupe	Basse-Terre	07:00:09	08:13:25	09:41:11	2:41	88.64%
Dominica	Roseau	07:00:03	08:13:38	09:41:57	2:42	90.35%
Martinique	Fort-de-France	06:59:59	08:13:52	09:42:40	2:43	91.99%
Cuba	Havana	07:11:46 (sunrise)	07:14:57	08:14:50	1:03	77.35%
Guyana	Georgetown	07:01:37	08:17:32	09:49:36	2:48	78.94%
Suriname	Paramaribo	08:03:13	09:22:00	10:58:03	2:55	80.34%
French Guiana	Cayenne	08:05:09	09:26:51	11:06:50	3:02	81.75%
Guinea	Conakry	12:33:37	14:29:49	16:09:09	3:36	79.39%
Sierra Leone	Freetown	12:34:39	14:31:03	16:10:11	3:36	83.25%
Liberia	Monrovia	12:42:29	14:37:38	16:14:07	3:32	93.05%
Ivory Coast	Yamoussoukro	13:02:58	14:51:59	16:21:27	3:18	93.86%
Burkina Faso	Ouagadougou	13:18:06	15:01:06	16:25:33	3:07	86.17%
Ghana	Accra	13:20:11	15:02:00	16:25:24	3:05	82.32%
Togo	Lomé	13:24:53	15:04:46	16:26:38	3:02	81.98%
Egypt	Cairo	16:14:31	17:06:24	17:09:13 (sunset)	0:55	59.78%
Benin	Porto-Novo	14:29:18	16:07:13	17:27:36	2:58	80.91%
Niger	Niamey	14:29:27	16:07:38	17:28:23	2:59	87.94%
Nigeria	Lagos	14:31:32	16:08:22	17:27:58	2:56	79.60%
Chad	N'Djamena	15:00:18	16:23:00	17:32:49	2:33	79.16%

== Eclipse details ==
Shown below are two tables displaying details about this particular solar eclipse. The first table outlines times at which the Moon's penumbra or umbra attains the specific parameter, and the second table describes various other parameters pertaining to this eclipse.

January 5, 2038 Solar Eclipse Times
Event	Time (UTC)
First Penumbral External Contact	2038 January 5 at 11:00:02.2 UTC
First Umbral External Contact	2038 January 5 at 12:04:34.3 UTC
First Central Line	2038 January 5 at 12:06:00.3 UTC
First Umbral Internal Contact	2038 January 5 at 12:07:26.6 UTC
First Penumbral Internal Contact	2038 January 5 at 13:31:44.8 UTC
Ecliptic Conjunction	2038 January 5 at 13:42:33.7 UTC
Greatest Eclipse	2038 January 5 at 13:47:10.9 UTC
Equatorial Conjunction	2038 January 5 at 13:47:52.0 UTC
Greatest Duration	2038 January 5 at 13:53:53.7 UTC
Last Penumbral Internal Contact	2038 January 5 at 14:02:34.7 UTC
Last Umbral Internal Contact	2038 January 5 at 15:26:52.5 UTC
Last Central Line	2038 January 5 at 15:28:21.8 UTC
Last Umbral External Contact	2038 January 5 at 15:29:50.8 UTC
Last Penumbral External Contact	2038 January 5 at 16:34:26.0 UTC

January 5, 2038 Solar Eclipse Parameters
Parameter	Value
Eclipse Magnitude	0.97279
Eclipse Obscuration	0.94632
Gamma	0.41689
Sun Right Ascension	19h06m27.4s
Sun Declination	-22°33'17.3"
Sun Semi-Diameter	16'15.9"
Sun Equatorial Horizontal Parallax	08.9"
Moon Right Ascension	19h06m25.9s
Moon Declination	-22°09'29.7"
Moon Semi-Diameter	15'35.7"
Moon Equatorial Horizontal Parallax	0°57'13.9"
ΔT	77.6 s

== Eclipse season ==
This eclipse is part of an eclipse season, a period, roughly every six months, when eclipses occur. Only two (or occasionally three) eclipse seasons occur each year, and each season lasts about 35 days and repeats just short of six months (173 days) later; thus two full eclipse seasons always occur each year. Either two or three eclipses happen each eclipse season. In the sequence below, each eclipse is separated by a fortnight.

Eclipse season of January 2038
January 5 Descending node (new moon)	January 21 Ascending node (full moon)
Annular solar eclipse Solar Saros 132	Penumbral lunar eclipse Lunar Saros 144

== Related eclipses ==
=== Eclipses in 2038 ===
- An annular solar eclipse on January 5.
- A penumbral lunar eclipse on January 21.
- A penumbral lunar eclipse on June 17.
- An annular solar eclipse on July 2.
- A penumbral lunar eclipse on July 16.
- A penumbral lunar eclipse on December 11.
- A total solar eclipse on December 26.

=== Metonic ===
- Preceded by: Solar eclipse of March 20, 2034
- Followed by: Solar eclipse of October 25, 2041

=== Tzolkinex ===
- Preceded by: Solar eclipse of November 25, 2030
- Followed by: Solar eclipse of February 16, 2045

=== Half-Saros ===
- Preceded by: Lunar eclipse of December 31, 2028
- Followed by: Lunar eclipse of January 12, 2047

=== Tritos ===
- Preceded by: Solar eclipse of February 6, 2027
- Followed by: Solar eclipse of December 5, 2048

=== Solar Saros 132 ===
- Preceded by: Solar eclipse of December 26, 2019
- Followed by: Solar eclipse of January 16, 2056

=== Inex ===
- Preceded by: Solar eclipse of January 26, 2009
- Followed by: Solar eclipse of December 17, 2066

=== Triad ===
- Preceded by: Solar eclipse of March 7, 1951
- Followed by: Solar eclipse of November 6, 2124

=== Solar eclipses of 2036–2039 ===
This eclipse is a member of a semester series. An eclipse in a semester series of solar eclipses repeats approximately every 177 days and 4 hours (a semester) at alternating nodes of the Moon's orbit.

The partial solar eclipses on February 27, 2036 and August 21, 2036 occur in the previous lunar year eclipse set.

Solar eclipse series sets from 2036 to 2039
Ascending node			Descending node		
Saros	Map	Gamma	Saros	Map	Gamma
117	July 23, 2036 Partial	−1.425	122	January 16, 2037 Partial	1.1477
127	July 13, 2037 Total	−0.7246	132	January 5, 2038 Annular	0.4169
137	July 2, 2038 Annular	0.0398	142	December 26, 2038 Total	−0.2881
147	June 21, 2039 Annular	0.8312	152	December 15, 2039 Total	−0.9458

=== Saros 132 ===
This eclipse is a part of Saros series 132, repeating every 18 years, 11 days, and containing 71 events. The series started with a partial solar eclipse on August 13, 1208. It contains annular eclipses from March 17, 1569 through March 12, 2146; hybrid eclipses on March 23, 2164 and April 3, 2182; and total eclipses from April 14, 2200 through June 19, 2308. The series ends at member 71 as a partial eclipse on September 25, 2470. Its eclipses are tabulated in three columns; every third eclipse in the same column is one exeligmos apart, so they all cast shadows over approximately the same parts of the Earth.

The longest duration of annularity was produced by member 25 at 6 minutes, 56 seconds on May 9, 1641, and the longest duration of totality will be produced by member 61 at 2 minutes, 14 seconds on June 8, 2290. All eclipses in this series occur at the Moon’s descending node of orbit.

Series members 34–56 occur between 1801 and 2200:
34	35	36
August 17, 1803	August 27, 1821	September 7, 1839
37	38	39
September 18, 1857	September 29, 1875	October 9, 1893
40	41	42
October 22, 1911	November 1, 1929	November 12, 1947
43	44	45
November 23, 1965	December 4, 1983	December 14, 2001
46	47	48
December 26, 2019	January 5, 2038	January 16, 2056
49	50	51
January 27, 2074	February 7, 2092	February 18, 2110
52	53	54
March 1, 2128	March 12, 2146	March 23, 2164
55	56	
April 3, 2182	April 14, 2200	

=== Metonic series ===
The metonic series repeats eclipses every 19 years (6939.69 days), lasting about 5 cycles. Eclipses occur in nearly the same calendar date. In addition, the octon subseries repeats 1/5 of that or every 3.8 years (1387.94 days). All eclipses in this table occur at the Moon's descending node.

22 eclipse events between June 1, 2011 and October 24, 2098
May 31–June 1	March 19–20	January 5–6	October 24–25	August 12–13
118	120	122	124	126
June 1, 2011	March 20, 2015	January 6, 2019	October 25, 2022	August 12, 2026
128	130	132	134	136
June 1, 2030	March 20, 2034	January 5, 2038	October 25, 2041	August 12, 2045
138	140	142	144	146
May 31, 2049	March 20, 2053	January 5, 2057	October 24, 2060	August 12, 2064
148	150	152	154	156
May 31, 2068	March 19, 2072	January 6, 2076	October 24, 2079	August 13, 2083
158	160	162	164	
June 1, 2087			October 24, 2098	

=== Tritos series ===
This eclipse is a part of a tritos cycle, repeating at alternating nodes every 135 synodic months (≈ 3986.63 days, or 11 years minus 1 month). Their appearance and longitude are irregular due to a lack of synchronization with the anomalistic month (period of perigee), but groupings of 3 tritos cycles (≈ 33 years minus 3 months) come close (≈ 434.044 anomalistic months), so eclipses are similar in these groupings.

Series members between 1801 and 2200
October 19, 1808 (Saros 111)	September 19, 1819 (Saros 112)	August 18, 1830 (Saros 113)	July 18, 1841 (Saros 114)	June 17, 1852 (Saros 115)
May 17, 1863 (Saros 116)	April 16, 1874 (Saros 117)	March 16, 1885 (Saros 118)	February 13, 1896 (Saros 119)	January 14, 1907 (Saros 120)
December 14, 1917 (Saros 121)	November 12, 1928 (Saros 122)	October 12, 1939 (Saros 123)	September 12, 1950 (Saros 124)	August 11, 1961 (Saros 125)
July 10, 1972 (Saros 126)	June 11, 1983 (Saros 127)	May 10, 1994 (Saros 128)	April 8, 2005 (Saros 129)	March 9, 2016 (Saros 130)
February 6, 2027 (Saros 131)	January 5, 2038 (Saros 132)	December 5, 2048 (Saros 133)	November 5, 2059 (Saros 134)	October 4, 2070 (Saros 135)
September 3, 2081 (Saros 136)	August 3, 2092 (Saros 137)	July 4, 2103 (Saros 138)	June 3, 2114 (Saros 139)	May 3, 2125 (Saros 140)
April 1, 2136 (Saros 141)	March 2, 2147 (Saros 142)	January 30, 2158 (Saros 143)	December 29, 2168 (Saros 144)	November 28, 2179 (Saros 145)
October 29, 2190 (Saros 146)

=== Inex series ===
This eclipse is a part of the long period inex cycle, repeating at alternating nodes, every 358 synodic months (≈ 10,571.95 days, or 29 years minus 20 days). Their appearance and longitude are irregular due to a lack of synchronization with the anomalistic month (period of perigee). However, groupings of 3 inex cycles (≈ 87 years minus 2 months) comes close (≈ 1,151.02 anomalistic months), so eclipses are similar in these groupings.

Series members between 1801 and 2200
June 16, 1806 (Saros 124)	May 27, 1835 (Saros 125)	May 6, 1864 (Saros 126)
April 16, 1893 (Saros 127)	March 28, 1922 (Saros 128)	March 7, 1951 (Saros 129)
February 16, 1980 (Saros 130)	January 26, 2009 (Saros 131)	January 5, 2038 (Saros 132)
December 17, 2066 (Saros 133)	November 27, 2095 (Saros 134)	November 6, 2124 (Saros 135)
October 17, 2153 (Saros 136)	September 27, 2182 (Saros 137)	
