= Solar eclipse of December 26, 2019 =

21st-century annular solar eclipse

- Annular eclipse
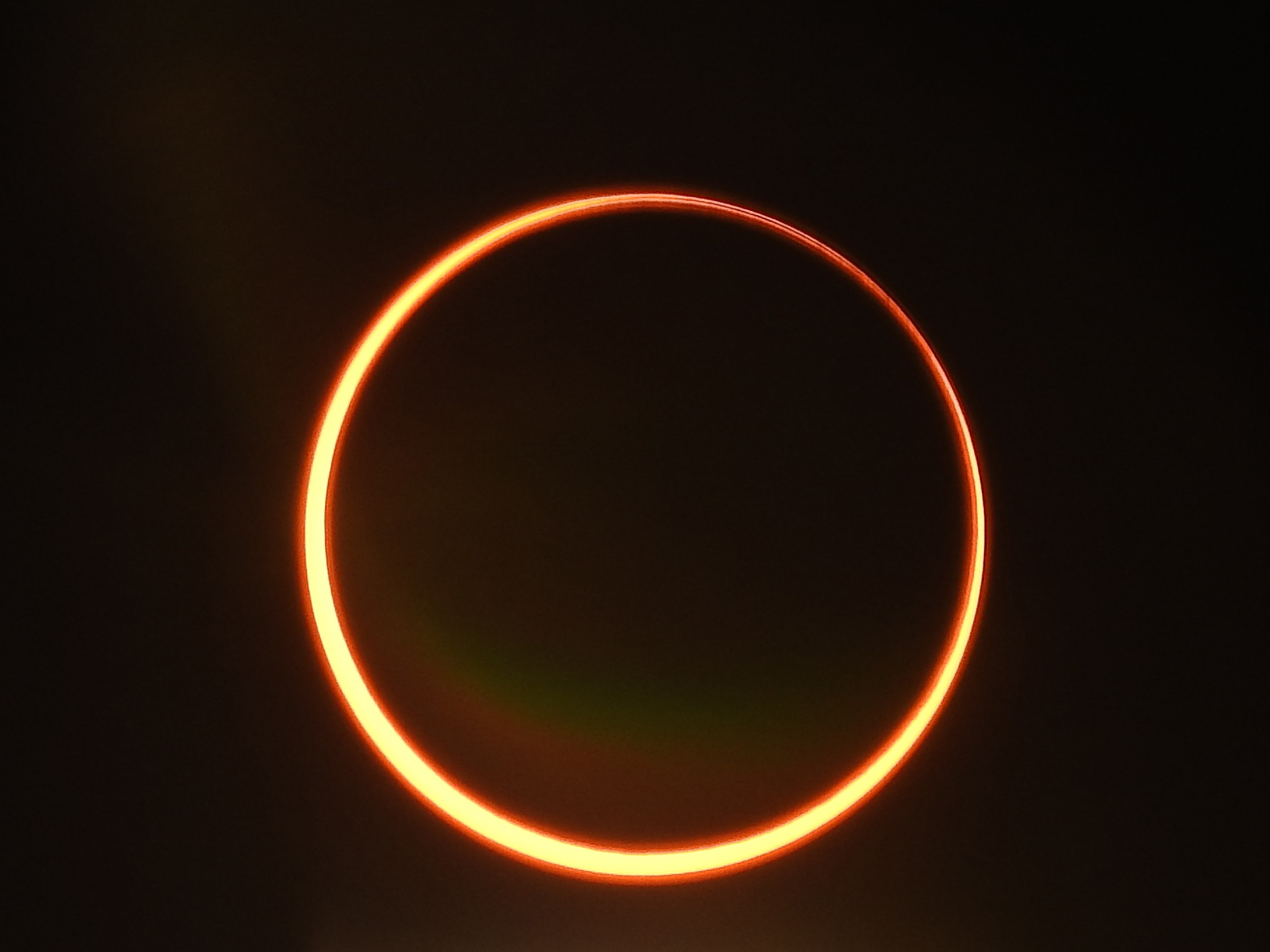
- Annularity as seen from Jaffna, Sri Lanka

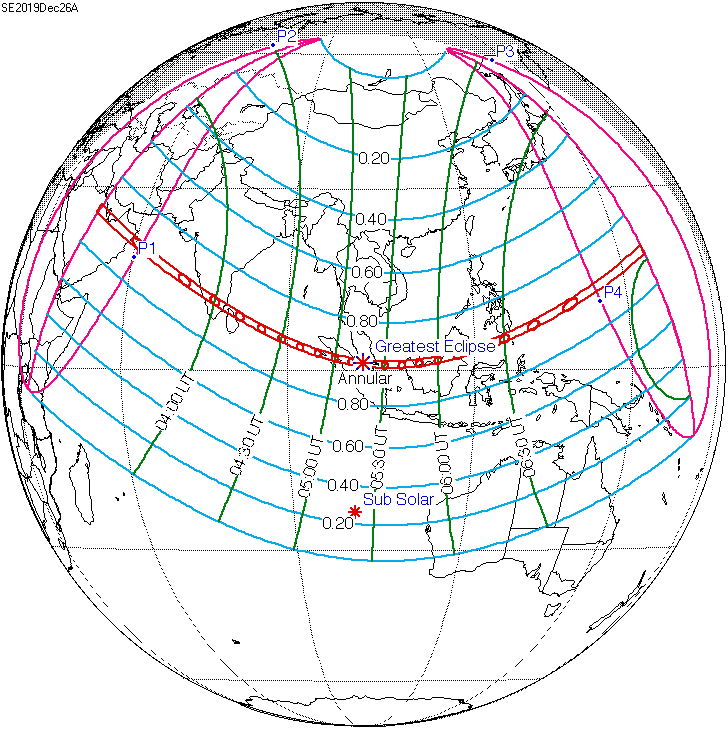
- Map
- Gamma: 0.4135
- Magnitude: 0.9701

Maximum eclipse
- Duration: 220 s (3 min 40 s)
- Coordinates: 1°N 102.3°E
- Max. width of band: 118 km (73 mi)

Times (UTC)
- Greatest eclipse: 5:18:53

References
- Saros: 132 (46 of 71)
- Catalog # (SE5000): 9552

An annular solar eclipse occurred at the Moon’s descending node of orbit on Thursday, December 26, 2019, with a magnitude of 0.9701. A solar eclipse occurs when the Moon passes between Earth and the Sun, thereby totally or partly obscuring the Sun for a viewer on Earth. An annular solar eclipse occurs when the Moon's apparent diameter is smaller than the Sun's, blocking most of the Sun's light and causing the Sun to look like an annulus (ring). An annular eclipse appears as a partial eclipse over a region of the Earth thousands of kilometres wide. The Moon's apparent diameter was near the average diameter because it occurred 7.3 days after perigee (on December 18, 2019, at 20:25 UTC) and 6.2 days before apogee (on January 2, 2020, at 1:30 UTC).

Annularity was visible in Saudi Arabia, Qatar, United Arab Emirates, Oman, southern India, Sri Lanka, Malaysia, Indonesia, Singapore, the Northern Mariana Islands, and Guam. A partial eclipse was visible for parts of East Africa, Asia, and northern Australia.

== Visibility and viewing ==
Animated path

It was the last solar eclipse of 2019. The central path of the 2019 annular eclipse passed through the Saudi Arabian peninsula, southern India, Sumatra, Borneo, Philippines and Guam. A partial eclipse was visible thousands of kilometers wide from the central path. It covered small parts of Eastern Europe, much of Asia, North and West Australia, Eastern Africa, the Pacific Ocean and the Indian Ocean. The eclipse started with an antumbra having a magnitude of 0.96; it stretched 164 kilometers wide, and traveled eastwards at an average rate of 1.1 kilometers per second. The longest duration of annularity was 3 minutes and 40 seconds, at 5.30 UT1 occurring in the South China Sea (0°45'54.0"N 105°29'06.0"E).

The eclipse began in Saudi Arabia about 220 kilometers northeast of Riyadh at 03:43 UT1 and ended in Guam at 06:59.4 UT1. It reached India near Kannur, Kerala, at 03:56 UT1. The shadow reached the southeast coast of India at 04:04 UT1. Traveling through northern Sri Lanka, it headed into the Bay of Bengal. The next main visible places were Palau (Malaysia), Sumatra and Singapore. It then passed through the South China Sea, crossed Borneo and the Celebes Sea, the Philippines archipelago and then headed towards the western Pacific. The antumbral shadow encountered Guam at 6:56 UT1 and rose back into space.

== Eclipse timing ==
=== Places experiencing annular eclipse ===
Solar Eclipse of December 26, 2019 (Local Times)
Country or territory	City or place	Start of partial eclipse	Start of annular eclipse	Maximum eclipse	End of annular eclipse	End of partial eclipse	Duration of annularity (min:s)	Duration of eclipse (hr:min)	Maximum coverage
Saudi Arabia	Hofuf	06:25:08 (sunrise)	06:34:37	06:36:07	06:37:36	07:48:36	2:59	1:23	91.67%
Qatar	Doha	06:17:06 (sunrise)	06:36:30	06:36:36	06:36:42	07:50:24	0:12	1:33	91.76%
India	Mangaluru	08:04:22	09:24:04	09:25:13	09:26:21	11:03:36	2:17	2:59	93.19%
India	Kasaragod	08:04:31	09:24:03	09:25:34	09:27:05	11:04:14	3:02	3:00	93.21%
India	Padne	08:04:39	09:24:19	09:25:54	09:27:29	11:04:50	3:10	3:00	93.22%
India	Kannur	08:04:51	09:24:50	09:26:20	09:27:50	11:05:38	3:00	3:01	93.24%
India	Thalassery	08:04:57	09:25:07	09:26:35	09:28:02	11:06:03	2:55	3:01	93.25%
India	Madikeri	08:05:01	09:25:48	09:26:47	09:27:45	11:06:24	1:57	3:01	93.24%
India	Kozhikode	08:05:15	09:26:33	09:27:12	09:27:51	11:07:09	1:18	3:02	93.28%
India	Koduvally	08:05:19	09:26:10	09:27:23	09:28:36	11:07:29	2:26	3:02	93.28%
India	Kalpetta	08:05:23	09:26:00	09:27:35	09:29:10	11:07:51	3:10	3:02	93.28%
India	Malappuram	08:05:31	09:27:31	09:27:47	09:28:02	11:08:08	0:31	3:03	93.30%
India	Palakkad	08:05:58	09:28:12	09:28:50	09:29:28	11:10:00	1:16	3:04	93.33%
India	Coimbatore	08:06:08	09:27:46	09:29:18	09:30:50	11:10:51	3:04	3:05	93.34%
India	Tiruppur	08:06:24	09:28:20	09:29:55	09:31:30	11:11:55	3:10	3:06	93.36%
India	Dharapuram	08:06:37	09:28:49	09:30:22	09:31:56	11:12:42	3:07	3:06	93.38%
India	Erode	08:06:39	09:29:33	09:30:31	09:31:29	11:12:57	1:56	3:06	93.37%
India	Karur	08:07:00	09:29:56	09:31:18	09:32:38	11:14:17	2:42	3:07	93.39%
India	Madurai	08:07:18	09:31:37	09:31:46	09:31:53	11:15:00	0:16	3:08	93.42%
India	Tiruchirappalli	08:07:32	09:31:33	09:32:29	09:33:24	11:16:17	1:51	3:09	93.42%
India	Sivaganga	08:07:38	09:31:31	09:32:29	09:33:26	11:16:14	1:55	3:09	93.45%
India	Pudukkottai	08:07:45	09:31:20	09:32:53	09:34:26	11:16:58	3:06	3:09	93.44%
India	Karaikudi	08:07:48	09:31:21	09:32:55	09:34:30	11:17:01	3:09	3:09	93.45%
India	Devakottai	08:07:52	09:31:34	09:33:05	09:34:34	11:17:15	3:00	3:09	93.46%
Sri Lanka	Jaffna	08:08:59	09:33:54	09:35:30	09:37:06	11:21:18	3:12	3:12	93.52%
Sri Lanka	Trincomalee	08:10:30	09:37:06	09:38:31	09:39:57	11:26:06	2:51	3:16	93.60%
Singapore	Singapore	11:27:05	13:22:41	13:23:44	13:24:47	15:18:32	2:06	3:51	94.24%
Indonesia	Batam	10:27:33	12:22:35	12:24:15	12:25:56	14:18:52	3:21	3:51	94.24%
Indonesia	Tanjungpinang	10:29:02	12:24:19	12:26:06	12:27:52	14:20:11	3:33	3:51	94.24%
Guam	Hagåtña	15:33:51	16:54:33	16:56:08	16:57:42	18:01:17 (sunset)	3:09	2:27	92.04%

=== Places experiencing partial eclipse ===
Solar Eclipse of December 26, 2019 (Local Times)
Country or territory	City or place	Start of partial eclipse	Maximum eclipse	End of partial eclipse	Duration of eclipse (hr:min)	Maximum coverage
Qatar	Al Jemailiya	06:19:37 (sunrise)	06:36:36	07:50:05	1:30	91.57%
Bahrain	Manama	06:22:55 (sunrise)	06:36:44	07:49:48	1:27	90.70%
Qatar	Al Khor	06:18:05 (sunrise)	06:36:46	07:50:30	1:32	91.03%
United Arab Emirates	Abu Dhabi	07:04:03 (sunrise)	07:37:18	08:53:11	1:49	90.80%
Saudi Arabia	Riyadh	06:35:00 (sunrise)	06:37:44	07:45:47	1:11	87.25%
United Arab Emirates	Dubai	07:02:01 (sunrise)	07:38:01	08:54:24	1:52	87.18%
Oman	Muscat	06:45:32 (sunrise)	07:39:04	08:58:12	2:13	87.51%
Kuwait	Kuwait City	06:40:22 (sunrise)	06:43:08	07:48:48	1:08	81.02%
Pakistan	Karachi	07:34:07	08:46:09	10:10:53	2:37	70.32%
Iran	Tehran	07:12:12 (sunrise)	07:16:18	08:23:10	1:11	60.43%
Iraq	Basra	06:43:37 (sunrise)	06:46:25	07:49:06	1:05	75.40%
India	Mumbai	08:03:58	09:21:42	10:55:07	2:51	78.94%
Maldives	Malé	07:38:25	08:56:58	10:32:08	2:54	67.33%
India	Bengaluru	08:06:20	09:29:44	11:11:25	3:05	89.58%
India	New Delhi	08:16:56	09:30:52	10:57:11	2:40	44.72%
Sri Lanka	Sri Jayawardenepura Kotte	08:10:06	09:36:43	11:22:34	3:12	87.69%
Iraq	Baghdad	07:04:01 (sunrise)	07:06:56	07:48:13	0:44	44.50%
Myanmar	Yangon	09:38:46	11:17:54	13:08:12	3:29	51.63%
Thailand	Bangkok	10:18:23	12:05:27	13:57:54	3:40	56.92%
Malaysia	Kuala Lumpur	11:20:02	13:14:46	15:11:49	3:52	89.69%
Cambodia	Phnom Penh	10:30:59	12:24:14	14:14:45	3:44	61.50%
Vietnam	Ho Chi Minh City	10:36:36	12:31:42	14:20:45	3:44	63.72%
Indonesia	Jakarta	10:42:41	12:36:14	14:23:15	3:41	72.37%
Brunei	Bandar Seri Begawan	12:04:52	14:03:02	15:43:23	3:39	85.85%
Philippines	Manila	12:32:15	14:19:07	15:47:33	3:15	60.27%
Philippines	General Santos	12:43:05	14:30:20	15:57:21	3:14	91.96%
Philippines	Davao City	12:44:45	14:31:16	15:57:42	3:13	89.50%
Palau	Ngerulmud	14:12:25	15:46:37	17:03:49	2:51	91.13%
Federated States of Micronesia	Colonia	15:21:03	16:50:48	18:05:01	2:44	92.12%
Northern Mariana Islands	Saipan	15:35:09	16:56:20	17:54:08 (sunset)	2:19	91.03%

== Gallery ==
Map showing the visibility of the eclipse in India

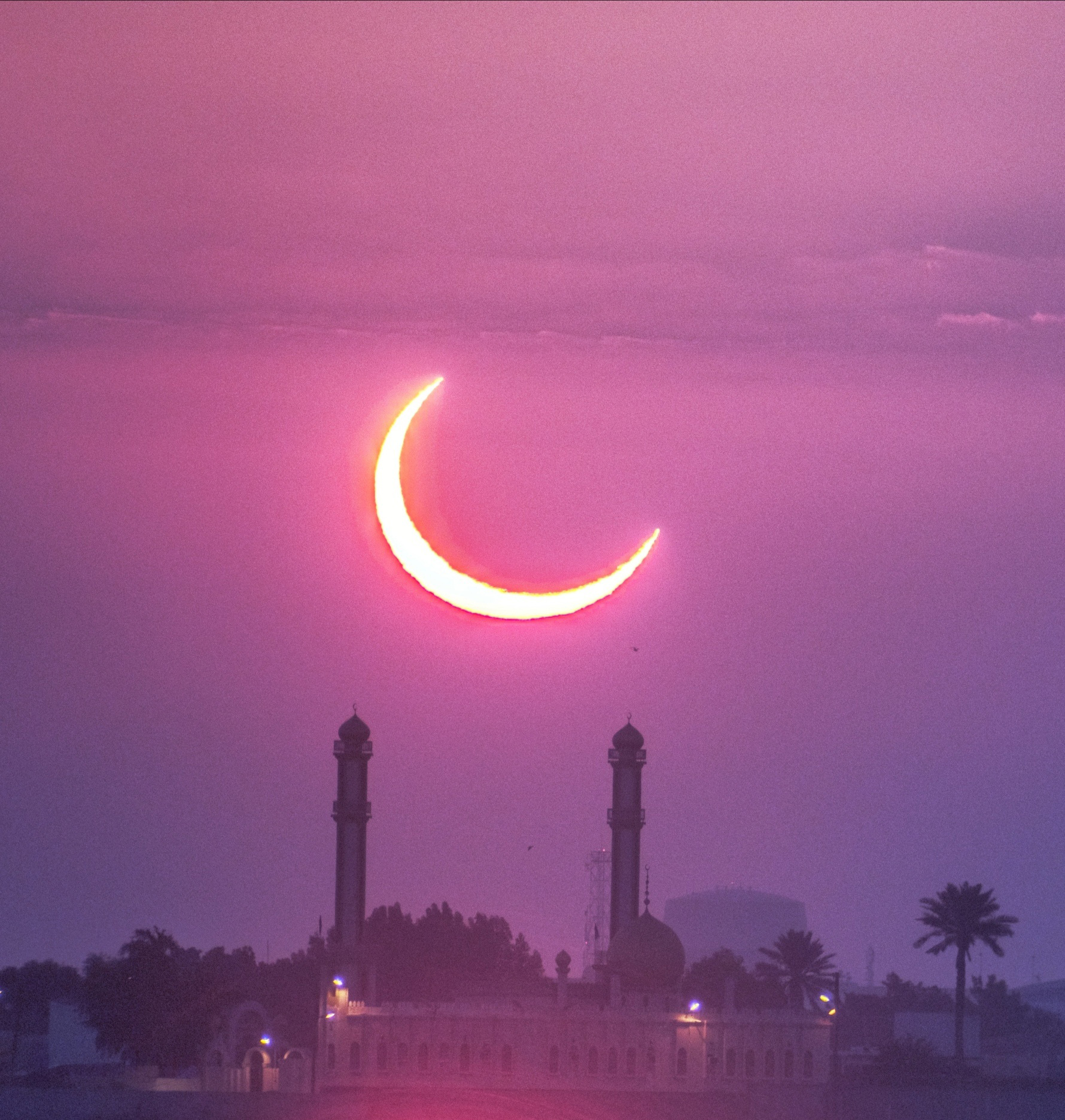
Partial from Nabih Saleh, Bahrain, 3:32 UTC

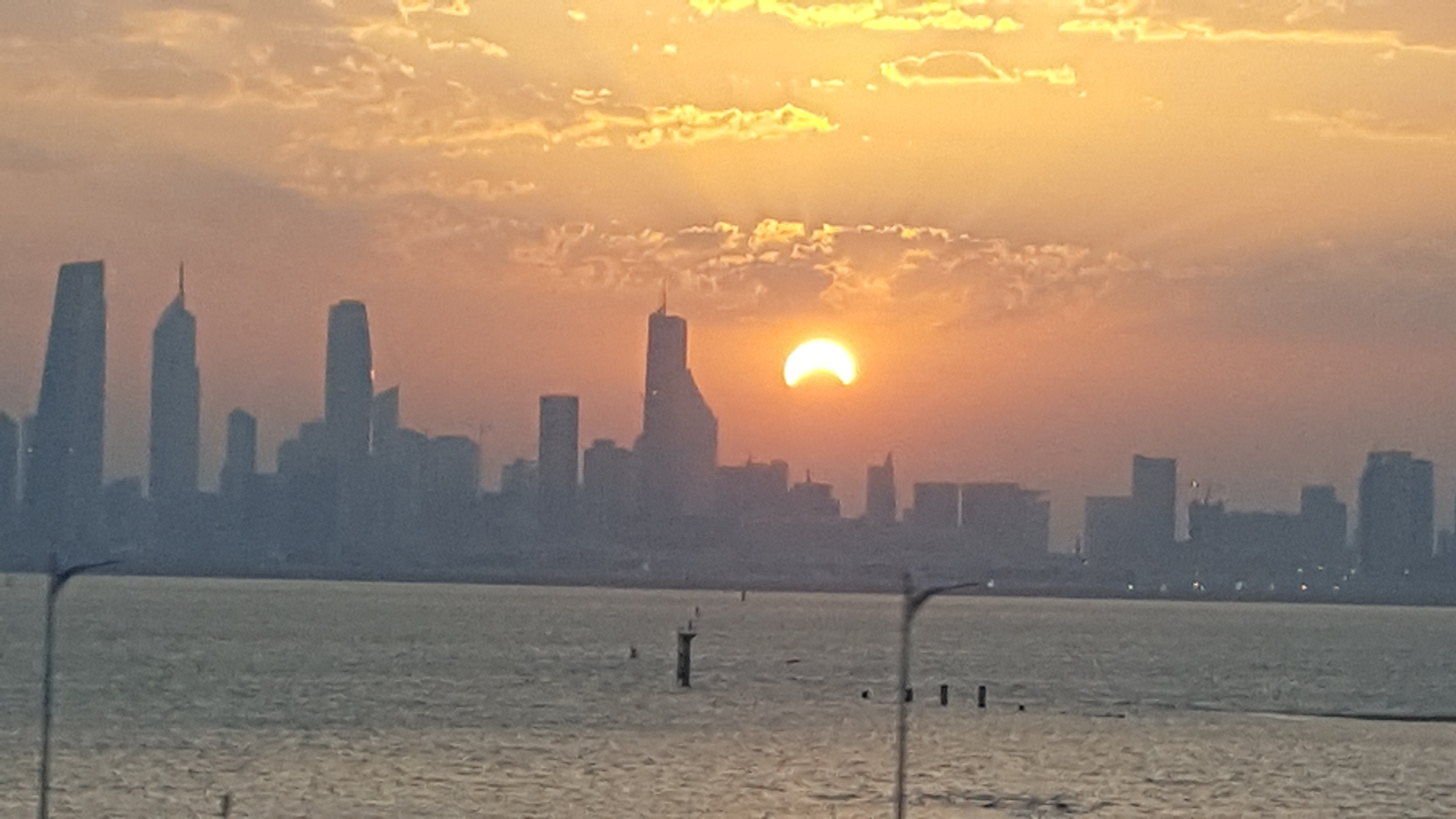
Partial from Kuwait City, 3:52 UTC

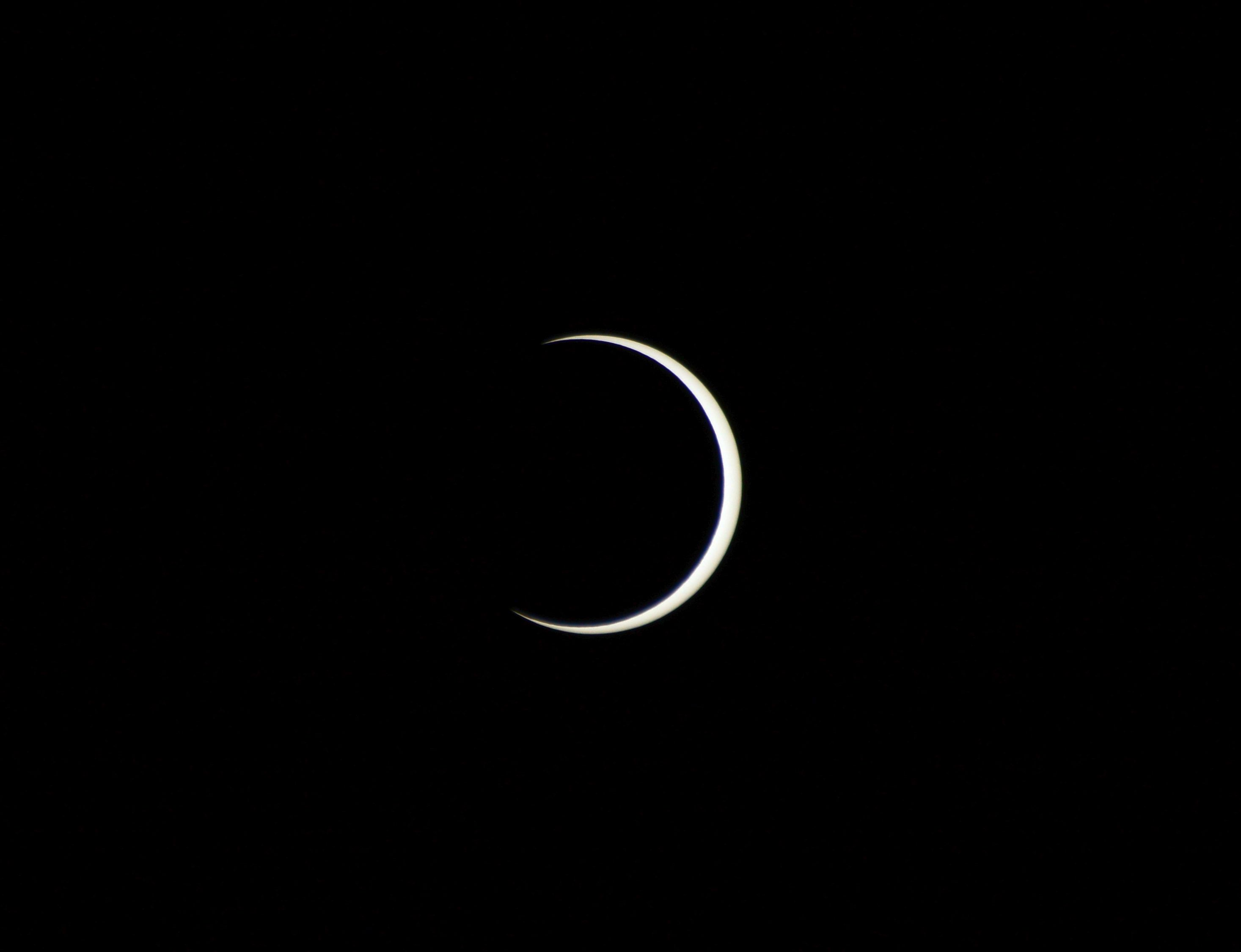
Partial from Kochi, India, 3:59 UTC

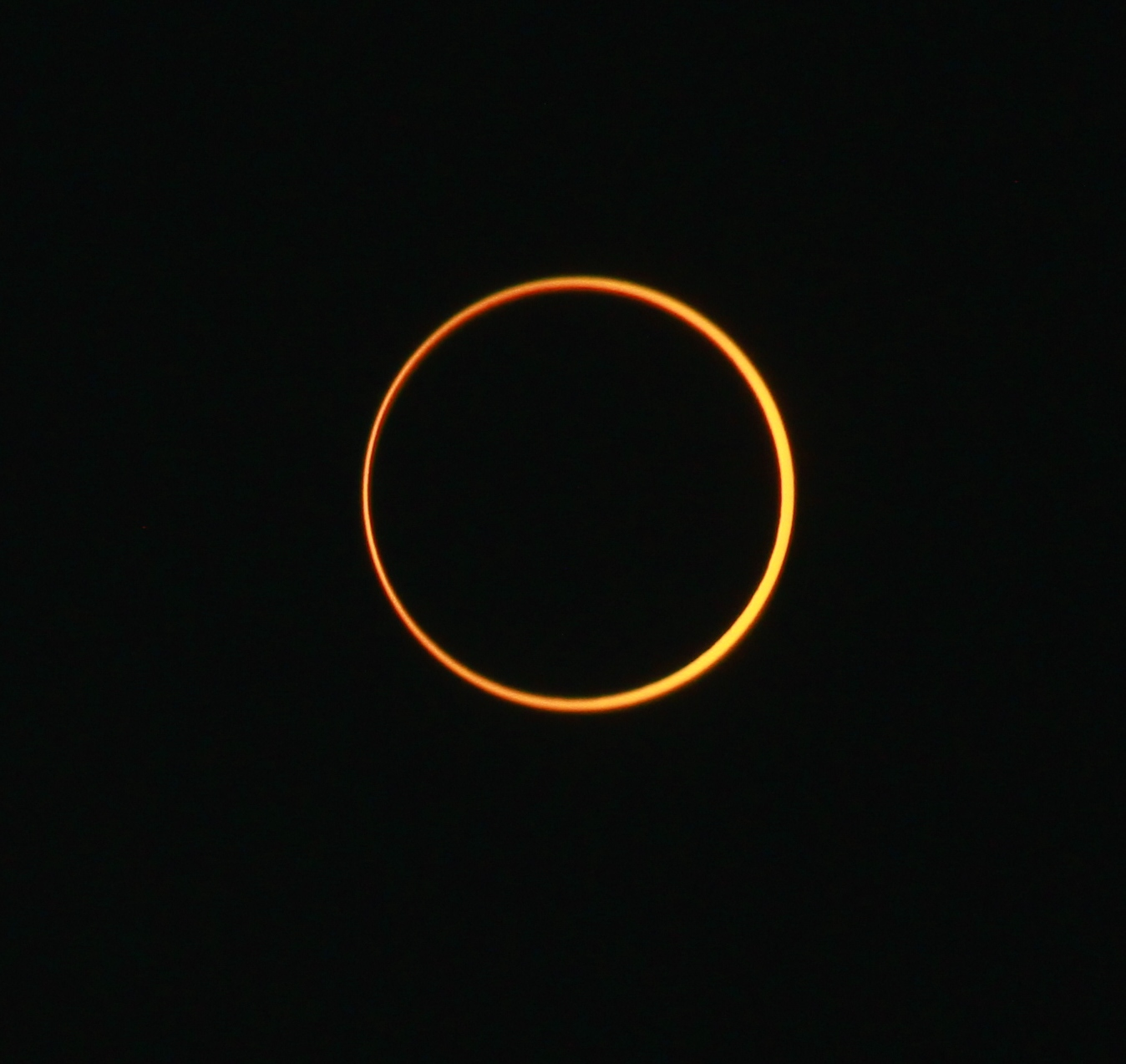
Nilambur, India, 3:59 UTC

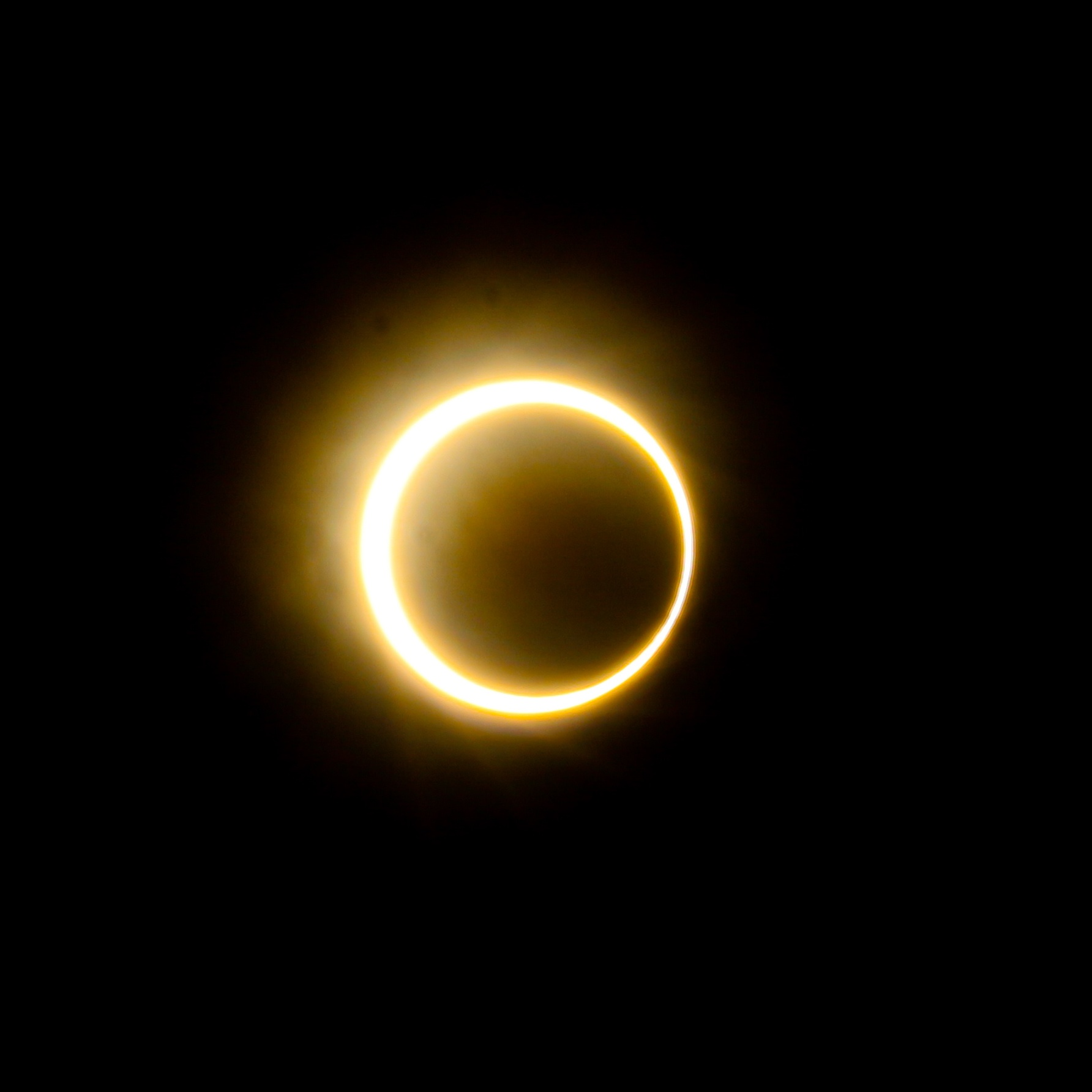
Mangalore, India, 4:16 UTC

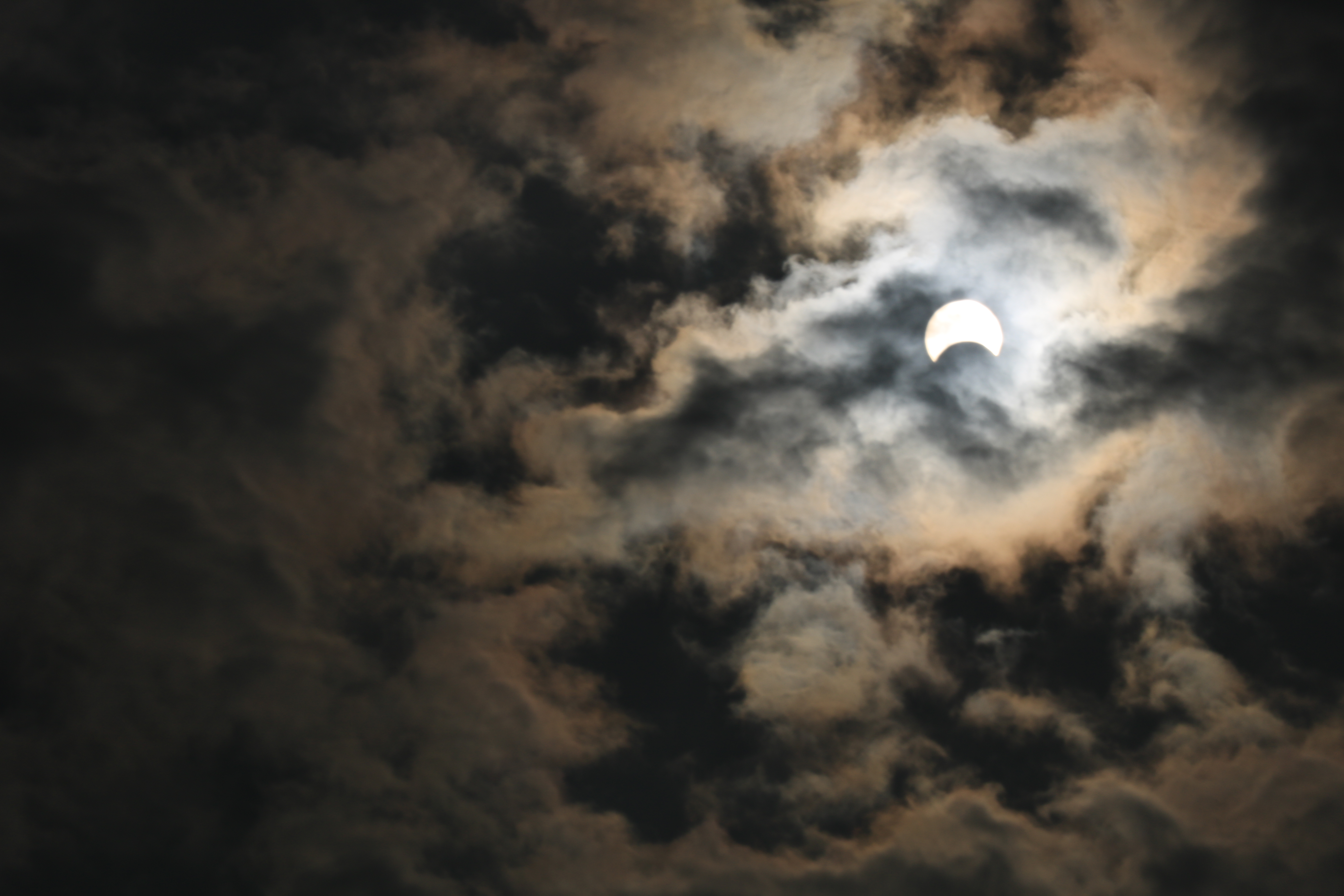
Partial from Dhaka, Bangladesh, 5:13 UTC

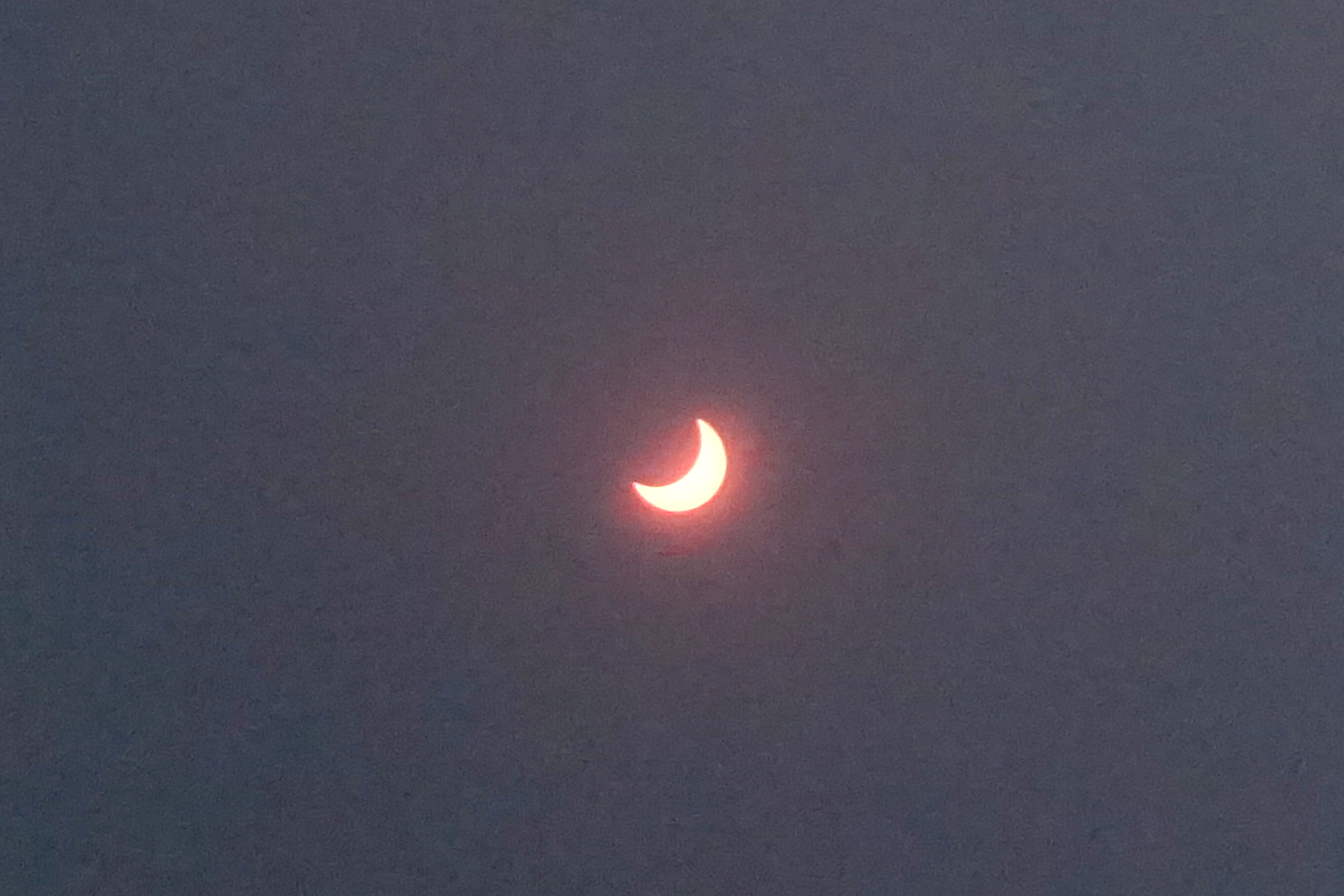
Partial from Jakarta, Indonesia, 5:18 UTC

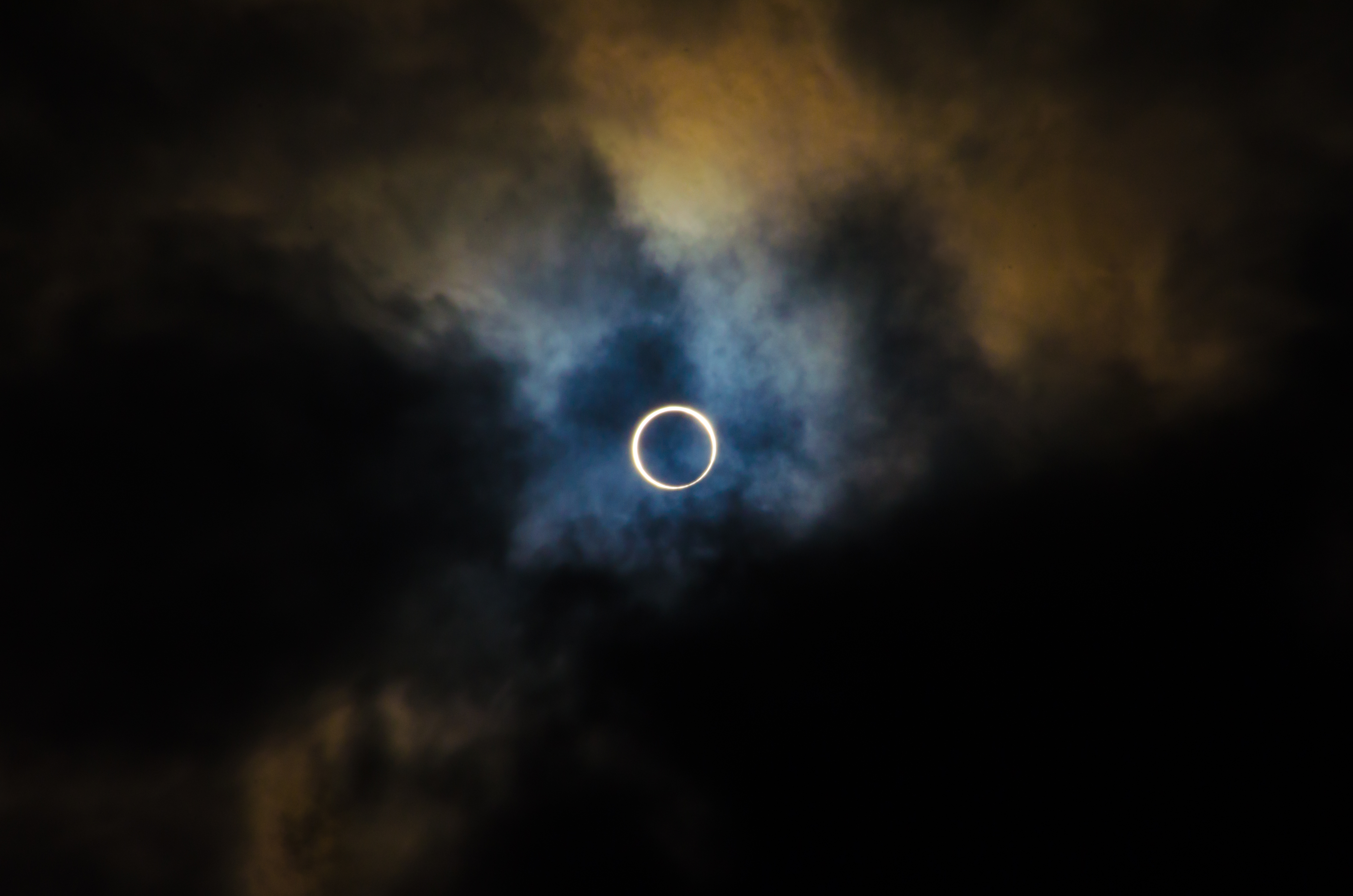
Labrador Nature Reserve, Singapore, 5:23 UTC

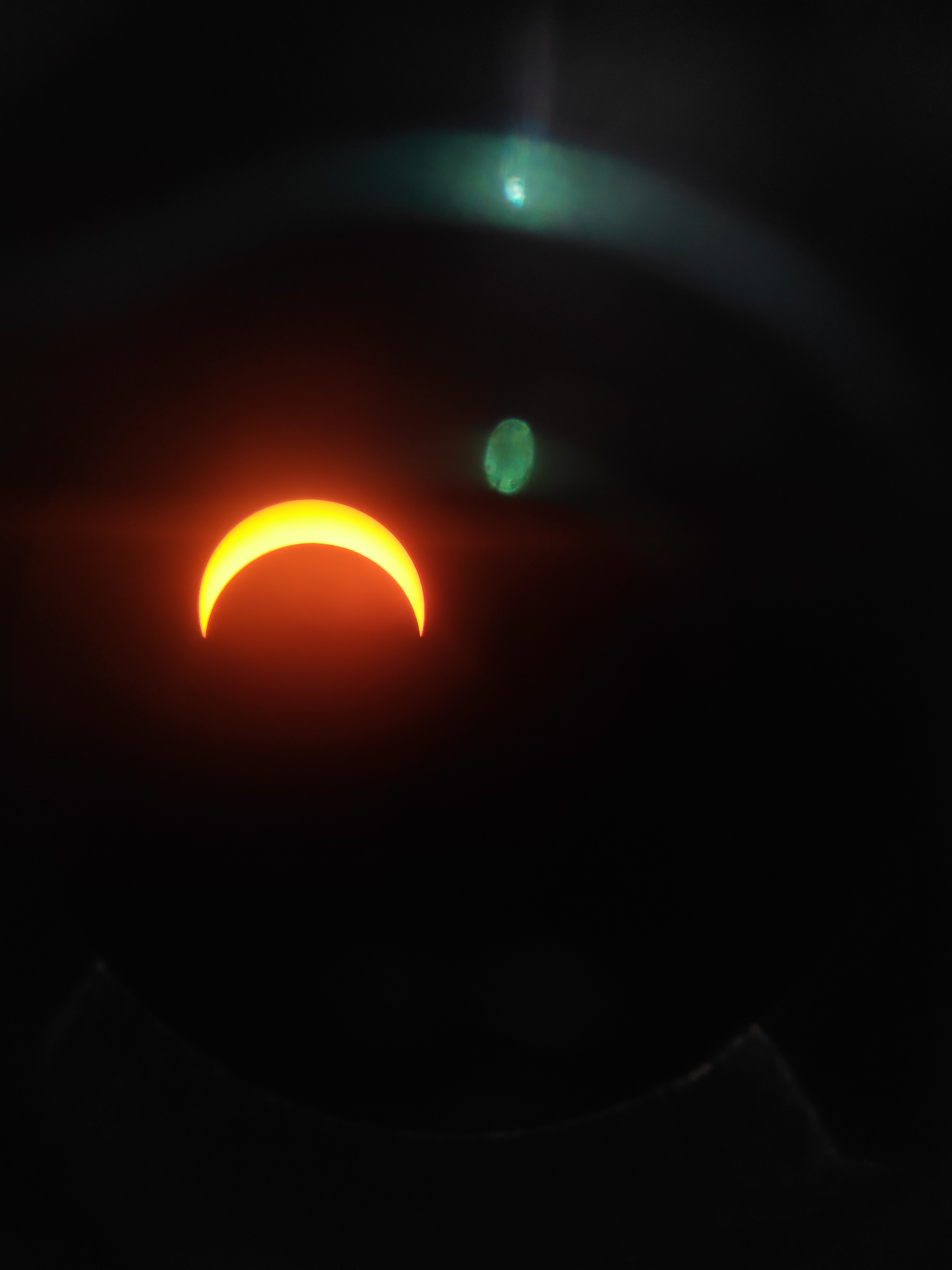
Partial from University of Science, Malaysia, 5:25 UTC

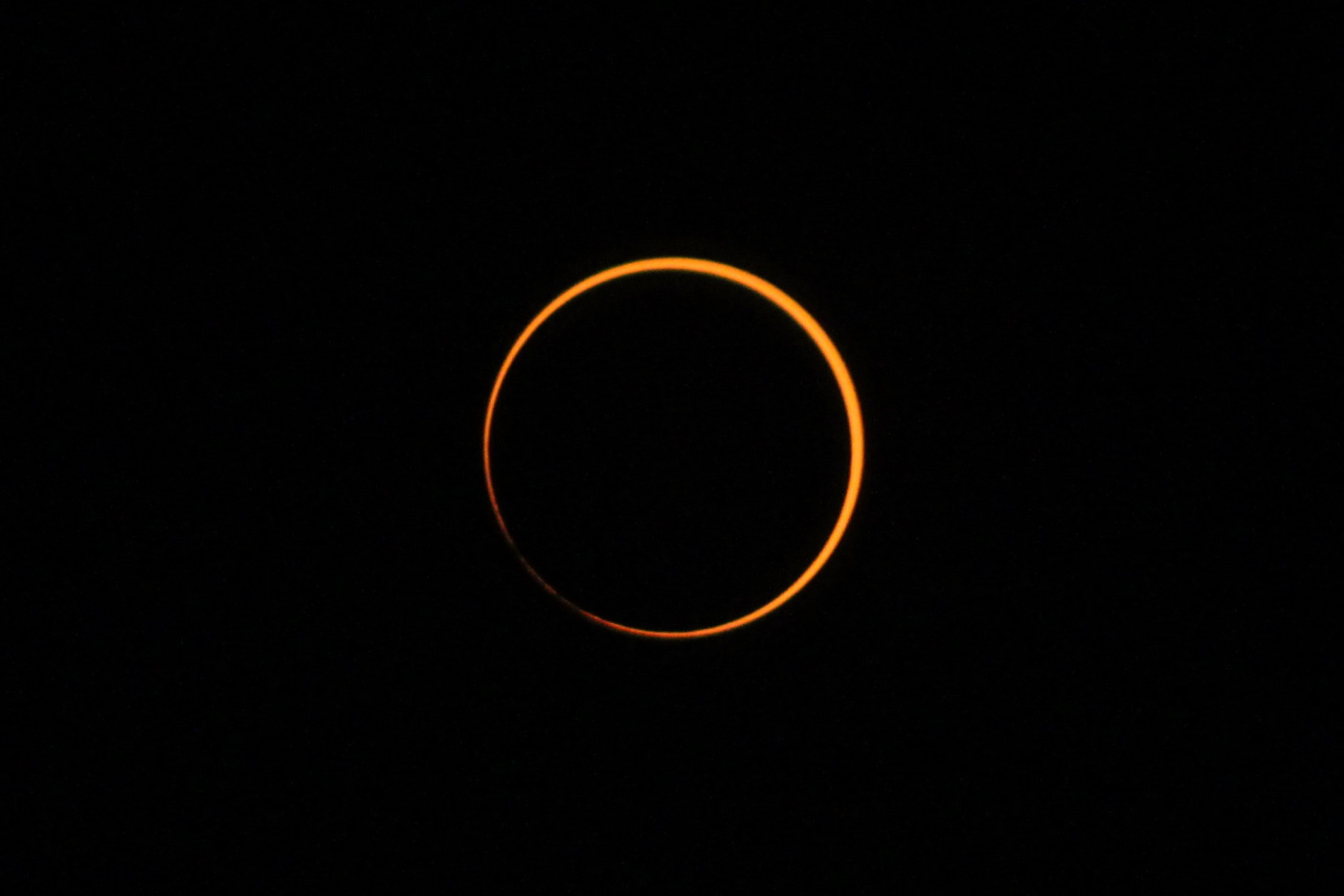
Batam, Indonesia, 5:25 UTC

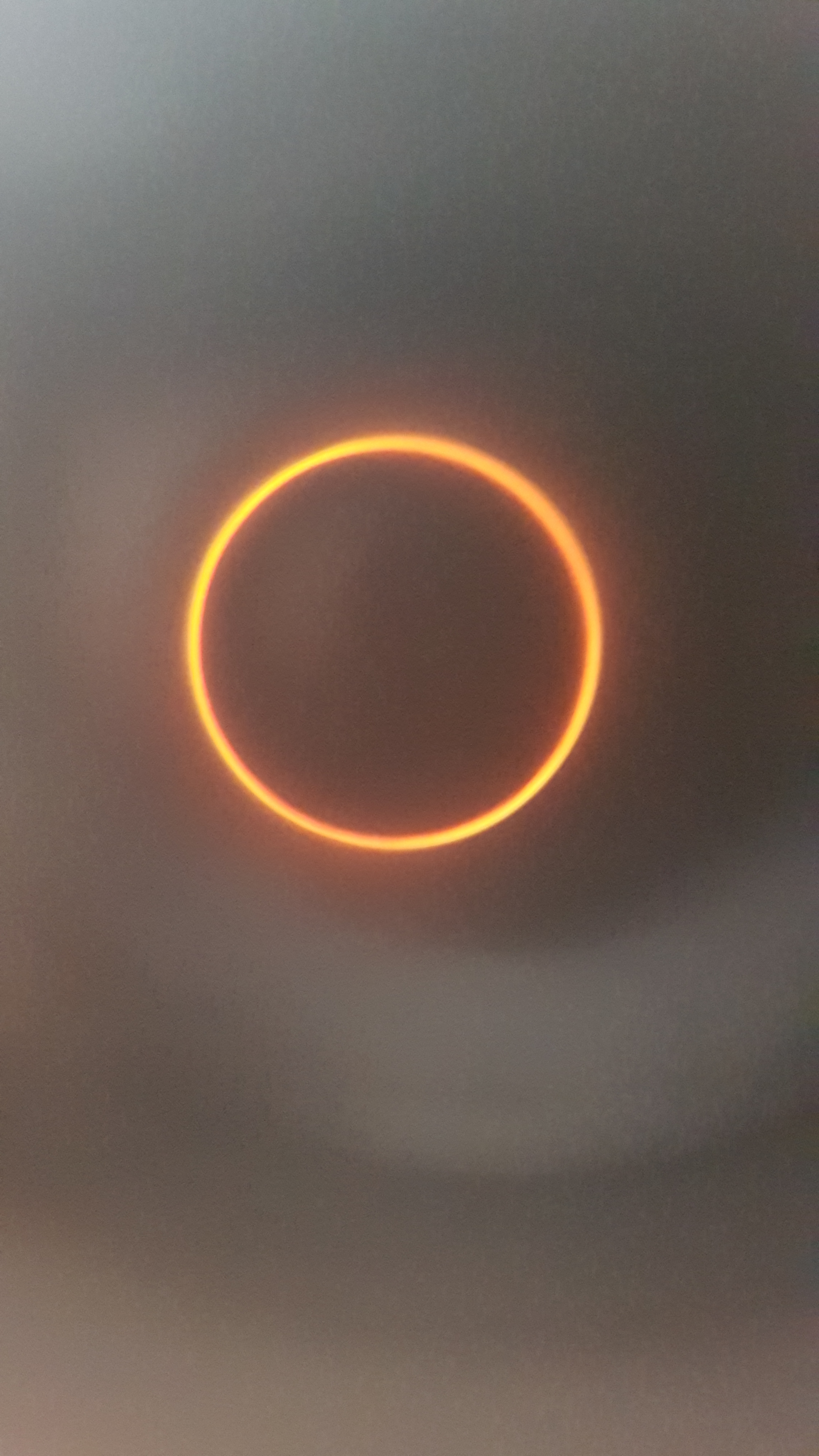
Tanjungpinang, Indonesia, 5:25 UTC

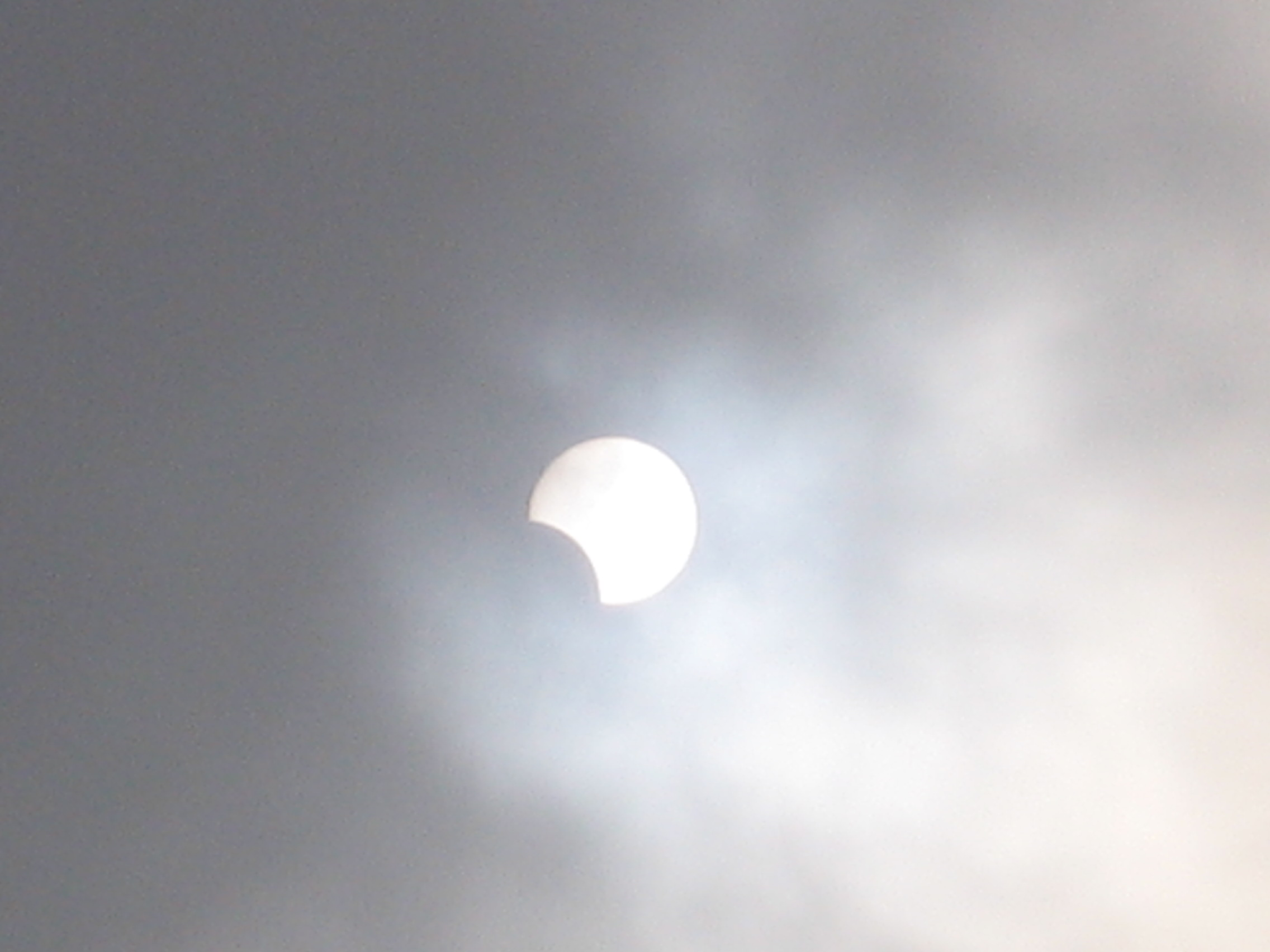
Partial from Hefei, China, 6:18 UTC

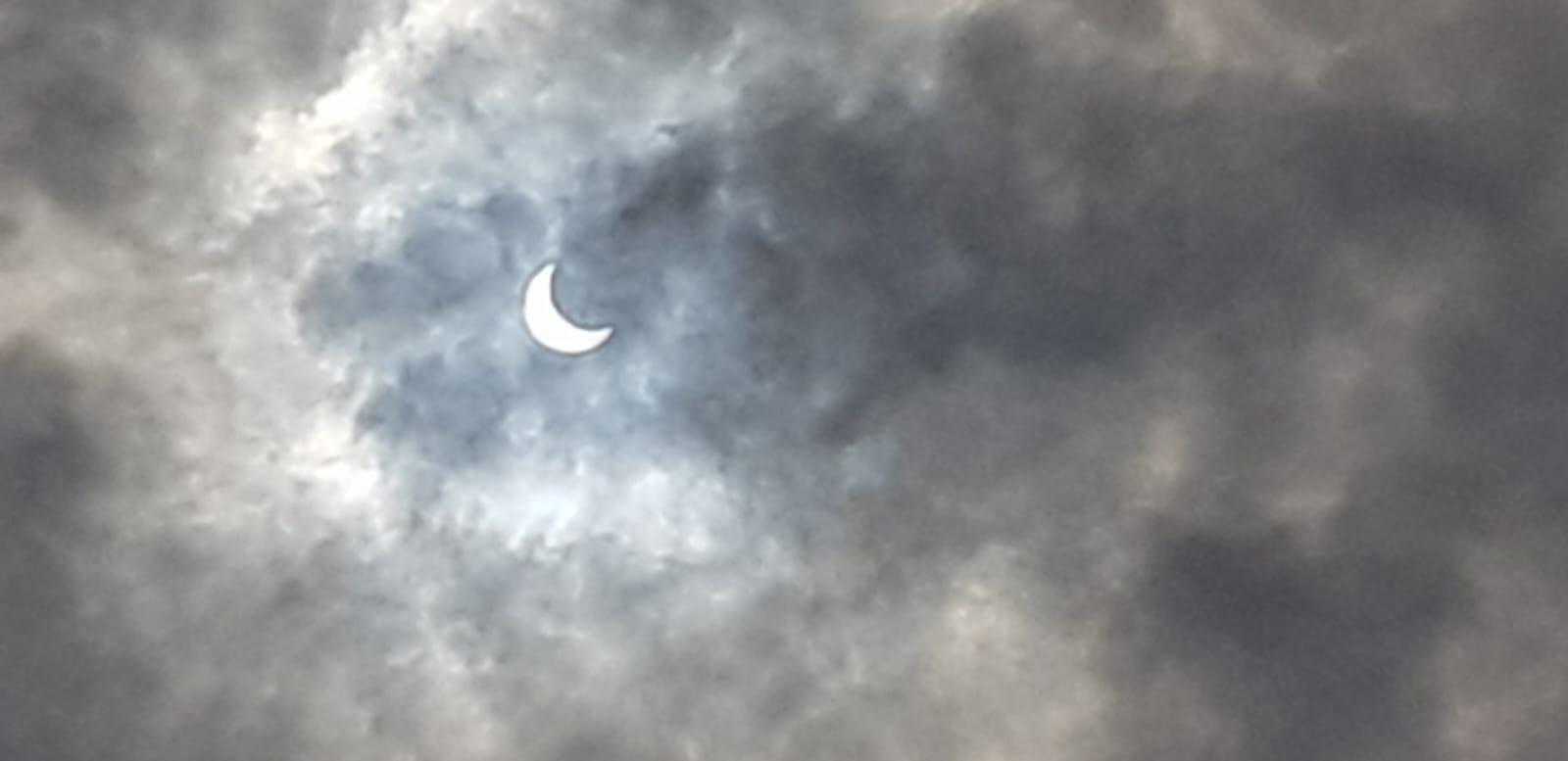
Solar eclipse from Palembang, Indonesia, 5:56 UTC

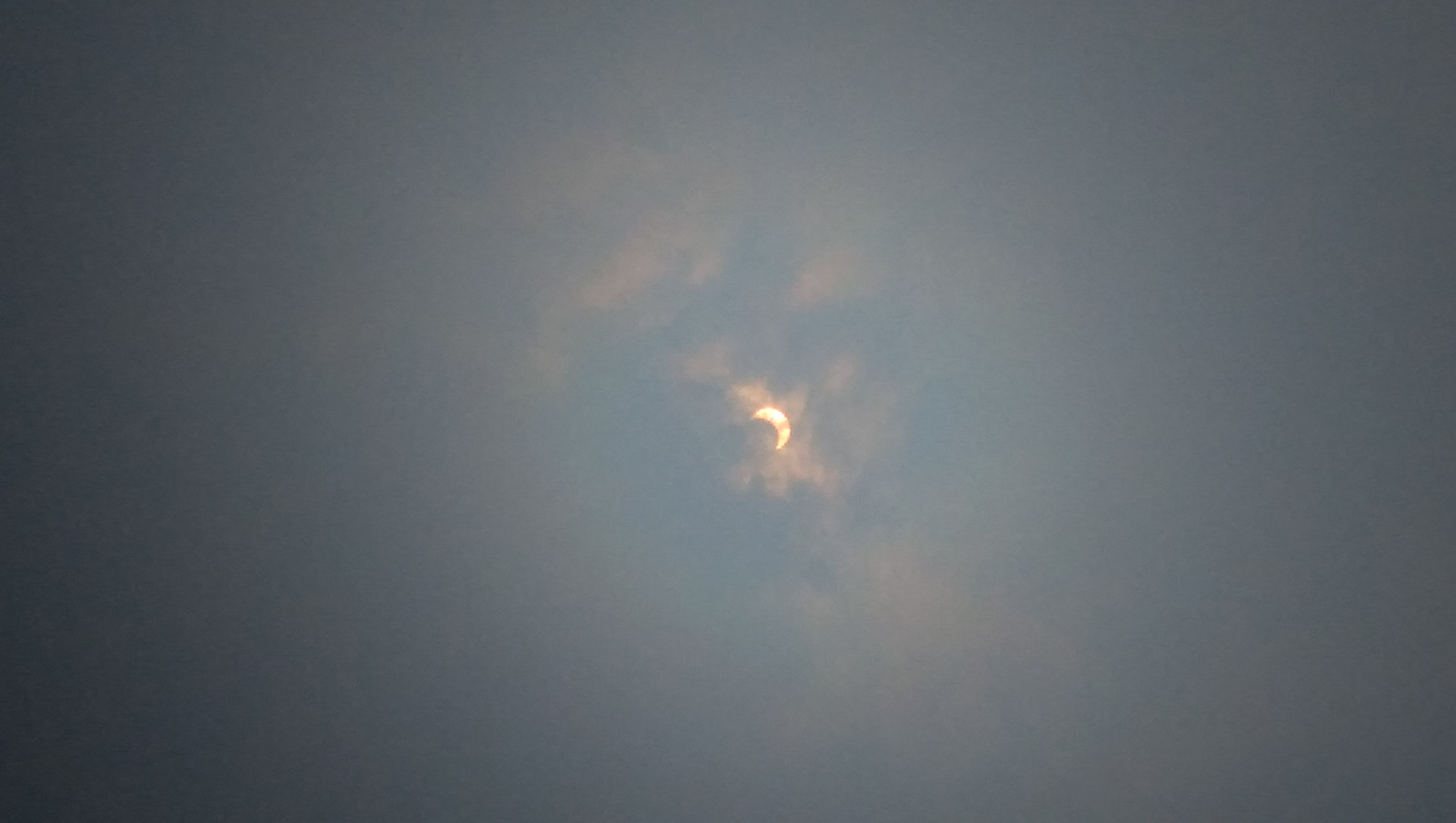
Partial from San Jose del Monte, Philippines, 6:19 UTC

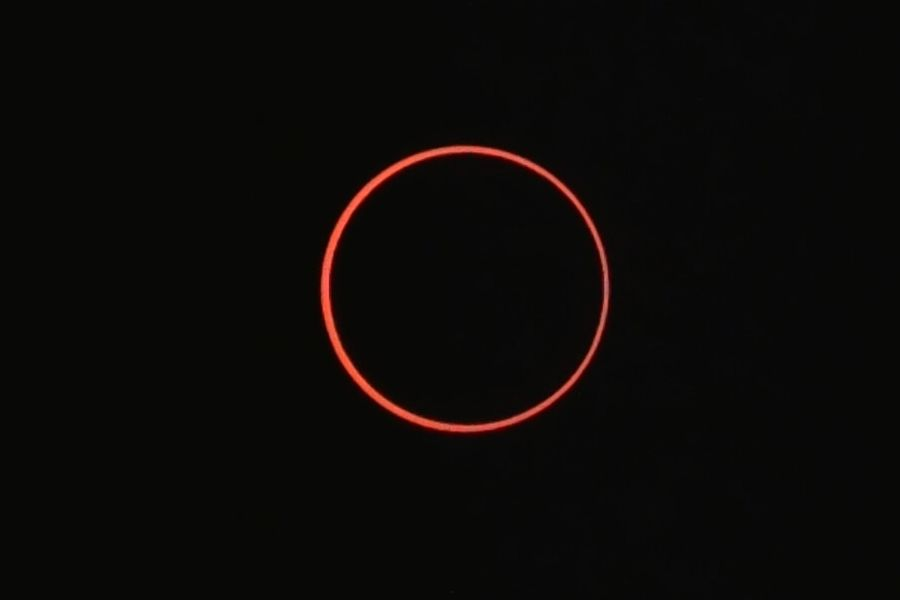
Merizo, Guam, 6:56 UTC

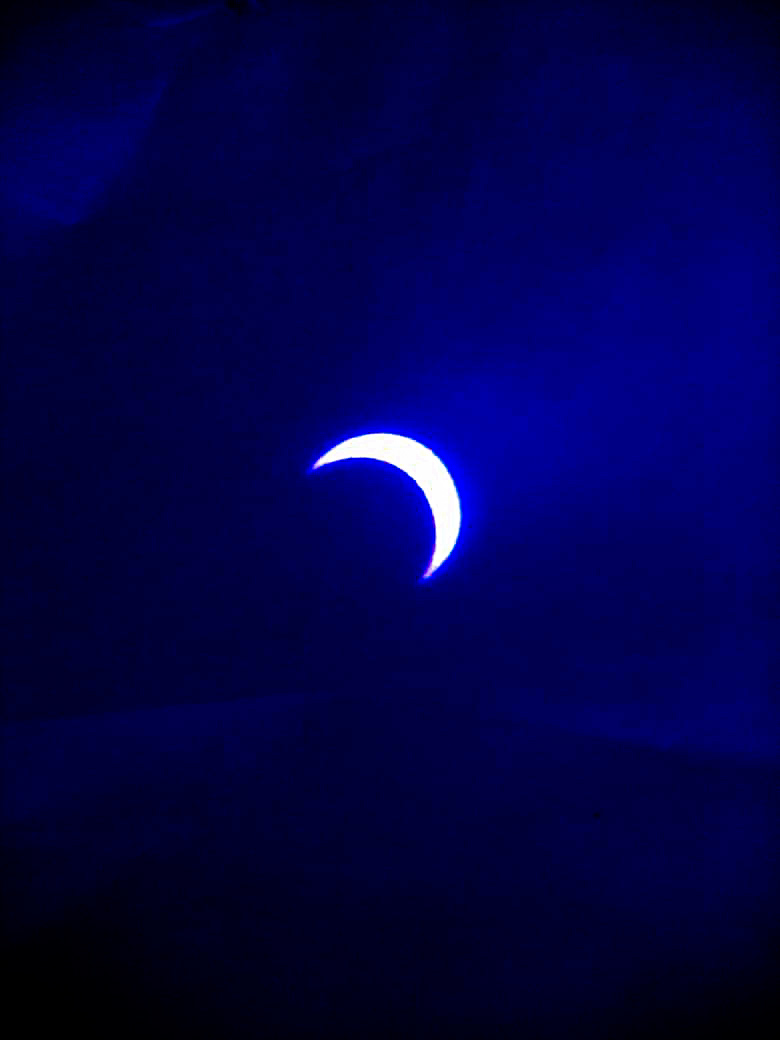
Partial (projection on a paper) from Chennai, India

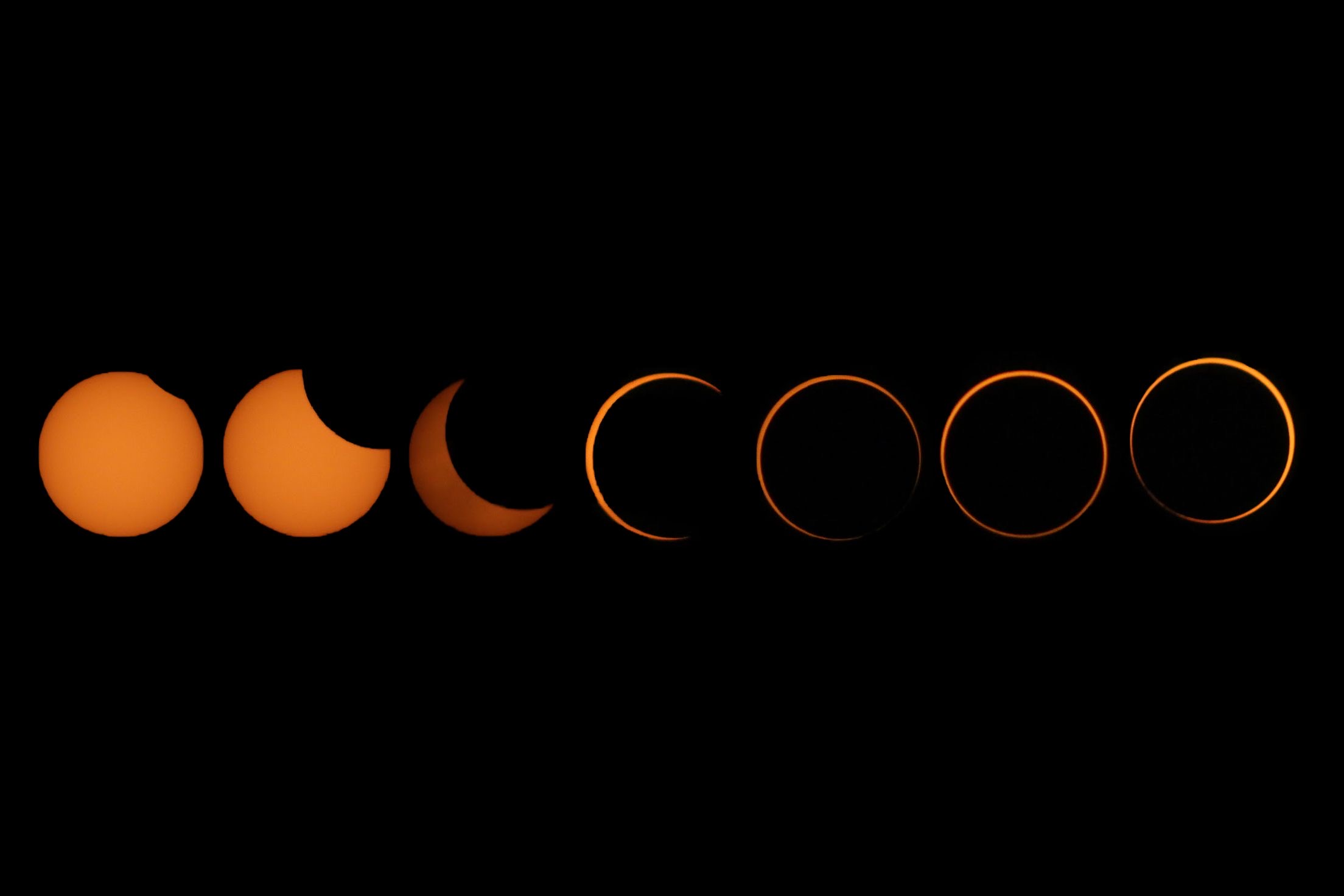
Eclipse progression from Batam, Indonesia

Time-lapse video of the eclipse as seen from Kinnigoli, India

== Eclipse details ==
Shown below are two tables displaying details about this particular solar eclipse. The first table outlines times at which the Moon's penumbra or umbra attains the specific parameter, and the second table describes various other parameters pertaining to this eclipse.

December 26, 2019 solar eclipse times
Event	Time (UTC)
First penumbral external contact	2019 December 26 at 02:31:00.8 UTC
First umbral external contact	2019 December 26 at 03:35:41.7 UTC
First central line	2019 December 26 at 03:37:13.6 UTC
First umbral internal contact	2019 December 26 at 03:38:45.8 UTC
First penumbral internal contact	2019 December 26 at 05:02:35.5 UTC
Ecliptic conjunction	2019 December 26 at 05:14:17.0 UTC
Equatorial conjunction	2019 December 26 at 05:15:43.8 UTC
Greatest eclipse	2019 December 26 at 05:18:53.1 UTC
Greatest duration	2019 December 26 at 05:29:39.4 UTC
Last penumbral internal contact	2019 December 26 at 05:35:14.2 UTC
Last umbral internal contact	2019 December 26 at 06:59:00.2 UTC
Last central line	2019 December 26 at 07:00:35.4 UTC
Last umbral external contact	2019 December 26 at 07:02:10.4 UTC
Last penumbral external contact	2019 December 26 at 08:06:53.4 UTC

December 26, 2019 solar eclipse parameters
Parameter	Value
Eclipse magnitude	0.97010
Eclipse obscuration	0.94110
Gamma	0.41351
Sun right ascension	18h17m56.7s
Sun declination	-23°22'19.2"
Sun semi-diameter	16'15.7"
Sun equatorial horizontal parallax	08.9"
Moon right ascension	18h18m03.7s
Moon declination	-22°58'50.4"
Moon semi-diameter	15'33.0"
Moon equatorial horizontal parallax	0°57'04.0"
ΔT	69.8 s

== Eclipse season ==
This eclipse is part of an eclipse season, a period, roughly every six months, when eclipses occur. Only two (or occasionally three) eclipse seasons occur each year, and each season lasts about 35 days and repeats just short of six months (173 days) later; thus two full eclipse seasons always occur each year. Either two or three eclipses happen each eclipse season. In the sequence below, each eclipse is separated by a fortnight.

Eclipse season of December 2019–January 2020
December 26 Descending node (new moon)	January 10 Ascending node (full moon)
Annular solar eclipse Solar Saros 132	Penumbral lunar eclipse Lunar Saros 144

== Related eclipses ==
=== Eclipses in 2019 ===
- A partial solar eclipse on January 6
- A total lunar eclipse on January 21
- A total solar eclipse on July 2
- A partial lunar eclipse on July 16
- An annular solar eclipse on December 26

Astronomers Without Borders collected eclipse glasses for redistribution to Latin America and Asia for their 2019 eclipses from the solar eclipse of August 21, 2017.

=== Metonic ===
- Preceded by: Solar eclipse of March 9, 2016
- Followed by: Solar eclipse of October 14, 2023

=== Tzolkinex ===
- Preceded by: Solar eclipse of November 13, 2012
- Followed by: Solar eclipse of February 6, 2027

=== Half-Saros ===
- Preceded by: Lunar eclipse of December 21, 2010
- Followed by: Lunar eclipse of December 31, 2028

=== Tritos ===
- Preceded by: Solar eclipse of January 26, 2009
- Followed by: Solar eclipse of November 25, 2030

=== Solar Saros 132 ===
- Preceded by: Solar eclipse of December 14, 2001
- Followed by: Solar eclipse of January 5, 2038

=== Inex ===
- Preceded by: Solar eclipse of January 15, 1991
- Followed by: Solar eclipse of December 5, 2048

=== Triad ===
- Preceded by: Solar eclipse of February 24, 1933
- Followed by: Solar eclipse of October 26, 2106

=== Solar eclipses of 2018–2021 ===
This eclipse is a member of a semester series. An eclipse in a semester series of solar eclipses repeats approximately every 177 days and 4 hours (a semester) at alternating nodes of the Moon's orbit.

The partial solar eclipses on February 15, 2018 and August 11, 2018 occur in the previous lunar year eclipse set.

Solar eclipse series sets from 2018 to 2021
Ascending node			Descending node		
Saros	Map	Gamma	Saros	Map	Gamma
117 Partial in Melbourne, Australia	July 13, 2018 Partial	−1.35423	122 Partial in Nakhodka, Russia	January 6, 2019 Partial	1.14174
127 Totality in La Serena, Chile	July 2, 2019 Total	−0.64656	132 Annularity in Jaffna, Sri Lanka	December 26, 2019 Annular	0.41351
137 Annularity in Beigang, Yunlin, Taiwan	June 21, 2020 Annular	0.12090	142 Totality in Gorbea, Chile	December 14, 2020 Total	−0.29394
147 Partial in Halifax, Canada	June 10, 2021 Annular	0.91516	152 From HMS Protector off South Georgia	December 4, 2021 Total	−0.95261

=== Saros 132 ===
This eclipse is a part of Saros series 132, repeating every 18 years, 11 days, and containing 71 events. The series started with a partial solar eclipse on August 13, 1208. It contains annular eclipses from March 17, 1569 through March 12, 2146; hybrid eclipses on March 23, 2164 and April 3, 2182; and total eclipses from April 14, 2200 through June 19, 2308. The series ends at member 71 as a partial eclipse on September 25, 2470. Its eclipses are tabulated in three columns; every third eclipse in the same column is one exeligmos apart, so they all cast shadows over approximately the same parts of the Earth.

The longest duration of annularity was produced by member 25 at 6 minutes, 56 seconds on May 9, 1641, and the longest duration of totality will be produced by member 61 at 2 minutes, 14 seconds on June 8, 2290. All eclipses in this series occur at the Moon’s descending node of orbit.

Series members 34–56 occur between 1801 and 2200:
34	35	36
August 17, 1803	August 27, 1821	September 7, 1839
37	38	39
September 18, 1857	September 29, 1875	October 9, 1893
40	41	42
October 22, 1911	November 1, 1929	November 12, 1947
43	44	45
November 23, 1965	December 4, 1983	December 14, 2001
46	47	48
December 26, 2019	January 5, 2038	January 16, 2056
49	50	51
January 27, 2074	February 7, 2092	February 18, 2110
52	53	54
March 1, 2128	March 12, 2146	March 23, 2164
55	56	
April 3, 2182	April 14, 2200	

=== Metonic series ===
The metonic series repeats eclipses every 19 years (6939.69 days), lasting about 5 cycles. Eclipses occur in nearly the same calendar date. In addition, the octon subseries repeats 1/5 of that or every 3.8 years (1387.94 days). All eclipses in this table occur at the Moon's descending node.

21 eclipse events between May 21, 1993 and May 20, 2069
May 20–21	March 9	December 25–26	October 13–14	August 1–2
118	120	122	124	126
May 21, 1993	March 9, 1997	December 25, 2000	October 14, 2004	August 1, 2008
128	130	132	134	136
May 20, 2012	March 9, 2016	December 26, 2019	October 14, 2023	August 2, 2027
138	140	142	144	146
May 21, 2031	March 9, 2035	December 26, 2038	October 14, 2042	August 2, 2046
148	150	152	154	156
May 20, 2050	March 9, 2054	December 26, 2057	October 13, 2061	August 2, 2065
158
May 20, 2069

=== Tritos series ===
This eclipse is a part of a tritos cycle, repeating at alternating nodes every 135 synodic months (≈ 3986.63 days, or 11 years minus 1 month). Their appearance and longitude are irregular due to a lack of synchronization with the anomalistic month (period of perigee), but groupings of 3 tritos cycles (≈ 33 years minus 3 months) come close (≈ 434.044 anomalistic months), so eclipses are similar in these groupings.

Series members between 1801 and 2200
September 8, 1801 (Saros 112)	August 7, 1812 (Saros 113)	July 8, 1823 (Saros 114)	June 7, 1834 (Saros 115)	May 6, 1845 (Saros 116)
April 5, 1856 (Saros 117)	March 6, 1867 (Saros 118)	February 2, 1878 (Saros 119)	January 1, 1889 (Saros 120)	December 3, 1899 (Saros 121)
November 2, 1910 (Saros 122)	October 1, 1921 (Saros 123)	August 31, 1932 (Saros 124)	August 1, 1943 (Saros 125)	June 30, 1954 (Saros 126)
May 30, 1965 (Saros 127)	April 29, 1976 (Saros 128)	March 29, 1987 (Saros 129)	February 26, 1998 (Saros 130)	January 26, 2009 (Saros 131)
December 26, 2019 (Saros 132)	November 25, 2030 (Saros 133)	October 25, 2041 (Saros 134)	September 22, 2052 (Saros 135)	August 24, 2063 (Saros 136)
July 24, 2074 (Saros 137)	June 22, 2085 (Saros 138)	May 22, 2096 (Saros 139)	April 23, 2107 (Saros 140)	March 22, 2118 (Saros 141)
February 18, 2129 (Saros 142)	January 20, 2140 (Saros 143)	December 19, 2150 (Saros 144)	November 17, 2161 (Saros 145)	October 17, 2172 (Saros 146)
September 16, 2183 (Saros 147)	August 16, 2194 (Saros 148)			

=== Inex series ===
This eclipse is a part of the long period inex cycle, repeating at alternating nodes, every 358 synodic months (≈ 10,571.95 days, or 29 years minus 20 days). Their appearance and longitude are irregular due to a lack of synchronization with the anomalistic month (period of perigee). However, groupings of 3 inex cycles (≈ 87 years minus 2 months) comes close (≈ 1,151.02 anomalistic months), so eclipses are similar in these groupings.

Series members between 1801 and 2200
May 16, 1817 (Saros 125)	April 25, 1846 (Saros 126)	April 6, 1875 (Saros 127)
March 17, 1904 (Saros 128)	February 24, 1933 (Saros 129)	February 5, 1962 (Saros 130)
January 15, 1991 (Saros 131)	December 26, 2019 (Saros 132)	December 5, 2048 (Saros 133)
November 15, 2077 (Saros 134)	October 26, 2106 (Saros 135)	October 7, 2135 (Saros 136)
September 16, 2164 (Saros 137)	August 26, 2193 (Saros 138)	
