= Solar eclipse of March 9, 2016 =

Total eclipse

- Total eclipse
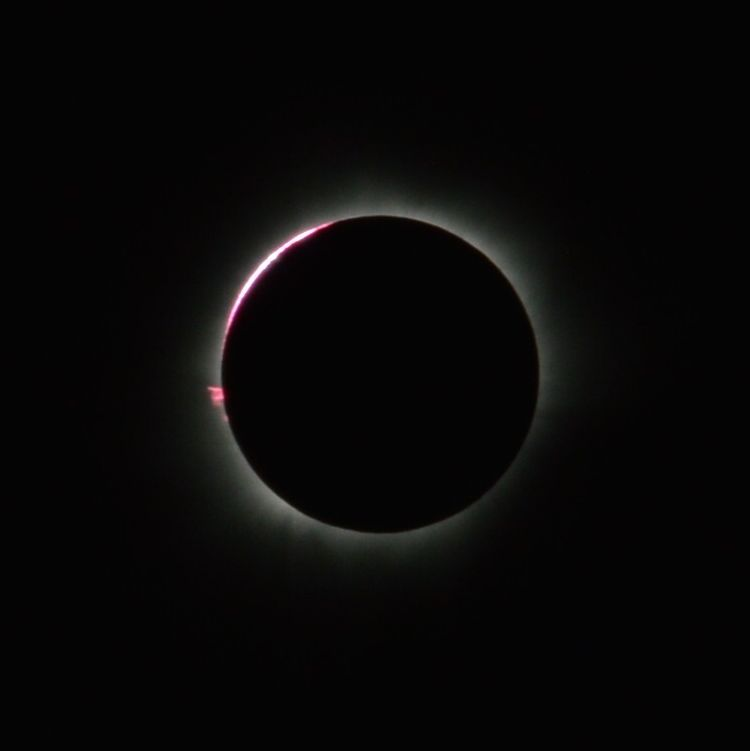
- Totality with Baily's beads from Balikpapan, Indonesia

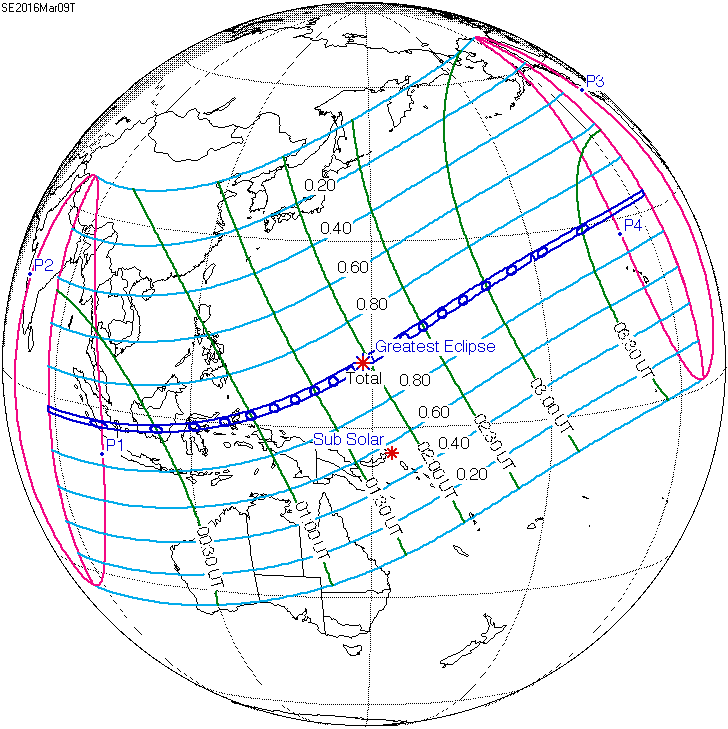
- Map
- Gamma: 0.2609
- Magnitude: 1.045

Maximum eclipse
- Duration: 249 s (4 min 9 s)
- Coordinates: 10.1°N 148.8°E
- Max. width of band: 155 km (96 mi)

Times (UTC)
- Greatest eclipse: 1:58:19

References
- Saros: 130 (52 of 73)
- Catalog # (SE5000): 9543

A total solar eclipse occurred at the Moon's descending node of orbit between Tuesday, March 8 and Wednesday, March 9, 2016, with a magnitude of 1.045. A total solar eclipse occurs when the Moon's apparent diameter is larger than the Sun's and the apparent path of the Sun and Moon intersect, blocking all direct sunlight and turning daylight into darkness; the Sun appears to be black with a halo around it. Totality occurs in a narrow path across Earth's surface, with the partial solar eclipse visible over a surrounding region thousands of kilometres wide. Occurring about 1.25 days before perigee (on March 10, 2016, at 7:00 UTC), the Moon's apparent diameter was larger.

Totality was visible from parts of Indonesia and Micronesia. A partial eclipse was visible for parts of Southeast Asia, East Asia, Alaska, northwestern Australia, and Hawaii. If viewed from east of the International Date Line (for instance from Hawaii), the eclipse took place on March 8 (Tuesday) (local time) and elsewhere on March 9 (Wednesday).

The eclipse was clearly visible in many parts of Indonesia, including Central Sulawesi and Ternate, but obscured by clouds and smokes in Palembang, the largest city on the path of totality. The eclipse coincided with Nyepi, a public holiday in Indonesia and the end of the Balinese saka calendar. Because Nyepi is normally a day of silence, Muslims in Bali had to be given special dispensation to attend special prayer services during the eclipse.

== Path of the eclipse ==
On March 9, 2016, a large area of the Pacific, covering Indonesia, Borneo, but also large parts of Southeast Asia and Australia, witnessed a partial solar eclipse. It was total in multiple islands of Indonesia, three atolls of the Federated States of Micronesia (Eauripik, Woleai and Ifalik) and the central Pacific, starting at sunrise over Sumatra and ending at sunset north of Hawaii. In the Eastern Pacific Ocean, the totality exceeded a duration of more than 4 minutes. Much of East Asia witnessed more than 50% partial eclipse.

The largest city along the path of totality was Palembang in southern Sumatra (423 km (263 mi) from Jakarta and 478 km (297 mi) from Singapore).

In order to watch the total solar eclipse, Alaska Airlines adjusted the flight plan for Flight 870. The flight passed through the umbral shadow about 695 miles (1,118 km) north of Hawaii.

== Maps ==
Animation assembled from 13 images acquired by NASA's Earth Polychromatic Imaging Camera atop the DSCOVR satellite.
Path of the eclipse in Southeast Asia
Path of the eclipse in Indonesia

== Eclipse timing ==
=== Places experiencing total eclipse ===
Solar Eclipse of March 9, 2016 (Local Times)
Country or territory	City or place	Start of partial eclipse	Start of total eclipse	Maximum eclipse	End of total eclipse	End of partial eclipse	Duration of totality (min:s)	Duration of eclipse (hr:min)	Maximum magnitude
Indonesia	Palembang	06:20:32	07:20:53	07:21:49	07:22:45	08:31:33	1:52	2:11	1.0092
Indonesia	Palangka Raya	06:23:31	07:29:00	07:30:15	07:31:30	08:46:59	2:30	2:23	1.0163
Indonesia	Balikpapan	07:25:40	08:34:01	08:34:29	08:34:58	09:53:45	0:57	2:28	1.0015
Indonesia	Palu	07:27:52	08:37:49	08:38:51	08:39:54	10:00:37	2:05	2:33	1.0064
Indonesia	Ternate	08:36:06	09:51:42	09:53:03	09:54:24	11:20:55	2:42	2:45	1.0091
Indonesia	Sofifi	08:36:15	09:51:51	09:53:20	09:54:50	11:21:19	2:59	2:45	1.012

=== Places experiencing partial eclipse ===
Solar Eclipse of March 9, 2016 (Local Times)
Country or territory	City or place	Start of partial eclipse	Maximum eclipse	End of partial eclipse	Duration of eclipse (hr:min)	Maximum coverage
Cocos (Keeling) Islands	Bantam	06:05:44 (sunrise)	06:45:13	07:45:43	1:40	64.54%
Christmas Island	Flying Fish Cove	06:19:57	07:19:17	08:26:13	2:06	71.73%
Indonesia	Jakarta	06:19:55	07:21:38	08:31:50	2:12	89.09%
Malaysia	Kuala Lumpur	07:24:26	08:23:51	09:31:09	2:10	79.38%
Singapore	Singapore	07:23:03	08:23:52	09:33:03	2:10	86.87%
India	Port Blair	05:30:46 (sunrise)	05:56:37	06:53:58	1:23	48.95%
Thailand	Bangkok	06:38:52	07:32:33	08:32:29	1:54	41.86%
Myanmar	Yangon	06:17:45 (sunrise)	07:03:21	07:57:31	1:40	32.57%
Cambodia	Phnom Penh	06:36:05	07:33:40	08:38:33	2:02	49.33%
Vietnam	Ho Chi Minh City	06:35:18	07:34:25	08:41:18	2:06	52.34%
Brunei	Bandar Seri Begawan	07:30:23	08:37:33	09:54:43	2:24	76.50%
Timor-Leste	Dili	08:30:09	09:41:23	11:02:21	2:32	70.32%
Vietnam	Hanoi	06:57:04	07:46:04	08:39:59	1:43	22.26%
Australia	Darwin	09:07:32	10:17:15	11:35:04	2:28	50.21%
Philippines	General Santos	07:39:58	08:55:09	10:20:56	2:41	79.93%
Philippines	Davao City	07:41:49	08:57:10	10:23:00	2:41	76.89%
Hong Kong	Hong Kong	08:05:24	08:58:24	09:56:43	1:51	21.96%
Philippines	Manila	07:51:14	08:58:32	10:14:24	2:23	47.18%
Palau	Ngerulmud	08:53:50	10:17:11	11:49:18	2:55	87.10%
Papua New Guinea	Mount Hagen	10:00:15	11:21:43	12:48:32	2:48	55.76%
Papua New Guinea	Port Moresby	10:08:20	11:24:07	12:43:39	2:35	38.36%
Guam	Hagåtña	10:21:57	11:51:46	13:24:04	3:02	84.27%
Northern Mariana Islands	Saipan	10:27:17	11:56:57	13:28:08	3:01	80.36%
Federated States of Micronesia	Weno	10:28:21	12:01:09	13:33:19	3:05	88.22%
Japan	Tokyo	10:12:16	11:08:25	12:05:15	1:53	15.30%
Federated States of Micronesia	Palikir	11:45:06	13:16:45	14:44:17	2:59	72.62%
Marshall Islands	Majuro	13:27:30	14:48:32	16:01:44	2:34	46.94%
United States Minor Outlying Islands	Wake Island	13:22:30	14:51:28	16:12:10	2:50	99.54%
United States Minor Outlying Islands	Midway Atoll (Note: The times listed for this location occur on March 8, 2016, local time.)	15:04:03	16:20:43	17:29:11	2:25	97.15%
United States	Honolulu	16:33:28	17:36:35	18:33:19	2:00	63.40%

== Gallery ==
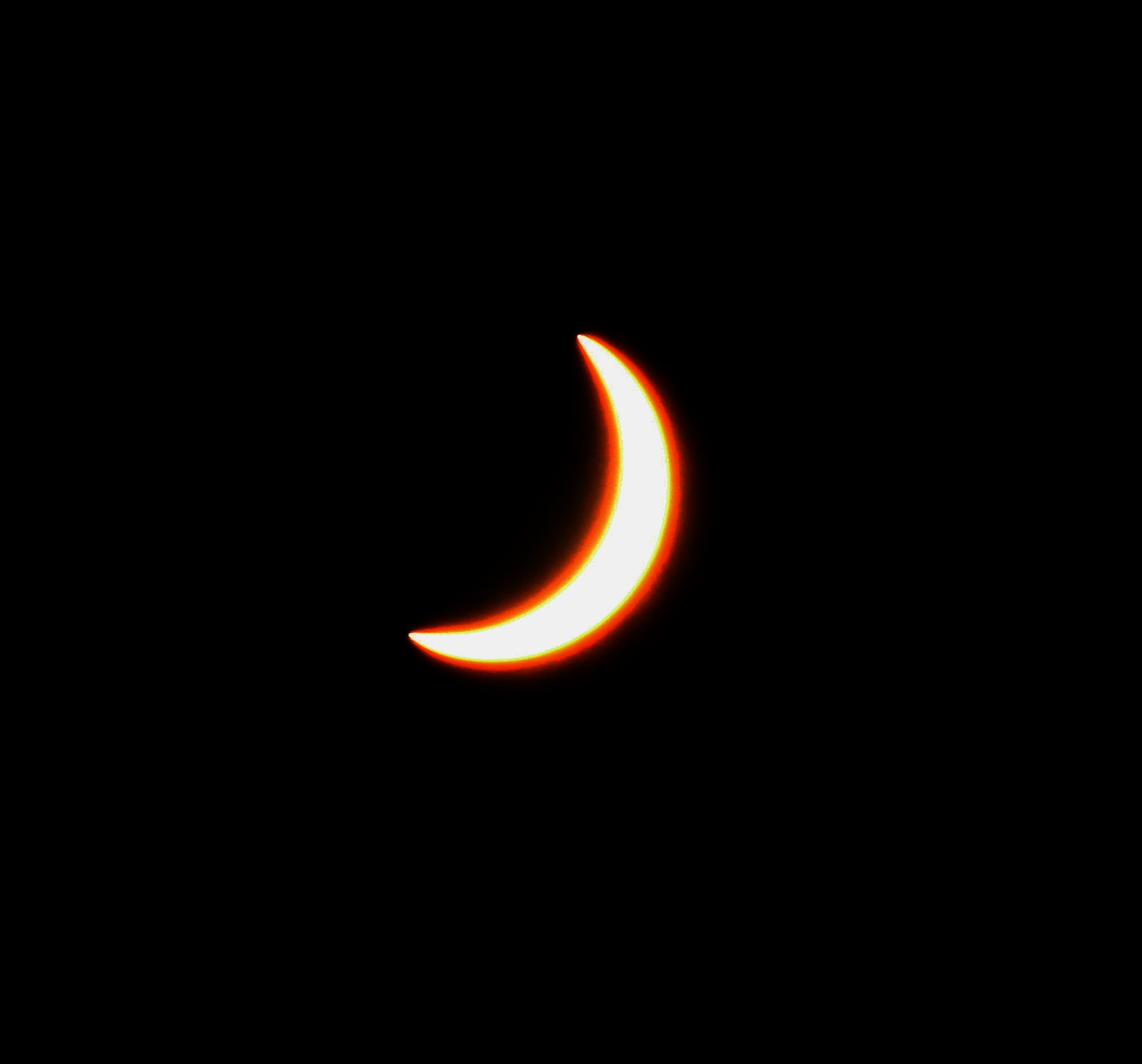
Partial in Jakarta, Indonesia, 0:23 UTC

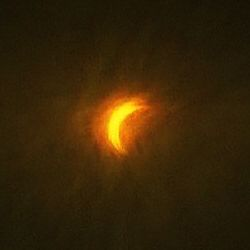
Partial in Nanyang Technological University, Singapore, 0:23 UTC

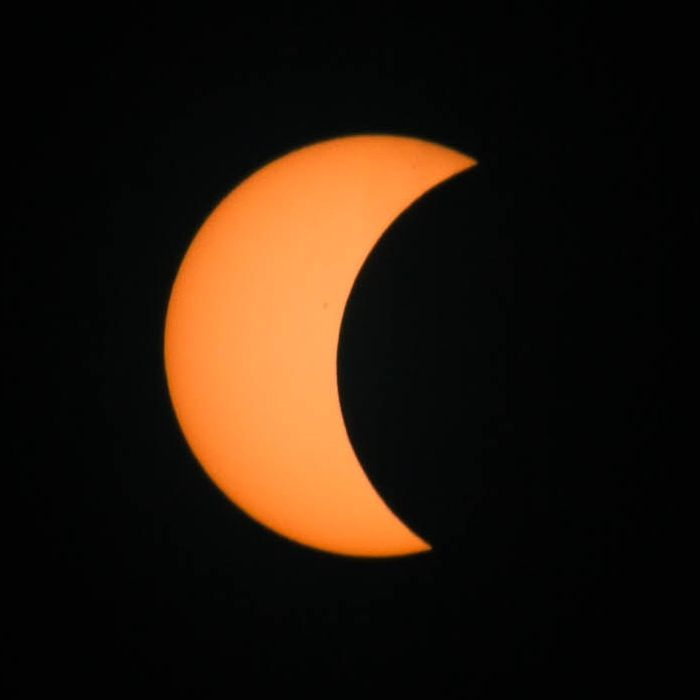
Partial in Ho Chi Minh City, Vietnam, 0:26 UTC

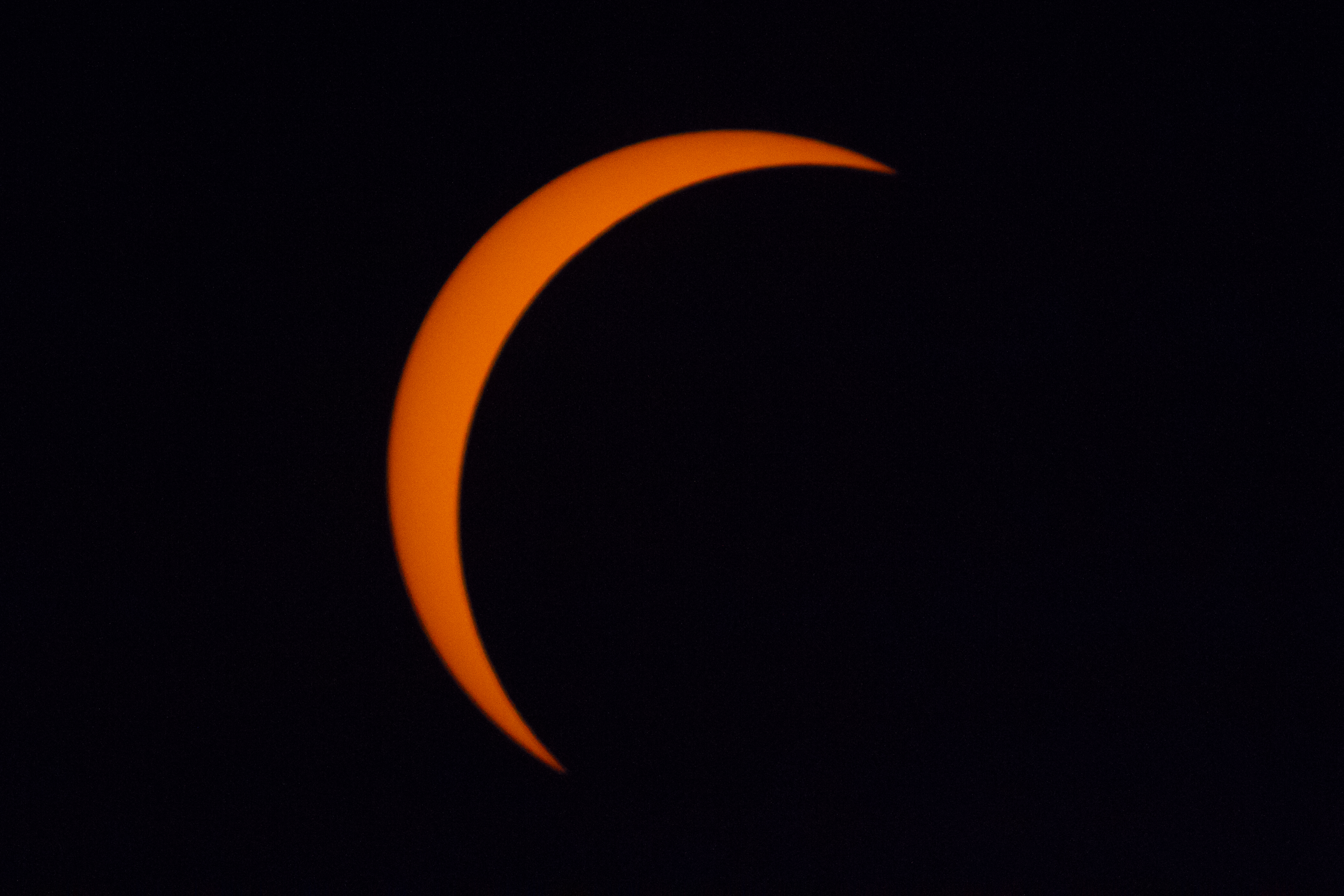
Partial in Marina Bay, Singapore, 0:26 UTC

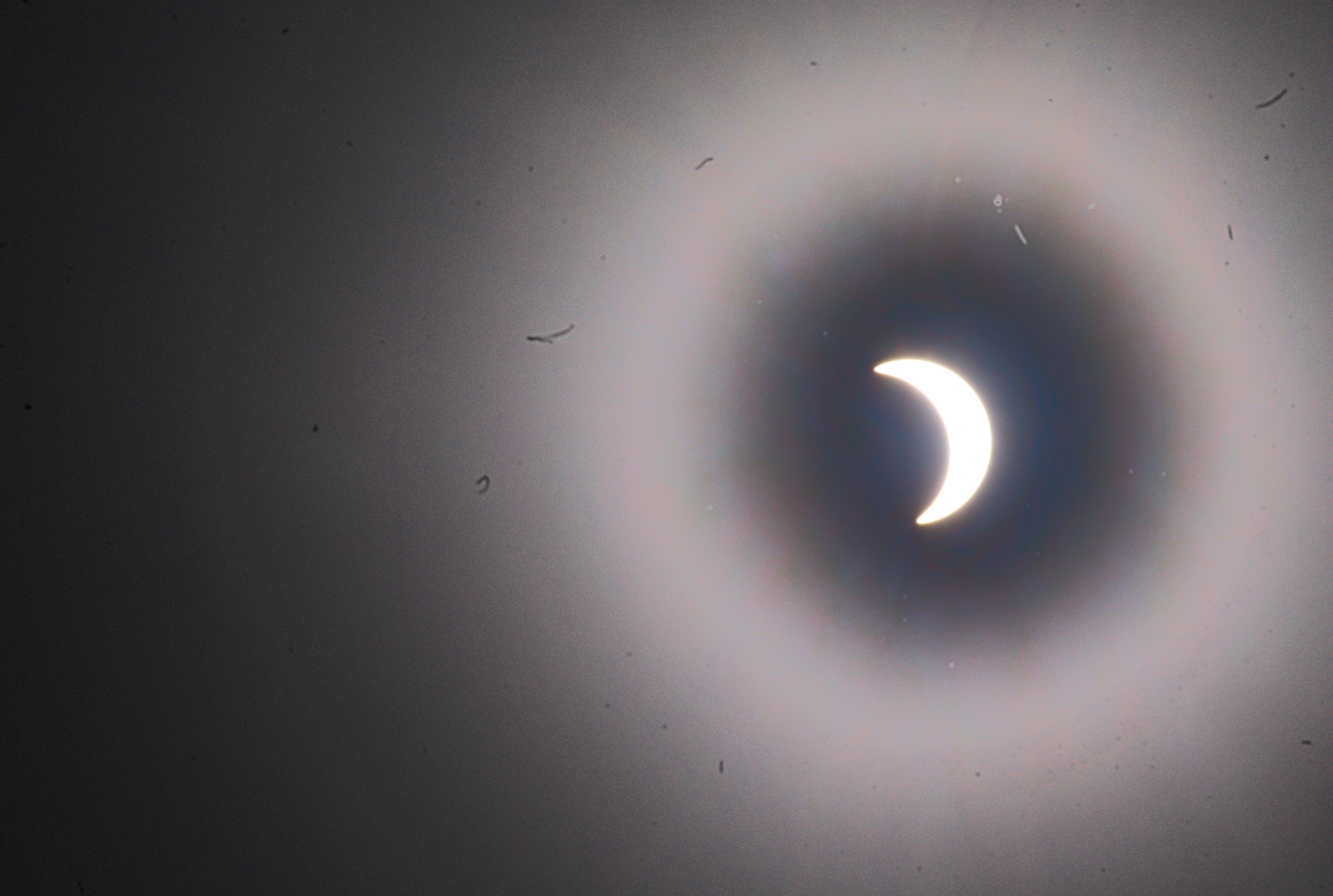
Partial in Dompu, Indonesia, 0:38 UTC

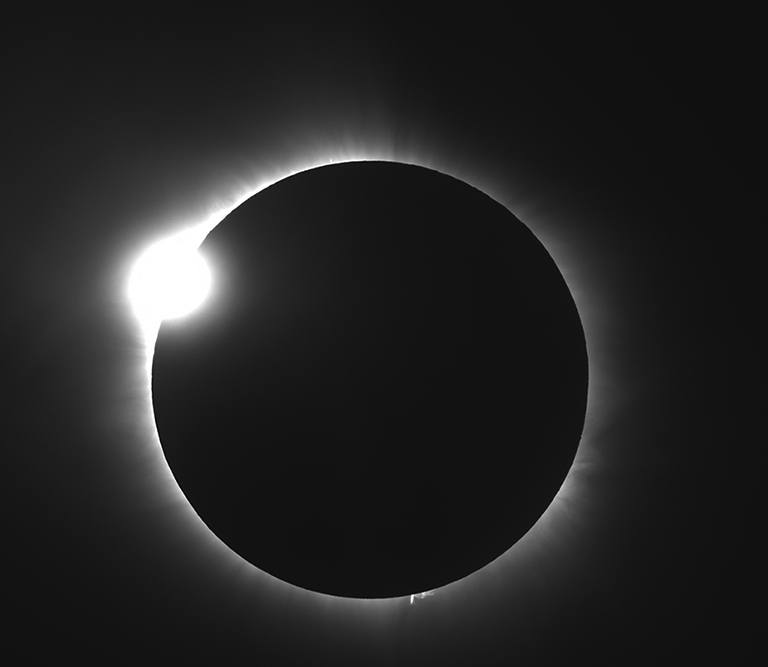
Diamond ring effect in Tanjung Pandan, Indonesia. 0:42 UTC

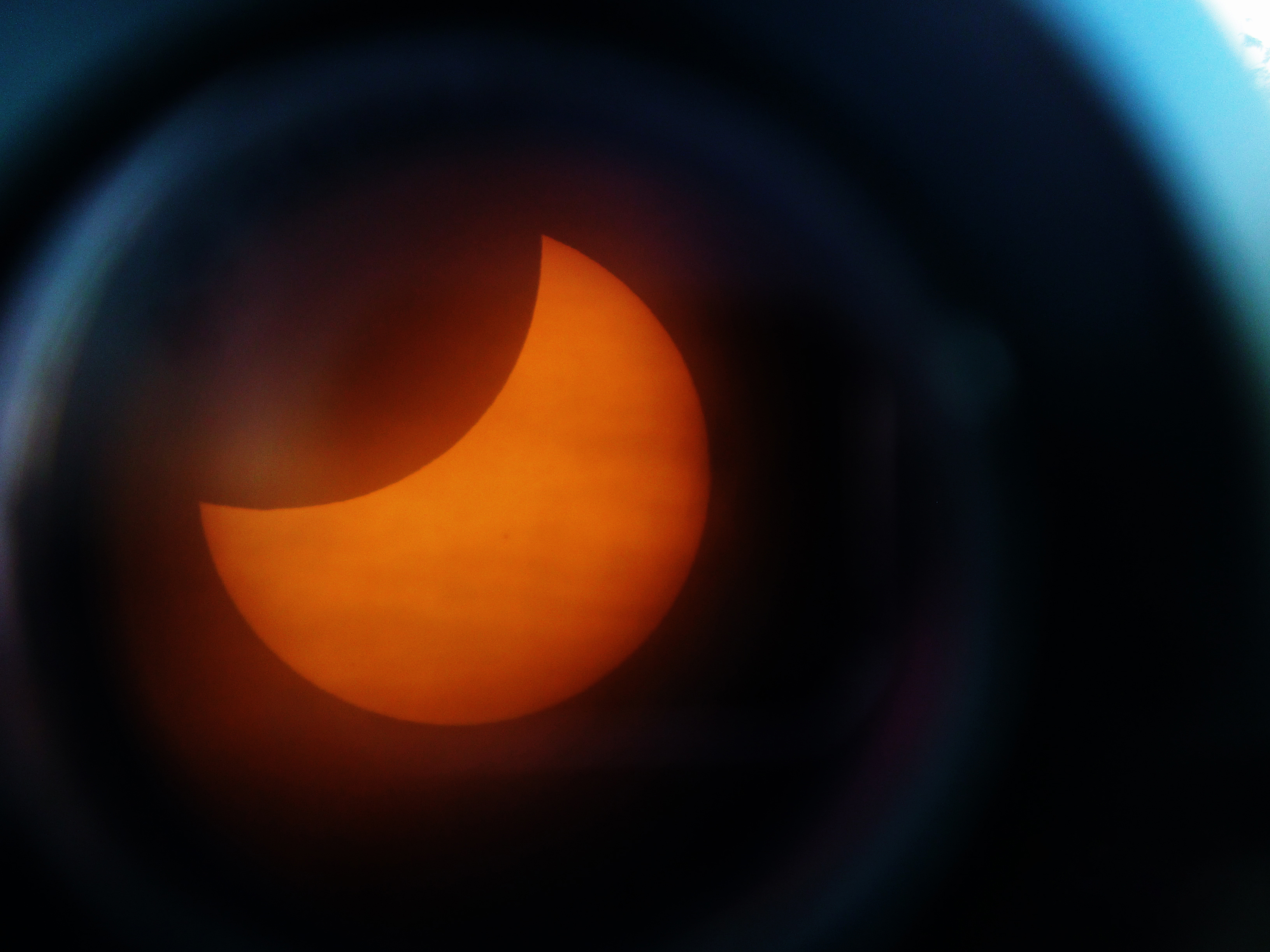
Partial in Khon Kaen University, Thailand, 0:46 UTC

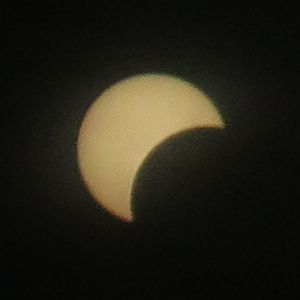
Partial in Nonthaburi, Thailand, 0:52 UTC

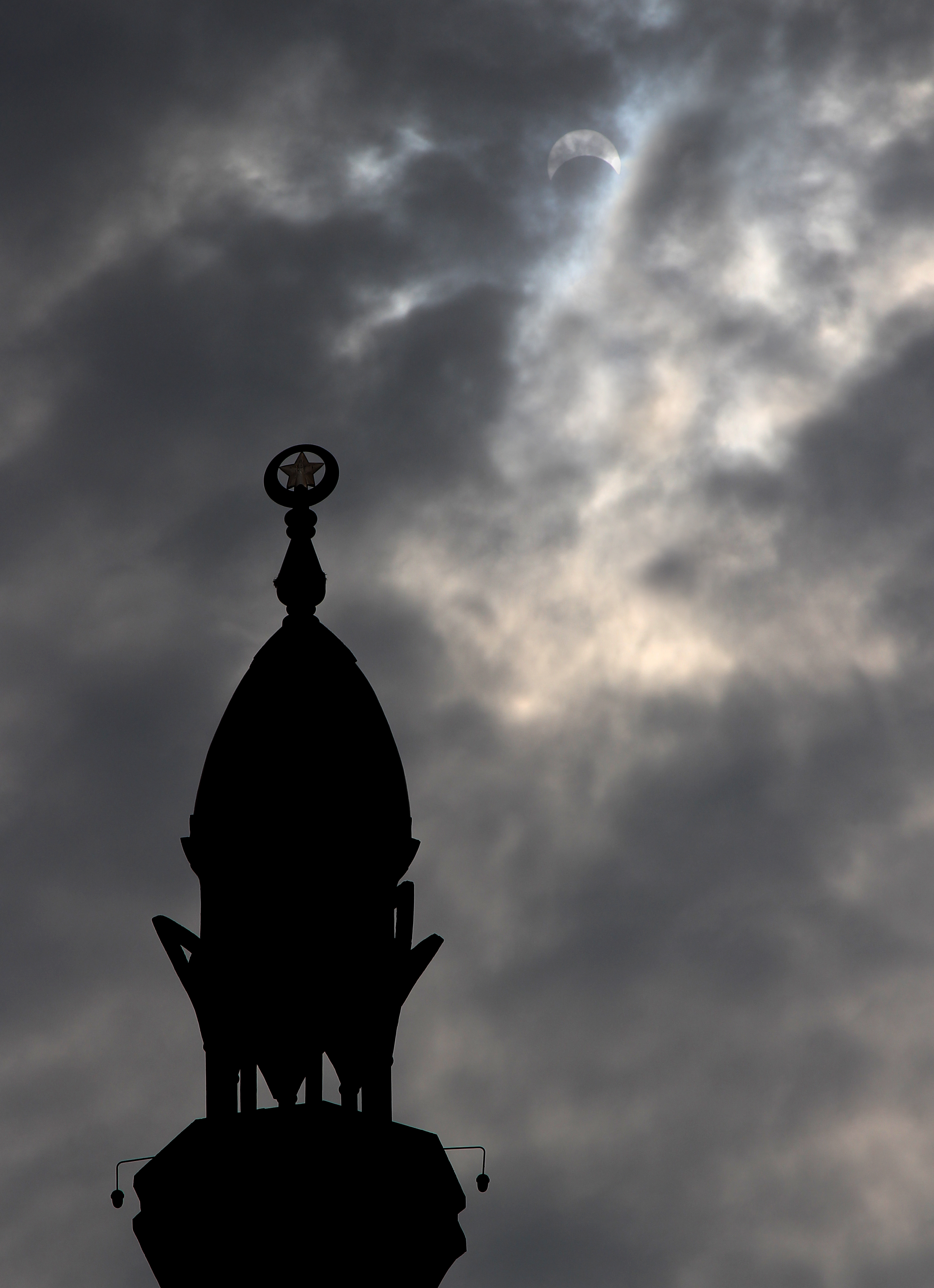
Partial in Jerudong, Brunei, 1:01 UTC

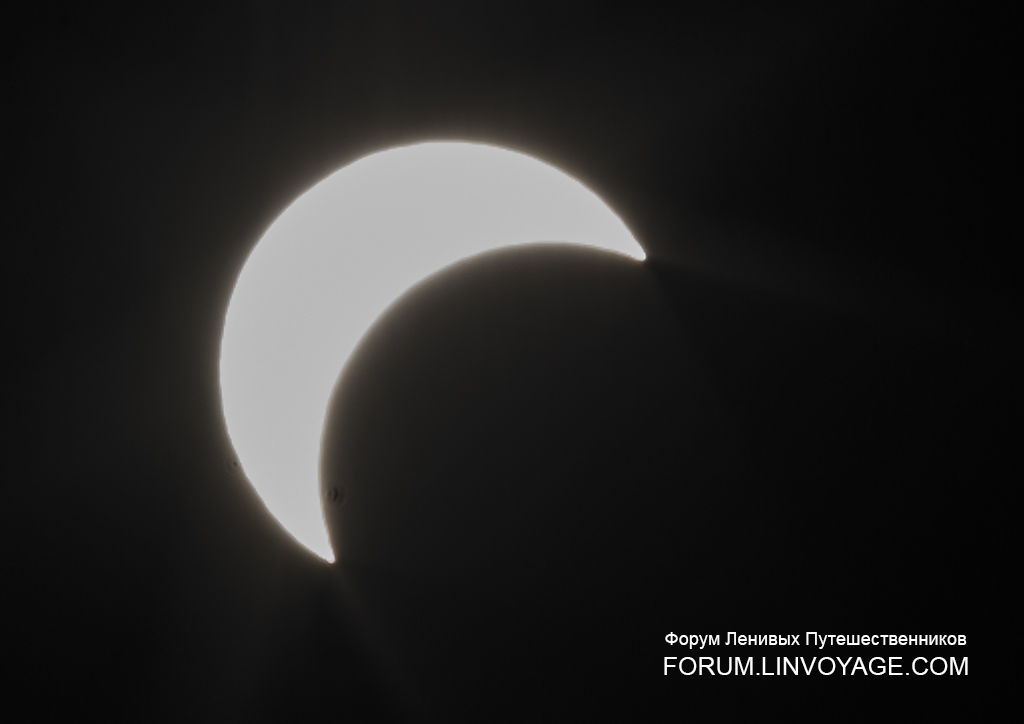
Partial in Langkawi, Malaysia, 1:16 UTC

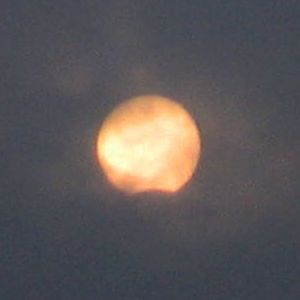
Partial in Hefei, China, 1:40 UTC

== Eclipse details ==
Shown below are two tables displaying details about this particular solar eclipse. The first table outlines times at which the Moon's penumbra or umbra attains the specific parameter, and the second table describes various other parameters pertaining to this eclipse.

March 9, 2016 Solar Eclipse Times
Event	Time (UTC)
First Penumbral External Contact	2016 March 8 at 23:20:28.3 UTC
First Umbral External Contact	2016 March 9 at 00:17:05.3 UTC
First Central Line	2016 March 9 at 00:17:51.5 UTC
First Umbral Internal Contact	2016 March 9 at 00:18:37.8 UTC
First Penumbral Internal Contact	2016 March 9 at 01:18:48.1 UTC
Ecliptic Conjunction	2016 March 9 at 01:55:37.5 UTC
Greatest Duration	2016 March 9 at 01:57:59.8 UTC
Greatest Eclipse	2016 March 9 at 01:58:19.5 UTC
Equatorial Conjunction	2016 March 9 at 02:06:49.1 UTC
Last Penumbral Internal Contact	2016 March 9 at 08:37:36.7 UTC
Last Umbral Internal Contact	2016 March 9 at 03:37:53.0 UTC
Last Central Line	2016 March 9 at 03:38:40.8 UTC
Last Umbral External Contact	2016 March 9 at 03:39:28.6 UTC
Last Penumbral External Contact	2016 March 9 at 04:36:03.3 UTC

March 9, 2016 Solar Eclipse Parameters
Parameter	Value
Eclipse Magnitude	1.04499
Eclipse Obscuration	1.09200
Gamma	0.26092
Sun Right Ascension	23h19m17.6s
Sun Declination	-04°22'46.4"
Sun Semi-Diameter	16'06.5"
Sun Equatorial Horizontal Parallax	08.9"
Moon Right Ascension	23h18m58.7s
Moon Declination	-04°07'40.6"
Moon Semi-Diameter	16'33.5"
Moon Equatorial Horizontal Parallax	1°00'46.2"
ΔT	68.1 s

== Eclipse season ==
This eclipse is part of an eclipse season, a period, roughly every six months, when eclipses occur. Only two (or occasionally three) eclipse seasons occur each year, and each season lasts about 35 days and repeats just short of six months (173 days) later; thus two full eclipse seasons always occur each year. Either two or three eclipses happen each eclipse season. In the sequence below, each eclipse is separated by a fortnight.

Eclipse season of March 2016
March 9 Descending node (new moon)	March 23 Ascending node (full moon)
Total solar eclipse Solar Saros 130	Penumbral lunar eclipse Lunar Saros 142

== Related eclipses ==
=== Eclipses in 2016 ===
- A total solar eclipse on March 9.
- A penumbral lunar eclipse on March 23.
- A penumbral lunar eclipse on August 18.
- An annular solar eclipse on September 1.
- A penumbral lunar eclipse on September 16.

=== Metonic ===
- Preceded by: Solar eclipse of May 20, 2012
- Followed by: Solar eclipse of December 26, 2019

=== Tzolkinex ===
- Preceded by: Solar eclipse of January 26, 2009
- Followed by: Solar eclipse of April 20, 2023

=== Half-Saros ===
- Preceded by: Lunar eclipse of March 3, 2007
- Followed by: Lunar eclipse of March 14, 2025

=== Tritos ===
- Preceded by: Solar eclipse of April 8, 2005
- Followed by: Solar eclipse of February 6, 2027

=== Solar Saros 130 ===
- Preceded by: Solar eclipse of February 26, 1998
- Followed by: Solar eclipse of March 20, 2034

=== Inex ===
- Preceded by: Solar eclipse of March 29, 1987
- Followed by: Solar eclipse of February 16, 2045

=== Triad ===
- Preceded by: Solar eclipse of May 9, 1929
- Followed by: Solar eclipse of January 8, 2103

=== Solar eclipses of 2015–2018 ===
This eclipse is a member of a semester series. An eclipse in a semester series of solar eclipses repeats approximately every 177 days and 4 hours (a semester) at alternating nodes of the Moon's orbit.

The partial solar eclipse on July 13, 2018 occurs in the next lunar year eclipse set.

Solar eclipse series sets from 2015 to 2018
Descending node			Ascending node		
Saros	Map	Gamma	Saros	Map	Gamma
120 Totality in Longyearbyen, Svalbard	March 20, 2015 Total	0.94536	125 Solar Dynamics Observatory	September 13, 2015 Partial	−1.10039
130 Balikpapan, Indonesia	March 9, 2016 Total	0.26092	135 Annularity in L'Étang-Salé, Réunion	September 1, 2016 Annular	−0.33301
140 Partial from Buenos Aires, Argentina	February 26, 2017 Annular	−0.45780	145 Totality in Madras, OR, USA	August 21, 2017 Total	0.43671
150 Partial in Olivos, Buenos Aires, Argentina	February 15, 2018 Partial	−1.21163	155 Partial in Huittinen, Finland	August 11, 2018 Partial	1.14758

=== Saros 130 ===
This eclipse is a part of Saros series 130, repeating every 18 years, 11 days, and containing 73 events. The series started with a partial solar eclipse on August 20, 1096. It contains total eclipses from April 5, 1475 through July 18, 2232. There are no annular or hybrid eclipses in this set. The series ends at member 73 as a partial eclipse on October 25, 2394. Its eclipses are tabulated in three columns; every third eclipse in the same column is one exeligmos apart, so they all cast shadows over approximately the same parts of the Earth.

The longest duration of totality was produced by member 30 at 6 minutes, 41 seconds on July 11, 1619. All eclipses in this series occur at the Moon’s descending node of orbit.

Series members 41–62 occur between 1801 and 2200:
41	42	43
November 9, 1817	November 20, 1835	November 30, 1853
44	45	46
December 12, 1871	December 22, 1889	January 3, 1908
47	48	49
January 14, 1926	January 25, 1944	February 5, 1962
50	51	52
February 16, 1980	February 26, 1998	March 9, 2016
53	54	55
March 20, 2034	March 30, 2052	April 11, 2070
56	57	58
April 21, 2088	May 3, 2106	May 14, 2124
59	60	61
May 25, 2142	June 4, 2160	June 16, 2178
62
June 26, 2196

=== Metonic series ===
The metonic series repeats eclipses every 19 years (6939.69 days), lasting about 5 cycles. Eclipses occur in nearly the same calendar date. In addition, the octon subseries repeats 1/5 of that or every 3.8 years (1387.94 days). All eclipses in this table occur at the Moon's descending node.

21 eclipse events between May 21, 1993 and May 20, 2069
May 20–21	March 9	December 25–26	October 13–14	August 1–2
118	120	122	124	126
May 21, 1993	March 9, 1997	December 25, 2000	October 14, 2004	August 1, 2008
128	130	132	134	136
May 20, 2012	March 9, 2016	December 26, 2019	October 14, 2023	August 2, 2027
138	140	142	144	146
May 21, 2031	March 9, 2035	December 26, 2038	October 14, 2042	August 2, 2046
148	150	152	154	156
May 20, 2050	March 9, 2054	December 26, 2057	October 13, 2061	August 2, 2065
158
May 20, 2069

=== Tritos series ===
This eclipse is a part of a tritos cycle, repeating at alternating nodes every 135 synodic months (≈ 3986.63 days, or 11 years minus 1 month). Their appearance and longitude are irregular due to a lack of synchronization with the anomalistic month (period of perigee), but groupings of 3 tritos cycles (≈ 33 years minus 3 months) come close (≈ 434.044 anomalistic months), so eclipses are similar in these groupings.

Series members between 1801 and 2200
October 19, 1808 (Saros 111)	September 19, 1819 (Saros 112)	August 18, 1830 (Saros 113)	July 18, 1841 (Saros 114)	June 17, 1852 (Saros 115)
May 17, 1863 (Saros 116)	April 16, 1874 (Saros 117)	March 16, 1885 (Saros 118)	February 13, 1896 (Saros 119)	January 14, 1907 (Saros 120)
December 14, 1917 (Saros 121)	November 12, 1928 (Saros 122)	October 12, 1939 (Saros 123)	September 12, 1950 (Saros 124)	August 11, 1961 (Saros 125)
July 10, 1972 (Saros 126)	June 11, 1983 (Saros 127)	May 10, 1994 (Saros 128)	April 8, 2005 (Saros 129)	March 9, 2016 (Saros 130)
February 6, 2027 (Saros 131)	January 5, 2038 (Saros 132)	December 5, 2048 (Saros 133)	November 5, 2059 (Saros 134)	October 4, 2070 (Saros 135)
September 3, 2081 (Saros 136)	August 3, 2092 (Saros 137)	July 4, 2103 (Saros 138)	June 3, 2114 (Saros 139)	May 3, 2125 (Saros 140)
April 1, 2136 (Saros 141)	March 2, 2147 (Saros 142)	January 30, 2158 (Saros 143)	December 29, 2168 (Saros 144)	November 28, 2179 (Saros 145)
October 29, 2190 (Saros 146)

=== Inex series ===
This eclipse is a part of the long period inex cycle, repeating at alternating nodes, every 358 synodic months (≈ 10,571.95 days, or 29 years minus 20 days). Their appearance and longitude are irregular due to a lack of synchronization with the anomalistic month (period of perigee). However, groupings of 3 inex cycles (≈ 87 years minus 2 months) comes close (≈ 1,151.02 anomalistic months), so eclipses are similar in these groupings.

Series members between 1801 and 2200
July 27, 1813 (Saros 123)	July 8, 1842 (Saros 124)	June 18, 1871 (Saros 125)
May 28, 1900 (Saros 126)	May 9, 1929 (Saros 127)	April 19, 1958 (Saros 128)
March 29, 1987 (Saros 129)	March 9, 2016 (Saros 130)	February 16, 2045 (Saros 131)
January 27, 2074 (Saros 132)	January 8, 2103 (Saros 133)	December 19, 2131 (Saros 134)
November 27, 2160 (Saros 135)	November 8, 2189 (Saros 136)	
