= List of solar eclipses visible from Russia =

This list of solar eclipses visible from Russia enumerates the solar eclipses that have been seen and will be seen in Russia.

== 20th century (RSFSR and Russian Federation) ==
=== Total and annular eclipses ===
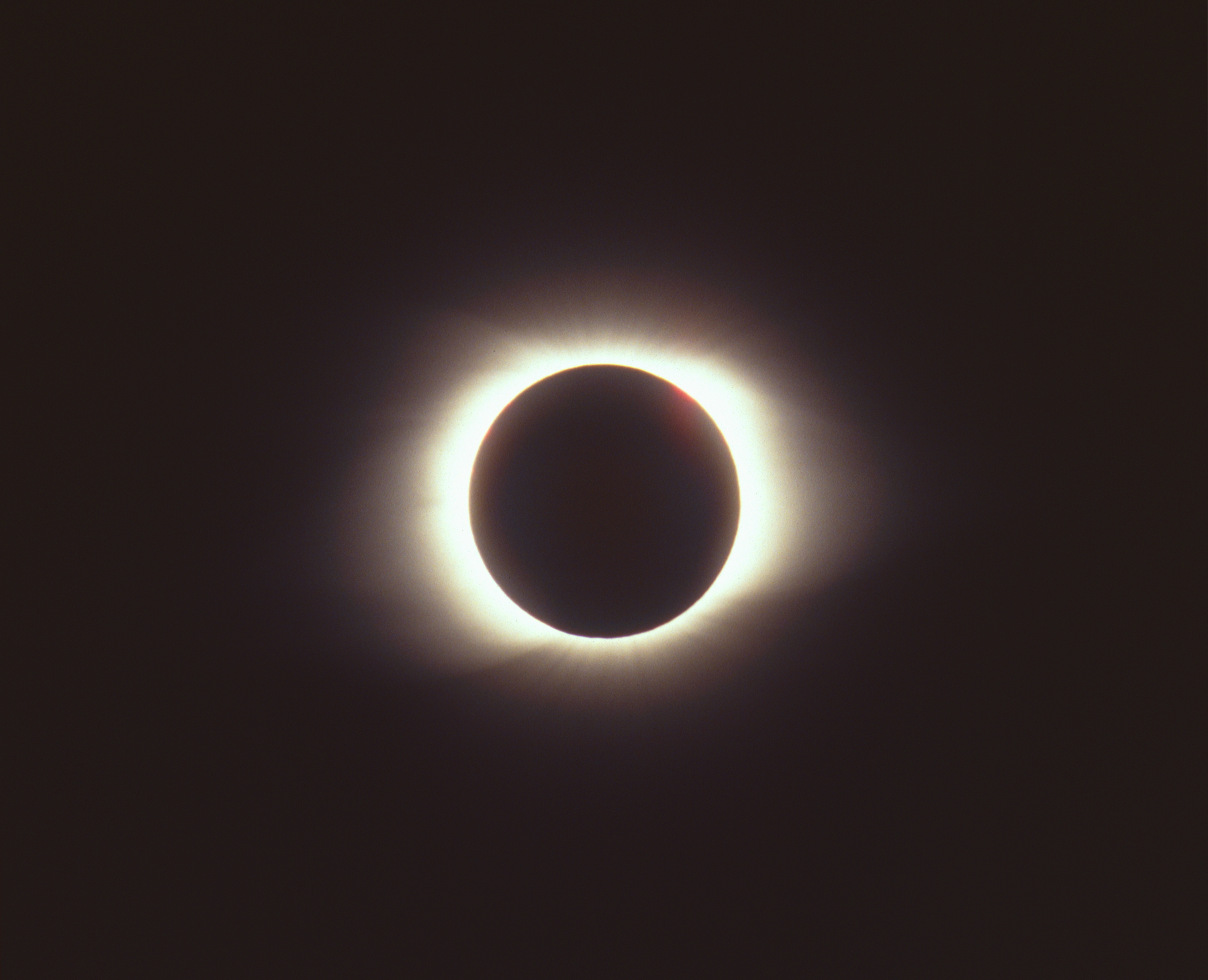
Total eclipse of March 9, 1997 from Chita

- Solar eclipse of April 8, 1921 (Severnaya Zemlya archipelago)
- Solar eclipse of June 29, 1927 (northern Russia)
- Solar eclipse of June 19, 1936 (south of European Russia and Siberia)
- Solar eclipse of April 19, 1939 (Franz Josef Land, Ushakov Island and Vize Island)
- Solar eclipse of September 21, 1941 (south of European Russia)
- Solar eclipse of February 4, 1943 (Primorsky Krai)
- Solar eclipse of July 9, 1945 (European Russia)
- Solar eclipse of May 9, 1948 (Kuril Islands)
- Solar eclipse of September 12, 1950 (Russian Far East)
- Solar eclipse of February 25, 1952 (western Siberia)
- Solar eclipse of June 30, 1954 (south of European Russia)
- Solar eclipse of April 30, 1957 (north-east of European Russia)
- Solar eclipse of February 15, 1961
- Solar eclipse of July 20, 1963 (Kuril Islands)
- Solar eclipse of May 20, 1966 (south of European Russia)
- Solar eclipse of September 22, 1968 (the Urals)
- Solar eclipse of July 10, 1972 (Russian Far East)
- Solar eclipse of July 31, 1981 (southern Russia)
- Solar eclipse of July 22, 1990 (northern Russia)
- Solar eclipse of March 9, 1997 (Russian Far East)

April 8, 1921 Annular	June 29, 1927 Total	June 19, 1936 Total	April 19, 1939 Annular	September 21, 1941 Total
February 4, 1943 Total	July 9, 1945 Total	May 9, 1948 Annular	September 12, 1950 Total	February 25, 1952 Total
June 30, 1954 Total	April 30, 1957 Annular	February 15, 1961 Total	July 20, 1963 Total	May 20, 1966 Annular
September 22, 1968 Total	July 10, 1972 Total	July 31, 1981 Total	July 22, 1990 Total	March 9, 1997 Total

=== Partial eclipses ===
- Solar eclipse of June 8, 1918 (Russian Far East)
- Solar eclipse of March 28, 1922 (European Russia)
- Solar eclipse of September 10, 1923 (Chukchi Peninsula and Kamchatka Peninsula)
- Solar eclipse of August 30, 1924 ()
- Solar eclipse of July 9, 1926 ()
- Solar eclipse of June 17, 1928 ()
- Solar eclipse of November 12, 1928 ()
- Solar eclipse of April 18, 1931 (Siberia)
- Solar eclipse of September 12, 1931 (Chukchi Peninsula)
- Solar eclipse of August 31, 1932 ()
- Solar eclipse of August 21, 1933 (European Russia, the Urals, southwestern Siberia)
- Solar eclipse of February 14, 1934 (Russian Far East)
- Solar eclipse of June 30, 1935 ()
- Solar eclipse of November 21, 1938 ()
- Solar eclipse of July 20, 1944 (south regions)
- Solar eclipse of April 28, 1949 (north-west of European Russia, northern Russia)
- Solar eclipse of February 14, 1953 (Russian Far East)
- Solar eclipse of June 20, 1955 (Primorsky Krai)
- Solar eclipse of December 14, 1955 (south regions)
- Solar eclipse of December 2, 1956
- Solar eclipse of April 19, 1958
- Solar eclipse of October 2, 1959 (European Russia)
- Solar eclipse of September 20, 1960 (Russian Far East)
- Solar eclipse of December 4, 1964 (Russian Far East)
- Solar eclipse of November 23, 1965
- Solar eclipse of May 9, 1967 (north of European Russia)
- Solar eclipse of February 25, 1971 (European Russia, the Urals)
- Solar eclipse of July 22, 1971 (Russian Far East)
- Solar eclipse of May 11, 1975 (all)
- Solar eclipse of April 29, 1976
- Solar eclipse of October 2, 1978
- Solar eclipse of July 20, 1982 (north of Russia)
- Solar eclipse of December 15, 1982 (European Russia, south-west of Siberia)
- Solar eclipse of May 19, 1985 (northeast Russia)
- Solar eclipse of September 23, 1987
- Solar eclipse of March 18, 1988 (eastern Siberia)
- Solar eclipse of December 24, 1992 (Russian Far East)
- Solar eclipse of May 21, 1993 (European Russia)
- Solar eclipse of May 10, 1994 (Chukchi Peninsula)
- Solar eclipse of October 24, 1995 (Siberia)
- Solar eclipse of October 12, 1996 (European Russia)
- Solar eclipse of August 11, 1999 (all Russia except Russian Far East)
- Solar eclipse of July 31, 2000 (northern Russia)

== 21st century ==
=== Total and annular eclipses ===
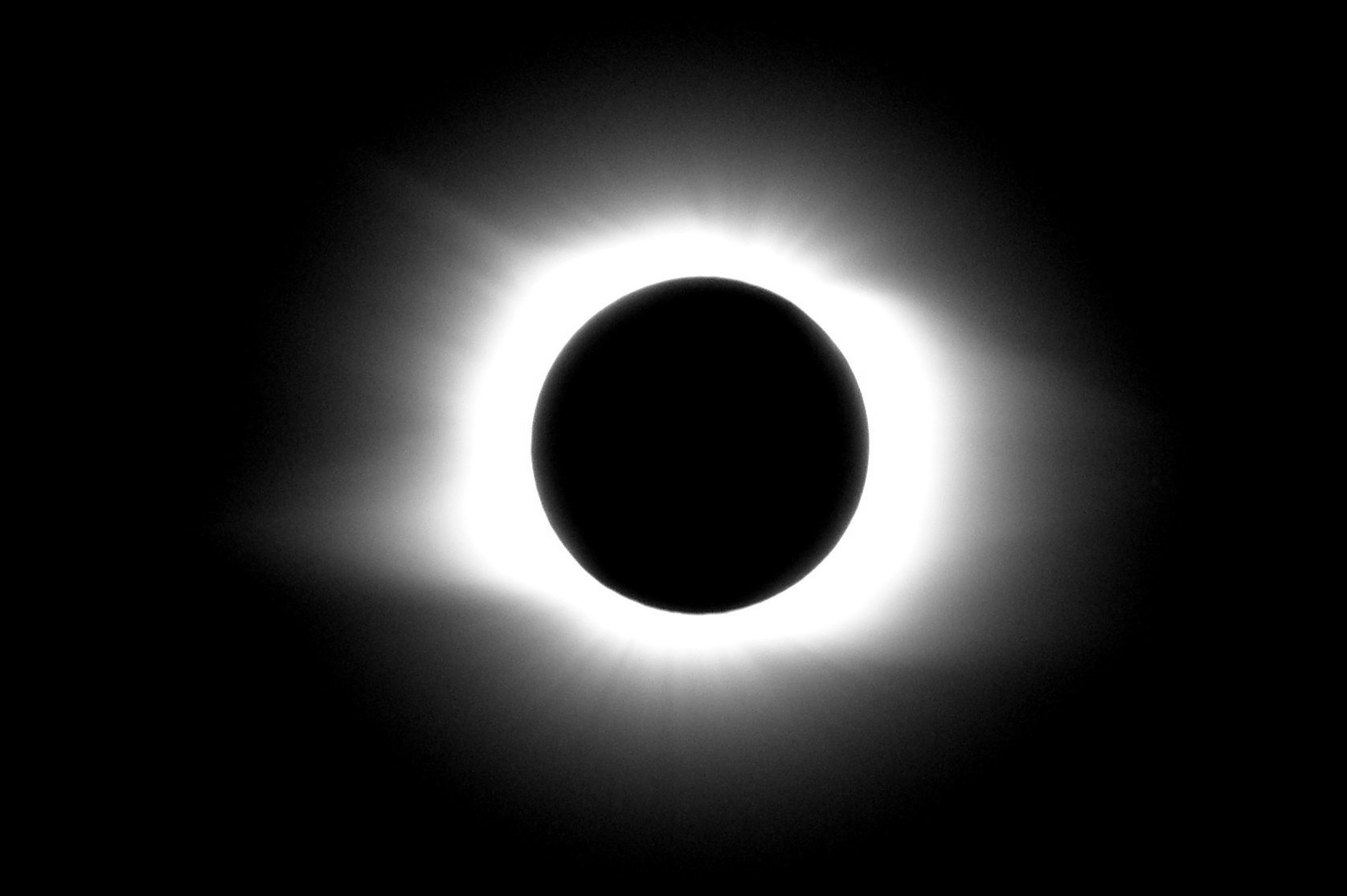
Total eclipse of August 1, 2008 from Novosibirsk

- Solar eclipse of March 29, 2006 (south of European Russia)
- Solar eclipse of August 1, 2008 (western Siberia)
- Solar eclipse of June 10, 2021 (east of Yakutia)
- Solar eclipse of August 12, 2026 (Taymyr Peninsula)
- Solar eclipse of June 1, 2030
- Solar eclipse of March 30, 2033 (Chukotka Autonomous Okrug)
- Solar eclipse of June 21, 2039 (west part of European Russia)
- Solar eclipse of April 9, 2043 (Kamchatka Peninsula and Magadan Oblast)
- Solar eclipse of June 11, 2048 (European Russia)
- Solar eclipse of July 1, 2057 (Russian Far East)
- Solar eclipse of April 30, 2060 (south of Dagestan)
- Solar eclipse of April 20, 2061 (European Russia and Urals)
- Solar eclipse of August 24, 2063 (south of Primorsky Krai)
- Solar eclipse of June 22, 2066 (Kamchatka Peninsula, Chukchi Peninsula)
- Solar eclipse of September 12, 2072 (Siberia)
- Solar eclipse of July 13, 2075
- Solar eclipse of July 3, 2084 (north of Russia)
- Solar eclipse of April 21, 2088 (North Caucasus)
- Solar eclipse of May 11, 2097 (Murmansk Oblast)

March 29, 2006 Total	August 1, 2008 Total	June 10, 2021 Annular	August 12, 2026 Total	June 1, 2030 Annular
March 30, 2033 Total	June 21, 2039 Annular	April 9, 2043 Total	June 11, 2048 Annular	July 1, 2057 Annular
April 30, 2060 Total	April 20, 2061 Total	August 24, 2063 Total	June 22, 2066 Annular	September 12, 2072 Total
July 13, 2075 Annular	July 3, 2084 Annular	April 21, 2088 Total	May 11, 2097 Total	

=== Partial eclipses ===
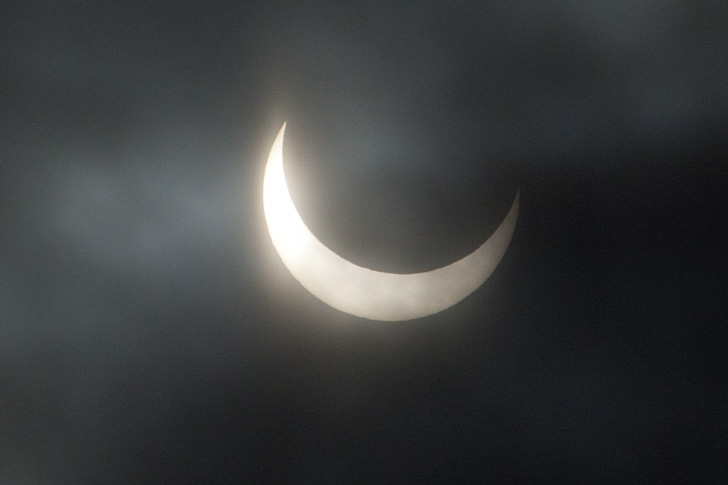
Partial eclipse of January 4, 2011 from Moscow

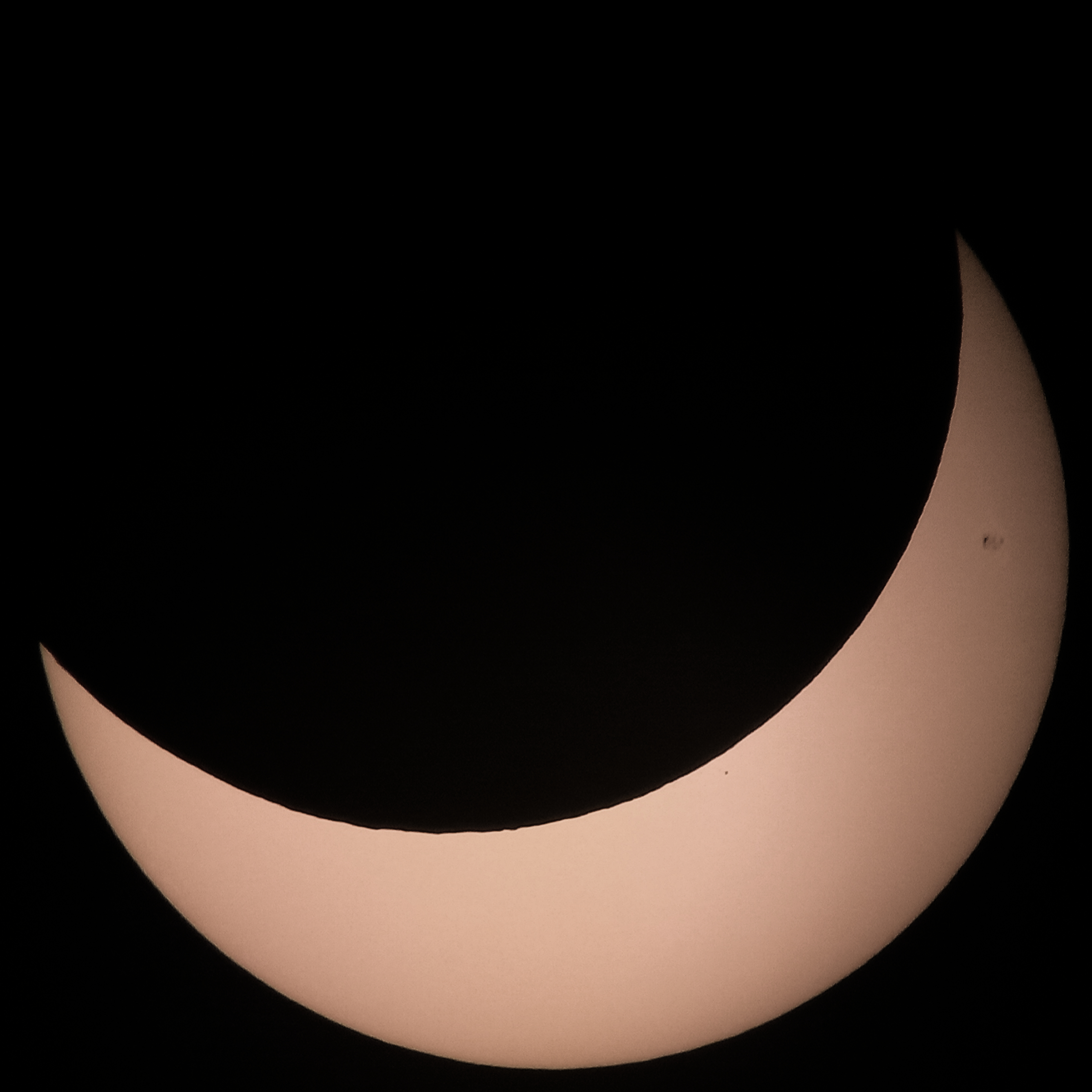
Partial eclipse of October 25, 2022 from Saratov

- Solar eclipse of June 10, 2002 (Russian Far East)
- Solar eclipse of May 31, 2003
- Solar eclipse of October 14, 2004 (Siberia)
- Solar eclipse of October 3, 2005 (European Russia)
- Solar eclipse of March 19, 2007 (Siberia and east of European Russia)
- Solar eclipse of July 22, 2009 (south of Siberia)
- Solar eclipse of January 15, 2010 (south of European Russia)
- Solar eclipse of January 4, 2011 (European Russia and south-west of Siberia)
- Solar eclipse of June 1, 2011 (Arctic and north-east of Siberia)
- Solar eclipse of May 20, 2012 (Siberia)
- Solar eclipse of October 23, 2014 (east regions of Russian Far East)
- Solar eclipse of March 20, 2015 (western Russia)
- Solar eclipse of March 9, 2016 (Khabarovsk Krai, Primorsky Krai, Sakhalin, Kamchatka and Chukchi peninsulas)
- Solar eclipse of August 21, 2017 (Chukchi Peninsula, north of Kamchatka Peninsula)
- Solar eclipse of August 11, 2018 (European Russia to north-east of Velikiye Luki–Moscow–Balakovo border and Siberia except east regions of Russia Far East)
- Solar eclipse of January 6, 2019 (Russian Far East)
- Solar eclipse of June 21, 2020 (south part of Russia)
- Solar eclipse of October 25, 2022 (European Russia)
- Solar eclipse of March 29, 2025 (north-west and northern parts of Russia)
- Solar eclipse of August 2, 2027 (European Russia, except north-east part)
- Solar eclipse of June 12, 2029 (northern Russia)
- Solar eclipse of November 3, 2032 (?)
- Solar eclipse of March 20, 2034 (south-west part of Russia)
- Solar eclipse of September 2, 2035 (Siberia)
- Solar eclipse of August 21, 2036 (north-west part of Russia)
- Solar eclipse of January 16, 2037 (?)
- Solar eclipse of January 5, 2038 (Kaliningrad Oblast, Crimea)
- Solar eclipse of July 2, 2038 (Crimea, North Caucasus)
- Solar eclipse of October 25, 2041 (Russian Far East)
- Solar eclipse of April 20, 2042 (Russian Far East)
- Solar eclipse of August 23, 2044 (Siberia, north-east of European Russia)
- Solar eclipse of August 12, 2045 (Chukchi Peninsula)
- Solar eclipse of February 5, 2046 (Primorsky Krai)

== 22nd century ==
=== Total and annular eclipses ===
- Solar eclipse of February 28, 2101
- Solar eclipse of July 15, 2102
- Solar eclipse of October 5, 2108
- Solar eclipse of May 24, 2115
- Solar eclipse of September 26, 2117
- Solar eclipse of March 22, 2118
- Solar eclipse of July 25, 2120
- Solar eclipse of May 14, 2124
- Solar eclipse of October 16, 2126
- Solar eclipse of August 15, 2129
- Solar eclipse of June 3, 2133
- Solar eclipse of April 1, 2136
- Solar eclipse of January 8, 2141
- Solar eclipse of May 25, 2142
- Solar eclipse of April 2, 2155
- Solar eclipse of August 5, 2157
- Solar eclipse of November 7, 2162
- Solar eclipse of August 25, 2166
- Solar eclipse of June 25, 2169
- Solar eclipse of October 29, 2171
- Solar eclipse of January 29, 2177
- Solar eclipse of June 16, 2178
- Solar eclipse of April 3, 2182
- Solar eclipse of September 4, 2184
- Solar eclipse of July 6, 2187
- Solar eclipse of August 26, 2193
- Solar eclipse of February 10, 2195
- Solar eclipse of June 26, 2196

February 28, 2101 Annular	July 15, 2102 Annular	October 5, 2108 Total	May 24, 2115 Total	September 26, 2117 Total	March 22, 2118 Annular
July 25, 2120 Annular	May 14, 2124 Total	October 16, 2126 Total	August 15, 2129 Annular	June 3, 2133 Total	April 1, 2136 Annular
January 8, 2141 Annular	May 25, 2142 Total	April 2, 2155 Annular	August 5, 2157 Annular	November 7, 2162 Total	August 25, 2166 Annular
June 25, 2169 Total	October 29, 2171 Total	January 29, 2177 Annular	June 16, 2178 Total	April 3, 2182 Hybrid	September 4, 2184 Annular
July 6, 2187 Total	August 26, 2193 Annular	February 10, 2195 Annular	June 26, 2196 Total		

== Eclipses for major cities in next 10 years ==
Cities with a population of more than one million people, Kaliningrad and the top five cities by population of the Far East are listed here. Obscuration and moment of time with maximum magnitude (UTC) are indicated. Annular and total eclipses in cities are market with bold.

City	2027-08-02	2029-06-12	2030-06-01
Chelyabinsk	—	—	89,12% 05:58
Chita	—	—	88,59% 07:22
Kaliningrad	23,38% 09:21	6,92% 02:57	59,08% 05:27
Kazan	2,15% 09:51	—	80,30% 05:45
Khabarovsk	—	—	87,50% 07:45
Krasnodar	32,15% 09:50	—	88,61% 05:17
Krasnoyarsk	—	—	89,26% 06:48
Moscow	9,25% 09:39	1,61% 02:52	71,30% 05:36
Nizhny Novgorod	4,42% 09:45	0,39% 02:52	75,18% 05:42
Novosibirsk	—	—	88,50% 06:32
Omsk	—	—	89,30% 06:16
Perm	—	—	79,71% 05:56
Rostov-on-Don	25,56% 09:49	—	88,64% 05:21
Saint Petersburg	6,25% 09:30	6,70% 03:01	57,83% 05:40
Samara	4,29% 09:55	—	87,01% 05:42
Ulan-Ude	—	—	85,40% 07:15
Ufa	0,20% 09:59	—	87,50% 05:51
Vladivostok	—	—	82,49% 07:53
Voronezh	15,99% 09:44	—	81,34% 05:29
Yakutsk	—	—	63,28% 07:18
Yekaterinburg	—	—	85,13% 06:00

== Total and annular eclipses between 1001 and 2300 in cities ==
=== Chelyabinsk ===
- 1874 Oct 10 (Annular)
- 2061 Apr 20 (Total)
- 2141 Jan 8 (Annular)

=== Chita ===
- 1583 Dec 14 (Annular)
- 1719 Feb 19 (Annular)
- 1746 Mar 22 (Annular)
- 1997 Mar 9 (Total)
- 2057 July 1 (Annular)

=== Dudinka ===
- 2133 Jun 01 (Total)

=== Irkutsk ===
- 1661 Mar 30 (Total)
- 1802 Aug 28 (Annular)
- 1852 Dec 11 (Total)
- 1887 Aug 19 (Total)
- 2281 Jun 17 (Total)

=== Kaliningrad ===
- 2195 Feb 10 (Annular)

=== Kazan ===
- 1120 Oct 24 (Annular)
- 1185 May 01 (Total)
- 1236 Aug 03 (Annular)
- 1261 Apr 01 (Annular)
- 1487 Jul 20 (Total)
- 1551 Aug 31 (Total)
- 1708 Sep 14 (Total)
- 1762 Oct 17 (Total)
- 1827 Apr 26 (Annular)
- 2195 Feb 10 (Annular)
- 2214 Jul 08 (Total)
- 2236 May 06 (Total)
- 2249 Mar 15 (Annular)

=== Khabarovsk ===
- 1936 Jun 19 (Total)
- 2124 May 14 (Total)
- 2202 Sep 17 (Annular)

=== Krasnodar ===
- 1793 Sep 05 (Annular)
- 1851 Jul 28 (Total)
- 1936 Jun 19 (Total)
- 2030 Jun 01 (Annular)
- 2249 Mar 15 (Annular)

=== Krasnoyarsk ===
- 1692 Feb 17 (Annular)
- 1773 Mar 23 (Annular)
- 1829 Sep 28 (Annular)
- 1887 Aug 19 (Total)
- 2030 Jun 01 (Annular)
- 2115 May 24 (Total)
- 2276 Mar 16 (Annular)
- 2287 Aug 10 (Annular)

=== Moscow ===
- 1415 Jun 07 (Total)
- 1476 Feb 25 (Total)
- 1518 Jun 08 (Annular)
- 1827 Apr 26 (Annular)
- 1887 Aug 19 (Total)
- 2075 Jul 13 (Annular)
- 2126 Oct 16 (Total)
- 2195 Feb 10 (Annular)
- 2296 Aug 29 (Annular)

=== Nizhny Novgorod ===
- 1236 Aug 03 (Annular)
- 1270 Mar 23 (Annular)
- 1331 Nov 30 (Total)
- 1476 Feb 25 (Total)
- 1489 Dec 22 (Annular)
- 1518 Jun 08 (Annular)
- 1551 Aug 31 (Total)
- 1827 Apr 26 (Annular)
- 2075 Jul 13 (Annular)
- 2195 Feb 10 (Annular)

=== Norilsk ===
- 1962 Feb 15 (Total)
- 25.07.2120(Annular)
- 2133 Jun 01 (Total)
- 17.09.2202(Annular)
- 19.03.2379(Total)
- 24.04.2582(Total)
- 22.06.2829(Annular)

=== Novosibirsk ===
- 2008 Aug 01 (Total)
- 2101 Feb 28 (Annular)
- 2276 Mar 16 (Annular)

=== Omsk ===
- 1874 Oct 10 (Annular)
- 1936 Jun 19 (Total)
- 2030 Jun 01 (Annular)
- 2120 Jul 25 (Annular)
- 2142 May 25 (Total)
- 2256 October 19 (Annular)
- 2287 Aug 10 (Annular)

=== Perm ===
- 1739 Aug 4 (Annular)
- 1887 Aug 19 (Total)
- 2061 Apr 20 (Total)
- 2141 Jan 8 (Annular)
- 2142 May 25 (Total)
- 2236 May 06 (Total)
- 2249 Mar 15 (Annular)
- 2256 October 19 (Annular)

=== Petropavlovsk-Kamchatsky ===
- 2066 Jun 22 (Annular)
- 2124 May 14 (Total)
- 2177 Jan 29 (Annular)
- 2231 Mar 04 (Annular)

=== Rostov-on-Don ===
- 1870 Dec 22 (Total)
- 1961 Feb 15 (Total)
- 2030 Jun 01 (Annular)
- 2061 Apr 20 (Total)
- 2195 Feb 10 (Annular)
- 2249 Mar 15 (Annular)

=== Samara ===
- 1842 Jul 08 (Total)
- 1961 Feb 15 (Total)
- 2061 Apr 20 (Total)
- 2187 Jul 06 (Total)
- 2214 Jul 08 (Total)
- 2249 Mar 15 (Annular)

=== Saratov ===
- 2061 Apr 20 (Total)
- 2126 Oct 16 (Total)
- 2187 Jul 6 (Total)
- 2195 Feb 10 (Annular)
- 2249 Mar 15 (Annular)
- 2296 Aug 29 (Annular)

=== St. Petersburg ===
- 1706 May 12 (Total)
- 2126 Oct 16 (Total)
- 2195 Feb 10 (Annular)
- 2296 Aug 29 (Annular)

=== Ufa ===
- 1641 Nov 03 (Total)
- 1842 Jul 08 (Total)
- 1961 Feb 15 (Total)
- 2061 Apr 20 (Total)
- 2141 Jan 8 (Annular)

=== Vladivostok ===
- 2063 Aug 24 (Total)
- 2118 Mar 22 (Annular)
- 2129 Aug 15 (Annular)

=== Volgograd ===
- 1666 Jul 02 (Hybrid)
- 1836 May 15 (Annular)
- 1961 Feb 15 (Total)
- 2030 Jun 01 (Annular)
- 2048 Jun 11 (Annular)
- 2061 Apr 20 (Total)
- 2195 Feb 10 (Annular)
- 2249 Mar 15 (Annular)
- 2287 Aug 10 (Annular)

=== Voronezh ===
- 1827 Apr 26 (Annular)
- 2048 Jun 11 (Annular)
- 2187 Jul 06 (Total)
- 2195 Feb 10 (Annular)
- 2236 May 06 (Total)

=== Yakutsk ===
- 1775 Aug 26 (Annular)
- 2057 Jul 1 (Annular)
- 2072 Sep 12 (Total)

=== Yekaterinburg ===
- 1874 Oct 10 (Annular)
- 1961 Feb 15 (Total)
- 2061 Apr 20 (Total)
- 2141 Jan 8 (Annular)
- 2142 May 25 (Total)
