= Solar eclipse of June 19, 1936 =

Total eclipse

- Total eclipse
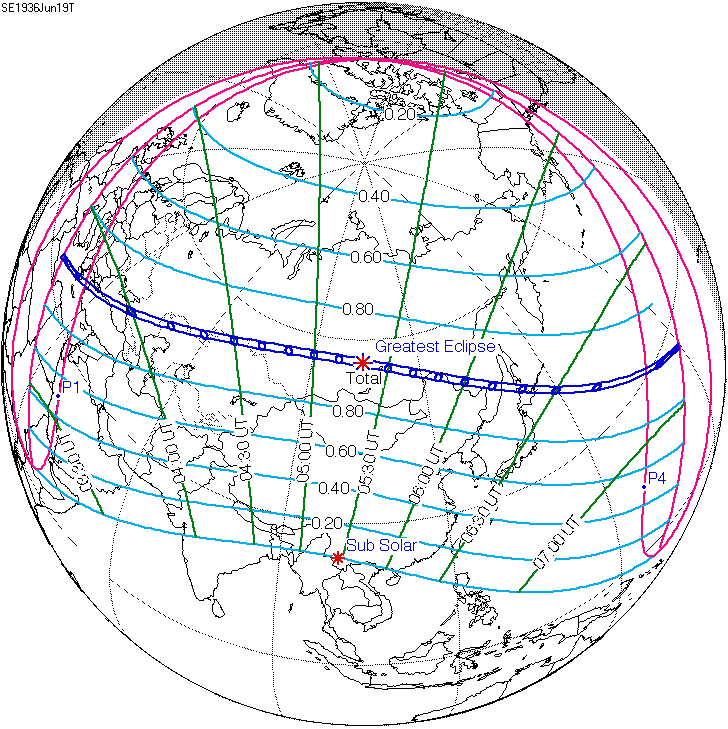
- Map
- Gamma: 0.5389
- Magnitude: 1.0329

Maximum eclipse
- Duration: 151 s (2 min 31 s)
- Coordinates: 56.1°N 104.7°E
- Max. width of band: 132 km (82 mi)

Times (UTC)
- Greatest eclipse: 5:20:31

References
- Saros: 126 (43 of 72)
- Catalog # (SE5000): 9367

A total solar eclipse occurred at the Moon's descending node of orbit on Friday, June 19, 1936, with a magnitude of 1.0329. A solar eclipse occurs when the Moon passes between Earth and the Sun, thereby totally or partly obscuring the image of the Sun for a viewer on Earth. A total solar eclipse occurs when the Moon's apparent diameter is larger than the Sun's, blocking all direct sunlight, turning day into darkness. Totality occurs in a narrow path across Earth's surface, with the partial solar eclipse visible over a surrounding region thousands of kilometres wide. Occurring about 3.3 days after perigee (on June 15, 1936, at 22:10 UTC), the Moon's apparent diameter was larger.

The path of totality crossed Greece, Turkey, USSR, China and the Japanese island of Hokkaido. The maximum eclipse was near Bratsk and lasted about 2.5 minutes. A partial eclipse was visible for parts of Europe, Northeast Africa, Asia, and northern North America.

The Evening Standard reported that the "preparations for to-day's eclipse have been going forward for the past two years", and that a British expedition led by amateur astronomer R. L. Waterfield saw "excellent atmospheric conditions" from its observation point on Cap Sunium. Similar observations were made by teams in Hokkaido, some hours later, allowing their observations of the Sun's corona to be compared "to find out whether any changes in shape or in detail of the corona have taken place in this interval". A Russian team in Krasnoyarsk reported successful observation from a high-altitude balloon, where scientists "hoped to make observations at a height of some 15 miles". There were also observers in the south of Greece, from Greece, Italy and Poland, the latter of which were "successful in obtaining cinematograph pictures of the eclipse". Several long prominences (more than a million miles long) were observed, as well as the planet Venus.

A United States expedition in Siberia conducted experiments on the ionosphere, with the Associated Press reporting that "indications that the earth's electrified roof, which, many miles above the surface of the globe, reflects back radio impulses, is formed mostly as a result of ultra-violet sun radiations appeared in preliminary results of the solar eclipse observations".

== Observations ==
=== Soviet Union ===
Except for the total solar eclipse of June 29, 1927, which was only visible from the sparsely populated Arctic Ocean coast, this was the first total solar eclipse visible within the Soviet Union since its founding (the previous one was in 1914 when it was still ruled by Russian Empire). 28 Soviet teams (including 17 astronomical observation teams and 11 geophysical observation teams) and 12 international teams from France, the United Kingdom, the United States, Italy, Czechoslovakia, Sweden, the Netherlands, China, Japan and Poland made observations in the Soviet Union. There were 370 astronomers in the teams. To offer better conditions for the 70 foreigners among them, the Central Committee of All-Union Communist Party (Bolsheviks) promoted a policy to reduce railway and water transportation fair by 50%. The Academy of Sciences of the Soviet Union established a special committee and made preparations for two years. The government raised 60,000, 365,000 and 400,000 roubles respectively in 1934, 1935 and 1936. Experts from the Leningrad Astronomical Institute manufactured 6 coronagraphs with a diameter of 100 mm and a focal length of 5 metres, distributed to Pulkovo Observatory, Sternberg Astronomical Institute, Moscow branch of the All-Union Astronomical and Geodetic Society, Institute of Astronomy of Kharkiv National University, V. P. Engel'gardt Astronomical Observatory and Ulugh Beg Astronomical Institute. Besides observations on the ground, balloons and aircraft were also used.

Among them, Pulkovo Observatory and its Simeiz branch (now Crimean Astrophysical Observatory) sent three teams. The first studied the chromosphere and solar prominences in Akbulak, Orenburg Oblast, led by Boris Gerasimovich, chairman of the Special Committee for Solar Eclipse Observation of the Academy of Sciences. The second went to Sara, Orenburg Oblast, led by Gavriil Adrianovich Tikhov. The third studied the corona in Omsk, led by Innokenty Andreevich Balanovsky. The team of the Sternberg Astronomical Institute went to the village of Bochkarev (Бочкарёв) in the suburbs of Kuybyshevka (now Belogorsk, Amur Oblast) to study the spectrum of the chromosphere and corona, the polarization of the corona and the light bending in gravitational fields proposed by the theory of relativity. The team of Kharkiv Observatory studied the luminosity, polarization and chromospheric spectrum of the corona in Belorechensk, Krasnodar Krai, led by Nikolai Barabashov. The team of the Georgian National Astrophysical Observatory studied coronal radiation. The team of the Moscow branch of the All-Union Astronomical and Geodetic Society made standard coronagraph observations and led amateur observations nationwide. The team of V. P. Engel'gardt Astronomical Observatory studied the visible spectrum of the corona with diffraction gratings and took images of the corona with standard coronagraphs in Kostanay Region in today's Kazakhstan.

An American team of 24 people led by Donald Howard Menzel went to Akbulak together with the Pulkovo Observatory team. A team of four astronomers of Arcetri Observatory, Italy led by Giorgio Abetti went to Sara together with another team of the Pulkovo Observatory.

=== Japan ===
Japan sent 20 astronomy observation teams and 18 geophysics observation teams to Hokkaido. In addition, teams from the United Kingdom, the United States, India, China, Czechoslovakia and Poland also went to Hokkaido. Some were successful and some were not. Interestingly, another total solar eclipse of August 9, 1896 was also visible in the coastal town Eshashi of Esashi District, which received many foreign scientists at that time. Therefore, despite the inconvenient transportation, Kwasan Observatory of Kyoto University and a Chinese team still selected it as the observation site.

=== China ===
In November 1934, astronomer Gao Lu organized the Chinese Solar Eclipse Observation Committee shortly after the establishment of the Purple Mountain Observatory, to prepare for observations of this eclipse in 1936, and the solar eclipse of September 21, 1941 (another total solar eclipse in 1943 was also visible in Northeast China, the Soviet Union and Japan, but there was no plans or actual activities of any kind of observations in China). The committee was inside the Institute of Astronomy, with Cai Yuanpei being the chairman, and Gao Lu the secretary-general. It asked for a fund of 30,000 from the government during the preparation, and received another 120,000 from the British, French and American portions of the Boxer Indemnities Committee. Although the path of totality of this eclipse passed through northeast China, it was relatively remote located on the Sino-Soviet border, and was already under control of Manchukuo, a Japanese puppet state. In the end, 2 teams were sent abroad. This was the first time that Chinese scientific observation teams made observations abroad.

One team consisted of only Zhang Yuzhe and Li Heng, going to Siberia, the Soviet Union. They initially planned to go to Orenburg Oblast with better weather conditions, but because the time was limited, they finally chose Khabarovsk. The two took a ship from Shanghai to Japan on May 31, then transferred to a train to Tsuruga and then transferred again a ship, arriving in Vladivostok on June 9. After staying there for 2 days, they took an international train and arrived in Khabarovsk on June 11. The goals include taking images of the corona, measuring the time of the eclipse, and comparing the darkness of the sky during totality with that of twilight. On the eclipse day, although it was clear in the morning and noon, the eclipse was clouded out in the afternoon, and it rained heavily in the evening. The observation was not successful.

Another team consisted of 6 people, with Yu Qingsong being the leader, and Chen Zungui, Zou Yixin, Wei Xueren, Shen Xuan and Feng Jian, going to Hokkaido, Japan. The team departed from Nanjing on June 3, arrived in Tokyo on the night of June 8, went to Hokkaido the next day, and arrived at the town of Esashi at noon on June 11. The town also received many foreign scientists during another total solar eclipse on August 9, 1896. The goals included taking images of the corona, taking films for public screening and gaining experience for observing the other total solar eclipse in 1941. There were clouds at first on eclipse day, but the sun came out of the clouds before the second contact. 3 ordinary corona images, 1 ultraviolet image and 3 sets of movies were taken.

In Nanjing, only a partial eclipse was visible. Although not worth observing compared with a total eclipse, Kao Ping-tse and Li Mingzhong who stayed in Nanjing still recorded the time of the solar eclipse, to check the accuracy of previous calculations.

== Eclipse details ==
Shown below are two tables displaying details about this particular solar eclipse. The first table outlines times at which the Moon's penumbra or umbra attains the specific parameter, and the second table describes various other parameters pertaining to this eclipse.

June 19, 1936 Solar Eclipse Times
Event	Time (UTC)
First Penumbral External Contact	1936 June 19 at 02:45:25.3 UTC
First Umbral External Contact	1936 June 19 at 03:49:28.3 UTC
First Central Line	1936 June 19 at 03:50:07.0 UTC
First Umbral Internal Contact	1936 June 19 at 03:50:45.8 UTC
Ecliptic Conjunction	1936 June 19 at 05:14:49.8 UTC
Equatorial Conjunction	1936 June 19 at 05:15:50.0 UTC
Greatest Duration	1936 June 19 at 05:17:59.5 UTC
Greatest Eclipse	1936 June 19 at 05:20:31.1 UTC
Last Umbral Internal Contact	1936 June 19 at 06:50:22.6 UTC
Last Central Line	1936 June 19 at 06:50:58.9 UTC
Last Umbral External Contact	1936 June 19 at 06:51:35.0 UTC
Last Penumbral External Contact	1936 June 19 at 07:55:44.4 UTC

June 19, 1936 Solar Eclipse Parameters
Parameter	Value
Eclipse Magnitude	1.03291
Eclipse Obscuration	1.06691
Gamma	0.53889
Sun Right Ascension	05h50m06.8s
Sun Declination	+23°25'41.1"
Sun Semi-Diameter	15'44.3"
Sun Equatorial Horizontal Parallax	08.7"
Moon Right Ascension	05h50m17.9s
Moon Declination	+23°57'12.9"
Moon Semi-Diameter	16'02.1"
Moon Equatorial Horizontal Parallax	0°58'50.8"
ΔT	23.8 s

== Eclipse season ==
This eclipse is part of an eclipse season, a period, roughly every six months, when eclipses occur. Only two (or occasionally three) eclipse seasons occur each year, and each season lasts about 35 days and repeats just short of six months (173 days) later; thus two full eclipse seasons always occur each year. Either two or three eclipses happen each eclipse season. In the sequence below, each eclipse is separated by a fortnight.

Eclipse season of June–July 1936
June 19 Descending node (new moon)	July 4 Ascending node (full moon)
Total solar eclipse Solar Saros 126	Partial lunar eclipse Lunar Saros 138

== Related eclipses ==
=== Eclipses in 1936 ===
- A total lunar eclipse on January 8.
- A total solar eclipse on June 19.
- A partial lunar eclipse on July 4.
- An annular solar eclipse on December 13.
- A penumbral lunar eclipse on December 28.

=== Metonic ===
- Preceded by: Solar eclipse of August 31, 1932
- Followed by: Solar eclipse of April 7, 1940

=== Tzolkinex ===
- Preceded by: Solar eclipse of May 9, 1929
- Followed by: Solar eclipse of August 1, 1943

=== Half-Saros ===
- Preceded by: Lunar eclipse of June 15, 1927
- Followed by: Lunar eclipse of June 25, 1945

=== Tritos ===
- Preceded by: Solar eclipse of July 20, 1925
- Followed by: Solar eclipse of May 20, 1947

=== Solar Saros 126 ===
- Preceded by: Solar eclipse of June 8, 1918
- Followed by: Solar eclipse of June 30, 1954

=== Inex ===
- Preceded by: Solar eclipse of July 10, 1907
- Followed by: Solar eclipse of May 30, 1965

=== Triad ===
- Preceded by: Solar eclipse of August 18, 1849
- Followed by: Solar eclipse of April 20, 2023

=== Solar eclipses of 1935–1938 ===
This eclipse is a member of a semester series. An eclipse in a semester series of solar eclipses repeats approximately every 177 days and 4 hours (a semester) at alternating nodes of the Moon's orbit.

The partial solar eclipses on February 3, 1935 and July 30, 1935 occur in the previous lunar year eclipse set.

Solar eclipse series sets from 1935 to 1938
Ascending node			Descending node		
Saros	Map	Gamma	Saros	Map	Gamma
111	January 5, 1935 Partial	−1.5381	116	June 30, 1935 Partial	1.3623
121	December 25, 1935 Annular	−0.9228	126	June 19, 1936 Total	0.5389
131	December 13, 1936 Annular	−0.2493	136 Totality in Kanton Island, Kiribati	June 8, 1937 Total	−0.2253
141	December 2, 1937 Annular	0.4389	146	May 29, 1938 Total	−0.9607
151	November 21, 1938 Partial	1.1077			

=== Saros 126 ===
This eclipse is a part of Saros series 126, repeating every 18 years, 11 days, and containing 72 events. The series started with a partial solar eclipse on March 10, 1179. It contains annular eclipses from June 4, 1323 through April 4, 1810; hybrid eclipses from April 14, 1828 through May 6, 1864; and total eclipses from May 17, 1882 through August 23, 2044. The series ends at member 72 as a partial eclipse on May 3, 2459. Its eclipses are tabulated in three columns; every third eclipse in the same column is one exeligmos apart, so they all cast shadows over approximately the same parts of the Earth.

The longest duration of annularity was produced by member 11 at 6 minutes, 30 seconds on June 26, 1359, and the longest duration of totality was produced by member 45 at 2 minutes, 36 seconds on July 10, 1972. All eclipses in this series occur at the Moon’s descending node of orbit.

Series members 36–57 occur between 1801 and 2200:
36	37	38
April 4, 1810	April 14, 1828	April 25, 1846
39	40	41
May 6, 1864	May 17, 1882	May 28, 1900
42	43	44
June 8, 1918	June 19, 1936	June 30, 1954
45	46	47
July 10, 1972	July 22, 1990	August 1, 2008
48	49	50
August 12, 2026	August 23, 2044	September 3, 2062
51	52	53
September 13, 2080	September 25, 2098	October 6, 2116
54	55	56
October 17, 2134	October 28, 2152	November 8, 2170
57
November 18, 2188

=== Metonic series ===
The metonic series repeats eclipses every 19 years (6939.69 days), lasting about 5 cycles. Eclipses occur in nearly the same calendar date. In addition, the octon subseries repeats 1/5 of that or every 3.8 years (1387.94 days). All eclipses in this table occur at the Moon's descending node.

22 eclipse events between April 8, 1902 and August 31, 1989
April 7–8	January 24–25	November 12	August 31–September 1	June 19–20
108	110	112	114	116
April 8, 1902			August 31, 1913	June 19, 1917
118	120	122	124	126
April 8, 1921	January 24, 1925	November 12, 1928	August 31, 1932	June 19, 1936
128	130	132	134	136
April 7, 1940	January 25, 1944	November 12, 1947	September 1, 1951	June 20, 1955
138	140	142	144	146
April 8, 1959	January 25, 1963	November 12, 1966	August 31, 1970	June 20, 1974
148	150	152	154	
April 7, 1978	January 25, 1982	November 12, 1985	August 31, 1989	

=== Tritos series ===
This eclipse is a part of a tritos cycle, repeating at alternating nodes every 135 synodic months (≈ 3986.63 days, or 11 years minus 1 month). Their appearance and longitude are irregular due to a lack of synchronization with the anomalistic month (period of perigee), but groupings of 3 tritos cycles (≈ 33 years minus 3 months) come close (≈ 434.044 anomalistic months), so eclipses are similar in these groupings.

Series members between 1801 and 2200
June 26, 1805 (Saros 114)	May 27, 1816 (Saros 115)	April 26, 1827 (Saros 116)	March 25, 1838 (Saros 117)	February 23, 1849 (Saros 118)
January 23, 1860 (Saros 119)	December 22, 1870 (Saros 120)	November 21, 1881 (Saros 121)	October 20, 1892 (Saros 122)	September 21, 1903 (Saros 123)
August 21, 1914 (Saros 124)	July 20, 1925 (Saros 125)	June 19, 1936 (Saros 126)	May 20, 1947 (Saros 127)	April 19, 1958 (Saros 128)
March 18, 1969 (Saros 129)	February 16, 1980 (Saros 130)	January 15, 1991 (Saros 131)	December 14, 2001 (Saros 132)	November 13, 2012 (Saros 133)
October 14, 2023 (Saros 134)	September 12, 2034 (Saros 135)	August 12, 2045 (Saros 136)	July 12, 2056 (Saros 137)	June 11, 2067 (Saros 138)
May 11, 2078 (Saros 139)	April 10, 2089 (Saros 140)	March 10, 2100 (Saros 141)	February 8, 2111 (Saros 142)	January 8, 2122 (Saros 143)
December 7, 2132 (Saros 144)	November 7, 2143 (Saros 145)	October 7, 2154 (Saros 146)	September 5, 2165 (Saros 147)	August 4, 2176 (Saros 148)
July 6, 2187 (Saros 149)	June 4, 2198 (Saros 150)			

=== Inex series ===
This eclipse is a part of the long period inex cycle, repeating at alternating nodes, every 358 synodic months (≈ 10,571.95 days, or 29 years minus 20 days). Their appearance and longitude are irregular due to a lack of synchronization with the anomalistic month (period of perigee). However, groupings of 3 inex cycles (≈ 87 years minus 2 months) comes close (≈ 1,151.02 anomalistic months), so eclipses are similar in these groupings.

Series members between 1801 and 2200
September 7, 1820 (Saros 122)	August 18, 1849 (Saros 123)	July 29, 1878 (Saros 124)
July 10, 1907 (Saros 125)	June 19, 1936 (Saros 126)	May 30, 1965 (Saros 127)
May 10, 1994 (Saros 128)	April 20, 2023 (Saros 129)	March 30, 2052 (Saros 130)
March 10, 2081 (Saros 131)	February 18, 2110 (Saros 132)	January 30, 2139 (Saros 133)
January 10, 2168 (Saros 134)	December 19, 2196 (Saros 135)	
