= Solar eclipse of August 1, 1943 =

20th-century annular solar eclipse

- Annular eclipse
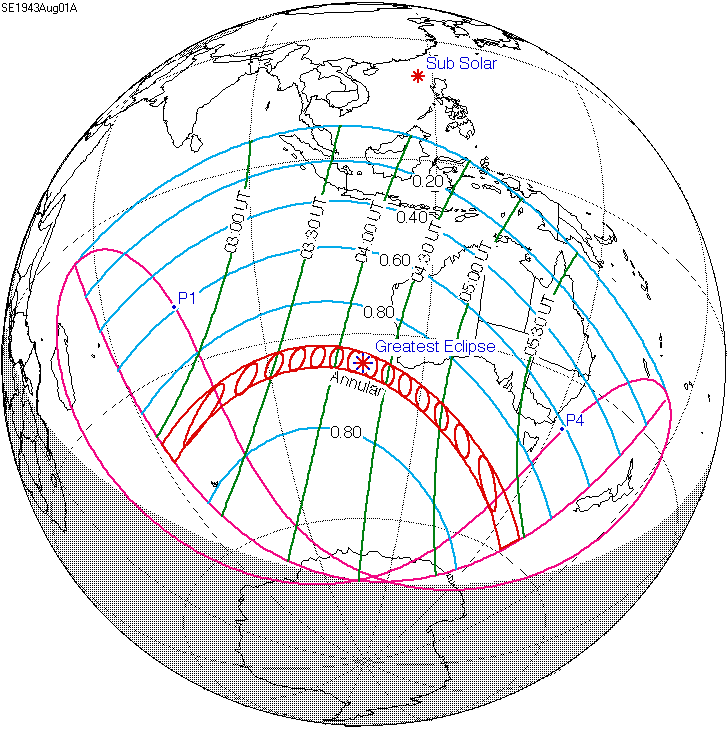
- Map
- Gamma: −0.8041
- Magnitude: 0.9409

Maximum eclipse
- Duration: 419 s (6 min 59 s)
- Coordinates: 34.8°S 108.6°E
- Max. width of band: 367 km (228 mi)

Times (UTC)
- Greatest eclipse: 4:16:13

References
- Saros: 125 (50 of 73)
- Catalog # (SE5000): 9383

An annular solar eclipse occurred at the Moon's ascending node of orbit on Sunday, August 1, 1943, with a magnitude of 0.9409. A solar eclipse occurs when the Moon passes between Earth and the Sun, thereby totally or partly obscuring the image of the Sun for a viewer on Earth. An annular solar eclipse occurs when the Moon's apparent diameter is smaller than the Sun's, blocking most of the Sun's light and causing the Sun to look like an annulus (ring). An annular eclipse appears as a partial eclipse over a region of the Earth thousands of kilometres wide. Occurring about 25 minutes before apogee (on August 1, 1943, at 4:40 UTC), the Moon's apparent diameter was near its minimum. Apogee did occur as the eclipse was just before its greatest eclipse.

Annularity was visible in the southern Indian Ocean, with the only land being Île Amsterdam in French Madagascar (now belonging to French Southern and Antarctic Lands). A partial solar eclipse was visible from Australia, Indonesia, Malaysia, eastern Madagascar, Antarctica's Wilkes Land.

== Eclipse details ==
Shown below are two tables displaying details about this particular solar eclipse. The first table outlines times at which the Moon's penumbra or umbra attains the specific parameter, and the second table describes various other parameters pertaining to this eclipse.

August 1, 1943 Solar Eclipse Times
Event	Time (UTC)
First Penumbral External Contact	1943 August 1 at 01:36:43.5 UTC
First Umbral External Contact	1943 August 1 at 03:02:00.9 UTC
First Central Line	1943 August 1 at 03:05:56.2 UTC
First Umbral Internal Contact	1943 August 1 at 03:10:00.5 UTC
Ecliptic Conjunction	1943 August 1 at 04:06:41.0 UTC
Greatest Duration	1943 August 1 at 04:13:30.8 UTC
Greatest Eclipse	1943 August 1 at 04:16:13.0 UTC
Equatorial Conjunction	1943 August 1 at 04:31:47.4 UTC
Last Umbral Internal Contact	1943 August 1 at 05:22:14.2 UTC
Last Central Line	1943 August 1 at 05:26:18.8 UTC
Last Umbral External Contact	1943 August 1 at 05:30:14.3 UTC
Last Penumbral External Contact	1943 August 1 at 06:55:35.4 UTC

August 1, 1943 Solar Eclipse Parameters
Parameter	Value
Eclipse Magnitude	0.94090
Eclipse Obscuration	0.88530
Gamma	−0.80410
Sun Right Ascension	08h41m53.3s
Sun Declination	+18°15'27.8"
Sun Semi-Diameter	15'45.5"
Sun Equatorial Horizontal Parallax	08.7"
Moon Right Ascension	08h41m24.1s
Moon Declination	+17°32'46.0"
Moon Semi-Diameter	14'41.9"
Moon Equatorial Horizontal Parallax	0°53'56.6"
ΔT	26.0 s

== Eclipse season ==
This eclipse is part of an eclipse season, a period, roughly every six months, when eclipses occur. Only two (or occasionally three) eclipse seasons occur each year, and each season lasts about 35 days and repeats just short of six months (173 days) later; thus two full eclipse seasons always occur each year. Either two or three eclipses happen each eclipse season. In the sequence below, each eclipse is separated by a fortnight.

Eclipse season of August 1943
August 1 Ascending node (new moon)	August 15 Descending node (full moon)
Annular solar eclipse Solar Saros 125	Partial lunar eclipse Lunar Saros 137

== Related eclipses ==
=== Eclipses in 1943 ===
- A total solar eclipse on February 4.
- A partial lunar eclipse on February 20.
- An annular solar eclipse on August 1.
- A partial lunar eclipse on August 15.

=== Metonic ===
- Preceded by: Solar eclipse of October 12, 1939
- Followed by: Solar eclipse of May 20, 1947

=== Tzolkinex ===
- Preceded by: Solar eclipse of June 19, 1936
- Followed by: Solar eclipse of September 12, 1950

=== Half-Saros ===
- Preceded by: Lunar eclipse of July 26, 1934
- Followed by: Lunar eclipse of August 5, 1952

=== Tritos ===
- Preceded by: Solar eclipse of August 31, 1932
- Followed by: Solar eclipse of June 30, 1954

=== Solar Saros 125 ===
- Preceded by: Solar eclipse of July 20, 1925
- Followed by: Solar eclipse of August 11, 1961

=== Inex ===
- Preceded by: Solar eclipse of August 21, 1914
- Followed by: Solar eclipse of July 10, 1972

=== Triad ===
- Preceded by: Solar eclipse of September 29, 1856
- Followed by: Solar eclipse of June 1, 2030

=== Solar eclipses of 1942–1946 ===
This eclipse is a member of a semester series. An eclipse in a semester series of solar eclipses repeats approximately every 177 days and 4 hours (a semester) at alternating nodes of the Moon's orbit.

The partial solar eclipses on March 16, 1942 and September 10, 1942 occur in the previous lunar year eclipse set, and the partial solar eclipses on May 30, 1946 and November 23, 1946 occur in the next lunar year eclipse set.

Solar eclipse series sets from 1942 to 1946
Ascending node			Descending node		
Saros	Map	Gamma	Saros	Map	Gamma
115	August 12, 1942 Partial	−1.5244	120	February 4, 1943 Total	0.8734
125	August 1, 1943 Annular	−0.8041	130	January 25, 1944 Total	0.2025
135	July 20, 1944 Annular	−0.0314	140	January 14, 1945 Annular	−0.4937
145	July 9, 1945 Total	0.7356	150	January 3, 1946 Partial	−1.2392
155	June 29, 1946 Partial	1.4361			

=== Saros 125 ===
This eclipse is a part of Saros series 125, repeating every 18 years, 11 days, and containing 73 events. The series started with a partial solar eclipse on February 4, 1060. It contains total eclipses from June 13, 1276 through July 16, 1330; hybrid eclipses on July 26, 1348 and August 7, 1366; and annular eclipses from August 17, 1384 through August 22, 1979. The series ends at member 73 as a partial eclipse on April 9, 2358. Its eclipses are tabulated in three columns; every third eclipse in the same column is one exeligmos apart, so they all cast shadows over approximately the same parts of the Earth.

The longest duration of totality was produced by member 14 at 1 minutes, 11 seconds on June 25, 1294, and the longest duration of annularity was produced by member 48 at 7 minutes, 23 seconds on July 10, 1907. All eclipses in this series occur at the Moon’s ascending node of orbit.

Series members 43–64 occur between 1801 and 2200:
43	44	45
May 16, 1817	May 27, 1835	June 6, 1853
46	47	48
June 18, 1871	June 28, 1889	July 10, 1907
49	50	51
July 20, 1925	August 1, 1943	August 11, 1961
52	53	54
August 22, 1979	September 2, 1997	September 13, 2015
55	56	57
September 23, 2033	October 4, 2051	October 15, 2069
58	59	60
October 26, 2087	November 6, 2105	November 18, 2123
61	62	63
November 28, 2141	December 9, 2159	December 20, 2177
64
December 31, 2195

=== Metonic series ===
The metonic series repeats eclipses every 19 years (6939.69 days), lasting about 5 cycles. Eclipses occur in nearly the same calendar date. In addition, the octon subseries repeats 1/5 of that or every 3.8 years (1387.94 days). All eclipses in this table occur at the Moon's ascending node.

22 eclipse events between December 24, 1916 and July 31, 2000
December 24–25	October 12	July 31–August 1	May 19–20	March 7
111	113	115	117	119
December 24, 1916		July 31, 1924	May 19, 1928	March 7, 1932
121	123	125	127	129
December 25, 1935	October 12, 1939	August 1, 1943	May 20, 1947	March 7, 1951
131	133	135	137	139
December 25, 1954	October 12, 1958	July 31, 1962	May 20, 1966	March 7, 1970
141	143	145	147	149
December 24, 1973	October 12, 1977	July 31, 1981	May 19, 1985	March 7, 1989
151	153	155		
December 24, 1992	October 12, 1996	July 31, 2000		

=== Tritos series ===
This eclipse is a part of a tritos cycle, repeating at alternating nodes every 135 synodic months (≈ 3986.63 days, or 11 years minus 1 month). Their appearance and longitude are irregular due to a lack of synchronization with the anomalistic month (period of perigee), but groupings of 3 tritos cycles (≈ 33 years minus 3 months) come close (≈ 434.044 anomalistic months), so eclipses are similar in these groupings.

Series members between 1801 and 2200
September 8, 1801 (Saros 112)	August 7, 1812 (Saros 113)	July 8, 1823 (Saros 114)	June 7, 1834 (Saros 115)	May 6, 1845 (Saros 116)
April 5, 1856 (Saros 117)	March 6, 1867 (Saros 118)	February 2, 1878 (Saros 119)	January 1, 1889 (Saros 120)	December 3, 1899 (Saros 121)
November 2, 1910 (Saros 122)	October 1, 1921 (Saros 123)	August 31, 1932 (Saros 124)	August 1, 1943 (Saros 125)	June 30, 1954 (Saros 126)
May 30, 1965 (Saros 127)	April 29, 1976 (Saros 128)	March 29, 1987 (Saros 129)	February 26, 1998 (Saros 130)	January 26, 2009 (Saros 131)
December 26, 2019 (Saros 132)	November 25, 2030 (Saros 133)	October 25, 2041 (Saros 134)	September 22, 2052 (Saros 135)	August 24, 2063 (Saros 136)
July 24, 2074 (Saros 137)	June 22, 2085 (Saros 138)	May 22, 2096 (Saros 139)	April 23, 2107 (Saros 140)	March 22, 2118 (Saros 141)
February 18, 2129 (Saros 142)	January 20, 2140 (Saros 143)	December 19, 2150 (Saros 144)	November 17, 2161 (Saros 145)	October 17, 2172 (Saros 146)
September 16, 2183 (Saros 147)	August 16, 2194 (Saros 148)			

=== Inex series ===
This eclipse is a part of the long period inex cycle, repeating at alternating nodes, every 358 synodic months (≈ 10,571.95 days, or 29 years minus 20 days). Their appearance and longitude are irregular due to a lack of synchronization with the anomalistic month (period of perigee). However, groupings of 3 inex cycles (≈ 87 years minus 2 months) comes close (≈ 1,151.02 anomalistic months), so eclipses are similar in these groupings.

Series members between 1801 and 2200
October 20, 1827 (Saros 121)	September 29, 1856 (Saros 122)	September 8, 1885 (Saros 123)
August 21, 1914 (Saros 124)	August 1, 1943 (Saros 125)	July 10, 1972 (Saros 126)
June 21, 2001 (Saros 127)	June 1, 2030 (Saros 128)	May 11, 2059 (Saros 129)
April 21, 2088 (Saros 130)	April 2, 2117 (Saros 131)	March 12, 2146 (Saros 132)
February 21, 2175 (Saros 133)		
