= Solar eclipse of June 30, 1954 =

Total eclipse

- Total eclipse
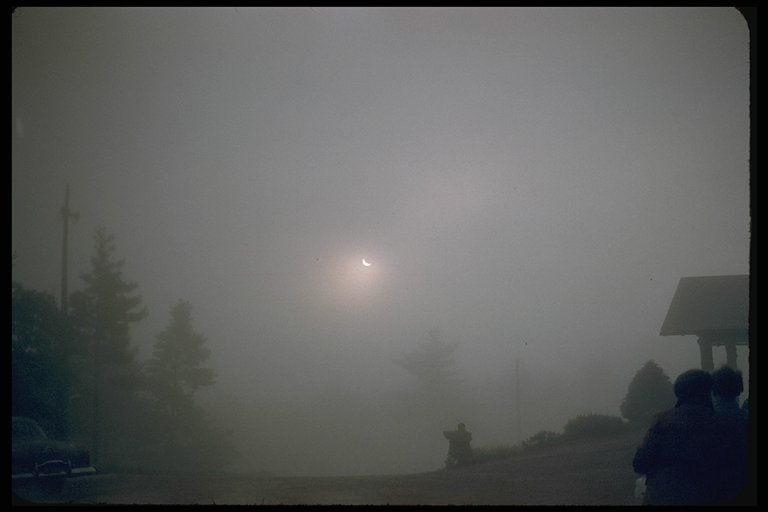
- From Copper Harbor, Michigan, shortly before totality

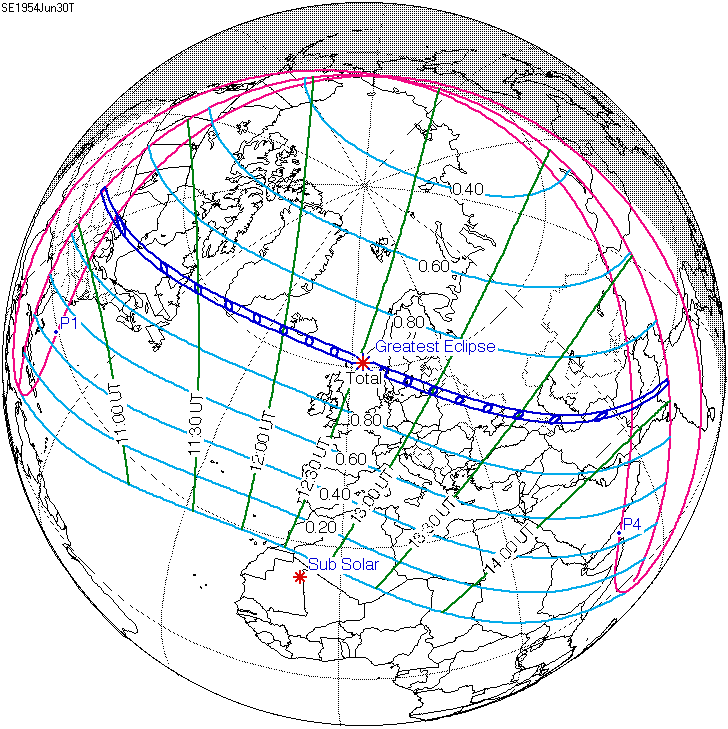
- Map
- Gamma: 0.6135
- Magnitude: 1.0357

Maximum eclipse
- Duration: 155 s (2 min 35 s)
- Coordinates: 60.5°N 4.2°E
- Max. width of band: 153 km (95 mi)

Times (UTC)
- Greatest eclipse: 12:32:38

References
- Saros: 126 (44 of 72)
- Catalog # (SE5000): 9408

A total solar eclipse occurred at the Moon's descending node of orbit on Wednesday, June 30, 1954, with a magnitude of 1.0357. A solar eclipse occurs when the Moon passes between Earth and the Sun, thereby totally or partly obscuring the image of the Sun for a viewer on Earth. A total solar eclipse occurs when the Moon's apparent diameter is larger than the Sun's, blocking all direct sunlight, turning day into darkness. Totality occurs in a narrow path across Earth's surface, with the partial solar eclipse visible over a surrounding region thousands of kilometres wide. Occurring about 3.1 days after perigee (on June 27, 1954, at 11:10 UTC), the Moon's apparent diameter was larger. It was the last total solar eclipse visible in Iceland until the eclipse of August 12, 2026.

== Visibility ==
Totality began at sunrise over the United States over Nebraska, South Dakota, Minnesota, and Wisconsin, and crossed into Canada, across southern Greenland, Iceland and Faroe Islands, then into Europe, across Norway, Sweden, and eastern Europe. It ended before sunset over Iran, Afghanistan, Pakistan, and ending in northwestern India. The southwestern part of Vilnius, northeastern part of Kyiv, and southwestern part of Baku were covered by the path of totality.

The northeastern part of Mount Elbrus, the highest mountain in Europe, also lay in the path of totality.

The eclipse was mostly seen on June 30, 1954, except for northeastern Soviet Union, where a partial eclipse started on June 30, passing midnight and ended on July 1 due to the midnight sun.

A partial eclipse was visible for parts of eastern North America, Europe, North Africa, West Asia, Central Asia, and South Asia.

== Observation ==
Within the United Kingdom, the path of totality only covered Shetland Islands in northern Scotland. However, the area was mostly clouded out during the eclipse, and there was even light rain in some places, so observation was not successful. About 400 scientists from around the world traveled to Sweden to observe the total eclipse. The Astronomy Department of Kiev State University, Soviet Union made observation in Kyiv and took ideal images of solar corona. The Sternberg Astronomical Institute made observation in Nevinnomyssk, Stavropol Krai.

In Wakefield, Massachusetts, U.S., the eclipse was blocked by heavy cloud cover from 6 to 8 a.m. local time, The Wakefield Daily Item reported.

== Eclipse details ==
Shown below are two tables displaying details about this particular solar eclipse. The first table outlines times at which the Moon's penumbra or umbra attains the specific parameter, and the second table describes various other parameters pertaining to this eclipse.

June 30, 1954 Solar Eclipse Times
Event	Time (UTC)
First Penumbral External Contact	1954 June 30 at 10:01:27.0 UTC
First Umbral External Contact	1954 June 30 at 11:07:26.5 UTC
First Central Line	1954 June 30 at 11:08:15.4 UTC
First Umbral Internal Contact	1954 June 30 at 11:09:04.5 UTC
Equatorial Conjunction	1954 June 30 at 12:22:04.8 UTC
Ecliptic Conjunction	1954 June 30 at 12:26:11.3 UTC
Greatest Duration	1954 June 30 at 12:29:47.2 UTC
Greatest Eclipse	1954 June 30 at 12:32:37.5 UTC
Last Umbral Internal Contact	1954 June 30 at 13:56:20.5 UTC
Last Central Line	1954 June 30 at 13:57:07.0 UTC
Last Umbral External Contact	1954 June 30 at 13:57:53.4 UTC
Last Penumbral External Contact	1954 June 30 at 15:03:57.8 UTC

June 30, 1954 Solar Eclipse Parameters
Parameter	Value
Eclipse Magnitude	1.03574
Eclipse Obscuration	1.07276
Gamma	0.61345
Sun Right Ascension	06h35m35.5s
Sun Declination	+23°11'36.6"
Sun Semi-Diameter	15'43.9"
Sun Equatorial Horizontal Parallax	08.6"
Moon Right Ascension	06h36m00.6s
Moon Declination	+23°47'16.6"
Moon Semi-Diameter	16'05.1"
Moon Equatorial Horizontal Parallax	0°59'02.1"
ΔT	30.9 s

== Eclipse season ==
This eclipse is part of an eclipse season, a period, roughly every six months, when eclipses occur. Only two (or occasionally three) eclipse seasons occur each year, and each season lasts about 35 days and repeats just short of six months (173 days) later; thus two full eclipse seasons always occur each year. Either two or three eclipses happen each eclipse season. In the sequence below, each eclipse is separated by a fortnight.

Eclipse season of June–July 1954
June 30 Descending node (new moon)	July 16 Ascending node (full moon)
Total solar eclipse Solar Saros 126	Partial lunar eclipse Lunar Saros 138

== Related eclipses ==
=== Eclipses in 1954 ===
- An annular solar eclipse on January 5.
- A total lunar eclipse on January 19.
- A total solar eclipse on June 30.
- A partial lunar eclipse on July 16.
- An annular solar eclipse on December 25.

=== Metonic ===
- Preceded by: Solar eclipse of September 12, 1950
- Followed by: Solar eclipse of April 19, 1958

=== Tzolkinex ===
- Preceded by: Solar eclipse of May 20, 1947
- Followed by: Solar eclipse of August 11, 1961

=== Half-Saros ===
- Preceded by: Lunar eclipse of June 25, 1945
- Followed by: Lunar eclipse of July 6, 1963

=== Tritos ===
- Preceded by: Solar eclipse of August 1, 1943
- Followed by: Solar eclipse of May 30, 1965

=== Solar Saros 126 ===
- Preceded by: Solar eclipse of June 19, 1936
- Followed by: Solar eclipse of July 10, 1972

=== Inex ===
- Preceded by: Solar eclipse of July 20, 1925
- Followed by: Solar eclipse of June 11, 1983

=== Triad ===
- Preceded by: Solar eclipse of August 29, 1867
- Followed by: Solar eclipse of April 30, 2041

=== Solar eclipses of 1953–1956 ===
This eclipse is a member of a semester series. An eclipse in a semester series of solar eclipses repeats approximately every 177 days and 4 hours (a semester) at alternating nodes of the Moon's orbit.

The partial solar eclipses on February 14, 1953 and August 9, 1953 occur in the previous lunar year eclipse set.

Solar eclipse series sets from 1953 to 1956
Descending node			Ascending node		
Saros	Map	Gamma	Saros	Map	Gamma
116	July 11, 1953 Partial	1.4388	121	January 5, 1954 Annular	−0.9296
126	June 30, 1954 Total	0.6135	131	December 25, 1954 Annular	−0.2576
136	June 20, 1955 Total	−0.1528	141	December 14, 1955 Annular	0.4266
146	June 8, 1956 Total	−0.8934	151	December 2, 1956 Partial	1.0923

=== Saros 126 ===
This eclipse is a part of Saros series 126, repeating every 18 years, 11 days, and containing 72 events. The series started with a partial solar eclipse on March 10, 1179. It contains annular eclipses from June 4, 1323 through April 4, 1810; hybrid eclipses from April 14, 1828 through May 6, 1864; and total eclipses from May 17, 1882 through August 23, 2044. The series ends at member 72 as a partial eclipse on May 3, 2459. Its eclipses are tabulated in three columns; every third eclipse in the same column is one exeligmos apart, so they all cast shadows over approximately the same parts of the Earth.

The longest duration of annularity was produced by member 11 at 6 minutes, 30 seconds on June 26, 1359, and the longest duration of totality was produced by member 45 at 2 minutes, 36 seconds on July 10, 1972. All eclipses in this series occur at the Moon’s descending node of orbit.

Series members 36–57 occur between 1801 and 2200:
36	37	38
April 4, 1810	April 14, 1828	April 25, 1846
39	40	41
May 6, 1864	May 17, 1882	May 28, 1900
42	43	44
June 8, 1918	June 19, 1936	June 30, 1954
45	46	47
July 10, 1972	July 22, 1990	August 1, 2008
48	49	50
August 12, 2026	August 23, 2044	September 3, 2062
51	52	53
September 13, 2080	September 25, 2098	October 6, 2116
54	55	56
October 17, 2134	October 28, 2152	November 8, 2170
57
November 18, 2188

=== Metonic series ===
The metonic series repeats eclipses every 19 years (6939.69 days), lasting about 5 cycles. Eclipses occur in nearly the same calendar date. In addition, the octon subseries repeats 1/5 of that or every 3.8 years (1387.94 days). All eclipses in this table occur at the Moon's descending node.

22 eclipse events between September 12, 1931 and July 1, 2011
September 11–12	June 30–July 1	April 17–19	February 4–5	November 22–23
114	116	118	120	122
September 12, 1931	June 30, 1935	April 19, 1939	February 4, 1943	November 23, 1946
124	126	128	130	132
September 12, 1950	June 30, 1954	April 19, 1958	February 5, 1962	November 23, 1965
134	136	138	140	142
September 11, 1969	June 30, 1973	April 18, 1977	February 4, 1981	November 22, 1984
144	146	148	150	152
September 11, 1988	June 30, 1992	April 17, 1996	February 5, 2000	November 23, 2003
154	156			
September 11, 2007	July 1, 2011			

=== Tritos series ===
This eclipse is a part of a tritos cycle, repeating at alternating nodes every 135 synodic months (≈ 3986.63 days, or 11 years minus 1 month). Their appearance and longitude are irregular due to a lack of synchronization with the anomalistic month (period of perigee), but groupings of 3 tritos cycles (≈ 33 years minus 3 months) come close (≈ 434.044 anomalistic months), so eclipses are similar in these groupings.

Series members between 1801 and 2200
September 8, 1801 (Saros 112)	August 7, 1812 (Saros 113)	July 8, 1823 (Saros 114)	June 7, 1834 (Saros 115)	May 6, 1845 (Saros 116)
April 5, 1856 (Saros 117)	March 6, 1867 (Saros 118)	February 2, 1878 (Saros 119)	January 1, 1889 (Saros 120)	December 3, 1899 (Saros 121)
November 2, 1910 (Saros 122)	October 1, 1921 (Saros 123)	August 31, 1932 (Saros 124)	August 1, 1943 (Saros 125)	June 30, 1954 (Saros 126)
May 30, 1965 (Saros 127)	April 29, 1976 (Saros 128)	March 29, 1987 (Saros 129)	February 26, 1998 (Saros 130)	January 26, 2009 (Saros 131)
December 26, 2019 (Saros 132)	November 25, 2030 (Saros 133)	October 25, 2041 (Saros 134)	September 22, 2052 (Saros 135)	August 24, 2063 (Saros 136)
July 24, 2074 (Saros 137)	June 22, 2085 (Saros 138)	May 22, 2096 (Saros 139)	April 23, 2107 (Saros 140)	March 22, 2118 (Saros 141)
February 18, 2129 (Saros 142)	January 20, 2140 (Saros 143)	December 19, 2150 (Saros 144)	November 17, 2161 (Saros 145)	October 17, 2172 (Saros 146)
September 16, 2183 (Saros 147)	August 16, 2194 (Saros 148)			

=== Inex series ===
This eclipse is a part of the long period inex cycle, repeating at alternating nodes, every 358 synodic months (≈ 10,571.95 days, or 29 years minus 20 days). Their appearance and longitude are irregular due to a lack of synchronization with the anomalistic month (period of perigee). However, groupings of 3 inex cycles (≈ 87 years minus 2 months) comes close (≈ 1,151.02 anomalistic months), so eclipses are similar in these groupings.

Series members between 1801 and 2200
October 9, 1809 (Saros 121)	September 18, 1838 (Saros 122)	August 29, 1867 (Saros 123)
August 9, 1896 (Saros 124)	July 20, 1925 (Saros 125)	June 30, 1954 (Saros 126)
June 11, 1983 (Saros 127)	May 20, 2012 (Saros 128)	April 30, 2041 (Saros 129)
April 11, 2070 (Saros 130)	March 21, 2099 (Saros 131)	March 1, 2128 (Saros 132)
February 9, 2157 (Saros 133)	January 20, 2186 (Saros 134)	

== See also ==
- List of solar eclipses visible from Russia
- List of solar eclipses visible from the United Kingdom
- Allais effect
