= Solar eclipse of September 5, 1793 =

Annular solar eclipse

- Annular eclipse
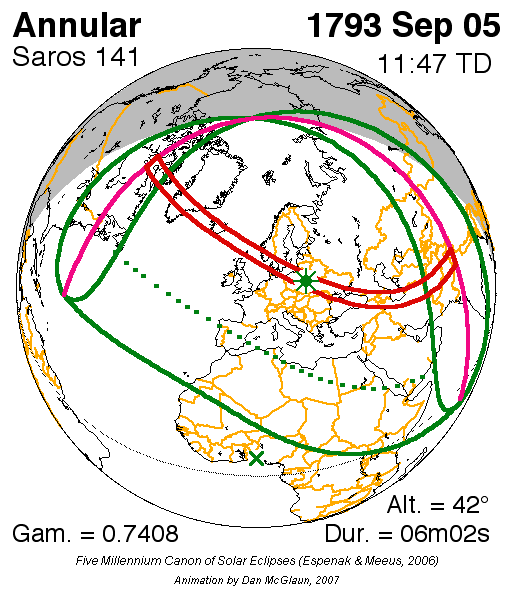
- Map
- Gamma: 0.7407
- Magnitude: 0.937

Maximum eclipse
- Duration: 362 s (6 min 2 s)
- Coordinates: 51.7°N 23°E
- Max. width of band: 347 km (216 mi)

Times (UTC)
- Greatest eclipse: 11:47:24

References
- Saros: 141 (11 of 70)
- Catalog # (SE5000): 9023

An annular solar eclipse occurred on September 5, 1793. A solar eclipse occurs when the Moon passes between the Earth and the Sun, thereby totally or partially obscuring the image of the Sun for a viewer on Earth. An annular solar eclipse occurs when the Moon's apparent diameter is smaller than the Sun's, blocking most of the Sun's light and causing the Sun to look like an annulus (ring). An annular eclipse appears as a partial eclipse over a region of the Earth thousands of kilometers wide.

== Description ==
The path of annularity passed through modern Greenland, Iceland (including Reykjavík), southern Norway, southern Sweden, Denmark (including Copenhagen), Poland (including Warsaw), Ukraine, Moldova, Russia, Georgia, eastern Turkey, Armenia, Azerbaijan, Iran (including Tehran), Afghanistan, Pakistan, and northern India.

The solar eclipse occurred during the Reign of Terror. The eclipse was partial from Paris, France.

The eclipse was part of Solar Saros 141.

== See also ==
- List of solar eclipses in the 18th century
