= Solar eclipse of July 20, 1925 =

20th-century annular solar eclipse

- Annular eclipse
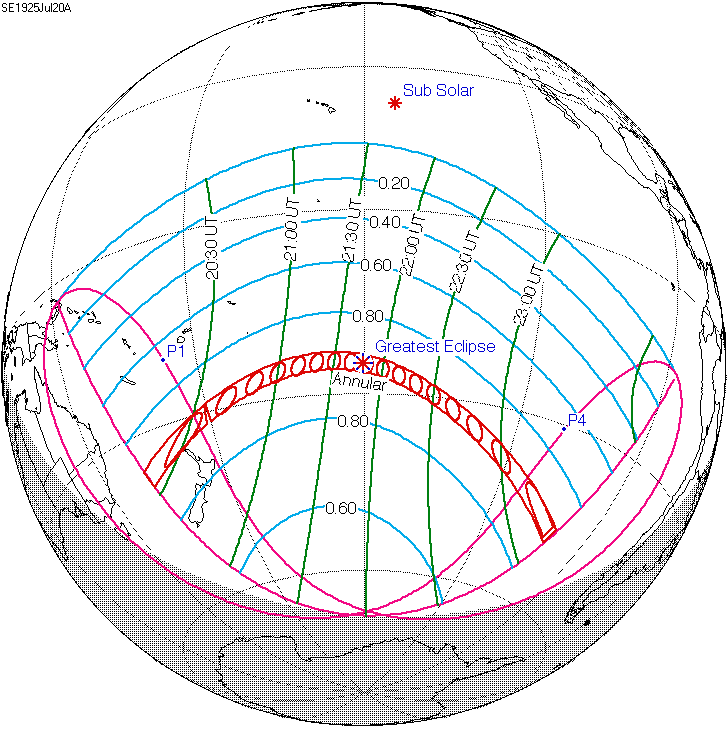
- Map
- Gamma: −0.7193
- Magnitude: 0.9436

Maximum eclipse
- Duration: 435 s (7 min 15 s)
- Coordinates: 25.3°S 150°W
- Max. width of band: 300 km (190 mi)

Times (UTC)
- Greatest eclipse: 21:48:42

References
- Saros: 125 (49 of 73)
- Catalog # (SE5000): 9340

An annular solar eclipse occurred at the Moon's ascending node of orbit between Monday, July 20 and Tuesday, July 21, 1925, with a magnitude of 0.9436. A solar eclipse occurs when the Moon passes between Earth and the Sun, thereby totally or partly obscuring the image of the Sun for a viewer on Earth. An annular solar eclipse occurs when the Moon's apparent diameter is smaller than the Sun's, blocking most of the Sun's light and causing the Sun to look like an annulus (ring). An annular eclipse appears as a partial eclipse over a region of the Earth thousands of kilometres wide. Occurring about 8 hours after apogee (on July 20, 1925, at 13:30 UTC), the Moon's apparent diameter was smaller.

Annularity was visible from northern part of Northland Region and the whole Kermadec Islands in New Zealand on July 21 (Tuesday), and Rapa Iti in French Polynesia on July 20 (Monday). A partial eclipse was visible for parts of Eastern Australia and Oceania.

== Eclipse details ==
Shown below are two tables displaying details about this particular solar eclipse. The first table outlines times at which the Moon's penumbra or umbra attains the specific parameter, and the second table describes various other parameters pertaining to this eclipse.

July 20, 1925 Solar Eclipse Times
Event	Time (UTC)
First Penumbral External Contact	1925 July 20 at 19:03:41.7 UTC
First Umbral External Contact	1925 July 20 at 20:23:08.9 UTC
First Central Line	1925 July 20 at 20:26:27.5 UTC
First Umbral Internal Contact	1925 July 20 at 20:29:50.5 UTC
Ecliptic Conjunction	1925 July 20 at 21:40:09.2 UTC
Greatest Duration	1925 July 20 at 21:46:03.5 UTC
Greatest Eclipse	1925 July 20 at 21:48:41.6 UTC
Equatorial Conjunction	1925 July 20 at 21:57:08.7 UTC
Last Umbral Internal Contact	1925 July 20 at 23:07:26.9 UTC
Last Central Line	1925 July 20 at 23:10:49.8 UTC
Last Umbral External Contact	1925 July 20 at 23:14:08.3 UTC
Last Penumbral External Contact	1925 July 21 at 00:33:37.3 UTC

July 20, 1925 Solar Eclipse Parameters
Parameter	Value
Eclipse Magnitude	0.94358
Eclipse Obscuration	0.89035
Gamma	−0.71927
Sun Right Ascension	07h58m46.0s
Sun Declination	+20°38'42.8"
Sun Semi-Diameter	15'44.4"
Sun Equatorial Horizontal Parallax	08.7"
Moon Right Ascension	07h58m29.8s
Moon Declination	+20°00'11.9"
Moon Semi-Diameter	14'42.0"
Moon Equatorial Horizontal Parallax	0°53'57.1"
ΔT	23.7 s

== Eclipse season ==
This eclipse is part of an eclipse season, a period, roughly every six months, when eclipses occur. Only two (or occasionally three) eclipse seasons occur each year, and each season lasts about 35 days and repeats just short of six months (173 days) later; thus two full eclipse seasons always occur each year. Either two or three eclipses happen each eclipse season. In the sequence below, each eclipse is separated by a fortnight.

Eclipse season of July–August 1925
July 20 Ascending node (new moon)	August 4 Descending node (full moon)
Annular solar eclipse Solar Saros 125	Partial lunar eclipse Lunar Saros 137

== Related eclipses ==
=== Eclipses in 1925 ===
- A total solar eclipse on January 24.
- A partial lunar eclipse on February 8.
- An annular solar eclipse on July 20.
- A partial lunar eclipse on August 4.

=== Metonic ===
- Preceded by: Solar eclipse of October 1, 1921
- Followed by: Solar eclipse of May 9, 1929

=== Tzolkinex ===
- Preceded by: Solar eclipse of June 8, 1918
- Followed by: Solar eclipse of August 31, 1932

=== Half-Saros ===
- Preceded by: Lunar eclipse of July 15, 1916
- Followed by: Lunar eclipse of July 26, 1934

=== Tritos ===
- Preceded by: Solar eclipse of August 21, 1914
- Followed by: Solar eclipse of June 19, 1936

=== Solar Saros 125 ===
- Preceded by: Solar eclipse of July 10, 1907
- Followed by: Solar eclipse of August 1, 1943

=== Inex ===
- Preceded by: Solar eclipse of August 9, 1896
- Followed by: Solar eclipse of June 30, 1954

=== Triad ===
- Preceded by: Solar eclipse of September 18, 1838
- Followed by: Solar eclipse of May 20, 2012

=== Solar eclipses of 1924–1928 ===
This eclipse is a member of a semester series. An eclipse in a semester series of solar eclipses repeats approximately every 177 days and 4 hours (a semester) at alternating nodes of the Moon's orbit.

The partial solar eclipses on March 5, 1924 and August 30, 1924 occur in the previous lunar year eclipse set, and the solar eclipses on May 19, 1928 and November 12, 1928 occur in the next lunar year eclipse set.

Solar eclipse series sets from 1924 to 1928
Ascending node			Descending node		
Saros	Map	Gamma	Saros	Map	Gamma
115	July 31, 1924 Partial	−1.4459	120	January 24, 1925 Total	0.8661
125	July 20, 1925 Annular	−0.7193	130 Totality in Sumatra, Indonesia	January 14, 1926 Total	0.1973
135	July 9, 1926 Annular	0.0538	140	January 3, 1927 Annular	−0.4956
145	June 29, 1927 Total	0.8163	150	December 24, 1927 Partial	−1.2416
155	June 17, 1928 Partial	1.5107			

=== Saros 125 ===
This eclipse is a part of Saros series 125, repeating every 18 years, 11 days, and containing 73 events. The series started with a partial solar eclipse on February 4, 1060. It contains total eclipses from June 13, 1276 through July 16, 1330; hybrid eclipses on July 26, 1348 and August 7, 1366; and annular eclipses from August 17, 1384 through August 22, 1979. The series ends at member 73 as a partial eclipse on April 9, 2358. Its eclipses are tabulated in three columns; every third eclipse in the same column is one exeligmos apart, so they all cast shadows over approximately the same parts of the Earth.

The longest duration of totality was produced by member 14 at 1 minutes, 11 seconds on June 25, 1294, and the longest duration of annularity was produced by member 48 at 7 minutes, 23 seconds on July 10, 1907. All eclipses in this series occur at the Moon’s ascending node of orbit.

Series members 43–64 occur between 1801 and 2200:
43	44	45
May 16, 1817	May 27, 1835	June 6, 1853
46	47	48
June 18, 1871	June 28, 1889	July 10, 1907
49	50	51
July 20, 1925	August 1, 1943	August 11, 1961
52	53	54
August 22, 1979	September 2, 1997	September 13, 2015
55	56	57
September 23, 2033	October 4, 2051	October 15, 2069
58	59	60
October 26, 2087	November 6, 2105	November 18, 2123
61	62	63
November 28, 2141	December 9, 2159	December 20, 2177
64
December 31, 2195

=== Metonic series ===
The metonic series repeats eclipses every 19 years (6939.69 days), lasting about 5 cycles. Eclipses occur in nearly the same calendar date. In addition, the octon subseries repeats 1/5 of that or every 3.8 years (1387.94 days). All eclipses in this table occur at the Moon's ascending node.

22 eclipse events between December 13, 1898 and July 20, 1982
December 13–14	October 1–2	July 20–21	May 9	February 24–25
111	113	115	117	119
December 13, 1898		July 21, 1906	May 9, 1910	February 25, 1914
121	123	125	127	129
December 14, 1917	October 1, 1921	July 20, 1925	May 9, 1929	February 24, 1933
131	133	135	137	139
December 13, 1936	October 1, 1940	July 20, 1944	May 9, 1948	February 25, 1952
141	143	145	147	149
December 14, 1955	October 2, 1959	July 20, 1963	May 9, 1967	February 25, 1971
151	153	155		
December 13, 1974	October 2, 1978	July 20, 1982		

=== Tritos series ===
This eclipse is a part of a tritos cycle, repeating at alternating nodes every 135 synodic months (≈ 3986.63 days, or 11 years minus 1 month). Their appearance and longitude are irregular due to a lack of synchronization with the anomalistic month (period of perigee), but groupings of 3 tritos cycles (≈ 33 years minus 3 months) come close (≈ 434.044 anomalistic months), so eclipses are similar in these groupings.

Series members between 1801 and 2200
June 26, 1805 (Saros 114)	May 27, 1816 (Saros 115)	April 26, 1827 (Saros 116)	March 25, 1838 (Saros 117)	February 23, 1849 (Saros 118)
January 23, 1860 (Saros 119)	December 22, 1870 (Saros 120)	November 21, 1881 (Saros 121)	October 20, 1892 (Saros 122)	September 21, 1903 (Saros 123)
August 21, 1914 (Saros 124)	July 20, 1925 (Saros 125)	June 19, 1936 (Saros 126)	May 20, 1947 (Saros 127)	April 19, 1958 (Saros 128)
March 18, 1969 (Saros 129)	February 16, 1980 (Saros 130)	January 15, 1991 (Saros 131)	December 14, 2001 (Saros 132)	November 13, 2012 (Saros 133)
October 14, 2023 (Saros 134)	September 12, 2034 (Saros 135)	August 12, 2045 (Saros 136)	July 12, 2056 (Saros 137)	June 11, 2067 (Saros 138)
May 11, 2078 (Saros 139)	April 10, 2089 (Saros 140)	March 10, 2100 (Saros 141)	February 8, 2111 (Saros 142)	January 8, 2122 (Saros 143)
December 7, 2132 (Saros 144)	November 7, 2143 (Saros 145)	October 7, 2154 (Saros 146)	September 5, 2165 (Saros 147)	August 4, 2176 (Saros 148)
July 6, 2187 (Saros 149)	June 4, 2198 (Saros 150)			

=== Inex series ===
This eclipse is a part of the long period inex cycle, repeating at alternating nodes, every 358 synodic months (≈ 10,571.95 days, or 29 years minus 20 days). Their appearance and longitude are irregular due to a lack of synchronization with the anomalistic month (period of perigee). However, groupings of 3 inex cycles (≈ 87 years minus 2 months) comes close (≈ 1,151.02 anomalistic months), so eclipses are similar in these groupings.

Series members between 1801 and 2200
October 9, 1809 (Saros 121)	September 18, 1838 (Saros 122)	August 29, 1867 (Saros 123)
August 9, 1896 (Saros 124)	July 20, 1925 (Saros 125)	June 30, 1954 (Saros 126)
June 11, 1983 (Saros 127)	May 20, 2012 (Saros 128)	April 30, 2041 (Saros 129)
April 11, 2070 (Saros 130)	March 21, 2099 (Saros 131)	March 1, 2128 (Saros 132)
February 9, 2157 (Saros 133)	January 20, 2186 (Saros 134)	
