= Solar eclipse of May 12, 1706 =

Total eclipse

- Total eclipse
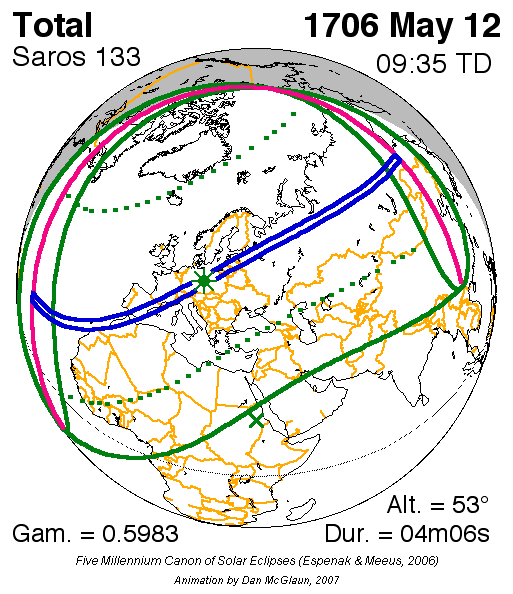
- Map
- Gamma: 0.5984
- Magnitude: 1.0591

Maximum eclipse
- Duration: 246 s (4 min 6 s)
- Coordinates: 51.5°N 15.2°E
- Max. width of band: 242 km (150 mi)

Times (UTC)
- Greatest eclipse: 9:35:09

References
- Saros: 133 (28 of 72)
- Catalog # (SE5000): 8802

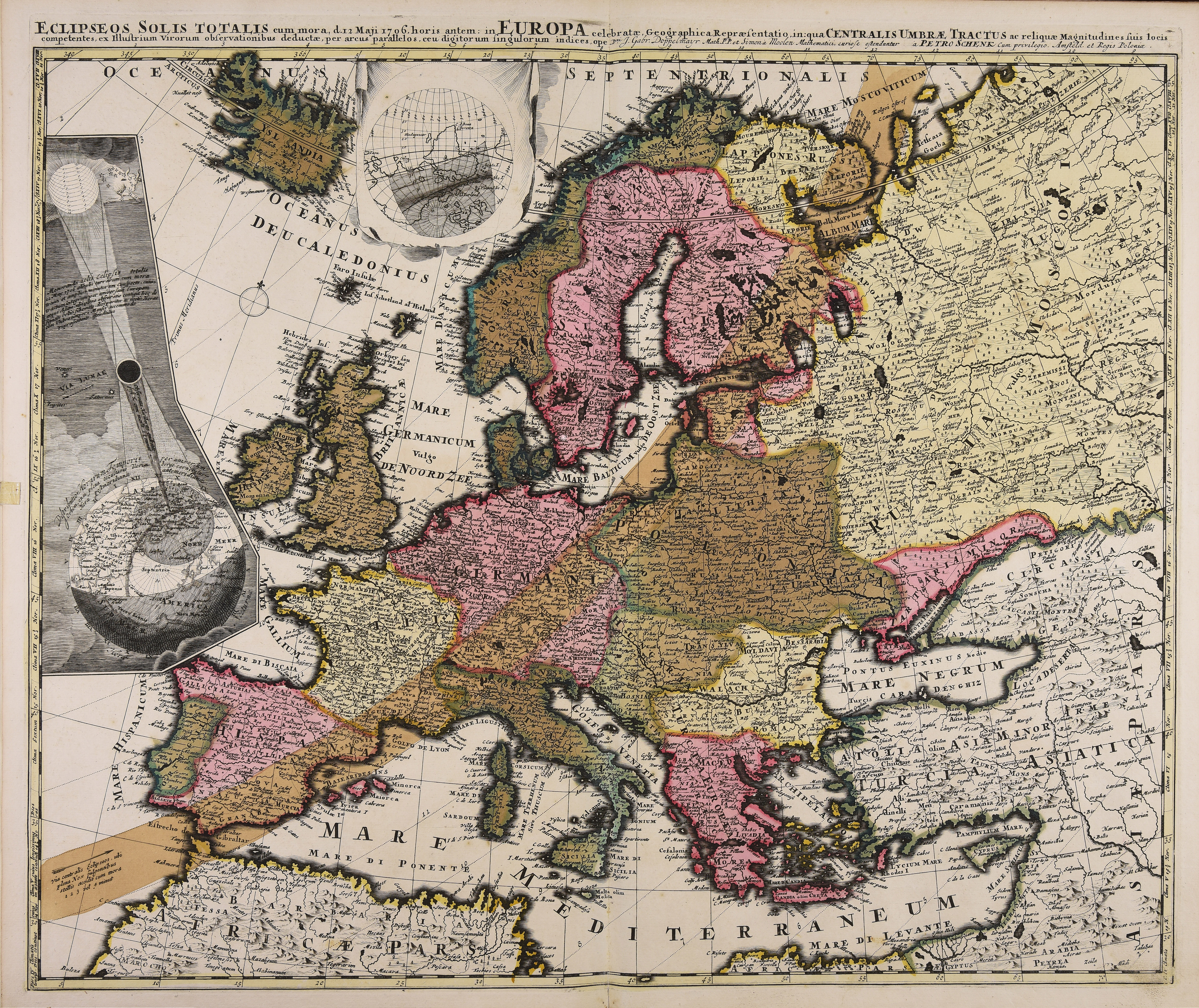
Map of the eclipse

A total solar eclipse occurred on May 12, 1706. The eclipse, part of Solar Saros 133, took place during the Spanish War of Succession, crossing Spain, France and Northern Italy: for this reason it was seen at the time as a metaphor and a premonitory sign of the decline of King Louis XIV of France (known as the Sun King) "occulted" by the Great Alliance.

== Description ==
The eclipse was visible in north and west Africa along with all Europe and its islands, Asia including the most of Middle East and almost all of Siberia and a small part of northeastern North America and the northern islands. It was also visible in the Atlantic. A very small portion occurred in the Southern Hemisphere almost entirely over the ocean. It was part of solar saros 133.

The umbral portion which was as far as 242 km (150 mi), it included areas that were 150 miles (250 km) northwest of the Cape Verdean island of Santo Antão (then a Portuguese colony) in the Atlantic, the Spanish controlled Canary Islands, Morocco including Casablanca, Rabat, Tangier and Tétouan, Gibraltar, Spain including Málaga, Valencia and Barcelona, France including Grenoble, Lyon, Nîmes and Marseille, Switzerland, Munich, Danzig (now Gdańsk, Poland), Masuria, much of the Baltic, Saint Petersburg, Russia, newly founded at the time and a part of the Russian north including the Samoyedic and Yakut areas and up to Manchuria. The greatest occurred in the area between Saxony and Lower Silesia (now in Poland) at 51.5 N, 15.2 E at 9:35 UTC (10:35 CET) and lasted for over 4 minutes.

The eclipse showed up to 50% obscuration in Burkina Faso, Mai, Songhai, Benghazi in Libya, Ankara, Sinope, the north of the Caspian and a part of Mongolia and on the other side, northwestern Islands and the east shore of Greenland. It was 75% obscuration in places like Norway, Lapland and Zemlya and on the other side around Bissau, Syracuse in Sicily and Bucharest. Places that was 25% obscuration of the sun included Kingdom of Benin, Egypt and Babylon in Iraq (then commonly as Mesopotamia). Areas that were on the rim of the eclipse included Gabon, Darfur, Nubia, the north of the Arabian Peninsula, Persia, the Afghan Empire, Nepal, Assam and Manchurian controlled Yunnan.

The eclipse started in the middle of the Atlantic and finished at sunset in Siberia, Korea and China.

The subsolar marking was in Nubia.

== Scientific and historical significance ==
The eclipse was the first to be the subject of predictive maps. Unlike the famous Halley's eclipse of 1715, the eclipse was not total in England. However John Flamsteed, based on a letter by a Captayn Stanyan in Bern, reported to the Royal Society that, for the first time to his knowledge, someone "took notice of a red streak preceding the emersion of the sun's body from a total eclipse", erroneously attributing it to the atmosphere of the Moon. Also Johann Jakob Scheuchzer reported on the eclipse's "red streak" relating it to the Moon's atmosphere.

The eclipse took place during the very low solar activity period known as the Maunder Minimum and from accounts and drawings of the totality, it is believed the bright K-corona (the corona type normally witnessed in totality) was not visible and only the symmetrical, circular, dim F-corona was seen (the corona type which can normally be seen farther from the Sun as it is greatly overshadowed by the K-corona). The eclipse also coincided with the Grand Alliance victory at Barcelona and the siege of Turin, and was widely interpreted as the "eclipse of Sun King", i.e., the dimming of Louis XIV, king of France, while the French court officially regarded the eclipse only as a scientific phenomenon.

== See also ==
- List of solar eclipses in the 18th century
- List of solar eclipses visible from Russia
