= List of solar eclipses in the 18th century =

This is a list of solar eclipses in the 18th century. During the period 1701 to 1800 there were 251 solar eclipses of which 92 were partial, 78 were annular, 62 were total, and 19 were hybrids. The greatest number of eclipses in one year was four, occurring in 16 different years: 1707, 1714, 1725, 1729, 1736, 1743, 1747, 1750, 1754, 1758, 1765, 1772, 1776, 1783, 1790, and 1794. Dates are based on the Gregorian calendar.

Date	Time of greatest eclipse	Saros cycle	Type	Magnitude	Central duration	Location	Path width	Geographical area	Ref(s)
7 February 1701	23:04:53	116	Annular	0.9219	09m 55s	25.9°N 171.7°W	393 km (244 mi)		
4 August 1701	09:31:44	121	Total	1.0521	05m 06s	9.4°S 33.7°E	193 km (120 mi)		
28 January 1702	01:37:10	126	Annular	0.9636	04m 14s	21.2°S 159.6°E	132 km (82 mi)		
24 July 1702	21:38:51	131	Hybrid	1.0001	00m 01s	38.4°N 140.4°W	1 km (0.62 mi)		
17 January 1703	11:24:25	136	Hybrid	1.0120	00m 50s	67.9°S 22.2°E	61 km (38 mi)		
14 July 1703	02:36:34	141	Partial	0.7580	—	67.9°N 46.3°W	—		
8 December 1703	15:41:30	108	Partial	0.4281	—	64.6°N 29.5°W	—		
7 January 1704	02:14:51	146	Partial	0.3177	—	67.4°S 35.5°W	—		
2 June 1704	13:02:36	113	Annular	0.9542	04m 26s	49.1°S 3.4°E	578 km (359 mi)		
27 November 1704	05:33:52	118	Annular	0.9999	00m 01s	19.7°N 104.9°E	1 km (0.62 mi)		
22 May 1705	19:55:06	123	Hybrid	1.0147	01m 32s	12.2°N 117.0°W	51 km (32 mi)		
16 November 1705	13:23:06	128	Annular	0.9514	05m 31s	20.4°S 25.0°W	178 km (111 mi)		
12 May 1706	09:35:09	133	Total	1.0591	04m 06s	51.5°N 15.2°E	242 km (150 mi)		
5 November 1706	14:23:57	138	Annular	0.9195	07m 02s	57.0°S 72.6°W	449 km (279 mi)		
2 April 1707	18:12:25	105	Partial	0.5082	—	61.1°S 11.1°W	—		
2 May 1707	02:28:17	143	Partial	0.4339	—	62.2°N 21.4°E	—		
25 September 1707	23:05:05	110	Partial	0.1603	—	61.1°N 80.0°W	—		
25 October 1707	14:17:22	148	Partial	0.2528	—	61.6°S 151.3°W	—		
22 March 1708	06:51:37	115	Annular	0.9913	00m 46s	30.4°S 98.3°E	37 km (23 mi)		
14 September 1708	09:00:22	120	Total	1.0281	02m 10s	39.2°N 68.3°E	126 km (78 mi)		
11 March 1709	12:18:35	125	Annular	0.9422	06m 29s	3.4°N 5.9°W	216 km (134 mi)		
4 September 1709	00:32:26	130	Total	1.0703	05m 47s	3.7°N 169.7°E	229 km (142 mi)		
28 February 1710	12:07:29	135	Annular	0.9194	08m 00s	42.5°N 31.2°W	562 km (349 mi)		
24 August 1710	17:17:16	140	Total	1.0519	04m 00s	36.5°S 105.1°W	282 km (175 mi)		
18 January 1711	22:23:38	107	Partial	0.3075	—	63.5°S 14.4°W	—		
17 February 1711	13:30:15	145	Partial	0.0919	—	61.6°N 85.4°W	—		
15 July 1711	19:22:11	112	Partial	0.8216	—	63.9°N 34.6°E	—		
8 January 1712	09:58:39	117	Total	1.0258	01m 48s	60.6°S 49.2°E	114 km (71 mi)		
3 July 1712	22:34:57	122	Annular	0.9503	05m 18s	42.8°N 152.7°W	194 km (121 mi)		
28 December 1712	01:24:55	127	Total	1.0466	04m 15s	21.5°S 159.0°E	155 km (96 mi)		
22 June 1713	23:15:39	132	Annular	0.9576	05m 45s	1.3°S 171.2°W	170 km (110 mi)		
17 December 1713	16:04:20	137	Hybrid	1.0094	00m 56s	23.1°N 64.8°W	47 km (29 mi)		
13 May 1714	18:39:35	104	Partial	0.1007	—	69.4°N 106.9°E	—		
12 June 1714	04:40:01	142	Partial	0.6976	—	66.8°S 105.8°E	—		
7 November 1714	09:04:34	109	Partial	0.1730	—	70.1°S 103.9°W	—		
7 December 1714	01:27:09	147	Partial	0.1420	—	67.4°N 159.0°E	—		
3 May 1715	09:36:30	114	Total	1.0632	04m 14s	59.4°N 17.9°E	295 km (183 mi)		
27 October 1715	09:02:48	119	Annular	0.9206	07m 02s	62.5°S 15.5°E	494 km (307 mi)		
22 April 1716	02:28:33	124	Total	1.0625	05m 43s	11.8°N 142.6°E	205 km (127 mi)		
15 October 1716	10:07:39	129	Annular	0.9570	05m 10s	12.5°S 23.5°E	157 km (98 mi)		
11 April 1717	16:34:40	134	Hybrid	1.0072	00m 39s	39.5°S 52.1°W	39 km (24 mi)		
4 October 1717	18:08:27	139	Hybrid	1.0104	00m 56s	34.6°N 81.1°W	47 km (29 mi)		
2 March 1718	07:31:37	106	Partial	0.3285	—	71.8°N 3.2°E	—		
26 August 1718	00:41:45	111	Partial	0.5837	—	71.2°S 113.7°E	—		
24 September 1718	08:34:20	149	Partial	0.3889	—	72.0°N 138.3°E	—		
19 February 1719	06:52:57	116	Annular	0.9250	09m 01s	30.5°N 68.6°E	384 km (239 mi)		
15 August 1719	16:59:51	121	Total	1.0466	04m 27s	16.8°S 81.1°W	181 km (112 mi)		
8 February 1720	09:52:31	126	Annular	0.9681	03m 40s	17.4°S 36.1°E	115 km (71 mi)		
4 August 1720	04:38:15	131	Annular	0.9957	00m 27s	31.1°N 114.8°E	16 km (9.9 mi)		
27 January 1721	20:05:11	136	Total	1.0158	01m 07s	64.0°S 102.4°W	79 km (49 mi)		
24 July 1721	09:06:55	141	Partial	0.8990	—	68.9°N 155.2°W	—		
19 December 1721	00:31:51	108	Partial	0.4172	—	65.7°N 172.0°W	—		
17 January 1722	11:07:10	146	Partial	0.3251	—	68.5°S 179.9°W	—		
13 June 1722	19:40:19	113	Partial	0.9083	—	65.2°S 93.5°W	—		
8 December 1722	14:07:35	118	Annular	0.9955	00m 28s	19.5°N 25.4°W	21 km (13 mi)		
3 June 1723	03:05:13	123	Total	1.0196	02m 05s	9.6°N 136.1°E	69 km (43 mi)		
27 November 1723	21:28:16	128	Annular	0.9471	06m 12s	22.0°S 145.2°W	195 km (121 mi)		
22 May 1724	17:10:09	133	Total	1.0640	04m 33s	50.7°N 92.8°W	247 km (153 mi)		
15 November 1724	22:07:38	138	Annular	0.9174	07m 15s	59.9°S 175.0°E	448 km (278 mi)		
13 April 1725	02:11:23	105	Partial	0.4193	—	61.4°S 139.6°W	—		
12 May 1725	10:12:19	143	Partial	0.5447	—	62.8°N 103.7°W	—		
6 October 1725	06:39:42	110	Partial	0.0923	—	61.2°N 157.7°E	—		
4 November 1725	22:02:52	148	Partial	0.3038	—	62.1°S 83.5°E	—		
2 April 1726	14:38:16	115	Annular	0.9906	00m 52s	29.2°S 18.3°W	42 km (26 mi)		
25 September 1726	16:51:45	120	Total	1.0273	02m 07s	38.0°N 49.0°W	129 km (80 mi)		
22 March 1727	19:47:55	125	Annular	0.9432	06m 20s	5.7°N 118.0°W	211 km (131 mi)		
15 September 1727	08:27:31	130	Total	1.0681	05m 33s	2.2°N 51.4°E	222 km (138 mi)		
10 March 1728	19:38:56	135	Annular	0.9233	07m 25s	42.8°N 144.6°W	485 km (301 mi)		
4 September 1728	00:59:22	140	Total	1.0484	03m 44s	35.0°S 139.6°E	236 km (147 mi)		
29 January 1729	06:48:43	107	Partial	0.2993	—	62.8°S 149.9°W	—		
27 February 1729	21:27:02	145	Partial	0.1347	—	61.2°N 146.6°E	—		
26 July 1729	02:10:40	112	Partial	0.6746	—	63.1°N 76.9°W	—		
24 August 1729	13:48:31	150	Partial	0.0067	—	61.7°S 95.2°W	—		
18 January 1730	18:45:15	117	Total	1.0285	01m 59s	57.8°S 77.4°W	126 km (78 mi)		
15 July 1730	04:59:09	122	Annular	0.9484	05m 13s	46.3°N 115.9°E	210 km (130 mi)		
8 January 1731	10:17:44	127	Total	1.0464	04m 10s	20.7°S 27.0°E	155 km (96 mi)		
4 July 1731	05:46:25	132	Annular	0.9602	05m 15s	3.8°N 90.8°E	153 km (95 mi)		
29 December 1731	00:46:53	137	Hybrid	1.0065	00m 39s	22.7°N 162.2°E	32 km (20 mi)		
22 June 1732	11:38:48	142	Partial	0.8457	—	65.8°S 9.3°W	—		
17 November 1732	16:58:51	109	Partial	0.1389	—	69.2°S 125.3°E	—		
17 December 1732	09:46:57	147	Partial	0.1470	—	66.3°N 23.4°E	—		
13 May 1733	17:18:29	114	Total	1.0656	04m 06s	67.9°N 99.5°W	339 km (211 mi)		
6 November 1733	16:40:15	119	Annular	0.9179	06m 53s	69.0°S 101.2°W	548 km (341 mi)		
3 May 1734	10:15:56	124	Total	1.0635	05m 46s	18.4°N 24.6°E	208 km (129 mi)		
26 October 1734	17:53:28	129	Annular	0.9567	05m 08s	18.2°S 93.8°W	159 km (99 mi)		
23 April 1735	00:11:36	134	Hybrid	1.0077	00m 44s	32.2°S 171.0°W	38 km (24 mi)		
16 October 1735	02:10:34	139	Hybrid	1.0110	01m 02s	28.3°N 155.2°E	48 km (30 mi)		
12 March 1736	15:05:55	106	Partial	0.2733	—	72.1°N 124.5°W	—		
11 April 1736	07:18:07	144	Partial	0.0748	—	71.5°S 134.3°E	—		
5 September 1736	08:30:26	111	Partial	0.4775	—	71.7°S 17.1°W	—		
4 October 1736	16:41:34	149	Partial	0.4670	—	71.9°N 2.4°E	—		
1 March 1737	14:35:17	116	Annular	0.9283	08m 04s	36.0°N 50.1°W	378 km (235 mi)		
26 August 1737	00:32:08	121	Total	1.0407	03m 44s	24.4°S 162.5°E	167 km (104 mi)		
18 February 1738	18:02:31	126	Annular	0.9732	03m 03s	12.8°S 86.7°W	96 km (60 mi)		
15 August 1738	11:40:12	131	Annular	0.9907	01m 00s	23.7°N 8.4°E	33 km (21 mi)		
8 February 1739	04:41:13	136	Total	1.0203	01m 27s	59.2°S 131.0°E	99 km (62 mi)		
4 August 1739	15:40:56	141	Annular	0.9408	03m 59s	79.9°N 42.9°E	801 km (498 mi)		
30 December 1739	09:22:03	108	Partial	0.4062	—	66.7°N 45.1°E	—		
28 January 1740	19:54:59	146	Partial	0.3387	—	69.5°S 36.2°E	—		
24 June 1740	02:18:54	113	Partial	0.7697	—	66.2°S 156.7°E	—		
18 December 1740	22:43:17	118	Annular	0.9917	00m 53s	19.9°N 156.4°W	40 km (25 mi)		
13 June 1741	10:12:48	123	Total	1.0239	02m 35s	6.0°N 29.4°E	85 km (53 mi)		
8 December 1741	05:38:00	128	Annular	0.9434	06m 51s	23.0°S 93.6°E	209 km (130 mi)		
3 June 1742	00:39:57	133	Total	1.0683	05m 00s	49.0°N 160.2°E	251 km (156 mi)		
27 November 1742	05:58:59	138	Annular	0.9156	07m 26s	62.6°S 62.2°E	450 km (280 mi)		
24 April 1743	10:00:10	105	Partial	0.3152	—	61.8°S 94.4°E	—		
23 May 1743	17:48:55	143	Partial	0.6672	—	63.5°N 132.9°E	—		
17 October 1743	14:25:42	110	Partial	0.0387	—	61.5°N 32.5°E	—		
16 November 1743	05:58:25	148	Partial	0.3424	—	62.8°S 44.4°W	—		
12 April 1744	22:15:24	115	Annular	0.9895	00m 59s	29.1°S 132.6°W	49 km (30 mi)		
6 October 1744	00:51:24	120	Total	1.0263	02m 04s	37.0°N 169.1°W	132 km (82 mi)		
2 April 1745	03:09:18	125	Annular	0.9444	06m 13s	7.7°N 132.2°E	205 km (127 mi)		
25 September 1745	16:28:56	130	Total	1.0655	05m 21s	0.3°N 68.6°W	214 km (133 mi)		
22 March 1746	03:02:49	135	Annular	0.9277	06m 51s	43.5°N 104.7°E	419 km (260 mi)		
15 September 1746	08:46:37	140	Total	1.0441	03m 23s	34.9°S 23.0°E	200 km (120 mi)		
9 February 1747	15:11:18	107	Partial	0.2860	—	62.1°S 75.5°E	—		
11 March 1747	05:18:08	145	Partial	0.1872	—	61.0°N 20.2°E	—		
6 August 1747	09:01:21	112	Partial	0.5339	—	62.4°N 171.3°E	—		
4 September 1747	21:07:57	150	Partial	0.1086	—	61.4°S 146.1°E	—		
30 January 1748	03:29:13	117	Total	1.0316	02m 12s	54.4°S 154.8°E	140 km (87 mi)		
25 July 1748	11:27:02	122	Annular	0.9461	05m 12s	48.7°N 24.5°E	231 km (144 mi)		
18 January 1749	19:08:56	127	Total	1.0465	04m 07s	19.1°S 104.9°W	155 km (96 mi)		
14 July 1749	12:19:20	132	Annular	0.9623	04m 46s	7.8°N 7.2°W	141 km (88 mi)		
8 January 1750	09:28:43	137	Hybrid	1.0041	00m 24s	23.0°N 29.3°E	20 km (12 mi)		
3 July 1750	18:38:52	142	Partial	0.9956	—	64.8°S 124.3°W	—		
29 November 1750	00:58:14	109	Partial	0.1129	—	68.2°S 6.2°W	—		
28 December 1750	18:06:51	147	Partial	0.1506	—	65.3°N 111.8°W	—		
25 May 1751	00:55:16	114	Total	1.0670	03m 53s	77.0°N 144.7°E	402 km (250 mi)		
18 November 1751	00:26:00	119	Annular	0.9159	06m 45s	74.9°S 142.8°E	597 km (371 mi)		
13 May 1752	17:56:29	124	Total	1.0637	05m 42s	24.9°N 91.1°W	210 km (130 mi)		
6 November 1752	01:48:14	129	Annular	0.9567	05m 03s	23.2°S 147.4°E	159 km (99 mi)		
3 May 1753	07:39:40	134	Hybrid	1.0079	00m 48s	24.9°S 73.0°E	36 km (22 mi)		
26 October 1753	10:22:01	139	Hybrid	1.0115	01m 08s	22.7°N 29.7°E	49 km (30 mi)		
23 March 1754	22:28:59	106	Partial	0.2032	—	72.1°N 110.6°E	—		
22 April 1754	14:25:57	144	Partial	0.1669	—	71.0°S 14.0°E	—		
16 September 1754	16:25:41	111	Partial	0.3821	—	71.9°S 149.9°W	—		
16 October 1754	00:57:46	149	Partial	0.5314	—	71.5°N 135.5°W	—		
12 March 1755	22:09:32	116	Annular	0.9319	07m 07s	42.2°N 167.4°W	375 km (233 mi)		
6 September 1755	08:09:46	121	Total	1.0342	03m 00s	32.1°S 44.3°E	150 km (93 mi)		
1 March 1756	02:07:09	126	Annular	0.9787	02m 24s	7.5°S 151.4°E	76 km (47 mi)		
25 August 1756	18:46:17	131	Annular	0.9853	01m 38s	16.1°N 99.5°W	52 km (32 mi)		
18 February 1757	13:14:12	136	Total	1.0251	01m 51s	53.8°S 2.9°E	119 km (74 mi)		
14 August 1757	22:16:45	141	Annular	0.9407	04m 36s	71.6°N 113.5°W	467 km (290 mi)		
9 January 1758	18:13:42	108	Partial	0.3972	—	67.8°N 98.7°W	—		
8 February 1758	04:40:52	146	Partial	0.3549	—	70.4°S 107.8°W	—		
5 July 1758	08:57:44	113	Partial	0.6302	—	67.2°S 46.4°E	—		
30 December 1758	07:20:12	118	Annular	0.9885	01m 15s	20.8°N 72.2°E	56 km (35 mi)		
24 June 1759	17:20:59	123	Total	1.0275	02m 59s	1.4°N 78.1°W	101 km (63 mi)		
19 December 1759	13:50:05	128	Annular	0.9404	07m 25s	23.3°S 28.0°W	221 km (137 mi)		
13 June 1760	08:09:15	133	Total	1.0719	05m 27s	46.0°N 52.7°E	254 km (158 mi)		
7 December 1760	13:53:44	138	Annular	0.9144	07m 36s	64.7°S 49.4°W	451 km (280 mi)		
4 May 1761	17:43:11	105	Partial	0.2031	—	62.4°S 30.3°W	—		
3 June 1761	01:22:38	143	Partial	0.7939	—	64.4°N 9.9°E	—		
26 November 1761	14:00:27	148	Partial	0.3732	—	63.7°S 174.2°W	—		
24 April 1762	05:42:10	115	Annular	0.9881	01m 08s	30.3°S 115.6°E	61 km (38 mi)		
17 October 1762	09:00:34	120	Total	1.0253	02m 02s	36.2°N 67.6°E	135 km (84 mi)		
13 April 1763	10:19:31	125	Annular	0.9455	06m 11s	9.0°N 25.3°E	201 km (125 mi)		
7 October 1763	00:39:04	130	Total	1.0627	05m 09s	2.0°S 169.1°E	206 km (128 mi)		
1 April 1764	10:17:15	135	Annular	0.9323	06m 20s	44.2°N 2.5°W	361 km (224 mi)		
25 September 1764	16:41:43	140	Total	1.0394	03m 01s	36.0°S 95.5°W	171 km (106 mi)		
19 February 1765	23:28:38	107	Partial	0.2635	—	61.6°S 57.7°W	—		
21 March 1765	13:01:45	145	Partial	0.2524	—	61.0°N 104.3°W	—		
16 August 1765	15:54:02	112	Partial	0.3994	—	61.8°N 59.2°E	—		
15 September 1765	04:32:34	150	Partial	0.2009	—	61.1°S 26.2°E	—		
9 February 1766	12:09:44	117	Total	1.0352	02m 27s	50.7°S 26.6°E	156 km (97 mi)		
5 August 1766	17:56:58	122	Annular	0.9433	05m 15s	50.2°N 67.0°W	260 km (160 mi)		
30 January 1767	03:56:55	127	Total	1.0471	04m 06s	16.8°S 123.9°E	157 km (98 mi)		
25 July 1767	18:55:48	132	Annular	0.9638	04m 21s	10.8°N 105.5°W	132 km (82 mi)		
19 January 1768	18:09:29	137	Hybrid	1.0022	00m 13s	23.9°N 103.2°W	11 km (6.8 mi)		
14 July 1768	01:40:57	142	Hybrid	1.0055	00m 29s	43.0°S 137.4°E	48 km (30 mi)		
9 December 1768	09:01:39	109	Partial	0.0932	—	67.1°S 138.1°W	—		
8 January 1769	02:26:42	147	Partial	0.1530	—	64.3°N 113.5°E	—		
4 June 1769	08:28:34	114	Total	1.0671	03m 36s	87.3°N 26.2°E	521 km (324 mi)		
28 November 1769	08:18:40	119	Annular	0.9144	06m 38s	80.0°S 32.0°E	638 km (396 mi)		
25 May 1770	01:30:12	124	Total	1.0634	05m 31s	31.2°N 155.6°E	211 km (131 mi)		
17 November 1770	09:51:53	129	Annular	0.9571	04m 56s	27.3°S 27.1°E	158 km (98 mi)		
14 May 1771	15:00:02	134	Hybrid	1.0076	00m 49s	17.8°S 40.4°W	33 km (21 mi)		
6 November 1771	18:41:02	139	Hybrid	1.0120	01m 13s	17.9°N 97.3°W	50 km (31 mi)		
3 April 1772	05:43:53	106	Partial	0.1229	—	71.9°N 12.3°W	—		
2 May 1772	21:26:41	144	Partial	0.2683	—	70.2°S 104.1°W	—		
27 September 1772	00:28:19	111	Partial	0.2988	—	72.0°S 75.4°E	—		
26 October 1772	09:21:18	149	Partial	0.5846	—	70.9°N 85.1°E	—		
23 March 1773	05:36:58	116	Annular	0.9357	06m 13s	49.3°N 76.2°E	378 km (235 mi)		
16 September 1773	15:52:23	121	Total	1.0275	02m 18s	39.9°S 75.5°W	130 km (81 mi)		
12 March 1774	10:05:14	126	Annular	0.9845	01m 43s	1.7°S 30.8°E	55 km (34 mi)		
6 September 1774	01:57:40	131	Annular	0.9797	02m 20s	8.7°N 150.9°E	72 km (45 mi)		
1 March 1775	21:39:20	136	Total	1.0304	02m 20s	47.9°S 124.8°W	139 km (86 mi)		
26 August 1775	04:59:40	141	Annular	0.9391	05m 16s	61.3°N 132.0°E	383 km (238 mi)		
21 January 1776	03:02:27	108	Partial	0.3847	—	68.8°N 117.6°E	—		
19 February 1776	13:20:11	146	Partial	0.3800	—	71.1°S 109.2°E	—		
15 July 1776	15:39:29	113	Partial	0.4935	—	68.2°S 65.1°W	—		
14 August 1776	05:22:56	151	Partial	0.0435	—	70.6°N 123.5°W	—		
9 January 1777	15:55:35	118	Annular	0.9859	01m 32s	22.4°N 58.9°W	70 km (43 mi)		
5 July 1777	00:29:29	123	Total	1.0305	03m 17s	4.2°S 173.7°E	115 km (71 mi)		
29 December 1777	22:03:28	128	Annular	0.9380	07m 53s	22.7°S 150.0°W	231 km (144 mi)		
24 June 1778	15:34:56	133	Total	1.0746	05m 52s	41.8°N 55.0°W	255 km (158 mi)		
18 December 1778	21:53:54	138	Annular	0.9137	07m 44s	65.8°S 160.6°W	450 km (280 mi)		
16 May 1779	01:17:39	105	Partial	0.0796	—	63.0°S 153.1°W	—		
14 June 1779	08:51:28	143	Partial	0.9276	—	65.3°N 112.1°W	—		
7 December 1779	22:08:56	148	Partial	0.3962	—	64.6°S 54.2°E	—		
4 May 1780	13:00:42	115	Annular	0.9861	01m 21s	33.3°S 5.9°E	81 km (50 mi)		
27 October 1780	17:18:27	120	Total	1.0244	02m 00s	35.6°N 58.6°W	138 km (86 mi)		
23 April 1781	17:21:26	125	Annular	0.9467	06m 13s	9.7°N 79.2°W	197 km (122 mi)		
17 October 1781	08:55:59	130	Total	1.0596	04m 59s	4.3°S 45.1°E	197 km (122 mi)		
12 April 1782	17:24:47	135	Annular	0.9370	05m 51s	45.1°N 107.1°W	311 km (193 mi)		
7 October 1782	00:43:19	140	Total	1.0344	02m 37s	37.9°S 144.6°E	144 km (89 mi)		
3 March 1783	07:40:30	107	Partial	0.2312	—	61.3°S 170.5°E	—		
1 April 1783	20:38:39	145	Partial	0.3299	—	61.0°N 132.8°E	—		
27 August 1783	22:52:06	112	Partial	0.2757	—	61.4°N 54.1°W	—		
26 September 1783	12:04:17	150	Partial	0.2814	—	61.1°S 95.4°W	—		
20 February 1784	20:45:38	117	Total	1.0389	02m 44s	47.2°S 101.5°W	174 km (108 mi)		
16 August 1784	00:31:53	122	Annular	0.9402	05m 23s	50.9°N 159.8°W	299 km (186 mi)		
9 February 1785	12:40:41	127	Total	1.0480	04m 07s	14.1°S 6.6°W	159 km (99 mi)		
5 August 1785	01:37:22	132	Annular	0.9650	04m 01s	12.7°N 155.3°E	127 km (79 mi)		
30 January 1786	02:45:26	137	Hybrid	1.0009	00m 05s	25.1°N 125.5°E	5 km (3.1 mi)		
25 July 1786	08:46:33	142	Total	1.0106	00m 59s	34.6°S 30.8°E	66 km (41 mi)		
20 December 1786	17:07:24	109	Partial	0.0772	—	66.0°S 89.9°E	—		
19 January 1787	10:43:13	147	Partial	0.1591	—	63.4°N 20.1°W	—		
15 June 1787	15:59:25	114	Total	1.0648	03m 09s	78.7°N 104.8°E	998 km (620 mi)		
9 December 1787	16:15:38	119	Annular	0.9136	06m 32s	83.4°S 62.7°W	672 km (418 mi)		
4 June 1788	08:59:31	124	Total	1.0623	05m 15s	37.0°N 44.4°E	211 km (131 mi)		
27 November 1788	18:02:54	129	Annular	0.9579	04m 46s	30.4°S 94.3°W	155 km (96 mi)	South Pacific Ocean and South America. Observed by William Bligh during the voyage which led to the Mutiny on the Bounty.	
24 May 1789	22:11:58	134	Hybrid	1.0068	00m 46s	11.0°S 151.0°W	28 km (17 mi)		
17 November 1789	03:08:35	139	Hybrid	1.0126	01m 19s	14.1°N 133.9°E	52 km (32 mi)		
14 April 1790	12:48:15	106	Partial	0.0287	—	71.4°N 132.1°W	—		
14 May 1790	04:17:21	144	Partial	0.3840	—	69.4°S 140.9°E	—		
8 October 1790	08:38:52	111	Partial	0.2287	—	71.7°S 61.3°W	—		
6 November 1790	17:53:11	149	Partial	0.6245	—	70.1°N 55.8°W	—		
3 April 1791	12:55:13	116	Annular	0.9394	05m 21s	57.1°N 39.5°W	394 km (245 mi)		
27 September 1791	23:42:30	121	Total	1.0206	01m 38s	47.6°S 162.4°E	106 km (66 mi)		
22 March 1792	17:57:34	126	Annular	0.9905	01m 02s	4.5°N 88.7°W	33 km (21 mi)		
16 September 1792	09:13:52	131	Annular	0.9739	03m 02s	1.3°N 39.9°E	93 km (58 mi)		
12 March 1793	06:00:07	136	Total	1.0359	02m 51s	41.7°S 107.8°E	158 km (98 mi)		
5 September 1793	11:47:24	141	Annular	0.9370	06m 02s	51.7°N 23.0°E	347 km (216 mi)		
31 January 1794	11:48:45	108	Partial	0.3680	—	69.8°N 26.0°W	—		
1 March 1794	21:54:00	146	Partial	0.4136	—	71.6°S 32.9°W	—		
26 July 1794	22:24:27	113	Partial	0.3599	—	69.1°S 178.0°W	—		
25 August 1794	12:08:56	151	Partial	0.1709	—	71.3°N 121.9°E	—		
21 January 1795	00:29:13	118	Annular	0.9837	01m 44s	24.8°N 170.3°E	81 km (50 mi)		
16 July 1795	07:41:36	123	Total	1.0327	03m 26s	10.4°S 63.8°E	130 km (81 mi)		
10 January 1796	06:14:52	128	Annular	0.9362	08m 15s	21.1°S 88.3°E	238 km (148 mi)		
4 July 1796	23:02:54	133	Total	1.0764	06m 15s	36.8°N 164.6°W	255 km (158 mi)		
29 December 1796	05:54:58	138	Annular	0.9136	07m 51s	65.5°S 88.6°E	446 km (277 mi)		
24 June 1797	16:18:13	143	Total	1.0570	02m 47s	77.2°N 133.9°E	975 km (606 mi)		
18 December 1797	06:21:51	148	Partial	0.4142	—	65.6°S 79.0°W	—		
15 May 1798	20:10:32	115	Annular	0.9832	01m 36s	38.6°S 101.6°W	121 km (75 mi)		
8 November 1798	01:44:39	120	Total	1.0237	01m 59s	35.1°N 172.5°E	141 km (88 mi)		
5 May 1799	00:13:08	125	Annular	0.9476	06m 20s	9.3°N 178.9°E	194 km (121 mi)		
28 October 1799	17:21:46	130	Total	1.0566	04m 50s	6.7°S 81.3°W	188 km (117 mi)		
24 April 1800	00:24:00	135	Annular	0.9417	05m 27s	45.7°N 151.3°E	269 km (167 mi)		
18 October 1800	08:51:53	140	Total	1.0293	02m 14s	40.3°S 23.2°E	120 km (75 mi)		

== See also ==
- List of solar eclipses in the 19th century
- List of solar eclipses in the 20th century
- List of solar eclipses in the 21st century
