= Solar eclipse of August 9, 1896 =

Total eclipse

- Total eclipse
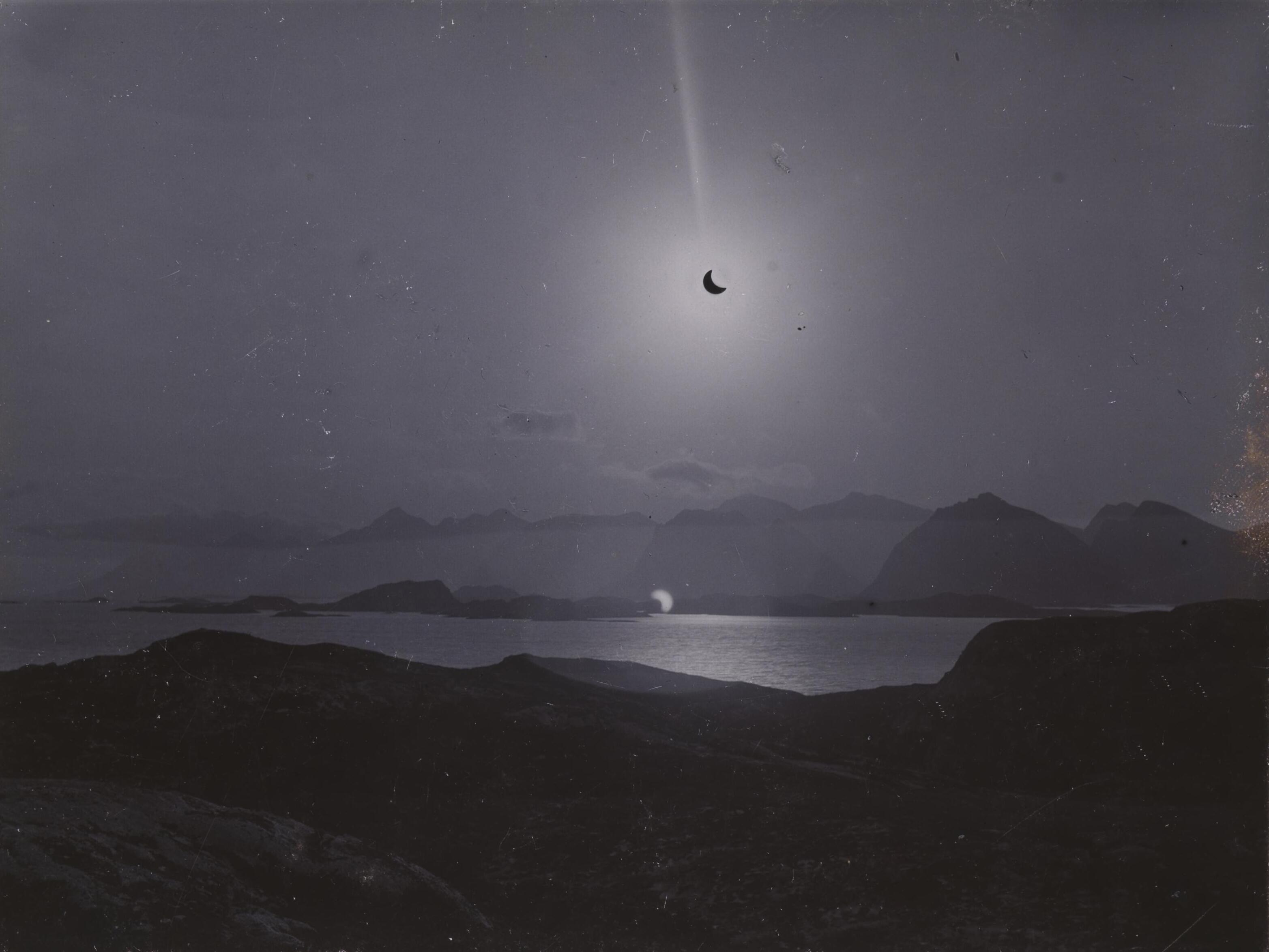
- Partial eclipse photographed in Kabelvåg, Norway, by Celia Hammer

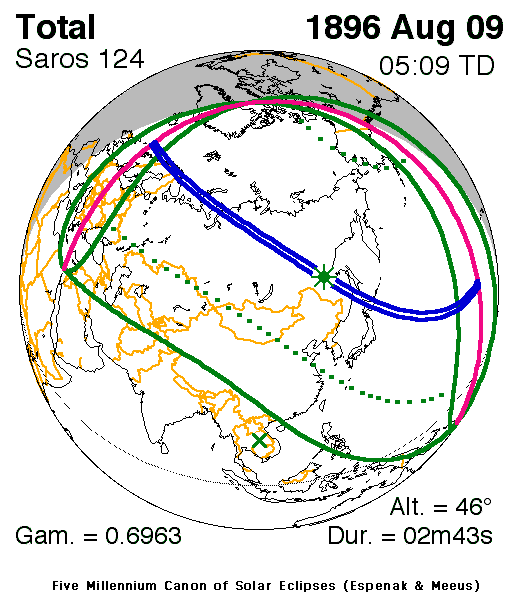
- Map
- Gamma: 0.6964
- Magnitude: 1.0392

Maximum eclipse
- Duration: 163 s (2 min 43 s)
- Coordinates: 54.4°N 132.2°E
- Max. width of band: 182 km (113 mi)

Times (UTC)
- Greatest eclipse: 5:09:00

References
- Saros: 124 (48 of 73)
- Catalog # (SE5000): 9272

A total solar eclipse occurred at the Moon's descending node of orbit on Sunday, August 9, 1896, with a magnitude of 1.0392. A solar eclipse occurs when the Moon passes between Earth and the Sun, thereby totally or partly obscuring the image of the Sun for a viewer on Earth. A total solar eclipse occurs when the Moon's apparent diameter is larger than the Sun's, blocking all direct sunlight, turning day into darkness. Totality occurs in a narrow path across Earth's surface, with the partial solar eclipse visible over a surrounding region thousands of kilometres wide. Occurring about 2.5 days before perigee (on August 11, 1896, at 18:30 UTC), the Moon's apparent diameter was larger.

The path of totality was visible from parts of northern Norway, northern Sweden, the Russian Empire, and the Empire of Japan. A partial solar eclipse was also visible for much of Europe, Central Asia, East Asia, Northeast Asia, Alaska, and Greenland.

This event was the subject of the first organized eclipse expedition by the British Astronomical Association. A group of 165 amateur and professional astronomers sailed from Tilbury, England on July 25, heading toward Vadsø, Norway. This expedition failed to produce any usable results as they were frustrated by the weather conditions at the time of the eclipse. However, a smaller expedition to Novaya Zemlya on Sir George Baden-Powell's yacht Otario met with success.

== Gallery ==
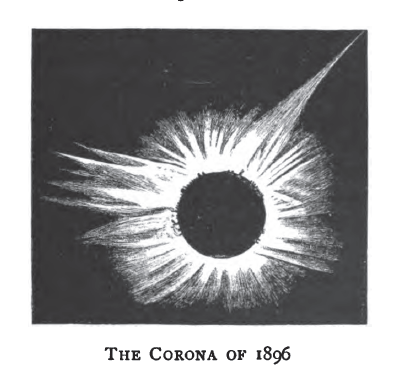

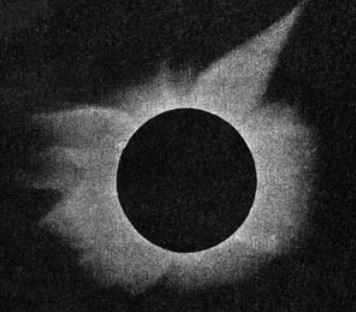
The eclipse from Novaya Zemlya, Russia

== Eclipse details ==
Shown below are two tables displaying details about this particular solar eclipse. The first table outlines times at which the Moon's penumbra or umbra attains the specific parameter, and the second table describes various other parameters pertaining to this eclipse.

August 9, 1896 Solar Eclipse Times
Event	Time (UTC)
First Penumbral External Contact	1896 August 9 at 02:43:20.8 UTC
First Umbral External Contact	1896 August 9 at 03:52:06.8 UTC
First Central Line	1896 August 9 at 03:53:08.3 UTC
First Umbral Internal Contact	1896 August 9 at 03:54:10.1 UTC
Equatorial Conjunction	1896 August 9 at 04:37:13.0 UTC
Ecliptic Conjunction	1896 August 9 at 05:01:41.9 UTC
Greatest Duration	1896 August 9 at 05:08:37.2 UTC
Greatest Eclipse	1896 August 9 at 05:09:00.1 UTC
Last Umbral Internal Contact	1896 August 9 at 06:24:07.8 UTC
Last Central Line	1896 August 9 at 06:25:11.8 UTC
Last Umbral External Contact	1896 August 9 at 06:26:15.3 UTC
Last Penumbral External Contact	1896 August 9 at 07:34:47.9 UTC

August 9, 1896 Solar Eclipse Parameters
Parameter	Value
Eclipse Magnitude	1.03918
Eclipse Obscuration	1.07989
Gamma	0.69635
Sun Right Ascension	09h18m02.6s
Sun Declination	+15°44'00.4"
Sun Semi-Diameter	15'46.9"
Sun Equatorial Horizontal Parallax	08.7"
Moon Right Ascension	09h19m10.6s
Moon Declination	+16°21'57.5"
Moon Semi-Diameter	16'12.5"
Moon Equatorial Horizontal Parallax	0°59'29.1"
ΔT	-5.8 s

== Eclipse season ==
This eclipse is part of an eclipse season, a period, roughly every six months, when eclipses occur. Only two (or occasionally three) eclipse seasons occur each year, and each season lasts about 35 days and repeats just short of six months (173 days) later; thus two full eclipse seasons always occur each year. Either two or three eclipses happen each eclipse season. In the sequence below, each eclipse is separated by a fortnight.

Eclipse season of August 1896
August 9 Descending node (new moon)	August 23 Ascending node (full moon)
Total solar eclipse Solar Saros 124	Partial lunar eclipse Lunar Saros 136

== Related eclipses ==
=== Eclipses in 1896 ===
- [Solar eclipse of February 13, 1896.
- February 1896 lunar eclipse.
- A total solar eclipse on August 9.
- August 1896 lunar eclipse.

=== Metonic ===
- Preceded by: Solar eclipse of October 20, 1892
- Followed by: Solar eclipse of May 28, 1900

=== Tzolkinex ===
- Preceded by: Solar eclipse of June 28, 1889
- Followed by: Solar eclipse of September 21, 1903

=== Half-Saros ===
- Preceded by: Lunar eclipse of August 3, 1887
- Followed by: Lunar eclipse of August 15, 1905

=== Tritos ===
- Preceded by: Solar eclipse of September 8, 1885
- Followed by: Solar eclipse of July 10, 1907

=== Solar Saros 124 ===
- Preceded by: Solar eclipse of July 29, 1878
- Followed by: Solar eclipse of August 21, 1914

=== Inex ===
- Preceded by: Solar eclipse of August 29, 1867
- Followed by: Solar eclipse of July 20, 1925

=== Triad ===
- Preceded by: Solar eclipse of October 9, 1809
- Followed by: Solar eclipse of June 11, 1983

=== Solar eclipses of 1895–1899 ===
This eclipse is a member of a semester series. An eclipse in a semester series of solar eclipses repeats approximately every 177 days and 4 hours (a semester) at alternating nodes of the Moon's orbit.

The partial solar eclipses on March 26, 1895 and September 18, 1895 occur in the previous lunar year eclipse set, and the partial solar eclipse on December 13, 1898 occurs in the next lunar year eclipse set.

Solar eclipse series sets from 1895 to 1899
Descending node			Ascending node		
Saros	Map	Gamma	Saros	Map	Gamma
114	August 20, 1895 Partial	1.3911	119	February 13, 1896 Annular	−0.9220
124	August 9, 1896 Total	0.6964	129	February 1, 1897 Annular	−0.1903
134	July 29, 1897 Annular	−0.0640	139	January 22, 1898 Total	0.5079
144	July 18, 1898 Annular	−0.8546	149	January 11, 1899 Partial	1.1558

=== Saros 124 ===
This eclipse is a part of Saros series 124, repeating every 18 years, 11 days, and containing 73 events. The series started with a partial solar eclipse on March 6, 1049. It contains total eclipses from June 12, 1211 through September 22, 1968, and a hybrid eclipse on October 3, 1986. There are no annular eclipses in this set. The series ends at member 73 as a partial eclipse on May 11, 2347. Its eclipses are tabulated in three columns; every third eclipse in the same column is one exeligmos apart, so they all cast shadows over approximately the same parts of the Earth.

The longest duration of totality was produced by member 39 at 5 minutes, 46 seconds on May 3, 1734. All eclipses in this series occur at the Moon’s descending node of orbit.

Series members 43–64 occur between 1801 and 2200:
43	44	45
June 16, 1806	June 26, 1824	July 8, 1842
46	47	48
July 18, 1860	July 29, 1878	August 9, 1896
49	50	51
August 21, 1914	August 31, 1932	September 12, 1950
52	53	54
September 22, 1968	October 3, 1986	October 14, 2004
55	56	57
October 25, 2022	November 4, 2040	November 16, 2058
58	59	60
November 26, 2076	December 7, 2094	December 19, 2112
61	62	63
December 30, 2130	January 9, 2149	January 21, 2167
64
January 31, 2185

=== Metonic series ===
The metonic series repeats eclipses every 19 years (6939.69 days), lasting about 5 cycles. Eclipses occur in nearly the same calendar date. In addition, the octon subseries repeats 1/5 of that or every 3.8 years (1387.94 days). All eclipses in this table occur at the Moon's descending node.

22 eclipse events between March 16, 1866 and August 9, 1953
March 16–17	January 1–3	October 20–22	August 9–10	May 27–29
108	110	112	114	116
March 16, 1866			August 9, 1877	May 27, 1881
118	120	122	124	126
March 16, 1885	January 1, 1889	October 20, 1892	August 9, 1896	May 28, 1900
128	130	132	134	136
March 17, 1904	January 3, 1908	October 22, 1911	August 10, 1915	May 29, 1919
138	140	142	144	146
March 17, 1923	January 3, 1927	October 21, 1930	August 10, 1934	May 29, 1938
148	150	152	154	
March 16, 1942	January 3, 1946	October 21, 1949	August 9, 1953	

=== Tritos series ===
This eclipse is a part of a tritos cycle, repeating at alternating nodes every 135 synodic months (≈ 3986.63 days, or 11 years minus 1 month). Their appearance and longitude are irregular due to a lack of synchronization with the anomalistic month (period of perigee), but groupings of 3 tritos cycles (≈ 33 years minus 3 months) come close (≈ 434.044 anomalistic months), so eclipses are similar in these groupings.

Series members between 1801 and 2200
April 14, 1809 (Saros 116)	March 14, 1820 (Saros 117)	February 12, 1831 (Saros 118)	January 11, 1842 (Saros 119)	December 11, 1852 (Saros 120)
November 11, 1863 (Saros 121)	October 10, 1874 (Saros 122)	September 8, 1885 (Saros 123)	August 9, 1896 (Saros 124)	July 10, 1907 (Saros 125)
June 8, 1918 (Saros 126)	May 9, 1929 (Saros 127)	April 7, 1940 (Saros 128)	March 7, 1951 (Saros 129)	February 5, 1962 (Saros 130)
January 4, 1973 (Saros 131)	December 4, 1983 (Saros 132)	November 3, 1994 (Saros 133)	October 3, 2005 (Saros 134)	September 1, 2016 (Saros 135)
August 2, 2027 (Saros 136)	July 2, 2038 (Saros 137)	May 31, 2049 (Saros 138)	April 30, 2060 (Saros 139)	March 31, 2071 (Saros 140)
February 27, 2082 (Saros 141)	January 27, 2093 (Saros 142)	December 29, 2103 (Saros 143)	November 27, 2114 (Saros 144)	October 26, 2125 (Saros 145)
September 26, 2136 (Saros 146)	August 26, 2147 (Saros 147)	July 25, 2158 (Saros 148)	June 25, 2169 (Saros 149)	May 24, 2180 (Saros 150)
April 23, 2191 (Saros 151)

=== Inex series ===
This eclipse is a part of the long period inex cycle, repeating at alternating nodes, every 358 synodic months (≈ 10,571.95 days, or 29 years minus 20 days). Their appearance and longitude are irregular due to a lack of synchronization with the anomalistic month (period of perigee). However, groupings of 3 inex cycles (≈ 87 years minus 2 months) comes close (≈ 1,151.02 anomalistic months), so eclipses are similar in these groupings.

Series members between 1801 and 2200
October 9, 1809 (Saros 121)	September 18, 1838 (Saros 122)	August 29, 1867 (Saros 123)
August 9, 1896 (Saros 124)	July 20, 1925 (Saros 125)	June 30, 1954 (Saros 126)
June 11, 1983 (Saros 127)	May 20, 2012 (Saros 128)	April 30, 2041 (Saros 129)
April 11, 2070 (Saros 130)	March 21, 2099 (Saros 131)	March 1, 2128 (Saros 132)
February 9, 2157 (Saros 133)	January 20, 2186 (Saros 134)	
