= May 1453 lunar eclipse =

Eclipse seen during the Fall of Constantinople

- Partial eclipse
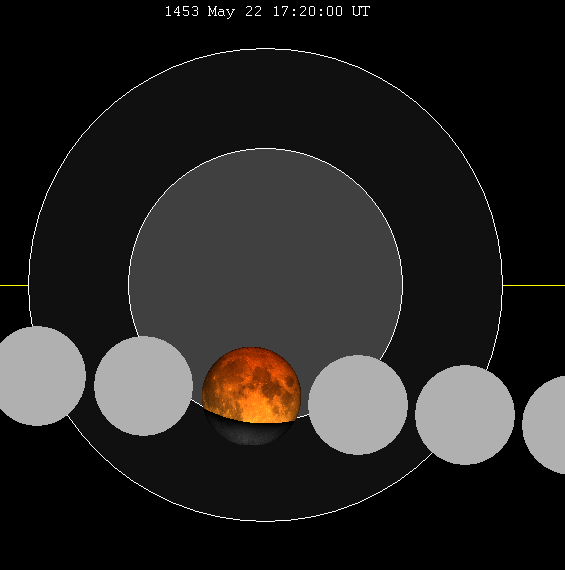
- Date: 22 May 1453
- Gamma: −0.6067
- Magnitude: 0.7446
- Saros cycle: 102 (56 of 84)
- Partiality: 178 minutes, 43 seconds
- Penumbral: 315 minutes, 27 seconds
Contacts (UTC)
- P1: 14:38:07
- U1: 15:46:39
- Greatest: 17:15:49
- U4: 18:44:54
- P4: 19:53:34

A partial lunar eclipse occurred at the Moon's ascending node on 22 May 1453, with an umbral magnitude of 0.7446. A lunar eclipse occurs when the Moon moves into the Earth's shadow, causing the Moon to be darkened. A partial lunar eclipse occurs when only part of the Moon is in the Earth's umbra, while the rest is in the Earth's penumbra. Unlike a solar eclipse, which can only be viewed from a relatively small area of the world, a lunar eclipse may be viewed from anywhere on the night side of Earth.

It was a member of Lunar Saros 102.

== Observations ==
The eclipse was seen during the Fall of Constantinople (the capture of the capital of the Byzantine Empire), during the siege that lasted from Thursday, 5 April 1453 until Tuesday, 29 May 1453, after which the city fell to the Ottomans. The lunar eclipse was considered to be fulfilling a prophecy for the city's demise, which says a blood moon took place during the eclipse.

== Eclipse details ==
Below is a chart of various details and parameters of this eclipse.

22 May 1453 eclipse parameters
Parameter	Value
Penumbral magnitude	1.74506
Umbral magnitude	0.74464
Gamma	-0.60666
Sun right ascension	04^{h} 32^{m} 35.6^{s}
Sun declination	+21° 59′ 11.9″
Sun semi-diameter	15'45.1"
Sun equatorial horizontal parallax	08.7"
Moon right ascension	16^{h} 32^{m} 27.9^{s}
Moon declination	−22° 34′ 12.3″
Moon semi-diameter	15'44.7"
Moon equatorial horizontal parallax	0°57'46.9"
ΔT	247.0 s

== Visibility ==
The eclipse was completely visible over Asia and Oceania, seen rising over Africa and Europe and setting over the Pacific Ocean. The eclipse occurred 5.2 days after perigee.

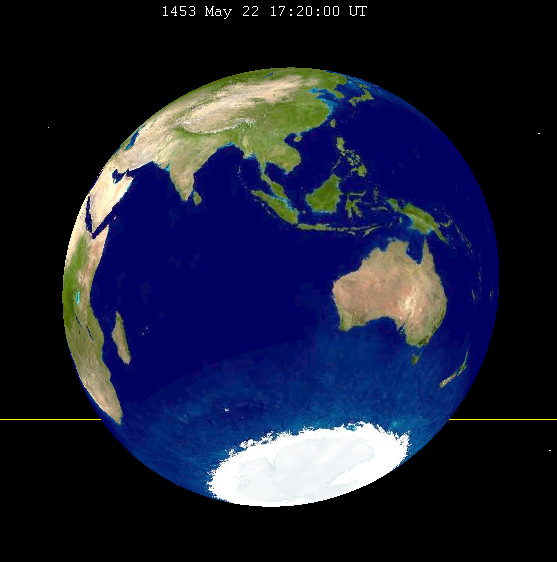

== Eclipse season ==
This eclipse is part of an eclipse season, a period, roughly every six months, when eclipses occur. Only two (or occasionally three) eclipse seasons occur each year, and each season lasts about 35 days and repeats just short of six months (173 days) later; thus two full eclipse seasons always occur each year. Either two or three eclipses happen each eclipse season. In the sequence below, each eclipse is separated by a fortnight.

Eclipse season of May–June 1453
May 22 Ascending node (full moon)	June 7 Descending node (new moon)
Partial lunar eclipse Lunar Saros 102	Total solar eclipse Solar Saros 128

== Related eclipses ==
=== Eclipses in 1453 ===
- A partial lunar eclipse on 22 May.
- A total solar eclipse on 7 June.
- A total lunar eclipse on 16 November.
- An annular eclipse on 30 November.

=== Metonic ===
- Preceded by: Lunar eclipse of 23 May 1434
- Followed by: Lunar eclipse of 22 May 1472

=== Tzolkinex ===
- Preceded by: Lunar eclipse of 26 April 1446
- Followed by: Lunar eclipse of 18 July 1460

=== Half-Saros ===
- Preceded by: Solar eclipse of 17 May 1444
- Followed by: Solar eclipse of 29 May 1462

=== Tritos ===
- Preceded by: Lunar eclipse of 13 June 1442
- Followed by: Lunar eclipse of 22 April 1464

=== Saros ===
- Preceded by: Lunar eclipse of 12 May 1435
- Followed by: Lunar eclipse of 3 June 1471

=== Inex ===
- Preceded by: Lunar eclipse of 12 June 1424
- Followed by: Lunar eclipse of 3 May 1482

=== Triad ===
- Preceded by: Lunar eclipse of 22 July 1366
- Followed by: Lunar eclipse of 22 March 1540 (Note: Calculated based on numbers from and eclipses from)

=== Semester series ===
This eclipse is a member of a semester series. Eclipses in a semester series of lunar eclipses repeat approximately every 177 days and 4 hours, termed a semester, at alternating nodes of the Moon's orbit.

Lunar eclipse series sets from 1452 to 1455
Ascending node				Descending node			
Saros	Date Viewing	Type Chart	Gamma	Saros	Date	Type	Gamma
92	1452 Jun 02	Penumbral	-1.42448	97	1452 Nov 27	Penumbral	1.03115
102	1453 May 22	Partial	-0.60666	107	1453 Nov 16	Total	0.36612
112	1454 May 12	Total	0.16833	117	1454 Nov 05	Total	-0.33005
122	1455 May 01	Partial	0.88982	127	1455 Oct 25	Penumbral	-1.00939

=== Saros 102 ===
This eclipse was a member of Lunar Saros 102, repeating every 18 years 11 days 8 hours at the ascending node of the Moon's orbit, and contained 84 events. The series began with a penumbral eclipse on 5 October 461. It contained partial eclipses from 20 May 840 to 13 July 930, then total eclipses from 23 July 948 to 20 April 1399, and a second set of partial eclipses from 1 May 1417 to 16 July 1543. The final event of the series was a penumbral eclipse on 4 April 1958. The longest duration of totality was produced by member 36 at 104 minutes, 43 seconds, on October 7, 1074.

Greatest	First			
The greatest eclipse of the series occurred on 1092 Oct 18, lasting 104 minutes, 43 seconds.	Penumbral	Partial	Total	Central
The greatest eclipse of the series occurred on 1092 Oct 18, lasting 104 minutes, 43 seconds.	0461 Oct 05	0840 May 20	0948 Jul 23	0984 Aug 14
The greatest eclipse of the series occurred on 1092 Oct 18, lasting 104 minutes, 43 seconds.	Last			
The greatest eclipse of the series occurred on 1092 Oct 18, lasting 104 minutes, 43 seconds.	Central	Total	Partial	Penumbral
The greatest eclipse of the series occurred on 1092 Oct 18, lasting 104 minutes, 43 seconds.	1345 Mar 18	1399 Apr 20	1543 Jul 16	1958 Apr 04

=== Half-Saros cycle ===
A lunar eclipse will always be preceded and followed by two solar eclipses by a period of 9 years and 5.5 days, a half-saros, or sar. This eclipse is related to two hybrid solar eclipses of Solar Saros 109.

17 May 1444	29 May 1462
