= Solar eclipse of April 29, 1976 =

20th-century annular solar eclipse

- Annular eclipse
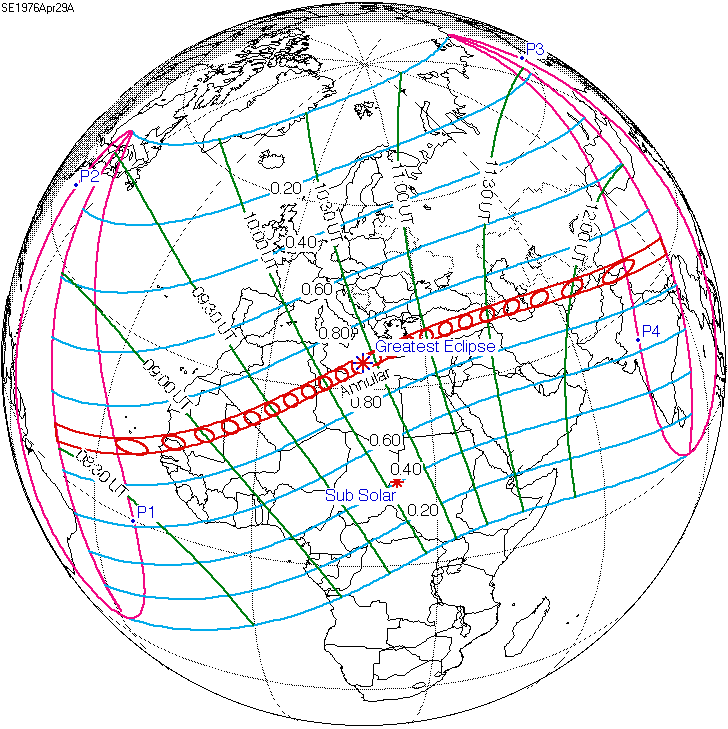
- Map
- Gamma: 0.3378
- Magnitude: 0.9421

Maximum eclipse
- Duration: 401 s (6 min 41 s)
- Coordinates: 34°N 18.3°E
- Max. width of band: 227 km (141 mi)

Times (UTC)
- Greatest eclipse: 10:24:18

References
- Saros: 128 (56 of 73)
- Catalog # (SE5000): 9456

An annular solar eclipse occurred at the Moon's descending node of orbit on Thursday, April 29, 1976, with a magnitude of 0.9421. A solar eclipse occurs when the Moon passes between Earth and the Sun, thereby totally or partly obscuring the image of the Sun for a viewer on Earth. An annular solar eclipse occurs when the Moon's apparent diameter is smaller than the Sun's, blocking most of the Sun's light and causing the Sun to look like an annulus (ring). An annular eclipse appears as a partial eclipse over a region of the Earth thousands of kilometres wide. Occurring about 1.9 days after apogee (on April 27, 1976, at 13:30 UTC), the Moon's apparent diameter was smaller.

Annularity was visible from North Africa, Greece, Turkey, Middle East, central Asia, India, China. 5 of the 14 eight-thousanders in Pakistan and China—Nanga Parbat, K2, Broad Peak, Gasherbrum II and Gasherbrum I, lie in the path of annularity. A partial eclipse was visible for parts of the Canadian Maritimes, North Africa, Central Africa, Europe, the Middle East, Central Asia, and South Asia.

Note that the central line of this annular solar eclipse followed a path extremely similar to that of the total eclipse that will occur 112 years later on April 21, 2088.

== Observation ==
The Institute of Physics and Institute of Mathematics of the Chinese Academy of Sciences and the Xinjiang Earthquake Team conducted observations of gravitational effects using gravimeters, inclinometers, pendulum clocks and seismometers in southwestern Hotan County, Hotan Prefecture, Xinjiang near the Karakoram Pass at an altitude of 5,500 metres (18,000 ft). Results showed that the gravitational acceleration had no obvious effect within the accuracy of the instruments. No inclination was recorded on the photosensitive paper of the inclinometer due to the width of its lines. Three inclinations were pen-recorded, whose time and direction were clearly related to that of the eclipse. Due to the difficult conditions with the high altitude, the observation team was unable to obtain more comparative data.

== Eclipse details ==
Shown below are two tables displaying details about this particular solar eclipse. The first table outlines times at which the Moon's penumbra or umbra attains the specific parameter, and the second table describes various other parameters pertaining to this eclipse.

April 29, 1976 Solar Eclipse Times
| Event | Time (UTC) |
|---|---|
| First Penumbral External Contact | 1976 April 29 at 07:23:05.3 UTC |
| First Umbral External Contact | 1976 April 29 at 08:30:13.1 UTC |
| First Central Line | 1976 April 29 at 08:32:52.8 UTC |
| First Umbral Internal Contact | 1976 April 29 at 08:35:32.9 UTC |
| First Penumbral Internal Contact | 1976 April 29 at 09:52:32.8 UTC |
| Ecliptic Conjunction | 1976 April 29 at 10:20:15.6 UTC |
| Greatest Eclipse | 1976 April 29 at 10:24:17.7 UTC |
| Greatest Duration | 1976 April 29 at 10:30:53.5 UTC |
| Equatorial Conjunction | 1976 April 29 at 10:33:23.0 UTC |
| Last Penumbral Internal Contact | 1976 April 29 at 10:55:47.8 UTC |
| Last Umbral Internal Contact | 1976 April 29 at 12:12:56.6 UTC |
| Last Central Line | 1976 April 29 at 12:15:35.7 UTC |
| Last Umbral External Contact | 1976 April 29 at 12:18:14.3 UTC |
| Last Penumbral External Contact | 1976 April 29 at 13:25:23.3 UTC |

April 29, 1976 Solar Eclipse Parameters
| Parameter | Value |
|---|---|
| Eclipse Magnitude | 0.94208 |
| Eclipse Obscuration | 0.88752 |
| Gamma | 0.33783 |
| Sun Right Ascension | 02h27m19.6s |
| Sun Declination | +14°34'10.4" |
| Sun Semi-Diameter | 15'52.7" |
| Sun Equatorial Horizontal Parallax | 08.7" |
| Moon Right Ascension | 02h27m02.8s |
| Moon Declination | +14°51'57.3" |
| Moon Semi-Diameter | 14'44.9" |
| Moon Equatorial Horizontal Parallax | 0°54'07.6" |
| ΔT | 46.8 s |

== Eclipse season ==
This eclipse is part of an eclipse season, a period, roughly every six months, when eclipses occur. Only two (or occasionally three) eclipse seasons occur each year, and each season lasts about 35 days and repeats just short of six months (173 days) later; thus two full eclipse seasons always occur each year. Either two or three eclipses happen each eclipse season. In the sequence below, each eclipse is separated by a fortnight.

Eclipse season of April–May 1976
| April 29 Descending node (new moon) | May 13 Ascending node (full moon) |
|---|---|
| Annular solar eclipse Solar Saros 128 | Partial lunar eclipse Lunar Saros 140 |

== Related eclipses ==
=== Eclipses in 1976 ===
- An annular solar eclipse on April 29.
- A partial lunar eclipse on May 13.
- A total solar eclipse on October 23.
- A penumbral lunar eclipse on November 6.

=== Metonic ===
- Preceded by: Solar eclipse of July 10, 1972
- Followed by: Solar eclipse of February 16, 1980

=== Tzolkinex ===
- Preceded by: Solar eclipse of March 18, 1969
- Followed by: Solar eclipse of June 11, 1983

=== Half-Saros ===
- Preceded by: Lunar eclipse of April 24, 1967
- Followed by: Lunar eclipse of May 4, 1985

=== Tritos ===
- Preceded by: Solar eclipse of May 30, 1965
- Followed by: Solar eclipse of March 29, 1987

=== Solar Saros 128 ===
- Preceded by: Solar eclipse of April 19, 1958
- Followed by: Solar eclipse of May 10, 1994

=== Inex ===
- Preceded by: Solar eclipse of May 20, 1947
- Followed by: Solar eclipse of April 8, 2005

=== Triad ===
- Preceded by: Solar eclipse of June 28, 1889
- Followed by: Solar eclipse of February 28, 2063

=== Solar eclipses of 1975–1978 ===
This eclipse is a member of a semester series. An eclipse in a semester series of solar eclipses repeats approximately every 177 days and 4 hours (a semester) at alternating nodes of the Moon's orbit.

Solar eclipse series sets from 1975 to 1978
| Descending node | | | Ascending node | | |
| Saros | Map | Gamma | Saros | Map | Gamma |
| 118 | May 11, 1975 Partial | 1.0647 | 123 | November 3, 1975 Partial | −1.0248 |
| 128 | April 29, 1976 Annular | 0.3378 | 133 | October 23, 1976 Total | −0.327 |
| 138 | April 18, 1977 Annular | −0.399 | 143 | October 12, 1977 Total | 0.3836 |
| 148 | April 7, 1978 Partial | −1.1081 | 153 | October 2, 1978 Partial | 1.1616 |

=== Saros 128 ===
This eclipse is a part of Saros series 128, repeating every 18 years, 11 days, and containing 73 events. The series started with a partial solar eclipse on August 29, 984 AD. It contains total eclipses from May 16, 1417 through June 18, 1471; hybrid eclipses from June 28, 1489 through July 31, 1543; and annular eclipses from August 11, 1561 through July 25, 2120. The series ends at member 73 as a partial eclipse on November 1, 2282. Its eclipses are tabulated in three columns; every third eclipse in the same column is one exeligmos apart, so they all cast shadows over approximately the same parts of the Earth.

The longest duration of totality was produced by member 27 at 1 minutes, 45 seconds on June 7, 1453, and the longest duration of annularity was produced by member 48 at 8 minutes, 35 seconds on February 1, 1832. All eclipses in this series occur at the Moon’s descending node of orbit.

Series members 47–68 occur between 1801 and 2200:
| 47 | 48 | 49 |
|---|---|---|
| January 21, 1814 | February 1, 1832 | February 12, 1850 |
| 50 | 51 | 52 |
| February 23, 1868 | March 5, 1886 | March 17, 1904 |
| 53 | 54 | 55 |
| March 28, 1922 | April 7, 1940 | April 19, 1958 |
| 56 | 57 | 58 |
| April 29, 1976 | May 10, 1994 | May 20, 2012 |
| 59 | 60 | 61 |
| June 1, 2030 | June 11, 2048 | June 22, 2066 |
| 62 | 63 | 64 |
| July 3, 2084 | July 15, 2102 | July 25, 2120 |
| 65 | 66 | 67 |
| August 5, 2138 | August 16, 2156 | August 27, 2174 |
68
September 6, 2192

=== Metonic series ===
The metonic series repeats eclipses every 19 years (6939.69 days), lasting about 5 cycles. Eclipses occur in nearly the same calendar date. In addition, the octon subseries repeats 1/5 of that or every 3.8 years (1387.94 days). All eclipses in this table occur at the Moon's descending node.

21 eclipse events between July 11, 1953 and July 11, 2029
| July 10–11 | April 29–30 | February 15–16 | December 4 | September 21–23 |
| 116 | 118 | 120 | 122 | 124 |
|---|---|---|---|---|
| July 11, 1953 | April 30, 1957 | February 15, 1961 | December 4, 1964 | September 22, 1968 |
| 126 | 128 | 130 | 132 | 134 |
| July 10, 1972 | April 29, 1976 | February 16, 1980 | December 4, 1983 | September 23, 1987 |
| 136 | 138 | 140 | 142 | 144 |
| July 11, 1991 | April 29, 1995 | February 16, 1999 | December 4, 2002 | September 22, 2006 |
| 146 | 148 | 150 | 152 | 154 |
| July 11, 2010 | April 29, 2014 | February 15, 2018 | December 4, 2021 | September 21, 2025 |
156
July 11, 2029

=== Tritos series ===
This eclipse is a part of a tritos cycle, repeating at alternating nodes every 135 synodic months (≈ 3986.63 days, or 11 years minus 1 month). Their appearance and longitude are irregular due to a lack of synchronization with the anomalistic month (period of perigee), but groupings of 3 tritos cycles (≈ 33 years minus 3 months) come close (≈ 434.044 anomalistic months), so eclipses are similar in these groupings.

Series members between 1801 and 2200
| September 8, 1801 (Saros 112) | August 7, 1812 (Saros 113) | July 8, 1823 (Saros 114) | June 7, 1834 (Saros 115) | May 6, 1845 (Saros 116) |
| April 5, 1856 (Saros 117) | March 6, 1867 (Saros 118) | February 2, 1878 (Saros 119) | January 1, 1889 (Saros 120) | December 3, 1899 (Saros 121) |
| November 2, 1910 (Saros 122) | October 1, 1921 (Saros 123) | August 31, 1932 (Saros 124) | August 1, 1943 (Saros 125) | June 30, 1954 (Saros 126) |
| May 30, 1965 (Saros 127) | April 29, 1976 (Saros 128) | March 29, 1987 (Saros 129) | February 26, 1998 (Saros 130) | January 26, 2009 (Saros 131) |
| December 26, 2019 (Saros 132) | November 25, 2030 (Saros 133) | October 25, 2041 (Saros 134) | September 22, 2052 (Saros 135) | August 24, 2063 (Saros 136) |
| July 24, 2074 (Saros 137) | June 22, 2085 (Saros 138) | May 22, 2096 (Saros 139) | April 23, 2107 (Saros 140) | March 22, 2118 (Saros 141) |
| February 18, 2129 (Saros 142) | January 20, 2140 (Saros 143) | December 19, 2150 (Saros 144) | November 17, 2161 (Saros 145) | October 17, 2172 (Saros 146) |
| September 16, 2183 (Saros 147) | August 16, 2194 (Saros 148) | | | |

=== Inex series ===
This eclipse is a part of the long period inex cycle, repeating at alternating nodes, every 358 synodic months (≈ 10,571.95 days, or 29 years minus 20 days). Their appearance and longitude are irregular due to a lack of synchronization with the anomalistic month (period of perigee). However, groupings of 3 inex cycles (≈ 87 years minus 2 months) comes close (≈ 1,151.02 anomalistic months), so eclipses are similar in these groupings.

Series members between 1801 and 2200
| August 28, 1802 (Saros 122) | August 7, 1831 (Saros 123) | July 18, 1860 (Saros 124) |
| June 28, 1889 (Saros 125) | June 8, 1918 (Saros 126) | May 20, 1947 (Saros 127) |
| April 29, 1976 (Saros 128) | April 8, 2005 (Saros 129) | March 20, 2034 (Saros 130) |
| February 28, 2063 (Saros 131) | February 7, 2092 (Saros 132) | January 19, 2121 (Saros 133) |
| December 30, 2149 (Saros 134) | December 9, 2178 (Saros 135) | |
