= Solar eclipse of May 20, 2012 =

21st-century annular solar eclipse

- Annular eclipse
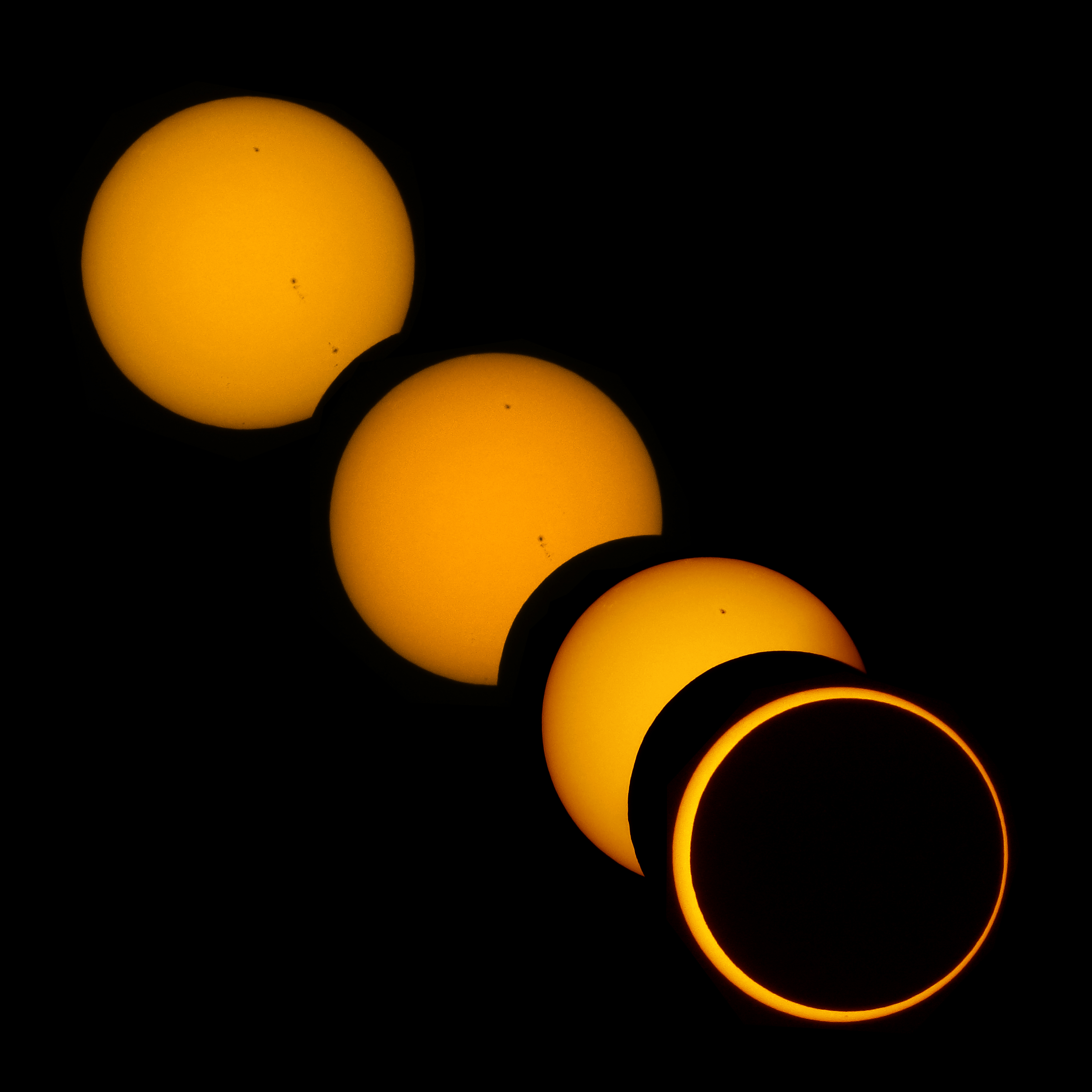
- Composite image taken from Red Bluff, California

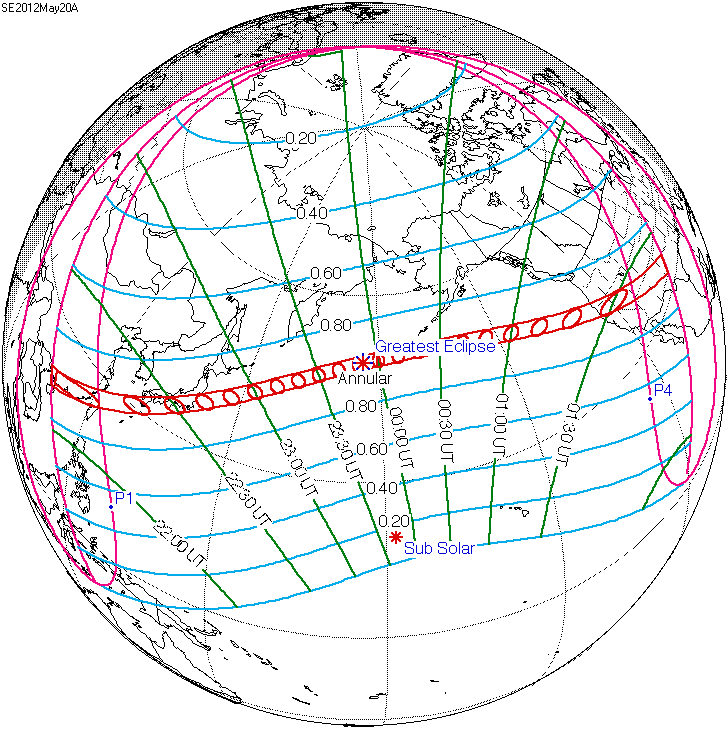
- Map
- Gamma: 0.4828
- Magnitude: 0.9439

Maximum eclipse
- Duration: 346 s (5 min 46 s)
- Coordinates: 49.1°N 176.3°E
- Max. width of band: 237 km (147 mi)

Times (UTC)
- (P1) Partial begin: 20:56:07
- (U1) Total begin: 22:06:17
- Greatest eclipse: 23:53:54
- (U4) Total end: 1:39:11
- (P4) Partial end: 2:49:21

References
- Saros: 128 (58 of 73)
- Catalog # (SE5000): 9535

An annular solar eclipse occurred at the Moon's descending node of orbit between Sunday, May 20 and Monday, May 21, 2012, with a magnitude of 0.9439. A solar eclipse occurs when the Moon passes between Earth and the Sun, thereby totally or partly obscuring the image of the Sun for a viewer on Earth. An annular solar eclipse occurs when the Moon's apparent diameter is smaller than the Sun's, blocking most of the Sun's light and causing the Sun to look like an annulus (ring). An annular eclipse appears as a partial eclipse over a region of the Earth thousands of kilometres or miles wide. Occurring about 1.3 days after apogee (on May 19, 2012, at 17:10 UTC), the Moon's apparent diameter was smaller.

The annular eclipse was the first visible from the contiguous United States since the solar eclipse of May 10, 1994 (Saros 128), and the first in Asia since the solar eclipse of January 15, 2010 (Saros 141). The path of the eclipse's antumbra included heavily populated regions of China and Japan, and an estimated 100 million people in those areas were capable of viewing annularity. In the western United States, its path included 8 states, and an estimated 6 million people were capable of viewing annularity.

The eclipse was visible in a band spanning through East Asia, the Pacific Ocean, and North America. As a partial solar eclipse, it was visible from Greenland to Hawaii, and from eastern Indonesia at sunrise to western North America at sunset.

== Visibility and viewing ==
Animation of the eclipse

The antumbra had a magnitude of .94, stretched 236 kilometres (147 miles) wide, and traveled eastbound at an average rate of 1.00 kilometre (0.62 miles) per second, remaining north of the equator throughout the event. The longest duration of annularity was 5 minutes and 46 seconds, occurring just south of the Aleutian Islands. The eclipse began on a Monday and ended on the previous Sunday, as it crossed the International Date Line.

=== Asia ===
The annular eclipse commenced over the Chinese province of Guangxi at sunrise, at 6:06 a.m. China Standard Time. Travelling northeast, the antumbra of the eclipse approached and passed over the cities of Macau, Hong Kong, Guangzhou, and Xiamen, reaching Taipei by 6:10 a.m NST. After crossing the East China Sea, it passed over much of eastern Japan, including Osaka and Tokyo at 7:28 a.m and 7:32 a.m JST respectively, before entering the Pacific Ocean. The penumbra of the eclipse was visible throughout Eastern Asia and various islands in the Pacific Ocean until noon.

The path of the antumbra over highly populated areas allowed at least an estimated 100 million people to view annularity. Because the eclipse took place during the summer monsoon season in Southeast Asia, viewing conditions were not ideal in some areas, including Hong Kong.

=== North America ===
After traveling approximately 4,000 miles (6,500 kilometers) across the Pacific Ocean, the antumbra entered North America between the coastlines of Oregon and California, reaching the coastal city of Eureka, California at 6:25 p.m PDT. After passing over Medford, Oregon and Redding, California, it had reached Reno, Nevada by 6:28 p.m PDT. The eclipse continued to travel southeast, passing 30 miles (48 km) north of Las Vegas, Nevada, over St. George, Utah, and reaching the Grand Canyon by approximately 6:33 p.m MST. After passing over Albuquerque, New Mexico and Lubbock, Texas, the eclipse terminated above central Texas at sunset, 8:38 p.m. CST. An estimated 6.6 million people lived under the path of the antumbra. The penumbra was visible throughout most of North America, including the islands of Hawaii.

== Eclipse timing ==
=== Places experiencing annular eclipse ===
Solar Eclipse of May 20, 2012 (Local Times)
Country or territory	City or place	Start of partial eclipse	Start of annular eclipse	Maximum eclipse	End of annular eclipse	End of partial eclipse	Duration of annularity (min:s)	Duration of eclipse (hr:min)	Maximum magnitude
Hong Kong	Hong Kong (Note: The times listed for this location occur on May 21, 2012, local time.)	05:41:16 (sunrise)	06:06:48	06:08:31	06:10:15	07:16:23	3:27	1:35	87.03%
Hong Kong	Kowloon	05:40:56 (sunrise)	06:06:49	06:08:32	06:10:15	07:16:26	3:26	1:36	87.04%
Macau	Macau	05:44:00 (sunrise)	06:06:41	06:08:34	06:10:26	07:16:04	3:45	1:32	87.01%
China	Shenzhen	05:41:20 (sunrise)	06:06:50	06:08:50	06:10:49	07:16:41	3:59	1:35	87.03%
China	Shantou	05:29:24 (sunrise)	06:07:29	06:09:14	06:10:59	07:18:41	3:30	1:49	87.16%
China	Foshan	05:44:13 (sunrise)	06:07:25	06:09:38	06:11:50	07:17:05	4:25	1:33	87.01%
China	Guangzhou	05:43:27 (sunrise)	06:07:31	06:09:43	06:11:55	07:17:16	4:24	1:34	87.02%
China	Xiamen	05:21:48 (sunrise)	06:08:14	06:10:24	06:12:32	07:20:53	4:18	1:59	87.25%
Taiwan	Hsinchu	05:09:35 (sunrise)	06:09:42	06:10:36	06:11:29	07:22:53	1:47	2:13	87.37%
Taiwan	Taoyuan	05:07:52 (sunrise)	06:09:50	06:10:50	06:11:49	07:23:22	1:59	2:16	87.39%
Taiwan	Taipei	05:07:13	06:10:00	06:10:56	06:11:50	07:23:37	1:50	2:17	87.40%
China	Fuzhou	05:13:53 (sunrise)	06:10:16	06:12:23	06:14:30	07:23:55	4:14	2:10	87.34%
Japan	Kagoshima	06:12:48	07:20:03	07:22:11	07:24:19	08:42:27	4:16	2:30	87.93%
Japan	Kobe	06:17:10	07:28:48	07:29:42	07:30:35	08:53:57	1:47	2:37	88.18%
Japan	Osaka	06:17:09	07:28:28	07:29:53	07:31:16	08:54:23	2:48	2:37	88.19%
Japan	Kyoto	06:17:42	07:29:52	07:30:37	07:31:21	08:55:21	1:29	2:38	88.21%
Japan	Suzuka	06:17:29	07:28:53	07:30:53	07:32:53	08:56:18	4:00	2:39	88.24%
Japan	Hamamatsu	06:17:16	07:28:50	07:31:20	07:33:49	08:57:44	4:59	2:40	88.28%
Japan	Nagoya	06:17:58	07:29:45	07:31:36	07:33:27	08:57:18	3:42	2:39	88.26%
Japan	Shizuoka	06:17:45	07:29:46	07:32:16	07:34:46	08:59:14	5:00	2:41	88.31%
Japan	Yokosuka	06:18:24	07:31:18	07:33:46	07:36:15	09:01:51	4:57	2:43	88.37%
Japan	Yokohama	06:18:41	07:31:30	07:34:01	07:36:32	09:02:00	5:02	2:43	88.37%
Japan	Sagamihara	06:18:51	07:31:34	07:34:04	07:36:35	09:01:54	5:01	2:43	88.36%
Japan	Kawasaki	06:18:49	07:31:44	07:34:16	07:36:47	09:02:22	5:03	2:44	88.37%
Japan	Tokyo	06:19:06	07:32:01	07:34:32	07:37:04	09:02:38	5:03	2:44	88.37%
Japan	Utsunomiya	06:20:37	07:34:14	07:36:18	07:38:22	09:04:31	4:08	2:44	88.39%
United States	Carson City	17:15:54	18:29:18	18:31:14	18:33:10	19:37:40	3:52	2:22	87.66%
United States	Santa Fe	18:27:45	19:33:11	19:34:58	19:36:44	20:06:16 (sunset)	3:33	1:39	87.09%
United States	Albuquerque	18:28:22	19:33:37	19:35:50	19:38:03	20:07:43 (sunset)	4:26	1:39	87.10%
United States	Midland	19:32:57	20:36:26	20:37:45	20:39:04	20:42:27 (sunset)	2:38	1:10	86.86%

=== Places experiencing partial eclipse ===
Solar Eclipse of May 20, 2012 (Local Times)
Country or territory	City or place	Start of partial eclipse	Maximum eclipse	End of partial eclipse	Duration of eclipse (hr:min)	Maximum coverage
Palau	Ngerulmud	05:57:21	06:51:35	07:53:16	1:56	26.48%
Philippines	Manila	05:27:00 (sunrise)	05:58:42	07:06:11	1:39	61.59%
Malaysia	Kota Kinabalu	05:59:53 (sunrise)	06:02:09	06:51:48	0:52	39.97%
Guam	Hagåtña	07:00:38	08:02:21	09:14:38	2:14	29.03%
Brunei	Bandar Seri Begawan	06:06:03 (sunrise)	06:08:19	06:50:17	0:44	33.95%
Taiwan	Kaohsiung	05:14:52 (sunrise)	06:08:22	07:19:50	2:05	84.82%
Taiwan	Taichung	05:12:03 (sunrise)	06:09:47	07:21:42	2:10	86.91%
Vietnam	Hanoi	05:16:48 (sunrise)	05:19:15	06:13:42	0:57	74.87%
China	Shanghai	05:15:02	06:19:44	07:33:14	2:18	81.34%
Japan	Kumamoto	06:14:36	07:24:16	08:44:46	2:30	87.68%
Japan	Fukuoka	06:15:53	07:25:29	08:45:46	2:30	86.01%
Cambodia	Stung Treng	05:28:43 (sunrise)	05:31:03	06:04:48	0:36	37.77%
South Korea	Seoul	06:23:15	07:31:07	08:48:20	2:25	73.44%
China	Beijing	05:31:29	06:33:13	07:41:53	2:10	57.49%
North Korea	Pyongyang	06:26:11	07:33:16	08:49:15	2:23	68.96%
Laos	Vientiane	05:34:59 (sunrise)	05:37:23	06:10:30	0:36	38.74%
Japan	Niigata	06:22:54	07:38:12	09:05:31	2:43	86.56%
Cambodia	Phnom Penh	05:35:59 (sunrise)	05:38:17	06:02:40	0:27	23.75%
Thailand	Khon Kaen	05:36:36 (sunrise)	05:38:58	06:08:46	0:32	33.23%
Mongolia	Ulaanbaatar	05:51:56	06:46:46	07:46:04	1:54	36.20%
Japan	Sapporo	06:33:05	07:49:49	09:17:35	2:45	77.80%
Russia	Yuzhno-Sakhalinsk	08:41:39	09:58:33	11:25:18	2:44	70.51%
Russia	Petropavlovsk-Kamchatsky	10:03:14	11:27:39	12:59:04	2:56	70.92%
Russia	Anadyr	10:43:38	12:01:43	13:20:14	2:37	50.26%
Canada	Toronto	20:19:23	20:38:20	20:41:39 (sunset)	0:22	15.90%
Canada	Calgary	18:03:56	19:13:57	20:17:44	2:14	61.70%
Canada	Vancouver	16:58:39	18:14:52	19:23:15	2:25	72.86%
United States	Los Angeles	17:24:58	18:38:15	19:42:41	2:18	78.52%
Mexico	Ciudad Juárez	18:32:51	19:39:31	19:59:31 (sunset)	1:27	83.87%
Mexico	Hermosillo	17:35:45	18:43:25	19:11:55 (sunset)	1:36	72.42%

== Gallery ==
=== Asia ===
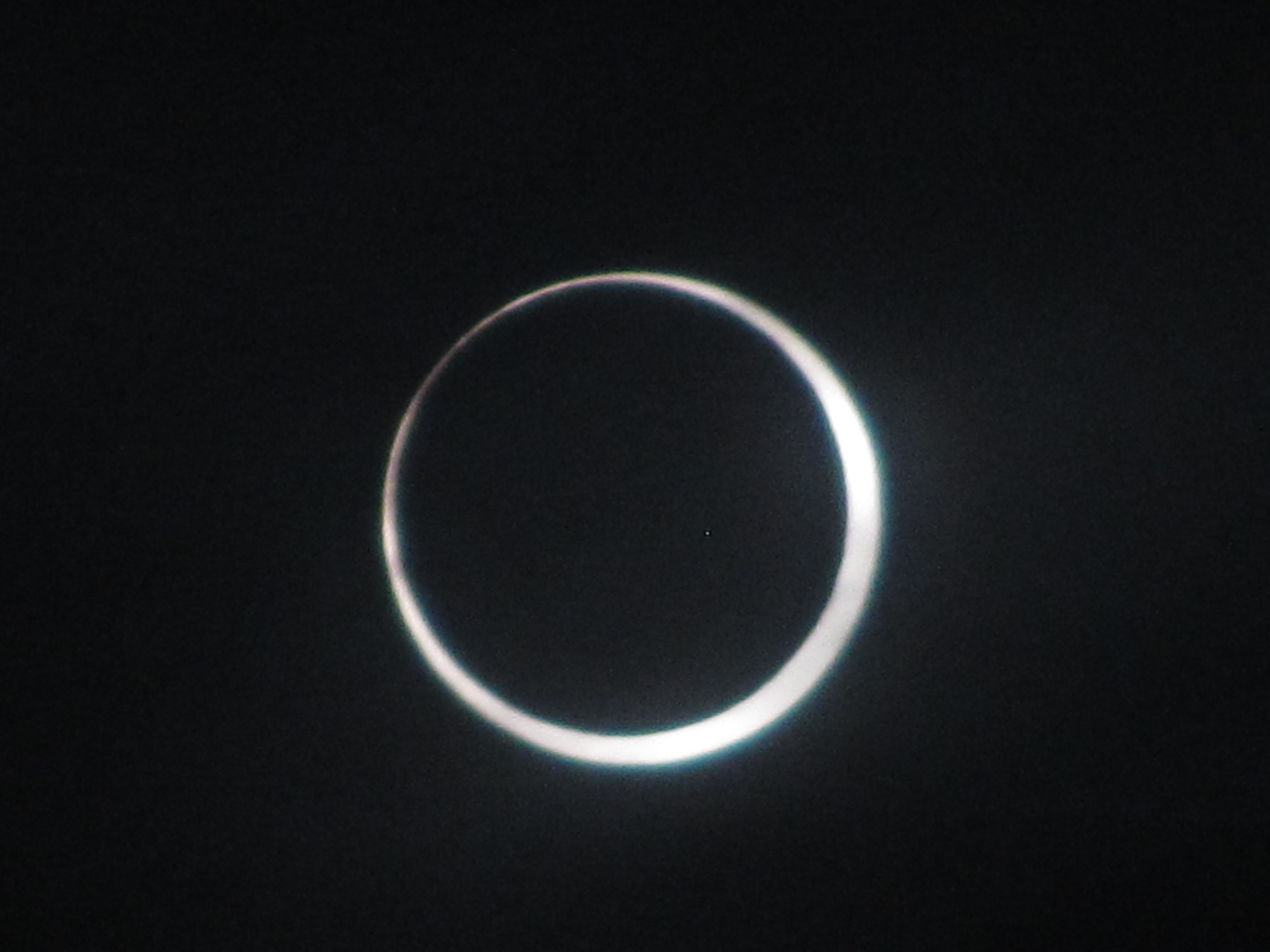
Annular from Keelung, Taiwan

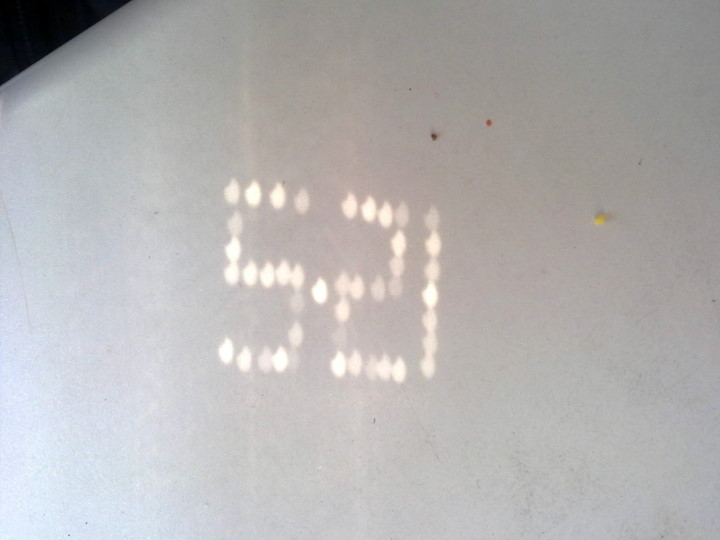
Eclipse projection from Changchun, China

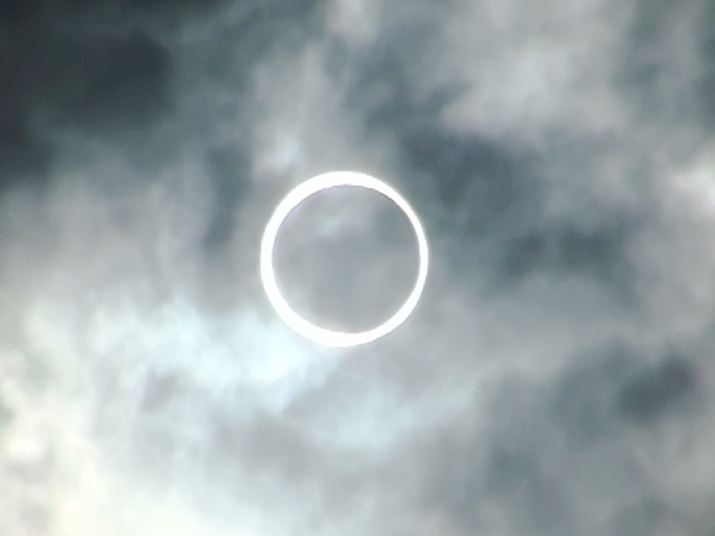
Annular from Kōfu, Yamanashi

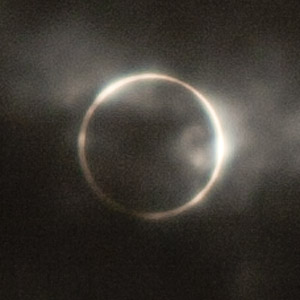
Annular from Yokohama, Kanagawa

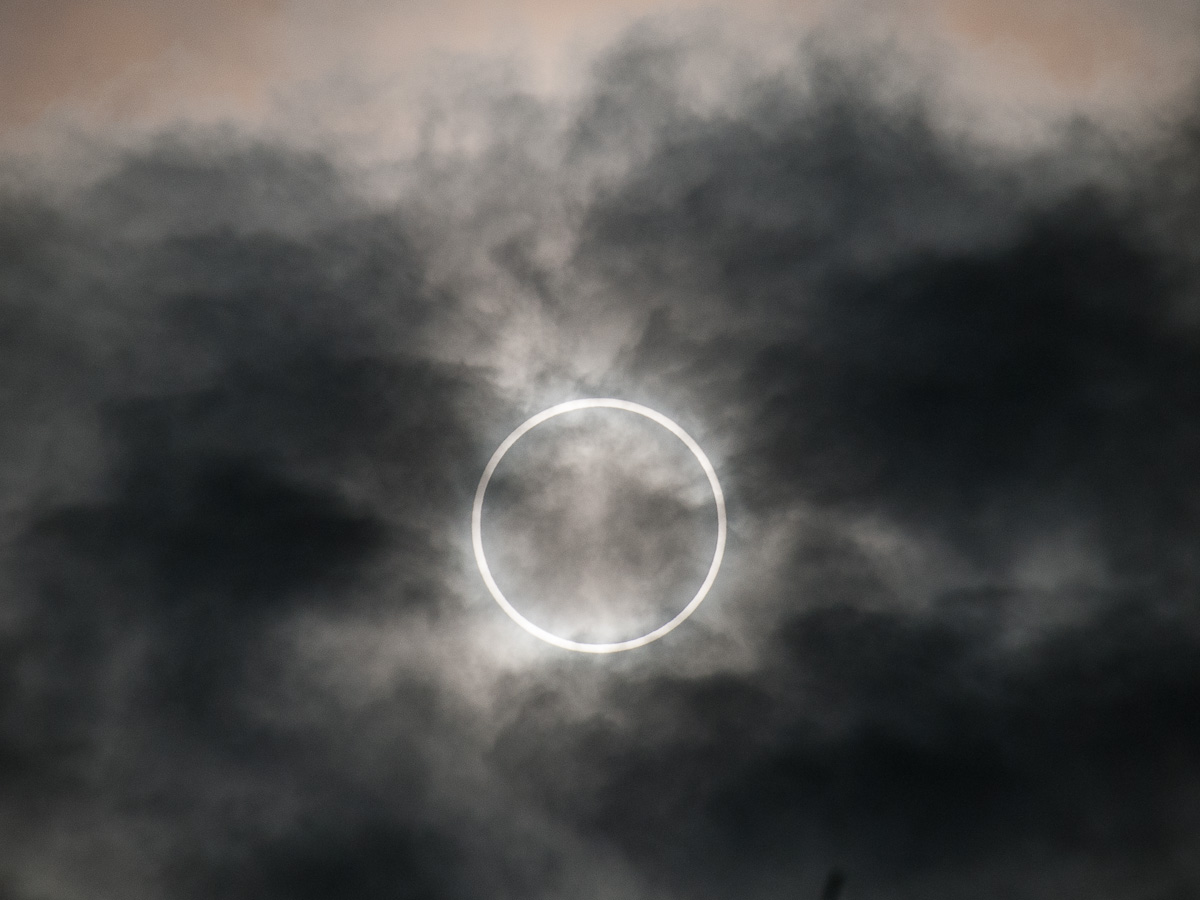
Annular from Shibuya, Tokyo

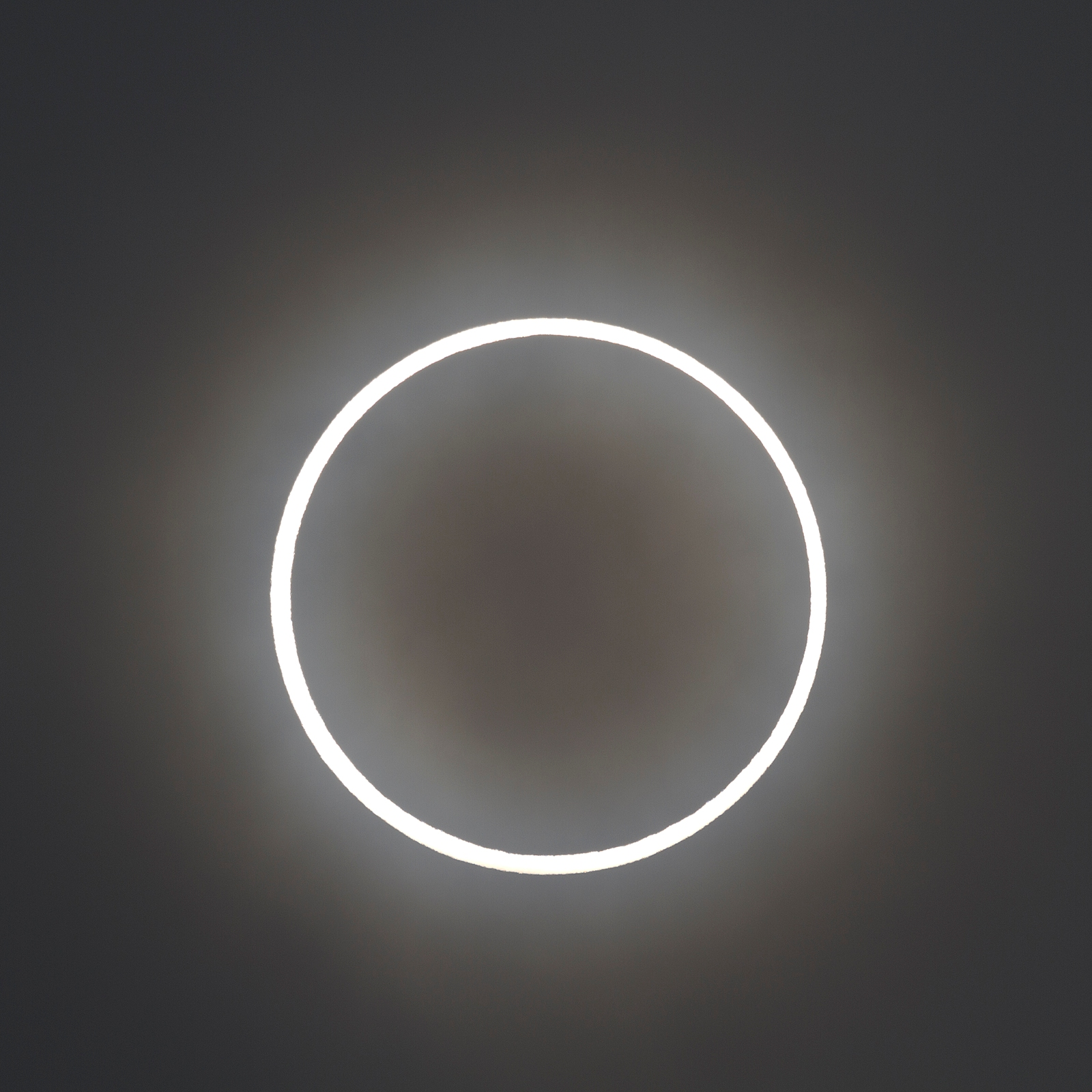
Annular from Kashima, Ibaraki

=== North America ===
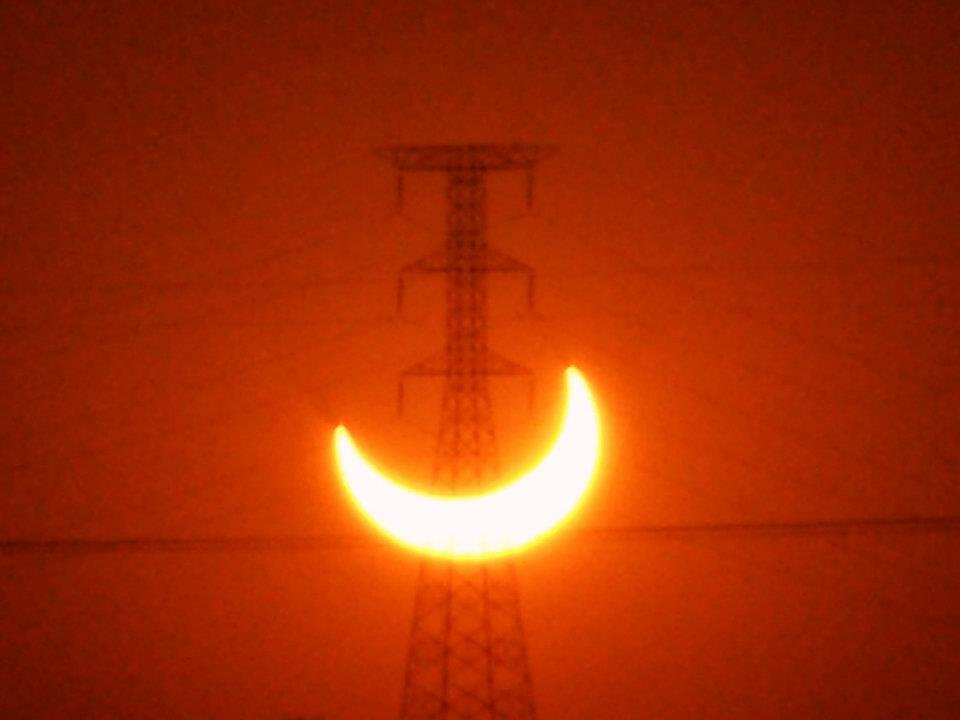
Partial from Ciudad Juárez, Mexico

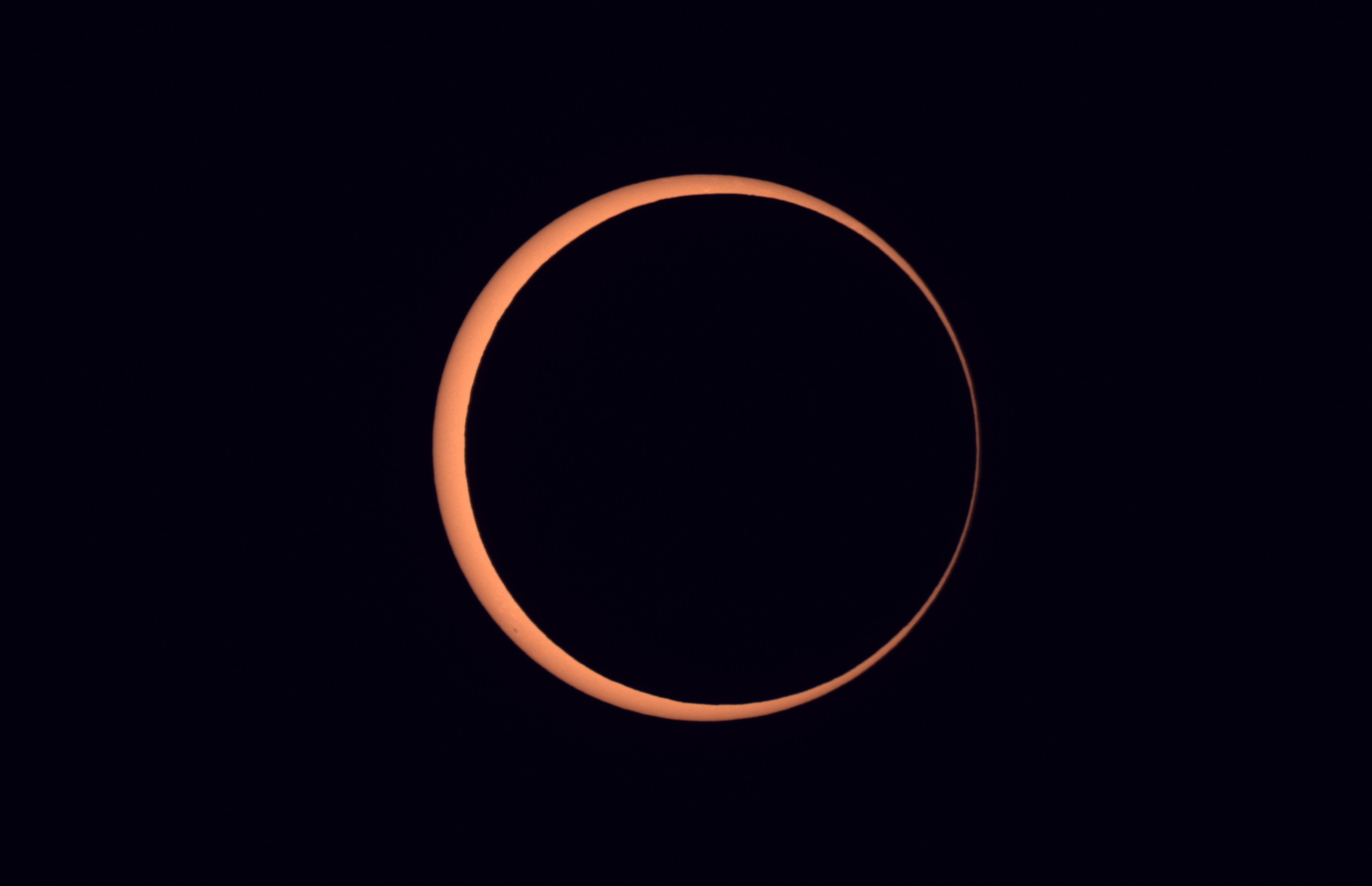
Annular from Nevada City, California

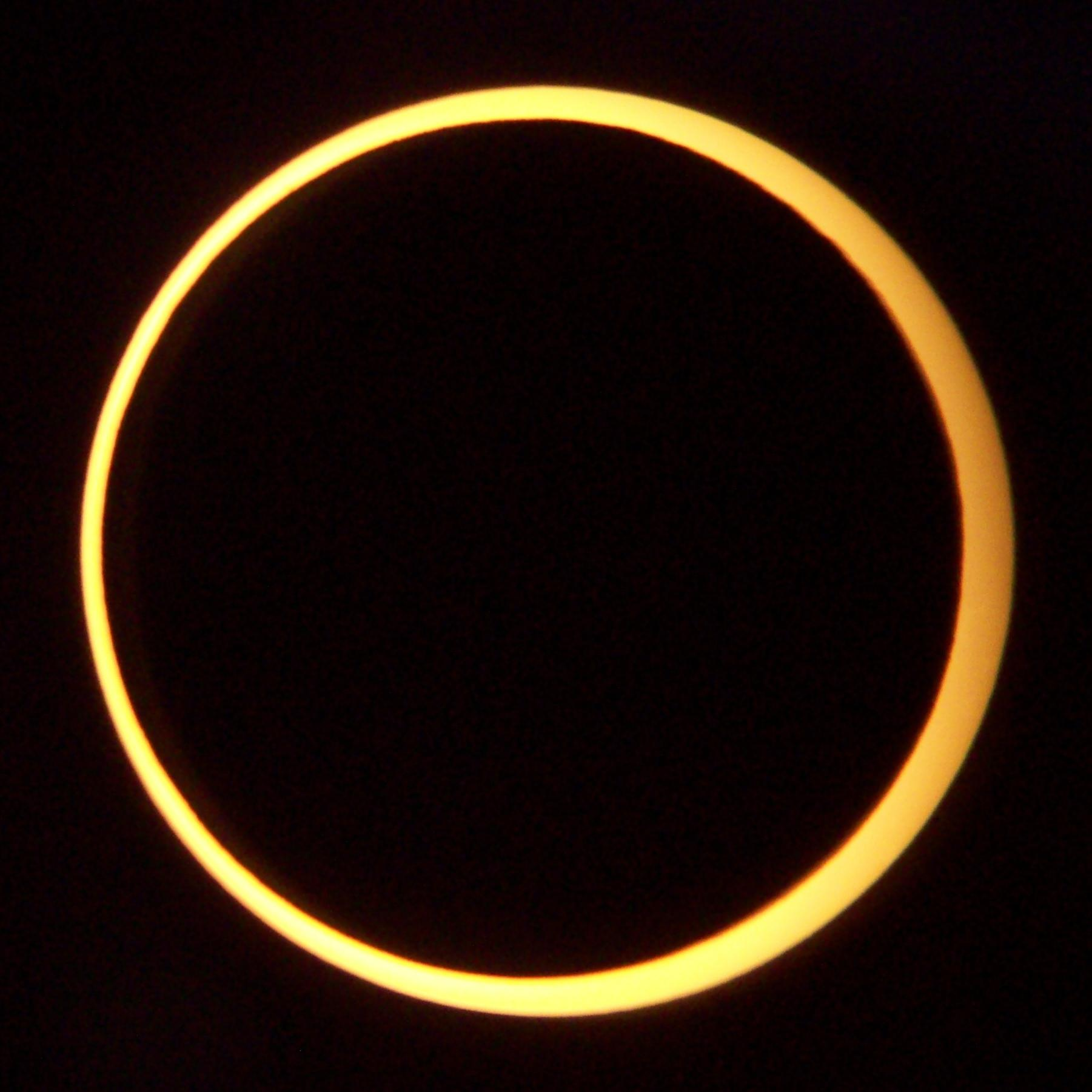
Annular from Middlegate, Nevada

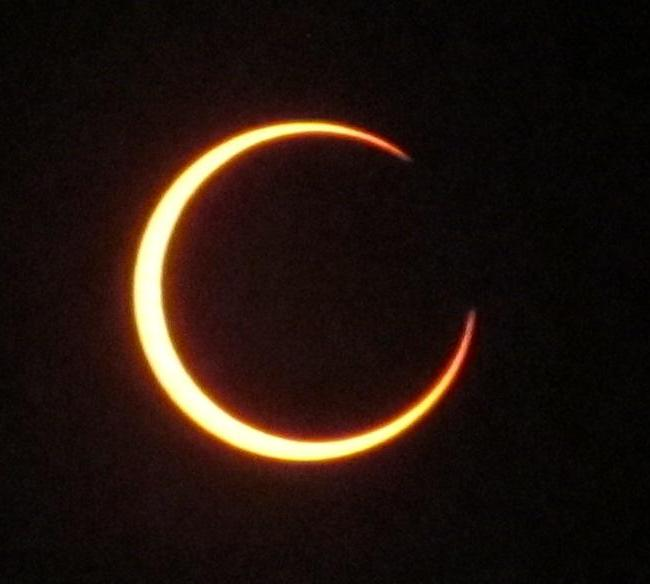
Partial from Flagstaff, Arizona

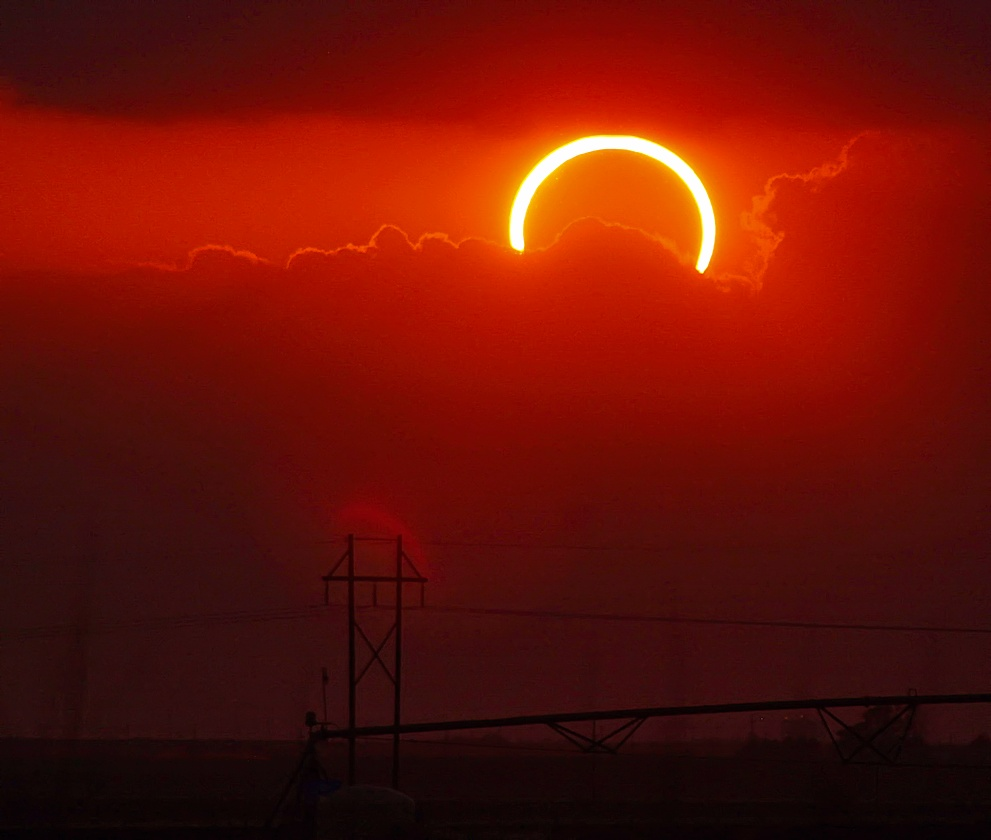
Annular from Wolfforth, Texas

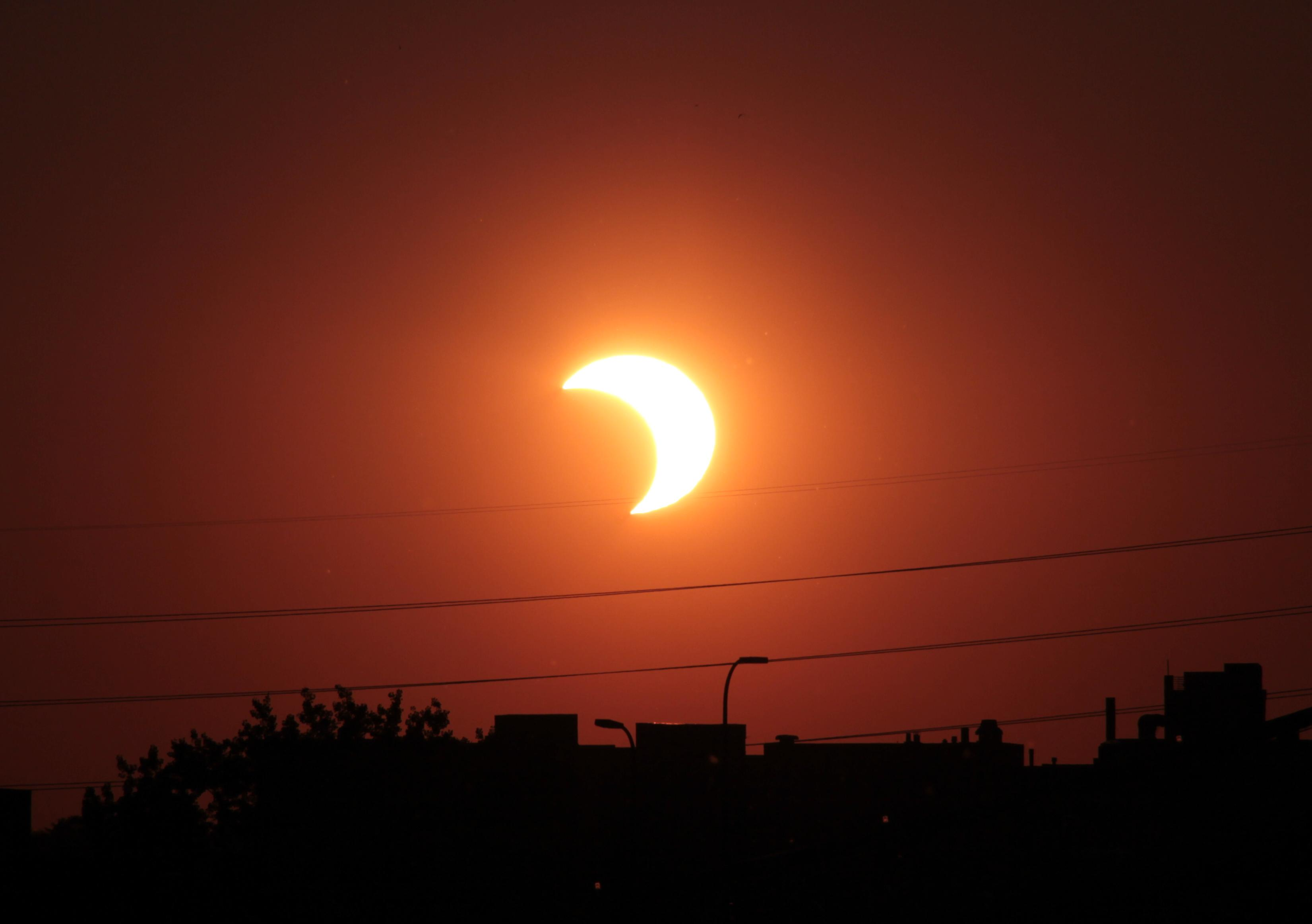
Partial from Minneapolis, Minnesota

== Eclipse details ==
Shown below are two tables displaying details about this particular solar eclipse. The first table outlines times at which the Moon's penumbra or umbra attains the specific parameter, and the second table describes various other parameters pertaining to this eclipse.

May 20, 2012 Solar Eclipse Times
Event	Time (UTC)
First Penumbral External Contact	2012 May 20 at 20:57:13.9 UTC
First Umbral External Contact	2012 May 20 at 22:07:23.9 UTC
First Central Line	2012 May 20 at 22:10:08.2 UTC
First Umbral Internal Contact	2012 May 20 at 22:12:53.7 UTC
Ecliptic Conjunction	2012 May 20 at 23:48:08.1 UTC
Greatest Eclipse	2012 May 20 at 23:53:53.6 UTC
Greatest Duration	2012 May 20 at 23:56:59.8 UTC
Equatorial Conjunction	2012 May 21 at 00:00:16.3 UTC
Last Umbral Internal Contact	2012 May 21 at 01:34:49.7 UTC
Last Central Line	2012 May 21 at 01:37:34.4 UTC
Last Umbral External Contact	2012 May 21 at 01:40:18.0 UTC
Last Penumbral External Contact	2012 May 21 at 02:50:28.7 UTC

May 20, 2012 Solar Eclipse Parameters
Parameter	Value
Eclipse Magnitude	0.94390
Eclipse Obscuration	0.89094
Gamma	0.48279
Sun Right Ascension	03h52m43.0s
Sun Declination	+20°13'15.1"
Sun Semi-Diameter	15'48.1"
Sun Equatorial Horizontal Parallax	08.7"
Moon Right Ascension	03h52m30.7s
Moon Declination	+20°39'06.3"
Moon Semi-Diameter	14'43.3"
Moon Equatorial Horizontal Parallax	0°54'01.7"
ΔT	66.7 s

== Eclipse season ==
This eclipse is part of an eclipse season, a period, roughly every six months, when eclipses occur. Only two (or occasionally three) eclipse seasons occur each year, and each season lasts about 35 days and repeats just short of six months (173 days) later; thus two full eclipse seasons always occur each year. Either two or three eclipses happen each eclipse season. In the sequence below, each eclipse is separated by a fortnight.

Eclipse season of May–June 2012
May 20 Descending node (new moon)	June 4 Ascending node (full moon)
Annular solar eclipse Solar Saros 128	Partial lunar eclipse Lunar Saros 140

== Related eclipses ==
=== Eclipses in 2012 ===
- An annular solar eclipse on May 20.
- A partial lunar eclipse on June 4.
- A total solar eclipse on November 13.
- A penumbral lunar eclipse on November 28.

=== Metonic ===
- Preceded by: Solar eclipse of August 1, 2008
- Followed by: Solar eclipse of March 9, 2016

=== Tzolkinex ===
- Preceded by: Solar eclipse of April 8, 2005
- Followed by: Solar eclipse of July 2, 2019

=== Half-Saros ===
- Preceded by: Lunar eclipse of May 16, 2003
- Followed by: Lunar eclipse of May 26, 2021

=== Tritos ===
- Preceded by: Solar eclipse of June 21, 2001
- Followed by: Solar eclipse of April 20, 2023

=== Solar Saros 128 ===
- Preceded by: Solar eclipse of May 10, 1994
- Followed by: Solar eclipse of June 1, 2030

=== Inex ===
- Preceded by: Solar eclipse of June 11, 1983
- Followed by: Solar eclipse of April 30, 2041

=== Triad ===
- Preceded by: Solar eclipse of July 20, 1925
- Followed by: Solar eclipse of March 21, 2099

=== Solar eclipses of 2011–2014 ===
This eclipse is a member of a semester series. An eclipse in a semester series of solar eclipses repeats approximately every 177 days and 4 hours (a semester) at alternating nodes of the Moon's orbit.

The partial solar eclipses on January 4, 2011 and July 1, 2011 occur in the previous lunar year eclipse set.

Solar eclipse series sets from 2011 to 2014
Descending node			Ascending node		
Saros	Map	Gamma	Saros	Map	Gamma
118 Partial in Tromsø, Norway	June 1, 2011 Partial	1.21300	123 Hinode XRT footage	November 25, 2011 Partial	−1.05359
128 Annularity in Red Bluff, CA, USA	May 20, 2012 Annular	0.48279	133 Totality in Mount Carbine, Queensland, Australia	November 13, 2012 Total	−0.37189
138 Annularity in Churchills Head, Australia	May 10, 2013 Annular	−0.26937	143 Partial in Libreville, Gabon	November 3, 2013 Hybrid	0.32715
148 Partial in Adelaide, Australia	April 29, 2014 Annular (non-central)	−0.99996	153 Partial in Minneapolis, MN, USA	October 23, 2014 Partial	1.09078

=== Saros 128 ===
This eclipse is a part of Saros series 128, repeating every 18 years, 11 days, and containing 73 events. The series started with a partial solar eclipse on August 29, 984 AD. It contains total eclipses from May 16, 1417 through June 18, 1471; hybrid eclipses from June 28, 1489 through July 31, 1543; and annular eclipses from August 11, 1561 through July 25, 2120. The series ends at member 73 as a partial eclipse on November 1, 2282. Its eclipses are tabulated in three columns; every third eclipse in the same column is one exeligmos apart, so they all cast shadows over approximately the same parts of the Earth.

The longest duration of totality was produced by member 27 at 1 minutes, 45 seconds on June 7, 1453, and the longest duration of annularity was produced by member 48 at 8 minutes, 35 seconds on February 1, 1832. All eclipses in this series occur at the Moon’s descending node of orbit.

Series members 47–68 occur between 1801 and 2200:
47	48	49
January 21, 1814	February 1, 1832	February 12, 1850
50	51	52
February 23, 1868	March 5, 1886	March 17, 1904
53	54	55
March 28, 1922	April 7, 1940	April 19, 1958
56	57	58
April 29, 1976	May 10, 1994	May 20, 2012
59	60	61
June 1, 2030	June 11, 2048	June 22, 2066
62	63	64
July 3, 2084	July 15, 2102	July 25, 2120
65	66	67
August 5, 2138	August 16, 2156	August 27, 2174
68
September 6, 2192

=== Metonic series ===
The metonic series repeats eclipses every 19 years (6939.69 days), lasting about 5 cycles. Eclipses occur in nearly the same calendar date. In addition, the octon subseries repeats 1/5 of that or every 3.8 years (1387.94 days). All eclipses in this table occur at the Moon's descending node.

21 eclipse events between May 21, 1993 and May 20, 2069
May 20–21	March 9	December 25–26	October 13–14	August 1–2
118	120	122	124	126
May 21, 1993	March 9, 1997	December 25, 2000	October 14, 2004	August 1, 2008
128	130	132	134	136
May 20, 2012	March 9, 2016	December 26, 2019	October 14, 2023	August 2, 2027
138	140	142	144	146
May 21, 2031	March 9, 2035	December 26, 2038	October 14, 2042	August 2, 2046
148	150	152	154	156
May 20, 2050	March 9, 2054	December 26, 2057	October 13, 2061	August 2, 2065
158
May 20, 2069

=== Tritos series ===
This eclipse is a part of a tritos cycle, repeating at alternating nodes every 135 synodic months (≈ 3986.63 days, or 11 years minus 1 month). Their appearance and longitude are irregular due to a lack of synchronization with the anomalistic month (period of perigee), but groupings of 3 tritos cycles (≈ 33 years minus 3 months) come close (≈ 434.044 anomalistic months), so eclipses are similar in these groupings.

Series members between 1801 and 2200
January 1, 1805 (Saros 109)		October 31, 1826 (Saros 111)		August 28, 1848 (Saros 113)
July 29, 1859 (Saros 114)	June 28, 1870 (Saros 115)	May 27, 1881 (Saros 116)	April 26, 1892 (Saros 117)	March 29, 1903 (Saros 118)
February 25, 1914 (Saros 119)	January 24, 1925 (Saros 120)	December 25, 1935 (Saros 121)	November 23, 1946 (Saros 122)	October 23, 1957 (Saros 123)
September 22, 1968 (Saros 124)	August 22, 1979 (Saros 125)	July 22, 1990 (Saros 126)	June 21, 2001 (Saros 127)	May 20, 2012 (Saros 128)
April 20, 2023 (Saros 129)	March 20, 2034 (Saros 130)	February 16, 2045 (Saros 131)	January 16, 2056 (Saros 132)	December 17, 2066 (Saros 133)
November 15, 2077 (Saros 134)	October 14, 2088 (Saros 135)	September 14, 2099 (Saros 136)	August 15, 2110 (Saros 137)	July 14, 2121 (Saros 138)
June 13, 2132 (Saros 139)	May 14, 2143 (Saros 140)	April 12, 2154 (Saros 141)	March 12, 2165 (Saros 142)	February 10, 2176 (Saros 143)
January 9, 2187 (Saros 144)	December 9, 2197 (Saros 145)			

=== Inex series ===
This eclipse is a part of the long period inex cycle, repeating at alternating nodes, every 358 synodic months (≈ 10,571.95 days, or 29 years minus 20 days). Their appearance and longitude are irregular due to a lack of synchronization with the anomalistic month (period of perigee). However, groupings of 3 inex cycles (≈ 87 years minus 2 months) comes close (≈ 1,151.02 anomalistic months), so eclipses are similar in these groupings.

Series members between 1801 and 2200
October 9, 1809 (Saros 121)	September 18, 1838 (Saros 122)	August 29, 1867 (Saros 123)
August 9, 1896 (Saros 124)	July 20, 1925 (Saros 125)	June 30, 1954 (Saros 126)
June 11, 1983 (Saros 127)	May 20, 2012 (Saros 128)	April 30, 2041 (Saros 129)
April 11, 2070 (Saros 130)	March 21, 2099 (Saros 131)	March 1, 2128 (Saros 132)
February 9, 2157 (Saros 133)	January 20, 2186 (Saros 134)	
