= March 1940 lunar eclipse =

Penumbral lunar eclipse March 23, 1940

- Penumbral eclipse
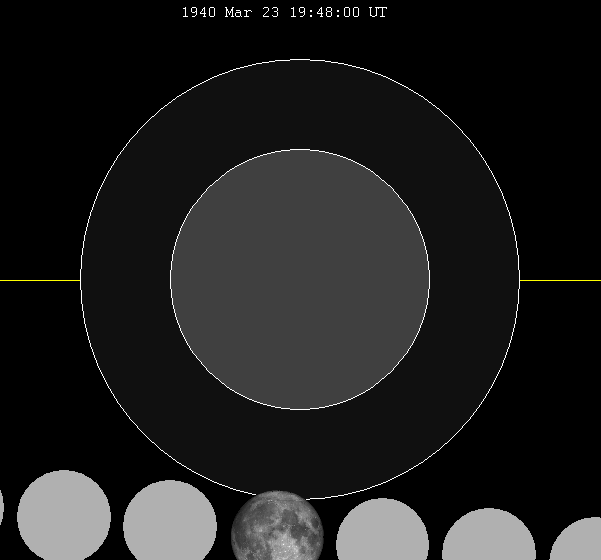
- The Moon's hourly motion shown right to left
- Date: March 23, 1940
- Gamma: −1.5034
- Magnitude: −0.8802
- Saros cycle: 102 (83 of 84)
- Penumbral: 74 minutes, 38 seconds
Contacts (UTC)
- P1: 19:10:34
- Greatest: 19:47:55
- P4: 20:25:12

A penumbral lunar eclipse occurred at the Moon's ascending node of orbit on Saturday, March 23, 1940, with an umbral magnitude of −0.8802. A lunar eclipse occurs when the Moon moves into the Earth's shadow, causing the Moon to be darkened. A penumbral lunar eclipse occurs when part or all of the Moon's near side passes into the Earth's penumbra. Unlike a solar eclipse, which can only be viewed from a relatively small area of the world, a lunar eclipse may be viewed from anywhere on the night side of Earth. Occurring only about 8.5 hours after perigee (on March 23, 1940, at 11:05 UTC), the Moon's apparent diameter was larger.

It occurred on Easter Sunday (Gregorian only).

== Visibility ==
The eclipse was completely visible over Africa, Europe, and Asia, seen rising over Iceland and parts of the Atlantic Ocean and setting over northeast Asia and Oceania.

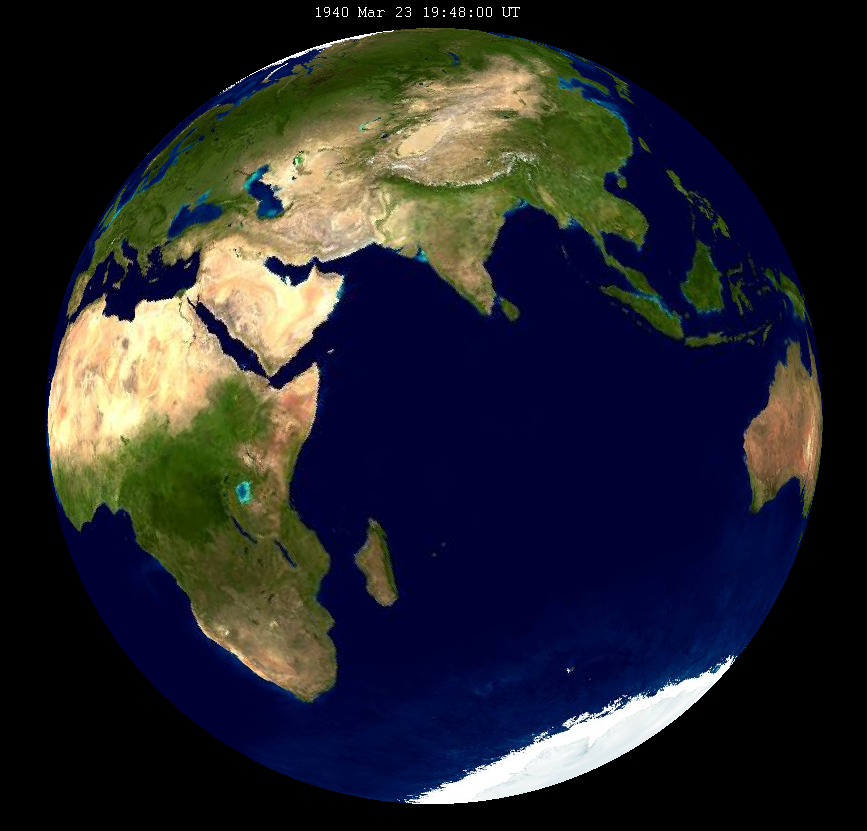
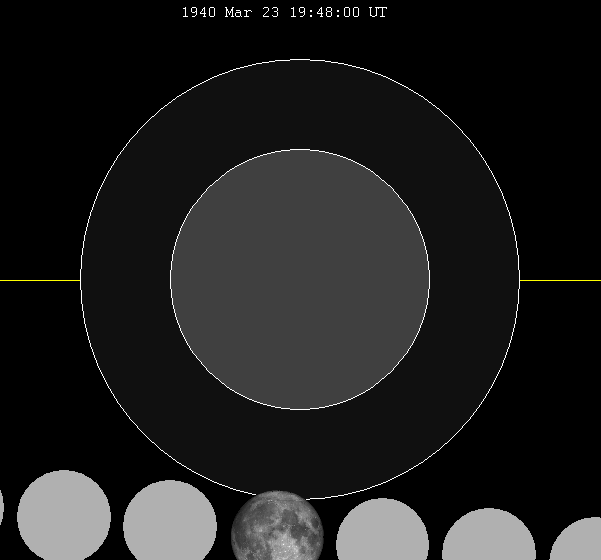

== Eclipse details ==
Shown below is a table displaying details about this particular solar eclipse. It describes various parameters pertaining to this eclipse.

March 23, 1940 Lunar Eclipse Parameters
Parameter	Value
Penumbral Magnitude	0.07888
Umbral Magnitude	−0.88017
Gamma	−1.50338
Sun Right Ascension	00h11m07.9s
Sun Declination	+01°12'22.5"
Sun Semi-Diameter	16'02.4"
Sun Equatorial Horizontal Parallax	08.8"
Moon Right Ascension	12h09m13.6s
Moon Declination	-02°40'07.6"
Moon Semi-Diameter	16'43.5"
Moon Equatorial Horizontal Parallax	1°01'23.1"
ΔT	24.5 s

== Eclipse season ==
This eclipse is part of an eclipse season, a period, roughly every six months, when eclipses occur. Only two (or occasionally three) eclipse seasons occur each year, and each season lasts about 35 days and repeats just short of six months (173 days) later; thus two full eclipse seasons always occur each year. Either two or three eclipses happen each eclipse season. In the sequence below, each eclipse is separated by a fortnight. The first and last eclipse in this sequence is separated by one synodic month.

Eclipse season of March–April 1940
March 23 Ascending node (full moon)	April 7 Descending node (new moon)	April 22 Ascending node (full moon)
Penumbral lunar eclipse Lunar Saros 102	Annular solar eclipse Solar Saros 128	Penumbral lunar eclipse Lunar Saros 140

== Related eclipses ==
=== Eclipses in 1940 ===
- A penumbral lunar eclipse on March 23.
- An annular solar eclipse on April 7.
- A penumbral lunar eclipse on April 22.
- A total solar eclipse on October 1.
- A penumbral lunar eclipse on October 16.

=== Tzolkinex ===
- Preceded by: Lunar eclipse of February 10, 1933

=== Tritos ===
- Followed by: Lunar eclipse of February 21, 1951

=== Lunar Saros 102 ===
- Preceded by: Lunar eclipse of March 13, 1922
- Followed by: Lunar eclipse of April 4, 1958

=== Triad ===
- Followed by: Lunar eclipse of January 24, 2027

=== Lunar eclipses of 1940–1944 ===
This eclipse is a member of a semester series. An eclipse in a semester series of lunar eclipses repeats approximately every 177 days and 4 hours (a semester) at alternating nodes of the Moon's orbit.

The penumbral lunar eclipses on April 22, 1940 and October 16, 1940 occur in the previous lunar year eclipse set, and the penumbral lunar eclipses on July 6, 1944 and December 29, 1944 occur in the next lunar year eclipse set.

Lunar eclipse series sets from 1940 to 1944
Ascending node				Descending node			
Saros	Date Viewing	Type Chart	Gamma	Saros	Date Viewing	Type Chart	Gamma
102	1940 Mar 23	Penumbral	−1.5034	107			
112	1941 Mar 13	Partial	−0.8437	117	1941 Sep 05	Partial	0.9747
122	1942 Mar 03	Total	−0.1545	127	1942 Aug 26	Total	0.1818
132	1943 Feb 20	Partial	0.5752	137	1943 Aug 15	Partial	−0.5534
142	1944 Feb 09	Penumbral	1.2698	147	1944 Aug 04	Penumbral	−1.2843

=== Saros 102 ===
This eclipse is a part of Saros series 102, repeating every 18 years, 11 days, and containing 84 events. The series started with a penumbral lunar eclipse on October 5, 461 AD. It contains partial eclipses from May 20, 840 AD through July 13, 930 AD; total eclipses from July 23, 948 AD through April 20, 1399; and a second set of partial eclipses from May 1, 1417 through July 16, 1543. The series ends at member 84 as a penumbral eclipse on April 4, 1958.

The longest duration of totality was produced by member 36 at 104 minutes, 43 seconds on October 7, 1074. All eclipses in this series occur at the Moon’s ascending node of orbit.

Greatest	First			
The greatest eclipse of the series occurred on 1074 Oct 07, lasting 104 minutes, 43 seconds.	Penumbral	Partial	Total	Central
The greatest eclipse of the series occurred on 1074 Oct 07, lasting 104 minutes, 43 seconds.	461 Oct 05	840 May 20	948 Jul 23	984 Aug 14
The greatest eclipse of the series occurred on 1074 Oct 07, lasting 104 minutes, 43 seconds.	Last			
The greatest eclipse of the series occurred on 1074 Oct 07, lasting 104 minutes, 43 seconds.	Central	Total	Partial	Penumbral
The greatest eclipse of the series occurred on 1074 Oct 07, lasting 104 minutes, 43 seconds.	1345 Mar 18	1399 Apr 20	1543 Jul 16	1958 Apr 04

Eclipses are tabulated in three columns; every third eclipse in the same column is one exeligmos apart, so they all cast shadows over approximately the same parts of the Earth.

Series members 76–84 occur between 1801 and 1958:
76	77	78
1814 Jan 06	1832 Jan 17	1850 Jan 28
79	80	81
1868 Feb 08	1886 Feb 18	1904 Mar 02
82	83	84
1922 Mar 13	1940 Mar 23	1958 Apr 04

=== Tritos series ===
This eclipse is a part of a tritos cycle, repeating at alternating nodes every 135 synodic months (≈ 3986.63 days, or 11 years minus 1 month). Their appearance and longitude are irregular due to a lack of synchronization with the anomalistic month (period of perigee), but groupings of 3 tritos cycles (≈ 33 years minus 3 months) come close (≈ 434.044 anomalistic months), so eclipses are similar in these groupings.

Series members between 1940 and 2200
1940 Mar 23 (Saros 102)	1951 Feb 21 (Saros 103)			
			2027 Jul 18 (Saros 110)	2038 Jun 17 (Saros 111)
2049 May 17 (Saros 112)	2060 Apr 15 (Saros 113)	2071 Mar 16 (Saros 114)	2082 Feb 13 (Saros 115)	2093 Jan 12 (Saros 116)
2103 Dec 13 (Saros 117)	2114 Nov 12 (Saros 118)	2125 Oct 12 (Saros 119)	2136 Sep 10 (Saros 120)	2147 Aug 11 (Saros 121)
2158 Jul 11 (Saros 122)	2169 Jun 09 (Saros 123)	2180 May 09 (Saros 124)	2191 Apr 09 (Saros 125)	

== See also ==
- List of lunar eclipses and List of 21st-century lunar eclipses
