= Solar eclipse of April 7, 1940 =

20th-century annular solar eclipse

- Annular eclipse
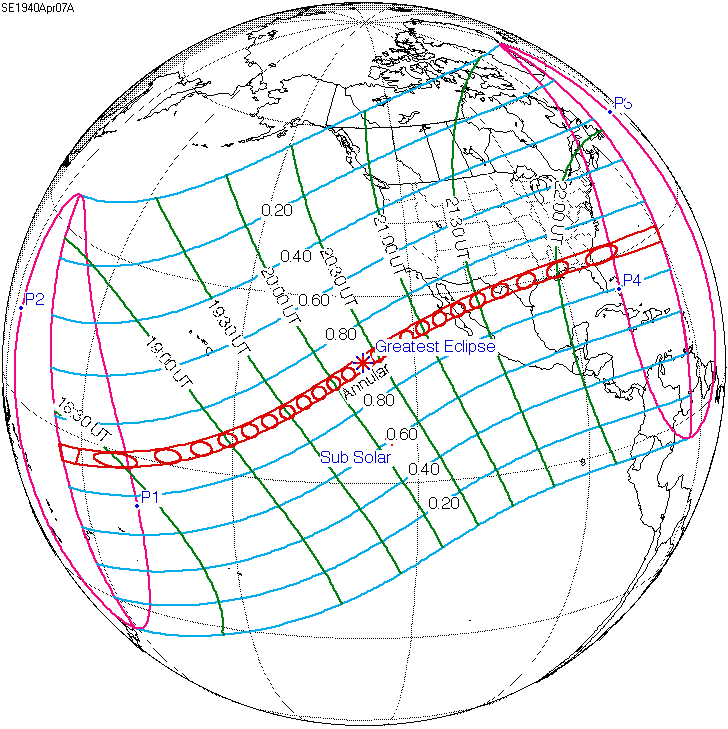
- Map
- Gamma: 0.219
- Magnitude: 0.9394

Maximum eclipse
- Duration: 450 s (7 min 30 s)
- Coordinates: 19.2°N 128.5°W
- Max. width of band: 230 km (140 mi)

Times (UTC)
- Greatest eclipse: 20:21:21

References
- Saros: 128 (54 of 73)
- Catalog # (SE5000): 9375

An annular solar eclipse occurred at the Moon's descending node of orbit on Sunday, April 7, 1940, with a magnitude of 0.9394. A solar eclipse occurs when the Moon passes between Earth and the Sun, thereby totally or partly obscuring the image of the Sun for a viewer on Earth. An annular solar eclipse occurs when the Moon's apparent diameter is smaller than the Sun's, blocking most of the Sun's light and causing the Sun to look like an annulus (ring). An annular eclipse appears as a partial eclipse over a region of the Earth thousands of kilometres wide. Occurring about 2.4 days after apogee (on April 5, 1940, at 10:00 UTC), the Moon's apparent diameter was smaller.

Annularity was visible from Gilbert and Ellice Islands (the part now belonging to Kiribati), Mexico and Texas, Louisiana, Mississippi, Alabama, Georgia, Florida, and South Carolina in the United States. A partial eclipse was visible for parts of eastern Oceania, Hawaii, North America, Central America, the Caribbean, and northern South America.

== Eclipse details ==
Shown below are two tables displaying details about this particular solar eclipse. The first table outlines times at which the Moon's penumbra or umbra attains the specific parameter, and the second table describes various other parameters pertaining to this eclipse.

April 7, 1940 Solar Eclipse Times
| Event | Time (UTC) |
|---|---|
| First Penumbral External Contact | 1940 April 7 at 17:17:50.2 UTC |
| First Umbral External Contact | 1940 April 7 at 18:23:22.6 UTC |
| First Central Line | 1940 April 7 at 18:26:03.9 UTC |
| First Umbral Internal Contact | 1940 April 7 at 18:28:45.3 UTC |
| First Penumbral Internal Contact | 1940 April 7 at 19:37:26.3 UTC |
| Ecliptic Conjunction | 1940 April 7 at 20:18:43.9 UTC |
| Greatest Eclipse | 1940 April 7 at 20:21:20.8 UTC |
| Greatest Duration | 1940 April 7 at 20:26:12.0 UTC |
| Equatorial Conjunction | 1940 April 7 at 20:29:05.3 UTC |
| Last Penumbral Internal Contact | 1940 April 7 at 21:05:02.9 UTC |
| Last Umbral Internal Contact | 1940 April 7 at 22:13:51.7 UTC |
| Last Central Line | 1940 April 7 at 22:16:31.8 UTC |
| Last Umbral External Contact | 1940 April 7 at 22:19:11.6 UTC |
| Last Penumbral External Contact | 1940 April 7 at 23:24:44.5 UTC |

April 7, 1940 Solar Eclipse Parameters
| Parameter | Value |
|---|---|
| Eclipse Magnitude | 0.93942 |
| Eclipse Obscuration | 0.88252 |
| Gamma | 0.21897 |
| Sun Right Ascension | 01h05m52.5s |
| Sun Declination | +07°00'32.1" |
| Sun Semi-Diameter | 15'58.2" |
| Sun Equatorial Horizontal Parallax | 08.8" |
| Moon Right Ascension | 01h05m38.8s |
| Moon Declination | +07°11'53.1" |
| Moon Semi-Diameter | 14'47.0" |
| Moon Equatorial Horizontal Parallax | 0°54'15.4" |
| ΔT | 24.5 s |

== Eclipse season ==
This eclipse is part of an eclipse season, a period, roughly every six months, when eclipses occur. Only two (or occasionally three) eclipse seasons occur each year, and each season lasts about 35 days and repeats just short of six months (173 days) later; thus two full eclipse seasons always occur each year. Either two or three eclipses happen each eclipse season. In the sequence below, each eclipse is separated by a fortnight. The first and last eclipse in this sequence is separated by one synodic month.

Eclipse season of March–April 1940
| March 23 Ascending node (full moon) | April 7 Descending node (new moon) | April 22 Ascending node (full moon) |
|---|---|---|
| Penumbral lunar eclipse Lunar Saros 102 | Annular solar eclipse Solar Saros 128 | Penumbral lunar eclipse Lunar Saros 140 |

== Related eclipses ==
=== Eclipses in 1940 ===
- A penumbral lunar eclipse on March 23.
- An annular solar eclipse on April 7.
- A penumbral lunar eclipse on April 22.
- A total solar eclipse on October 1.
- A penumbral lunar eclipse on October 16.

=== Metonic ===
- Preceded by: Solar eclipse of June 19, 1936
- Followed by: Solar eclipse of January 25, 1944

=== Tzolkinex ===
- Preceded by: Solar eclipse of February 24, 1933
- Followed by: Solar eclipse of May 20, 1947

=== Half-Saros ===
- Preceded by: Lunar eclipse of April 2, 1931
- Followed by: Lunar eclipse of April 13, 1949

=== Tritos ===
- Preceded by: Solar eclipse of May 9, 1929
- Followed by: Solar eclipse of March 7, 1951

=== Solar Saros 128 ===
- Preceded by: Solar eclipse of March 28, 1922
- Followed by: Solar eclipse of April 19, 1958

=== Inex ===
- Preceded by: Solar eclipse of April 28, 1911
- Followed by: Solar eclipse of March 18, 1969

=== Triad ===
- Preceded by: Solar eclipse of June 6, 1853
- Followed by: Solar eclipse of February 6, 2027

=== Solar eclipses of 1939–1942 ===
This eclipse is a member of a semester series. An eclipse in a semester series of solar eclipses repeats approximately every 177 days and 4 hours (a semester) at alternating nodes of the Moon's orbit.

The partial solar eclipse on August 12, 1942 occurs in the next lunar year eclipse set.

Solar eclipse series sets from 1939 to 1942
| Descending node | | | Ascending node | | |
| Saros | Map | Gamma | Saros | Map | Gamma |
| 118 | April 19, 1939 Annular | 0.9388 | 123 | October 12, 1939 Total | −0.9737 |
| 128 | April 7, 1940 Annular | 0.219 | 133 | October 1, 1940 Total | −0.2573 |
| 138 | March 27, 1941 Annular | −0.5025 | 143 | September 21, 1941 Total | 0.4649 |
| 148 | March 16, 1942 Partial | −1.1908 | 153 | September 10, 1942 Partial | 1.2571 |

=== Saros 128 ===
This eclipse is a part of Saros series 128, repeating every 18 years, 11 days, and containing 73 events. The series started with a partial solar eclipse on August 29, 984 AD. It contains total eclipses from May 16, 1417 through June 18, 1471; hybrid eclipses from June 28, 1489 through July 31, 1543; and annular eclipses from August 11, 1561 through July 25, 2120. The series ends at member 73 as a partial eclipse on November 1, 2282. Its eclipses are tabulated in three columns; every third eclipse in the same column is one exeligmos apart, so they all cast shadows over approximately the same parts of the Earth.

The longest duration of totality was produced by member 27 at 1 minutes, 45 seconds on June 7, 1453, and the longest duration of annularity was produced by member 48 at 8 minutes, 35 seconds on February 1, 1832. All eclipses in this series occur at the Moon’s descending node of orbit.

Series members 47–68 occur between 1801 and 2200:
| 47 | 48 | 49 |
|---|---|---|
| January 21, 1814 | February 1, 1832 | February 12, 1850 |
| 50 | 51 | 52 |
| February 23, 1868 | March 5, 1886 | March 17, 1904 |
| 53 | 54 | 55 |
| March 28, 1922 | April 7, 1940 | April 19, 1958 |
| 56 | 57 | 58 |
| April 29, 1976 | May 10, 1994 | May 20, 2012 |
| 59 | 60 | 61 |
| June 1, 2030 | June 11, 2048 | June 22, 2066 |
| 62 | 63 | 64 |
| July 3, 2084 | July 15, 2102 | July 25, 2120 |
| 65 | 66 | 67 |
| August 5, 2138 | August 16, 2156 | August 27, 2174 |
68
September 6, 2192

=== Metonic series ===
The metonic series repeats eclipses every 19 years (6939.69 days), lasting about 5 cycles. Eclipses occur in nearly the same calendar date. In addition, the octon subseries repeats 1/5 of that or every 3.8 years (1387.94 days). All eclipses in this table occur at the Moon's descending node.

22 eclipse events between April 8, 1902 and August 31, 1989
| April 7–8 | January 24–25 | November 12 | August 31–September 1 | June 19–20 |
| 108 | 110 | 112 | 114 | 116 |
|---|---|---|---|---|
| April 8, 1902 | | | August 31, 1913 | June 19, 1917 |
| 118 | 120 | 122 | 124 | 126 |
| April 8, 1921 | January 24, 1925 | November 12, 1928 | August 31, 1932 | June 19, 1936 |
| 128 | 130 | 132 | 134 | 136 |
| April 7, 1940 | January 25, 1944 | November 12, 1947 | September 1, 1951 | June 20, 1955 |
| 138 | 140 | 142 | 144 | 146 |
| April 8, 1959 | January 25, 1963 | November 12, 1966 | August 31, 1970 | June 20, 1974 |
| 148 | 150 | 152 | 154 | |
| April 7, 1978 | January 25, 1982 | November 12, 1985 | August 31, 1989 | |

=== Tritos series ===
This eclipse is a part of a tritos cycle, repeating at alternating nodes every 135 synodic months (≈ 3986.63 days, or 11 years minus 1 month). Their appearance and longitude are irregular due to a lack of synchronization with the anomalistic month (period of perigee), but groupings of 3 tritos cycles (≈ 33 years minus 3 months) come close (≈ 434.044 anomalistic months), so eclipses are similar in these groupings.

Series members between 1801 and 2200
| April 14, 1809 (Saros 116) | March 14, 1820 (Saros 117) | February 12, 1831 (Saros 118) | January 11, 1842 (Saros 119) | December 11, 1852 (Saros 120) |
| November 11, 1863 (Saros 121) | October 10, 1874 (Saros 122) | September 8, 1885 (Saros 123) | August 9, 1896 (Saros 124) | July 10, 1907 (Saros 125) |
| June 8, 1918 (Saros 126) | May 9, 1929 (Saros 127) | April 7, 1940 (Saros 128) | March 7, 1951 (Saros 129) | February 5, 1962 (Saros 130) |
| January 4, 1973 (Saros 131) | December 4, 1983 (Saros 132) | November 3, 1994 (Saros 133) | October 3, 2005 (Saros 134) | September 1, 2016 (Saros 135) |
| August 2, 2027 (Saros 136) | July 2, 2038 (Saros 137) | May 31, 2049 (Saros 138) | April 30, 2060 (Saros 139) | March 31, 2071 (Saros 140) |
| February 27, 2082 (Saros 141) | January 27, 2093 (Saros 142) | December 29, 2103 (Saros 143) | November 27, 2114 (Saros 144) | October 26, 2125 (Saros 145) |
| September 26, 2136 (Saros 146) | August 26, 2147 (Saros 147) | July 25, 2158 (Saros 148) | June 25, 2169 (Saros 149) | May 24, 2180 (Saros 150) |
April 23, 2191 (Saros 151)

=== Inex series ===
This eclipse is a part of the long period inex cycle, repeating at alternating nodes, every 358 synodic months (≈ 10,571.95 days, or 29 years minus 20 days). Their appearance and longitude are irregular due to a lack of synchronization with the anomalistic month (period of perigee). However, groupings of 3 inex cycles (≈ 87 years minus 2 months) comes close (≈ 1,151.02 anomalistic months), so eclipses are similar in these groupings.

Series members between 1801 and 2200
| June 26, 1824 (Saros 124) | June 6, 1853 (Saros 125) | May 17, 1882 (Saros 126) |
| April 28, 1911 (Saros 127) | April 7, 1940 (Saros 128) | March 18, 1969 (Saros 129) |
| February 26, 1998 (Saros 130) | February 6, 2027 (Saros 131) | January 16, 2056 (Saros 132) |
| December 27, 2084 (Saros 133) | December 8, 2113 (Saros 134) | November 17, 2142 (Saros 135) |
| October 29, 2171 (Saros 136) | October 9, 2200 (Saros 137) | |
