= Lunar Saros 102 =

Series of lunar eclipses

Saros cycle series 102 for lunar eclipses occurred at the moon's ascending node, 18 years 11 and 1/3 days. It contained 84 events.

This saros series was linked to Solar Saros 109.

Cat.	Saros	Mem	Date	Time UT (hr:mn)	Type	Gamma	Magnitude	Duration (min)			Contacts UT (hr:mn)						Chart
Cat.	Saros	Mem	Date	Greatest	Type	Gamma	Magnitude	Pen.	Par.	Tot.	P1	P4	U1	U2	U3	U4	Chart
05914	102	1	461 Oct 5	14:59:50	Penumbral	1.5718	-1.0551	17.3			14:51:11	15:08:29					
05960	102	2	479 Oct 16	22:54:35	Penumbral	1.5537	-1.0249	59.5			22:24:50	23:24:20					
06006	102	3	497 Oct 27	6:55:24	Penumbral	1.5411	-1.0043	76.8			6:17:00	7:33:48					
06051	102	4	515 Nov 07	15:00:56	Penumbral	1.5328	-0.9913	86.8			14:17:32	15:44:20					
06096	102	5	533 Nov 17	23:11:15	Penumbral	1.5291	-0.9867	91.4			22:25:33	23:56:57					
06141	102	6	551 Nov 29	7:22:40	Penumbral	1.5266	-0.9837	94.7			6:35:19	8:10:01					
06187	102	7	569 Dec 09	15:35:23	Penumbral	1.5258	-0.9835	96.4			14:47:11	16:23:35					
06233	102	8	587 Dec 20	23:46:02	Penumbral	1.5237	-0.9807	98.8			22:56:38	0:35:26					
06280	102	9	605 Dec 31	7:55:11	Penumbral	1.5209	-0.9761	101.6			7:04:23	8:45:59					
06327	102	10	624 Jan 11	15:57:41	Penumbral	1.5136	-0.9628	107.8			15:03:47	16:51:35					
06373	102	11	642 Jan 21	23:56:00	Penumbral	1.5033	-0.9438	115.6			22:58:12	0:53:48					
06418	102	12	660 Feb 02	7:45:06	Penumbral	1.4862	-0.9121	127.3			6:41:27	8:48:45					
06463	102	13	678 Feb 12	15:27:08	Penumbral	1.4638	-0.8702	141.1			14:16:35	16:37:41					
06509	102	14	696 Feb 23	22:57:48	Penumbral	1.4326	-0.8123	157.9			21:38:51	0:16:45					
06553	102	15	714 Mar 06	6:20:38	Penumbral	1.3954	-0.7432	175.5			4:52:53	7:48:23					
06596	102	16	732 Mar 16	13:32:02	Penumbral	1.3497	-0.6583	194.4			11:54:50	15:09:14					
06641	102	17	750 Mar 27	20:34:13	Penumbral	1.2966	-0.5598	213.7			18:47:22	22:21:04					
06685	102	18	768 Apr 07	3:26:13	Penumbral	1.2353	-0.4464	233.2			1:29:37	5:22:49					
06728	102	19	786 Apr 18	10:10:53	Penumbral	1.1680	-0.3220	252.0			8:04:53	12:16:53					
06770	102	20	804 Apr 28	16:47:44	Penumbral	1.0944	-0.1861	270.0			14:32:44	19:02:44					
06811	102	21	822 May 9	23:18:04	Penumbral	1.0154	-0.0404	286.9			20:54:37	1:41:31					
06852	102	22	840 May 20	5:43:53	Partial	0.9323	0.1125	302.3	81.7		3:12:44	8:15:02	5:03:02			6:24:44	
06892	102	23	858 May 31	12:06:43	Partial	0.8462	0.2708	316.3	123.9		9:28:34	14:44:52	11:04:46			13:08:40	
06933	102	24	876 Jun 10	18:27:49	Partial	0.7583	0.4322	328.6	152.7		15:43:31	21:12:07	17:11:28			19:44:10	
06975	102	25	894 Jun 22	0:49:05	Partial	0.6701	0.5940	339.2	174.5		21:59:29	3:38:41	23:21:50			2:16:20	
07016	102	26	912 Jul 02	7:12:37	Partial	0.5831	0.7535	348.0	191.2		4:18:37	10:06:37	5:37:01			8:48:13	
07056	102	27	930 Jul 13	13:40:18	Partial	0.4989	0.9077	355.2	204.1		10:42:42	16:37:54	11:58:15			15:22:21	
07097	102	28	948 Jul 23	20:11:39	Total	0.4170	1.0574	361.0	214.0	39.0	17:11:09	23:12:09	18:24:39	19:52:09	20:31:09	21:58:39	
07138	102	29	966 Aug 04	2:50:13	Total	0.3406	1.1969	365.3	221.2	69.0	23:47:34	5:52:52	0:59:37	2:15:43	3:24:43	4:40:49	
07179	102	30	984 Aug 14	9:35:35	Total	0.2692	1.3272	368.4	226.3	84.7	6:31:23	12:39:47	7:42:26	8:53:14	10:17:56	11:28:44	
07223	102	31	1002 Aug 25	16:30:31	Total	0.2051	1.4440	370.4	229.7	94.0	13:25:19	19:35:43	14:35:40	15:43:31	17:17:31	18:25:22	
07267	102	32	1020 Sep 04	23:33:25	Total	0.1470	1.5496	371.6	231.8	99.7	20:27:37	2:39:13	21:37:31	22:43:34	0:23:16	1:29:19	
07311	102	33	1038 Sep 16	6:47:20	Total	0.0974	1.6398	372.2	232.9	102.8	3:41:14	9:53:26	4:50:53	5:55:56	7:38:44	8:43:47	
07356	102	34	1056 Sep 26	14:10:44	Total	0.0551	1.7167	372.2	233.2	104.3	11:04:38	17:16:50	12:14:08	13:18:35	15:02:53	16:07:20	
07400	102	35	1074 Oct 07	21:44:00	Total	0.0205	1.7795	371.9	233.1	104.7	18:38:03	0:49:57	19:47:27	20:51:39	22:36:21	23:40:33	
07445	102	36	1092 Oct 18	5:26:35	Total	-0.0070	1.8037	371.4	232.6	104.6	2:20:53	8:32:17	3:30:17	4:34:17	6:18:53	7:22:53	
07491	102	37	1110 Oct 29	13:18:02	Total	-0.0276	1.7657	370.6	232.1	104.2	10:12:44	16:23:20	11:21:59	12:25:56	14:10:08	15:14:05	
07537	102	38	1128 Nov 8	21:17:28	Total	-0.0425	1.7384	369.8	231.5	103.7	18:12:34	0:22:22	19:21:43	20:25:37	22:09:19	23:13:13	
07583	102	39	1146 Nov 20	5:21:53	Total	-0.0538	1.7179	368.9	230.9	103.2	2:17:26	8:26:20	3:26:26	4:30:17	6:13:29	7:17:20	
07631	102	40	1164 Nov 30	13:32:27	Total	-0.0607	1.7058	367.8	230.3	102.8	10:28:33	16:36:21	11:37:18	12:41:03	14:23:51	15:27:36	
07678	102	41	1182 Dec 11	21:45:32	Total	-0.0657	1.6977	366.7	229.8	102.5	18:42:11	0:48:53	19:50:38	20:54:17	22:36:47	23:40:26	
07724	102	42	1200 Dec 22	6:00:34	Total	-0.0701	1.691	365.5	229.3	102.2	2:57:49	9:03:19	4:05:55	5:09:28	6:51:40	7:55:13	
07770	102	43	1219 Jan 02	14:13:50	Total	-0.0764	1.6811	364.1	228.7	101.9	11:11:47	17:15:53	12:19:29	13:22:53	15:04:47	16:08:11	
07816	102	44	1237 Jan 12	22:26:14	Total	-0.0842	1.6689	362.7	228.1	101.5	19:24:53	1:27:35	20:32:11	21:35:29	23:16:59	0:20:17	
07861	102	45	1255 Jan 24	6:34:23	Total	-0.0960	1.6495	361.0	227.4	101.0	3:33:53	9:34:53	4:40:41	5:43:53	7:24:53	8:28:05	
07905	102	46	1273 Feb 03	14:37:42	Total	-0.1123	1.6223	359.2	226.5	100.1	11:38:06	17:37:18	12:44:27	13:47:39	15:27:45	16:30:57	
07950	102	47	1291 Feb 14	22:34:42	Total	-0.1344	1.5845	357.1	225.5	98.6	19:36:09	1:33:15	20:41:57	21:45:24	23:24:00	0:27:27	
07995	102	48	1309 Feb 25	6:25:40	Total	-0.1623	1.5364	354.8	224.0	96.5	3:28:16	9:23:04	4:33:40	5:37:25	7:13:55	8:17:40	
08038	102	49	1327 Mar 08	14:08:34	Total	-0.1975	1.4749	352.1	222.1	93.1	11:12:31	17:04:37	12:17:31	13:22:01	14:55:07	15:59:37	
08079	102	50	1345 Mar 18	21:44:41	Total	-0.2390	1.4020	349.0	219.5	88.1	18:50:11	0:39:11	19:54:56	21:00:38	22:28:44	23:34:26	
08121	102	51	1363 Mar 30	5:13:30	Total	-0.2874	1.3164	345.4	216.1	80.6	2:20:48	8:06:12	3:25:27	4:33:12	5:53:48	7:01:33	
08162	102	52	1381 Apr 09	12:36:50	Total	-0.3410	1.2211	341.1	211.7	69.5	9:46:17	15:27:23	10:50:59	12:02:05	13:11:35	14:22:41	
08203	102	53	1399 Apr 20	19:52:49	Total	-0.4017	1.1127	336.0	205.8	51.3	17:04:49	22:40:49	18:09:55	19:27:10	20:18:28	21:35:43	
08245	102	54	1417 May 1	3:05:22	Partial	-0.4661	0.9973	330.1	198.6		0:20:19	5:50:25	1:26:04			4:44:40	
08287	102	55	1435 May 12	10:13:11	Partial	-0.5356	0.8725	323.2	189.4		7:31:35	12:54:47	8:38:29			11:47:53	
08328	102	56	1453 May 22	17:19:57	Partial	-0.6067	0.7446	315.4	178.2		14:42:15	19:57:39	15:50:51			18:49:03	
08369	102	57	1471 Jun 03	0:23:10	Partial	-0.6815	0.6094	306.4	164.3		21:49:58	2:56:22	23:01:01			1:45:19	
08408	102	58	1489 Jun 13	7:28:45	Partial	-0.7554	0.4757	296.6	147.8		5:00:27	9:57:03	6:14:51			8:42:39	
08448	102	59	1507 Jun 24	14:33:59	Partial	-0.8306	0.3394	285.5	127.0		12:11:14	16:56:44	13:30:29			15:37:29	
08489	102	60	1525 Jul 04	21:43:23	Partial	-0.9029	0.2080	273.8	101.0		19:26:29	0:00:17	20:52:53			22:33:53	
08530	102	61	1543 Jul 16	4:55:02	Partial	-0.9742	0.0784	261.0	62.9		2:44:32	7:05:32	4:23:35			5:26:29	
08573	102	62	1561 Jul 26	12:13:48	Penumbral	-1.0402	-0.0420	247.8			10:09:54	14:17:42					
08616	102	63	1579 Aug 06	19:37:41	Penumbral	-1.1029	-0.1564	234.1			17:40:38	21:34:44					
08659	102	64	1597 Aug 27	3:08:44	Penumbral	-1.1604	-0.2616	220.3			1:18:35	4:58:53					
08704	102	65	1615 Sep 07	10:47:18	Penumbral	-1.2123	-0.3568	206.5			9:04:03	12:30:33					
08748	102	66	1633 Sep 17	18:34:53	Penumbral	-1.2576	-0.4399	193.3			16:58:14	20:11:32					
08792	102	67	1651 Sep 29	2:31:07	Penumbral	-1.2966	-0.5117	180.8			1:00:43	4:01:31					
08837	102	68	1669 Oct 09	10:35:58	Penumbral	-1.3293	-0.5719	169.5			9:11:13	12:00:43					
08883	102	69	1687 Oct 20	18:50:03	Penumbral	-1.3555	-0.6201	159.6			17:30:15	20:09:51					
08929	102	70	1705 Nov 01	3:12:43	Penumbral	-1.3753	-0.6568	151.6			1:56:55	4:28:31					
08976	102	71	1723 Nov 12	11:42:32	Penumbral	-1.3902	-0.6842	145.2			10:29:56	12:55:08					
09022	102	72	1741 Nov 22	20:19:31	Penumbral	-1.3999	-0.7021	140.8			19:09:07	21:29:55					
09069	102	73	1759 Dec 04	5:01:57	Penumbral	-1.4059	-0.7129	137.9			3:53:00	6:10:54					
09115	102	74	1777 Dec 14	13:48:58	Penumbral	-1.4087	-0.7179	136.2			12:40:52	14:57:04					
09160	102	75	1795 Dec 25	22:37:34	Penumbral	-1.4110	-0.7215	134.9			21:30:07	23:45:01					
09205	102	76	1814 Jan 06	7:28:19	Penumbral	-1.4118	-0.7223	134.0			6:21:19	8:35:19					
09250	102	77	1832 Jan 17	16:18:15	Penumbral	-1.4135	-0.7245	132.8			15:11:51	17:24:39					
09297	102	78	1850 Jan 28	1:06:06	Penumbral	-1.4175	-0.7305	130.4			0:00:54	2:11:18					
09341	102	79	1868 Feb 08	9:49:41	Penumbral	-1.4252	-0.7433	126.2			8:46:35	10:52:47					
09384	102	80	1886 Feb 18	18:29:01	Penumbral	-1.4365	-0.7627	119.9			17:29:04	19:28:58					
09428	102	81	1904 Mar 02	3:02:34	Penumbral	-1.4528	-0.7910	110.5			2:07:19	3:57:49					
09470	102	82	1922 Mar 13	11:28:48	Penumbral	-1.4752	-0.8304	96.3			10:40:39	12:16:57					
09512	102	83	1940 Mar 23	19:48:19	Penumbral	-1.5033	-0.8803	74.6			19:11:01	20:25:37					
09553	102	84	1958 Apr 04	4:00:15	Penumbral	-1.5380	-0.9422	31.0			3:44:45	4:15:45					

== See also ==
- List of lunar eclipses
  - List of Saros series for lunar eclipses
