= Solar eclipse of April 19, 1958 =

20th-century annular solar eclipse

- Annular eclipse
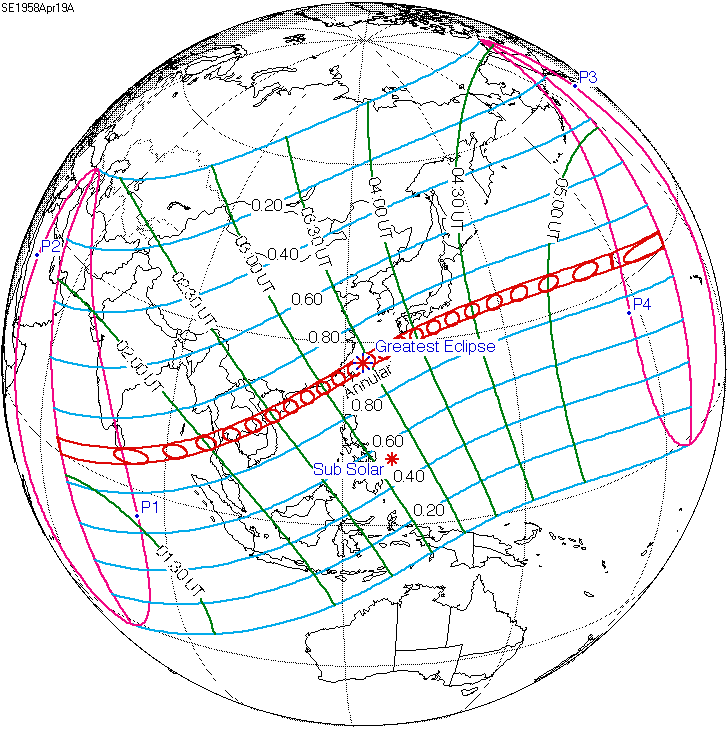
- Map
- Gamma: 0.275
- Magnitude: 0.9408

Maximum eclipse
- Duration: 427 s (7 min 7 s)
- Coordinates: 26.5°N 123.6°E
- Max. width of band: 228 km (142 mi)

Times (UTC)
- Greatest eclipse: 3:27:17

References
- Saros: 128 (55 of 73)
- Catalog # (SE5000): 9416

An annular solar eclipse occurred at the Moon's descending node of orbit on Saturday, April 19, 1958, with a magnitude of 0.9408. A solar eclipse occurs when the Moon passes between Earth and the Sun, thereby totally or partly obscuring the image of the Sun for a viewer on Earth. An annular solar eclipse occurs when the Moon's apparent diameter is smaller than the Sun's, blocking most of the Sun's light and causing the Sun to look like an annulus (ring). An annular eclipse appears as a partial eclipse over a region of the Earth thousands of kilometres wide. Occurring about 2.2 days after apogee (on April 16, 1958, at 22:40 UTC), the Moon's apparent diameter was smaller.

Annularity was visible in the Maldives, Nicobar Islands, Burma, Thailand including the capital city Bangkok, Cambodia, Laos, North Vietnam and South Vietnam (now belonging to Vietnam), China, British Hong Kong, Taiwan, Ryukyu Islands and Japan. Places east of International Date line witnessed the eclipse on April 18 (Friday). A partial eclipse was visible for most of Asia.

This was the last of four central solar eclipses visible from Bangkok from 1948 to 1958, where it is extremely rare for a large city to witness four central solar eclipses within 10 years.

== Observation ==
Compared with a total solar eclipse, the chromosphere, corona and solar prominence are invisible during an annular eclipse. However, observations of millimeter-wave solar radio can provide data for lower- and mid-layer structure of the chromosphere, which is more valuable during an annular solar eclipse.

=== China ===
A joint observation team formed by the Academy of Sciences of the Soviet Union (predecessor of today's Russian Academy of Sciences) and the Chinese Academy of Sciences conducted 8-millimeter radio observation in Sanya, Hainan Island, China using the equatorial parabolic radio telescope manufactured by the Lebedev Physical Institute and the dual-channel radiometer as a receiver. Radio astronomy started to develop from then in China. Due to the Sino-Soviet split soon after this eclipse, the two countries did not conduct any joint observations of the total solar eclipse of September 22, 1968. On January 23, 1969, the People's Daily published an article reporting the observation of the eclipse in 1968, where it also criticized that the Soviet Union "plundered data of the annular solar eclipse" in 1958, only left China a "worn radio telescope antenna", and later even asked for it back.

=== Japan ===
Observation ships were sent to Hachijō-jima, Izu Islands, Japan. Pictures were also taken in Tanegashima, Osumi Islands, and luminosity, air pressure, temperature, humidity, water temperature of the storage tank, ground temperature, wind direction, wind speed and other data were recorded every 10 minutes.

== Eclipse details ==
Shown below are two tables displaying details about this particular solar eclipse. The first table outlines times at which the Moon's penumbra or umbra attains the specific parameter, and the second table describes various other parameters pertaining to this eclipse.

April 19, 1958 Solar Eclipse Times
Event	Time (UTC)
First Penumbral External Contact	1958 April 19 at 00:24:41.6 UTC
First Umbral External Contact	1958 April 19 at 01:30:53.9 UTC
First Central Line	1958 April 19 at 01:33:33.8 UTC
First Umbral Internal Contact	1958 April 19 at 01:36:14.1 UTC
First Penumbral Internal Contact	1958 April 19 at 02:47:56.9 UTC
Ecliptic Conjunction	1958 April 19 at 03:23:59.6 UTC
Greatest Eclipse	1958 April 19 at 03:27:16.7 UTC
Greatest Duration	1958 April 19 at 03:33:53.0 UTC
Equatorial Conjunction	1958 April 19 at 03:36:02.5 UTC
Last Penumbral Internal Contact	1958 April 19 at 04:06:22.2 UTC
Last Umbral Internal Contact	1958 April 19 at 05:18:13.8 UTC
Last Central Line	1958 April 19 at 05:20:52.8 UTC
Last Umbral External Contact	1958 April 19 at 05:23:31.5 UTC
Last Penumbral External Contact	1958 April 19 at 06:29:44.7 UTC

April 19, 1958 Solar Eclipse Parameters
Parameter	Value
Eclipse Magnitude	0.94082
Eclipse Obscuration	0.88515
Gamma	0.27499
Sun Right Ascension	01h46m12.4s
Sun Declination	+10°58'10.3"
Sun Semi-Diameter	15'55.4"
Sun Equatorial Horizontal Parallax	08.8"
Moon Right Ascension	01h45m56.6s
Moon Declination	+11°12'31.2"
Moon Semi-Diameter	14'45.9"
Moon Equatorial Horizontal Parallax	0°54'11.2"
ΔT	32.3 s

== Eclipse season ==
This eclipse is part of an eclipse season, a period, roughly every six months, when eclipses occur. Only two (or occasionally three) eclipse seasons occur each year, and each season lasts about 35 days and repeats just short of six months (173 days) later; thus two full eclipse seasons always occur each year. Either two or three eclipses happen each eclipse season. In the sequence below, each eclipse is separated by a fortnight. The first and last eclipse in this sequence is separated by one synodic month.

Eclipse season of April–May 1958
April 4 Ascending node (full moon)	April 19 Descending node (new moon)	May 3 Ascending node (full moon)
Penumbral lunar eclipse Lunar Saros 102	Annular solar eclipse Solar Saros 128	Partial lunar eclipse Lunar Saros 140

== Related eclipses ==
=== Eclipses in 1958 ===
- A penumbral lunar eclipse on April 4.
- An annular solar eclipse on April 19.
- A partial lunar eclipse on May 3.
- A total solar eclipse on October 12.
- A penumbral lunar eclipse on October 27.

=== Metonic ===
- Preceded by: Solar eclipse of June 30, 1954
- Followed by: Solar eclipse of February 5, 1962

=== Tzolkinex ===
- Preceded by: Solar eclipse of March 7, 1951
- Followed by: Solar eclipse of May 30, 1965

=== Half-Saros ===
- Preceded by: Lunar eclipse of April 13, 1949
- Followed by: Lunar eclipse of April 24, 1967

=== Tritos ===
- Preceded by: Solar eclipse of May 20, 1947
- Followed by: Solar eclipse of March 18, 1969

=== Solar Saros 128 ===
- Preceded by: Solar eclipse of April 7, 1940
- Followed by: Solar eclipse of April 29, 1976

=== Inex ===
- Preceded by: Solar eclipse of May 9, 1929
- Followed by: Solar eclipse of March 29, 1987

=== Triad ===
- Preceded by: Solar eclipse of June 18, 1871
- Followed by: Solar eclipse of February 16, 2045

=== Solar eclipses of 1957–1960 ===
This eclipse is a member of a semester series. An eclipse in a semester series of solar eclipses repeats approximately every 177 days and 4 hours (a semester) at alternating nodes of the Moon's orbit.

Solar eclipse series sets from 1957 to 1960
Descending node			Ascending node		
Saros	Map	Gamma	Saros	Map	Gamma
118	April 30, 1957 Annular (non-central)	0.9992	123	October 23, 1957 Total (non-central)	1.0022
128	April 19, 1958 Annular	0.275	133	October 12, 1958 Total	−0.2951
138	April 8, 1959 Annular	−0.4546	143	October 2, 1959 Total	0.4207
148	March 27, 1960 Partial	−1.1537	153	September 20, 1960 Partial	1.2057

=== Saros 128 ===
This eclipse is a part of Saros series 128, repeating every 18 years, 11 days, and containing 73 events. The series started with a partial solar eclipse on August 29, 984 AD. It contains total eclipses from May 16, 1417 through June 18, 1471; hybrid eclipses from June 28, 1489 through July 31, 1543; and annular eclipses from August 11, 1561 through July 25, 2120. The series ends at member 73 as a partial eclipse on November 1, 2282. Its eclipses are tabulated in three columns; every third eclipse in the same column is one exeligmos apart, so they all cast shadows over approximately the same parts of the Earth.

The longest duration of totality was produced by member 27 at 1 minutes, 45 seconds on June 7, 1453, and the longest duration of annularity was produced by member 48 at 8 minutes, 35 seconds on February 1, 1832. All eclipses in this series occur at the Moon’s descending node of orbit.

Series members 47–68 occur between 1801 and 2200:
47	48	49
January 21, 1814	February 1, 1832	February 12, 1850
50	51	52
February 23, 1868	March 5, 1886	March 17, 1904
53	54	55
March 28, 1922	April 7, 1940	April 19, 1958
56	57	58
April 29, 1976	May 10, 1994	May 20, 2012
59	60	61
June 1, 2030	June 11, 2048	June 22, 2066
62	63	64
July 3, 2084	July 15, 2102	July 25, 2120
65	66	67
August 5, 2138	August 16, 2156	August 27, 2174
68
September 6, 2192

=== Metonic series ===
The metonic series repeats eclipses every 19 years (6939.69 days), lasting about 5 cycles. Eclipses occur in nearly the same calendar date. In addition, the octon subseries repeats 1/5 of that or every 3.8 years (1387.94 days). All eclipses in this table occur at the Moon's descending node.

22 eclipse events between September 12, 1931 and July 1, 2011
September 11–12	June 30–July 1	April 17–19	February 4–5	November 22–23
114	116	118	120	122
September 12, 1931	June 30, 1935	April 19, 1939	February 4, 1943	November 23, 1946
124	126	128	130	132
September 12, 1950	June 30, 1954	April 19, 1958	February 5, 1962	November 23, 1965
134	136	138	140	142
September 11, 1969	June 30, 1973	April 18, 1977	February 4, 1981	November 22, 1984
144	146	148	150	152
September 11, 1988	June 30, 1992	April 17, 1996	February 5, 2000	November 23, 2003
154	156			
September 11, 2007	July 1, 2011			

=== Tritos series ===
This eclipse is a part of a tritos cycle, repeating at alternating nodes every 135 synodic months (≈ 3986.63 days, or 11 years minus 1 month). Their appearance and longitude are irregular due to a lack of synchronization with the anomalistic month (period of perigee), but groupings of 3 tritos cycles (≈ 33 years minus 3 months) come close (≈ 434.044 anomalistic months), so eclipses are similar in these groupings.

Series members between 1801 and 2200
June 26, 1805 (Saros 114)	May 27, 1816 (Saros 115)	April 26, 1827 (Saros 116)	March 25, 1838 (Saros 117)	February 23, 1849 (Saros 118)
January 23, 1860 (Saros 119)	December 22, 1870 (Saros 120)	November 21, 1881 (Saros 121)	October 20, 1892 (Saros 122)	September 21, 1903 (Saros 123)
August 21, 1914 (Saros 124)	July 20, 1925 (Saros 125)	June 19, 1936 (Saros 126)	May 20, 1947 (Saros 127)	April 19, 1958 (Saros 128)
March 18, 1969 (Saros 129)	February 16, 1980 (Saros 130)	January 15, 1991 (Saros 131)	December 14, 2001 (Saros 132)	November 13, 2012 (Saros 133)
October 14, 2023 (Saros 134)	September 12, 2034 (Saros 135)	August 12, 2045 (Saros 136)	July 12, 2056 (Saros 137)	June 11, 2067 (Saros 138)
May 11, 2078 (Saros 139)	April 10, 2089 (Saros 140)	March 10, 2100 (Saros 141)	February 8, 2111 (Saros 142)	January 8, 2122 (Saros 143)
December 7, 2132 (Saros 144)	November 7, 2143 (Saros 145)	October 7, 2154 (Saros 146)	September 5, 2165 (Saros 147)	August 4, 2176 (Saros 148)
July 6, 2187 (Saros 149)	June 4, 2198 (Saros 150)			

=== Inex series ===
This eclipse is a part of the long period inex cycle, repeating at alternating nodes, every 358 synodic months (≈ 10,571.95 days, or 29 years minus 20 days). Their appearance and longitude are irregular due to a lack of synchronization with the anomalistic month (period of perigee). However, groupings of 3 inex cycles (≈ 87 years minus 2 months) comes close (≈ 1,151.02 anomalistic months), so eclipses are similar in these groupings.

Series members between 1801 and 2200
July 27, 1813 (Saros 123)	July 8, 1842 (Saros 124)	June 18, 1871 (Saros 125)
May 28, 1900 (Saros 126)	May 9, 1929 (Saros 127)	April 19, 1958 (Saros 128)
March 29, 1987 (Saros 129)	March 9, 2016 (Saros 130)	February 16, 2045 (Saros 131)
January 27, 2074 (Saros 132)	January 8, 2103 (Saros 133)	December 19, 2131 (Saros 134)
November 27, 2160 (Saros 135)	November 8, 2189 (Saros 136)	
