= April 1958 lunar eclipse =

Penumbral lunar eclipse April 4, 1958

- Penumbral eclipse
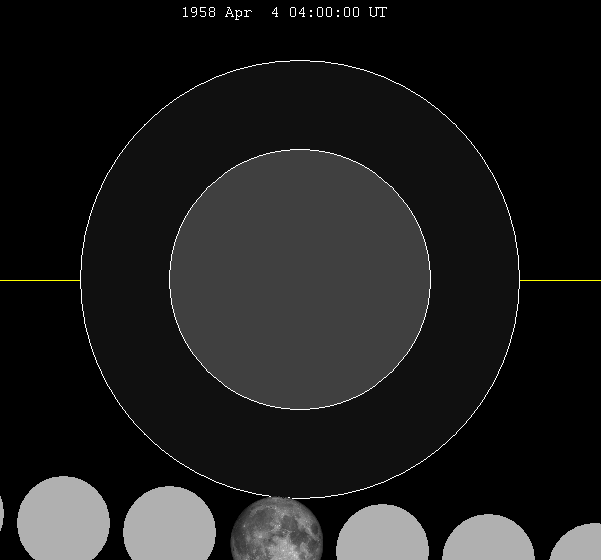
- The Moon's hourly motion shown right to left
- Date: April 4, 1958
- Gamma: −1.5381
- Magnitude: −0.9421
- Saros cycle: 102 (84 of 84)
- Penumbral: 31 minutes, 2 seconds
Contacts (UTC)
- P1: 3:44:10
- Greatest: 3:59:43
- P4: 4:15:12

A penumbral lunar eclipse occurred at the Moon’s ascending node of orbit on Friday, April 4, 1958, with an umbral magnitude of −0.9421. A lunar eclipse occurs when the Moon moves into the Earth's shadow, causing the Moon to be darkened. A penumbral lunar eclipse occurs when part or all of the Moon's near side passes into the Earth's penumbra. Unlike a solar eclipse, which can only be viewed from a relatively small area of the world, a lunar eclipse may be viewed from anywhere on the night side of Earth. Occurring only about 16.5 hours before perigee (on April 3, 1958, at 20:30 UTC), the Moon's apparent diameter was larger.

This was the last penumbral lunar eclipse in Lunar Saros 102. In this extremely marginal eclipse, the Moon barely clipped the edge of the Earth's penumbral shadow. This caused a microscopic darkening of just 1% of the Moon's disc for about 31 minutes, which was essentially impossible to see.

== Visibility ==
The eclipse was completely visible over North America, South America, most of Africa and western Europe.

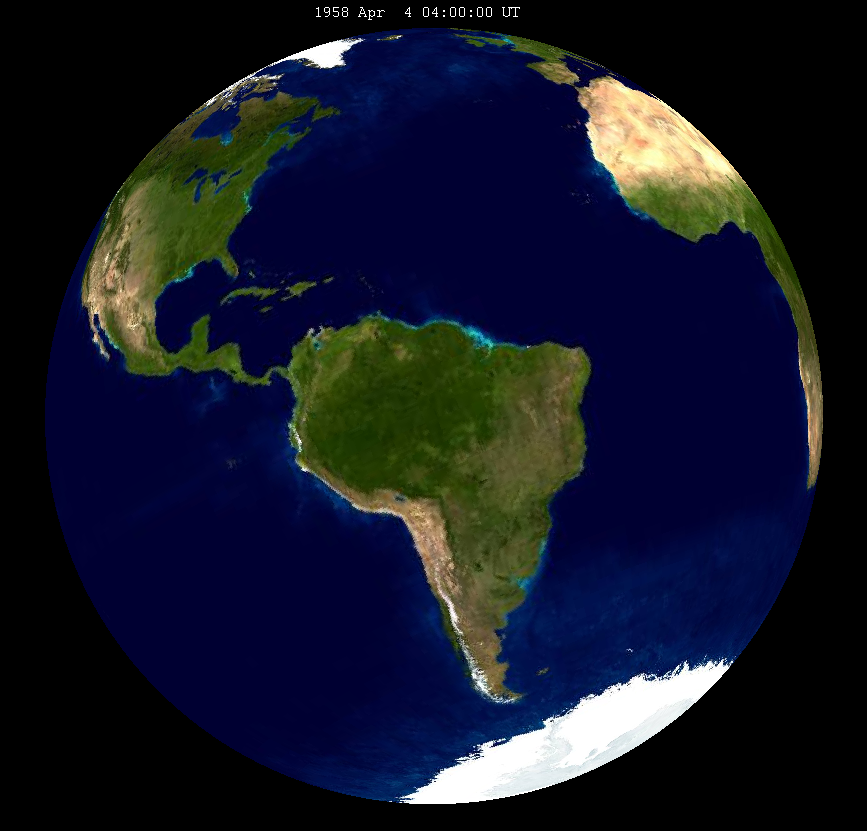
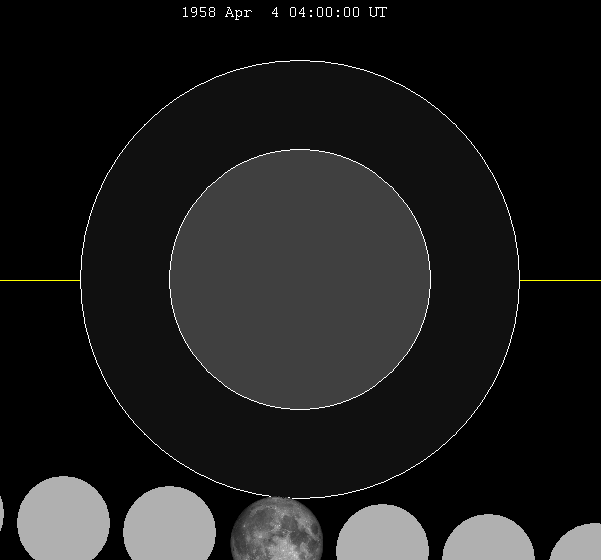

== Eclipse details ==
Shown below is a table displaying details about this particular lunar eclipse. It describes various parameters pertaining to this eclipse.

April 4, 1958, Lunar Eclipse Parameters
Parameter	Value
Penumbral Magnitude	0.01359
Umbral Magnitude	−0.94211
Gamma	−1.53805
Sun Right Ascension	00h51m06.5s
Sun Declination	+05°28'40.0"
Sun Semi-Diameter	15'59.5"
Sun Equatorial Horizontal Parallax	08.8"
Moon Right Ascension	12h49m12.4s
Moon Declination	-06°58'45.5"
Moon Semi-Diameter	16'43.9"
Moon Equatorial Horizontal Parallax	1°01'24.6"
ΔT	32.4 s

== Eclipse season ==
This eclipse is part of an eclipse season, a period, roughly every six months, when eclipses occur. Only two (or occasionally three) eclipse seasons occur each year, and each season lasts about 35 days and repeats just short of six months (173 days) later; thus two full eclipse seasons always occur each year. Either two or three eclipses happen each eclipse season. In the sequence below, each eclipse is separated by a fortnight. The first and last eclipse in this sequence is separated by one synodic month.

Eclipse season of April–May 1958
April 4 Ascending node (full moon)	April 19 Descending node (new moon)	May 3 Ascending node (full moon)
Penumbral lunar eclipse Lunar Saros 102	Annular solar eclipse Solar Saros 128	Partial lunar eclipse Lunar Saros 140

== Related eclipses ==
=== Eclipses in 1958 ===
- A penumbral lunar eclipse on April 4.
- An annular solar eclipse on April 19.
- A partial lunar eclipse on May 3.
- A total solar eclipse on October 12.
- A penumbral lunar eclipse on October 27.

=== Tzolkinex ===
- Preceded by: Lunar eclipse of February 21, 1951

=== Lunar Saros 102 ===
- Preceded by: Lunar eclipse of March 23, 1940

=== Lunar eclipses of 1958–1962 ===
This eclipse is a member of a semester series. An eclipse in a semester series of lunar eclipses repeats approximately every 177 days and 4 hours (a semester) at alternating nodes of the Moon's orbit.

The lunar eclipses on May 3, 1958 (partial) and October 28, 1958 (penumbral) occur in the previous lunar year eclipse set, and the penumbral lunar eclipse on July 17, 1962 occurs in the next lunar year eclipse set.

Lunar eclipse series sets from 1958 to 1962
Ascending node				Descending node			
Saros	Date Viewing	Type Chart	Gamma	Saros	Date Viewing	Type Chart	Gamma
102	1958 Apr 04	Penumbral	−1.5381				
112	1959 Mar 24	Partial	−0.8757	117	1959 Sep 17	Penumbral	1.0296
122	1960 Mar 13	Total	−0.1799	127	1960 Sep 05	Total	0.2422
132	1961 Mar 02	Partial	0.5541	137	1961 Aug 26	Partial	−0.4895
142	1962 Feb 19	Penumbral	1.2512	147	1962 Aug 15	Penumbral	−1.2210

=== Saros 102 ===
This eclipse is a part of Saros series 102, repeating every 18 years, 11 days, and containing 84 events. The series started with a penumbral lunar eclipse on October 5, 461 AD. It contains partial eclipses from May 20, 840, through July 13, 930; total eclipses from July 23, 948, through April 20, 1399; and a second set of partial eclipses from May 1, 1417, through July 16, 1543. The series ends at member 84 as a penumbral eclipse on April 4, 1958.

The longest duration of totality was produced by member 36 at 104 minutes, 43 seconds, on October 7, 1074. All eclipses in this series occur at the Moon’s ascending node of orbit.

Greatest	First			
The greatest eclipse of the series occurred on 1074 Oct 07, lasting 104 minutes, 43 seconds.	Penumbral	Partial	Total	Central
The greatest eclipse of the series occurred on 1074 Oct 07, lasting 104 minutes, 43 seconds.	461 Oct 05	840 May 20	948 Jul 23	984 Aug 14
The greatest eclipse of the series occurred on 1074 Oct 07, lasting 104 minutes, 43 seconds.	Last			
The greatest eclipse of the series occurred on 1074 Oct 07, lasting 104 minutes, 43 seconds.	Central	Total	Partial	Penumbral
The greatest eclipse of the series occurred on 1074 Oct 07, lasting 104 minutes, 43 seconds.	1345 Mar 18	1399 Apr 20	1543 Jul 16	1958 Apr 04

Eclipses are tabulated in three columns; every third eclipse in the same column is one exeligmos apart, so they all cast shadows over approximately the same parts of the Earth.

Series members 76–84 occur between 1801 and 1958:
76	77	78
1814 Jan 06	1832 Jan 17	1850 Jan 28
79	80	81
1868 Feb 08	1886 Feb 18	1904 Mar 02
82	83	84
1922 Mar 13	1940 Mar 23	1958 Apr 04

== See also ==
- List of lunar eclipses
- List of 20th-century lunar eclipses
