= Solar eclipse of October 14, 2023 =

Annular solar eclipse

- Annular eclipse
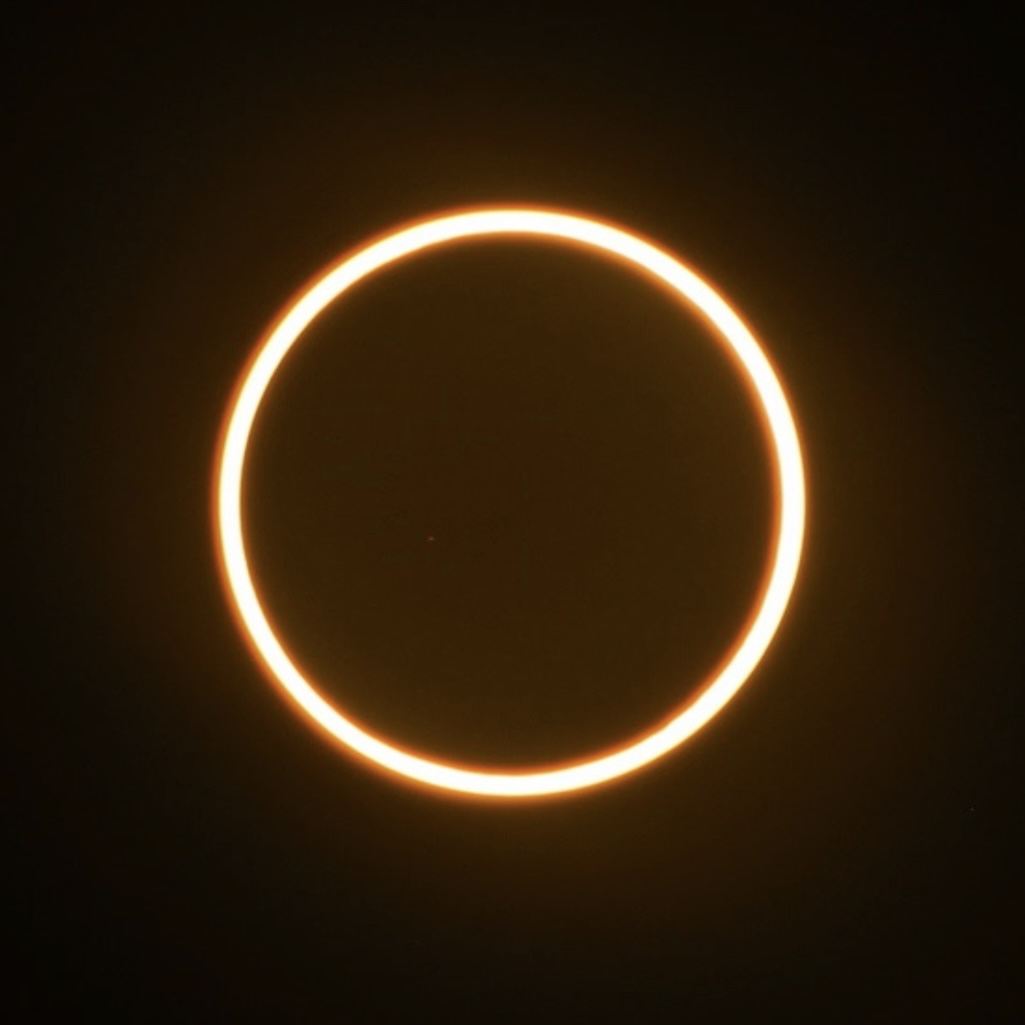
- Annularity as viewed from Mexican Hat, Utah, USA

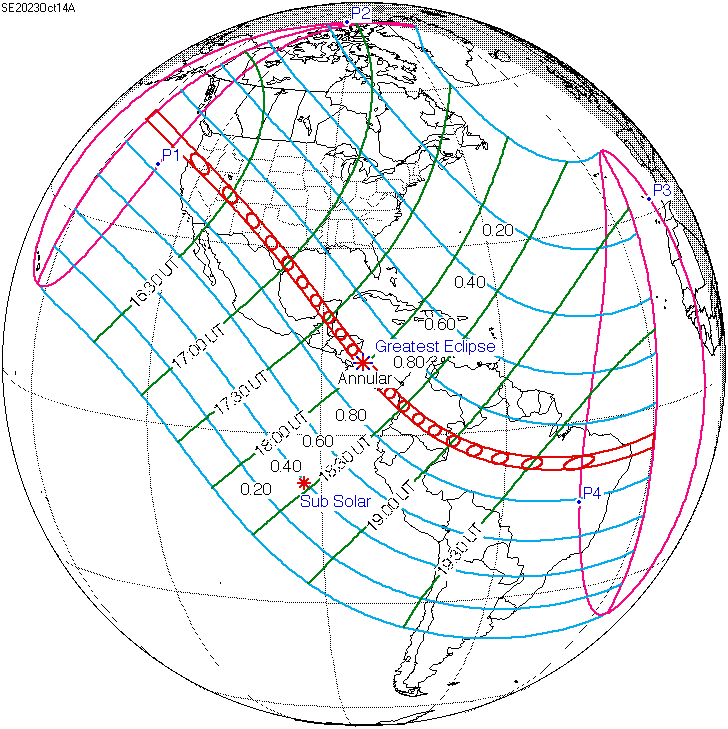
- Map
- Gamma: 0.3753
- Magnitude: 0.952

Maximum eclipse
- Duration: 317 s (5 min 17 s)
- Coordinates: 11.4°N 83.1°W
- Max. width of band: 187 km (116 mi)

Times (UTC)
- Greatest eclipse: 18:00:41

References
- Saros: 134 (44 of 71)
- Catalog # (SE5000): 9560

An annular solar eclipse occurred at the Moon’s descending node of orbit on Saturday, October 14, 2023, with a magnitude of 0.952. A solar eclipse occurs when the Moon passes between Earth and the Sun, thereby totally or partly obscuring the image of the Sun for a viewer on Earth. An annular solar eclipse occurs when the Moon's apparent diameter is smaller than the Sun's, blocking most of the Sun's light and causing the Sun to look like an annulus (ring). An annular eclipse appears as a partial eclipse over a region of the Earth thousands of kilometres wide. Occurring about 4.6 days after apogee (on October 10, 2023, at 4:40 UTC), the Moon's apparent diameter was smaller.

Annularity was visible from parts of Oregon, California, Nevada, extreme southwestern Idaho, Utah, Arizona, Colorado, New Mexico, and Texas in the United States, the Yucatán Peninsula, Belize, Honduras, Nicaragua, eastern coastal Costa Rica, Panama, Colombia, and Brazil. A partial eclipse was visible for most of North America, Central America, the Caribbean, and South America.

== Visibility ==
Animated map of the eclipse's path across North America and South America

=== United States ===
The path of the eclipse crossed the United States beginning in Oregon, entering at Dunes City, and passing over Newport, Crater Lake National Park, Eugene (passing over University of Oregon), and Medford. After passing over the northeast corner of California (in Modoc National Forest), it traveled through Nevada (passing over Black Rock Desert, Winnemucca and Elko) and Utah (passing over Canyonlands National Park, Glen Canyon National Recreation Area, and Bluff). After that, it covered the northeast corner of Arizona (including Kayenta) and the southwest corner of Colorado (including Cortez and the Ute Mountain Reservation). In New Mexico, it passed over Farmington, Albuquerque, Santa Fe, Roswell, Hobbs, and Carlsbad. Afterwards, it entered Texas, passing over Midland, Odessa, San Angelo, Kerrville, San Antonio and Corpus Christi before entering the Gulf of Mexico. This was the second annular eclipse visible from Albuquerque in 11 years, where it crossed the path of the May 2012 eclipse. It also coincided with the last day of the Albuquerque International Balloon Fiesta.

A total solar eclipse crossed the United States on April 8, 2024 (15 states) (Saros 139, Ascending Node), and a future total solar eclipse in the US will be on March 30, 2033, which will pass over Alaska. The next total eclipse in the contiguous United States of the US will be on August 22, 2044. The next total solar eclipse after that will cross on August 12, 2045 (13 states) (Saros 136, Descending Node). An annular solar eclipse will occur on June 11, 2048 (10 states) (Saros 128, Descending Node).

=== Mexico ===
In Mexico, the eclipse path passed over the Yucatán Peninsula, covering San Francisco de Campeche in Campeche, Oxkutzcab in Yucatán (coming close to Mérida), and Chetumal in Quintana Roo.

=== Western Caribbean ===
In Western Cuba, Cayman Islands, and Jamaica all saw a partial eclipse (50% and above). The greatest of the partial eclipse was seen over Western Cuba and the Cayman Islands.

=== Central America ===
In Guatemala, the eclipse passed over the extreme northeastern tip of Petén Department. In Belize, the eclipse passed over Belmopan and Belize City before leaving land again; when it entered in Honduras, it passed over La Ceiba and Catacamas, and in Nicaragua it passed over Bluefields. The point of greatest eclipse occurred near the coast of Nicaragua. After that, in Costa Rica it passed over Limon, and in Panama it passed over Santiago and came close to Panama City. Its point of greatest duration occurred just off the coast of Nata, Panama.

=== South America ===
In South America, the eclipse entered Colombia from the Pacific Ocean and passed over Pereira, Armenia, Cali, Ibagué and Neiva. In Brazil, it passed over the states of Amazonas (covering Fonte Boa, Tefé and Coari), Pará (covering Parauapebas and Xinguara), Tocantins (Araguaína) Maranhão (Balsas), Piauí (Picos), Ceará (Juazeiro do Norte), Pernambuco (Araripina), Paraíba (João Pessoa) and Rio Grande do Norte (Natal) before ending in the Atlantic Ocean.

== Eclipse timing ==
=== Places experiencing annular eclipse ===
Solar Eclipse of October 14, 2023 (Local Times)
Country or territory	City or place	Start of partial eclipse	Start of annular eclipse	Maximum eclipse	End of annular eclipse	End of partial eclipse	Duration of annularity (min:s)	Duration of eclipse (hr:min)	Maximum coverage
United States	Eugene	08:05:29	09:16:59	09:18:56	09:20:53	10:39:50	3:54	2:34	88.92%
United States	Farmington	09:11:44	10:31:53	10:34:02	10:36:12	12:04:59	4:19	2:53	89.63%
United States	Albuquerque	09:13:18	10:34:37	10:37:02	10:39:26	12:09:32	4:49	2:56	89.74%
United States	Santa Fe	09:13:38	10:36:07	10:37:29	10:38:51	12:09:57	2:44	2:56	89.74%
United States	Hobbs	09:17:10	10:41:15	10:43:42	10:46:09	12:18:58	4:54	3:02	89.92%
United States	Odessa	10:18:21	11:43:16	11:45:40	11:48:04	13:21:42	4:48	3:03	89.98%
United States	Midland	10:18:31	11:43:28	11:45:55	11:48:22	13:21:59	4:54	3:03	89.98%
United States	Uvalde	10:22:44	11:50:39	11:52:36	11:54:34	13:31:01	3:55	3:08	90.14%
United States	San Antonio	10:23:52	11:52:11	11:54:21	11:56:31	13:33:05	4:20	3:09	90.16%
United States	Corpus Christi	10:26:31	11:55:51	11:58:21	12:00:52	13:38:18	5:01	3:12	90.24%
Mexico	Chetumal	10:51:04	12:29:52	12:32:02	12:34:12	14:17:15	4:20	3:26	90.66%
Belize	Orange Walk Town	09:51:22	11:29:49	11:32:25	11:35:00	13:17:44	5:11	3:26	90.67%
Belize	Belmopan	09:52:32	11:32:16	11:33:48	11:35:21	13:19:17	3:05	3:27	90.69%
Belize	San Pedro Town	09:52:35	11:31:38	11:33:59	11:36:19	13:19:20	4:41	3:27	90.68%
Belize	Belize City	09:52:58	11:31:51	11:34:26	11:37:01	13:19:53	5:10	3:27	90.68%
Belize	Dangriga	09:53:53	11:33:20	11:35:33	11:37:47	13:21:06	4:27	3:27	90.70%
Honduras	Tela	09:57:19	11:37:55	11:39:49	11:41:43	13:25:32	3:48	3:28	90.73%
Honduras	La Ceiba	09:58:22	11:38:35	11:41:10	11:43:47	13:26:52	5:12	3:29	90.73%
Costa Rica	Limón	10:17:01	12:02:23	12:03:07	12:03:49	13:48:09	1:26	3:31	90.80%
Panama	Santiago de Veraguas	11:25:15	13:10:13	13:12:19	13:14:24	14:56:21	4:11	3:31	90.79%
Colombia	Buenaventura	11:43:24	13:29:32	13:31:15	13:32:59	15:12:05	3:27	3:29	90.71%
Colombia	Cali	11:45:45	13:31:45	13:33:35	13:35:26	15:13:54	3:41	3:28	90.69%
Brazil	Tefé	13:29:39	15:09:21	15:11:51	15:14:22	16:40:01	5:01	3:10	90.15%
Brazil	São Félix do Xingu	15:04:32	16:32:35	16:34:53	16:37:11	17:51:27	4:36	2:47	89.43%
Brazil	Araguaína	15:12:26	16:37:04	16:39:09	16:41:14	17:52:51	4:10	2:40	89.22%
Brazil	Balsas	15:16:35	16:39:33	16:41:14	16:42:56	17:53:22	3:23	2:41	89.10%
Brazil	Juàzeiro do Norte	15:26:03	16:43:13	16:45:08	16:47:05	17:30:51 (sunset)	3:52	2:05	88.73%
Brazil	Natal	15:29:31	16:43:57	16:45:45	16:47:33	17:13:34 (sunset)	3:36	1:44	88.52%
Brazil	Campina Grande	15:30:08	16:45:00	16:46:31	16:48:01	17:17:05 (sunset)	3:01	1:47	88.55%
Brazil	João Pessoa	15:31:05	16:45:13	16:46:45	16:48:16	17:13:03 (sunset)	3:03	1:42	88.50%

=== Places experiencing partial eclipse ===
Solar Eclipse of October 14, 2023 (Local Times)
Country or territory	City or place	Start of partial eclipse	Maximum eclipse	End of partial eclipse	Duration of eclipse (hr:min)	Maximum coverage
Canada	Vancouver	08:08:36	09:20:23	10:38:30	2:30	75.75%
United States	Los Angeles	08:07:59	09:24:36	10:50:11	2:42	70.84%
Canada	Calgary	09:14:21	10:27:01	11:45:19	2:31	60.81%
Mexico	Mexico City	09:36:36	11:09:33	12:50:31	3:14	69.80%
United States	Washington, D.C.	12:00:18	13:19:10	14:39:08	2:39	29.82%
Cuba	Havana	11:55:19	13:34:31	15:15:54	3:21	68.09%
Guatemala	Guatemala City	09:55:14	11:36:12	13:21:31	3:26	81.80%
Belize	Punta Gorda	09:54:39	11:36:19	13:21:56	3:27	89.38%
El Salvador	San Salvador	09:58:59	11:41:04	13:26:38	3:28	83.45%
Bahamas	Nassau	12:05:09	13:41:26	15:17:41	3:13	52.67%
Honduras	Tegucigalpa	10:01:05	11:44:16	13:30:04	3:29	89.40%
Cayman Islands	George Town	11:02:40	12:44:50	14:27:51	3:25	73.47%
Nicaragua	Managua	10:06:43	11:50:52	13:36:36	3:30	87.92%
Jamaica	Kingston	11:15:26	12:58:06	14:38:31	3:23	64.99%
Costa Rica	San José	10:15:18	12:00:57	13:46:11	3:31	88.82%
Haiti	Port-au-Prince	12:26:54	14:07:22	15:43:07	3:16	54.17%
Dominican Republic	Santo Domingo	12:34:20	14:13:24	15:46:22	3:12	49.62%
Panama	Panama City	11:26:08	13:13:23	14:56:59	3:31	90.23%
Colombia	Bogotá	11:48:28	13:36:19	15:15:25	3:27	88.41%
Ecuador	Quito	11:51:21	13:37:41	15:16:53	3:26	79.09%
Venezuela	Caracas	12:56:13	14:39:18	16:11:36	3:15	60.93%
Peru	Iquitos	12:11:16	13:56:12	15:30:23	3:19	80.35%
Peru	Lima	12:29:19	14:04:27	15:31:08	3:02	50.04%
Guyana	Georgetown	13:28:58	15:05:46	16:28:33	3:00	58.60%
Suriname	Paramaribo	14:38:59	16:12:56	17:32:45	2:54	58.70%
French Guiana	Cayenne	14:47:44	16:18:55	17:36:08	2:48	59.30%
Brazil	Manaus	13:40:37	15:19:30	16:43:40	3:03	88.31%
Bolivia	Riberalta	13:44:38	15:21:11	16:45:15	3:01	69.07%
Brazil	Belém	15:04:30	16:32:48	17:47:27	2:43	76.76%
Brazil	Brasília	15:25:43	16:45:41	17:55:00	2:29	63.10%

== Gallery ==
=== Videos and animations ===
Animation of the Moon's shadow moving across Earth; captured from the GOES-16 satellite.

Annular Eclipse timelapse video from Petroglyph National Monument, Albuquerque, New Mexico

=== Annularity ===
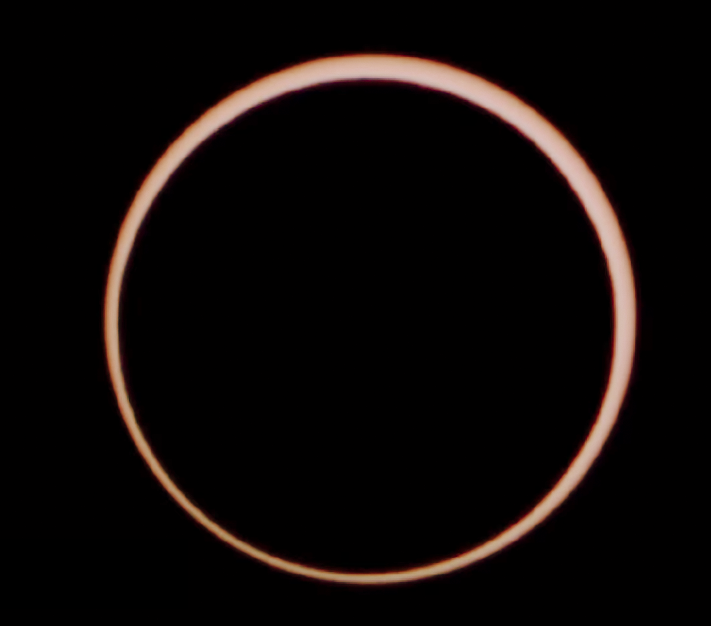
Juazeiro do Norte, Brazil

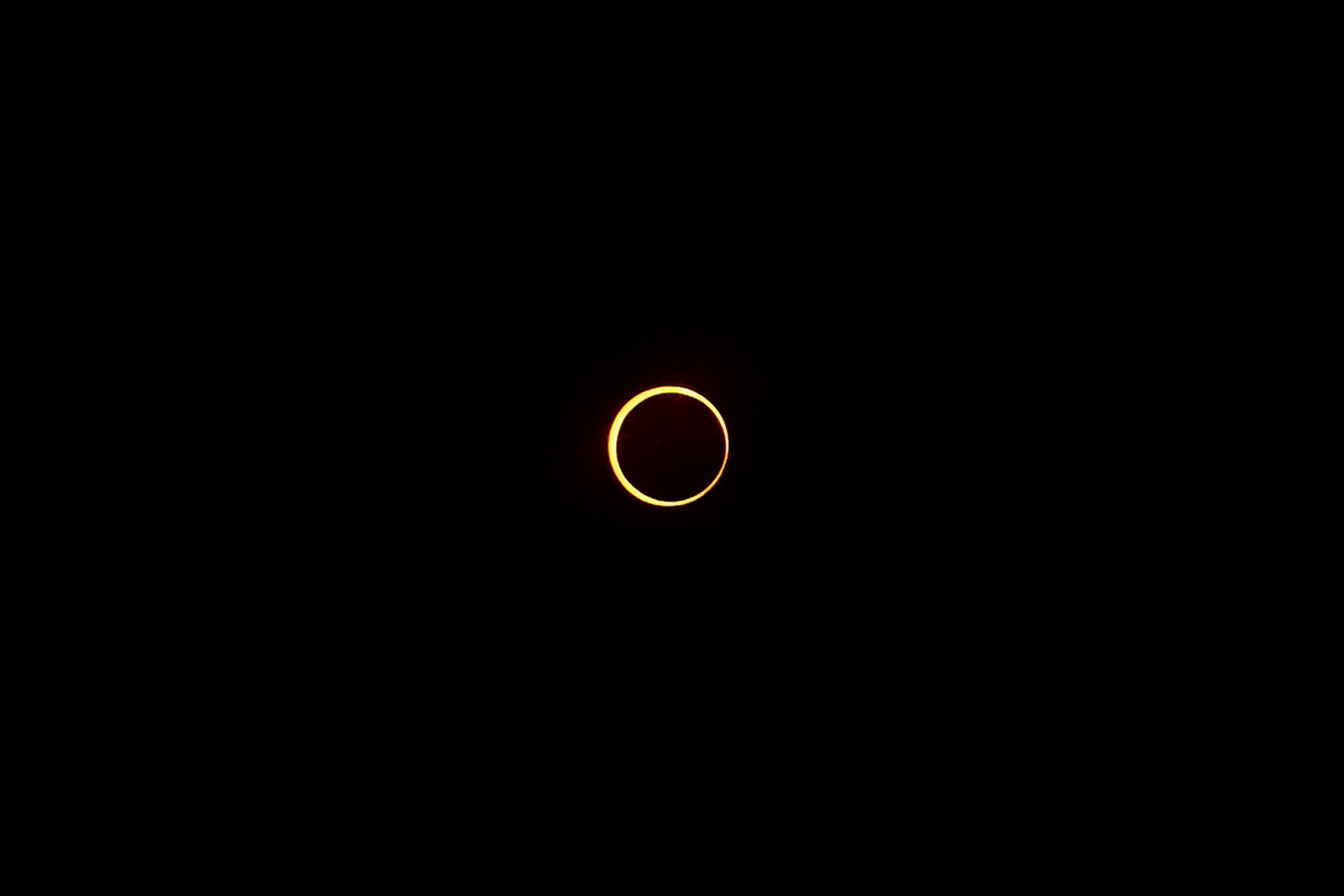
Limón, Costa Rica

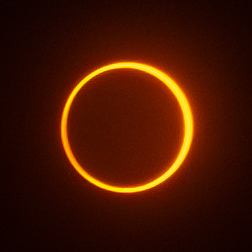
Campeche City, Mexico

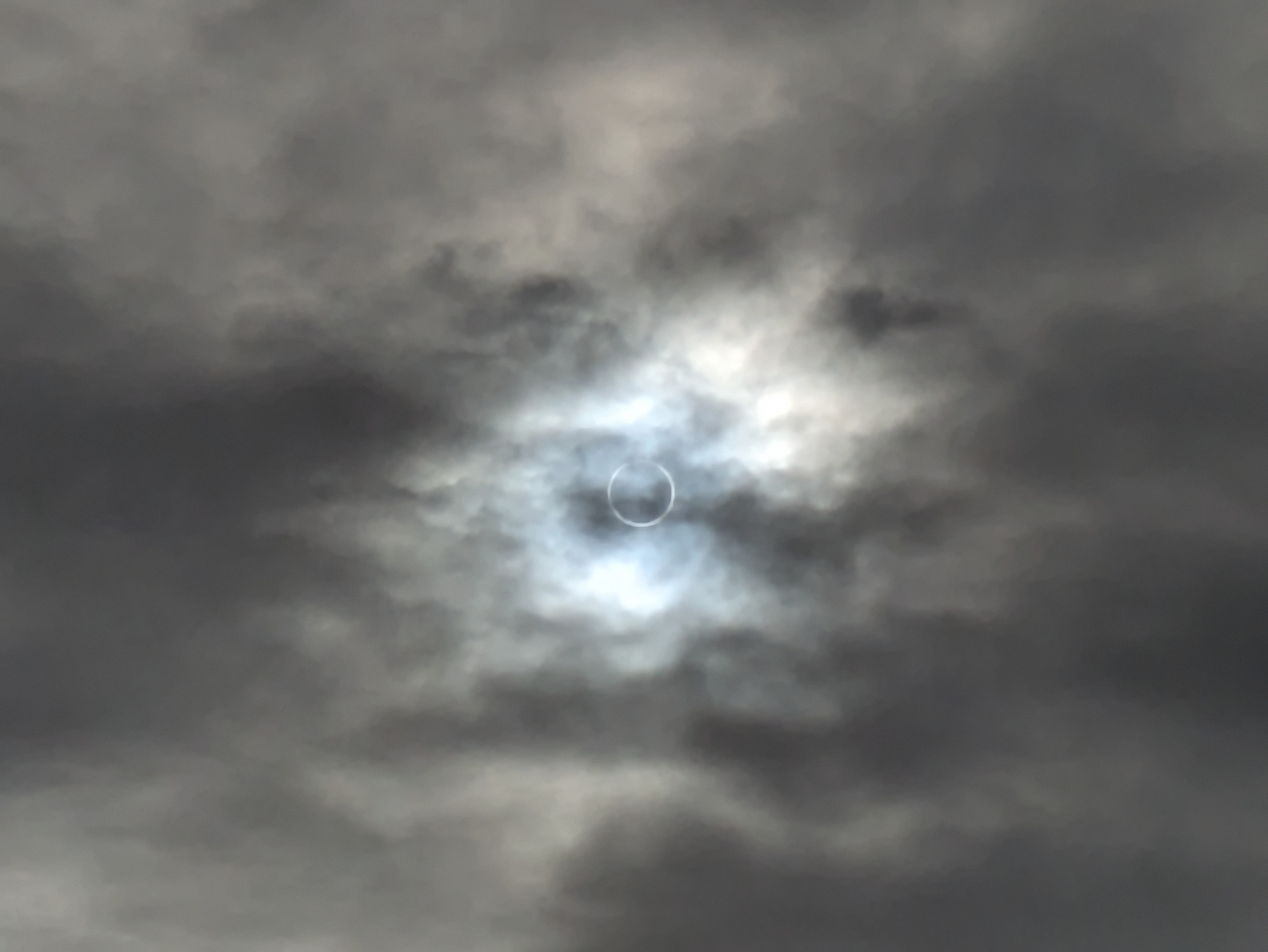
Winnemucca, Nevada

Hobbs, New Mexico

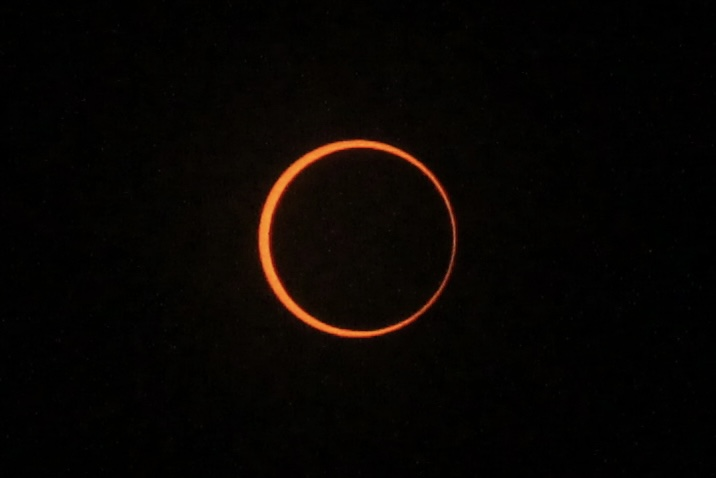
Los Alamos, New Mexico

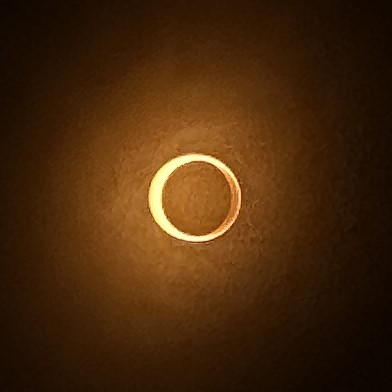
Villanueva, New Mexico

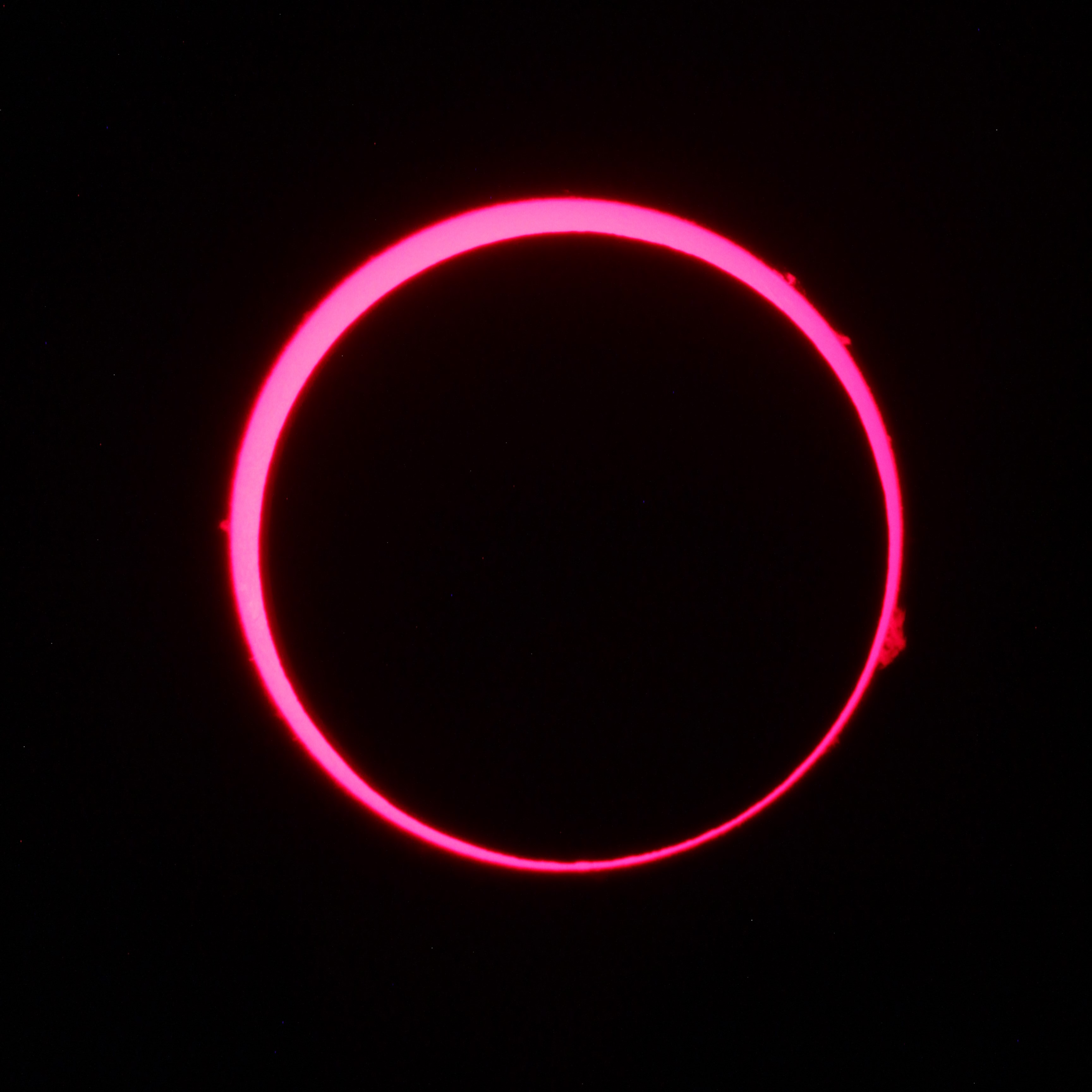
In the H-Alpha part of the spectrum. White Rock, New Mexico

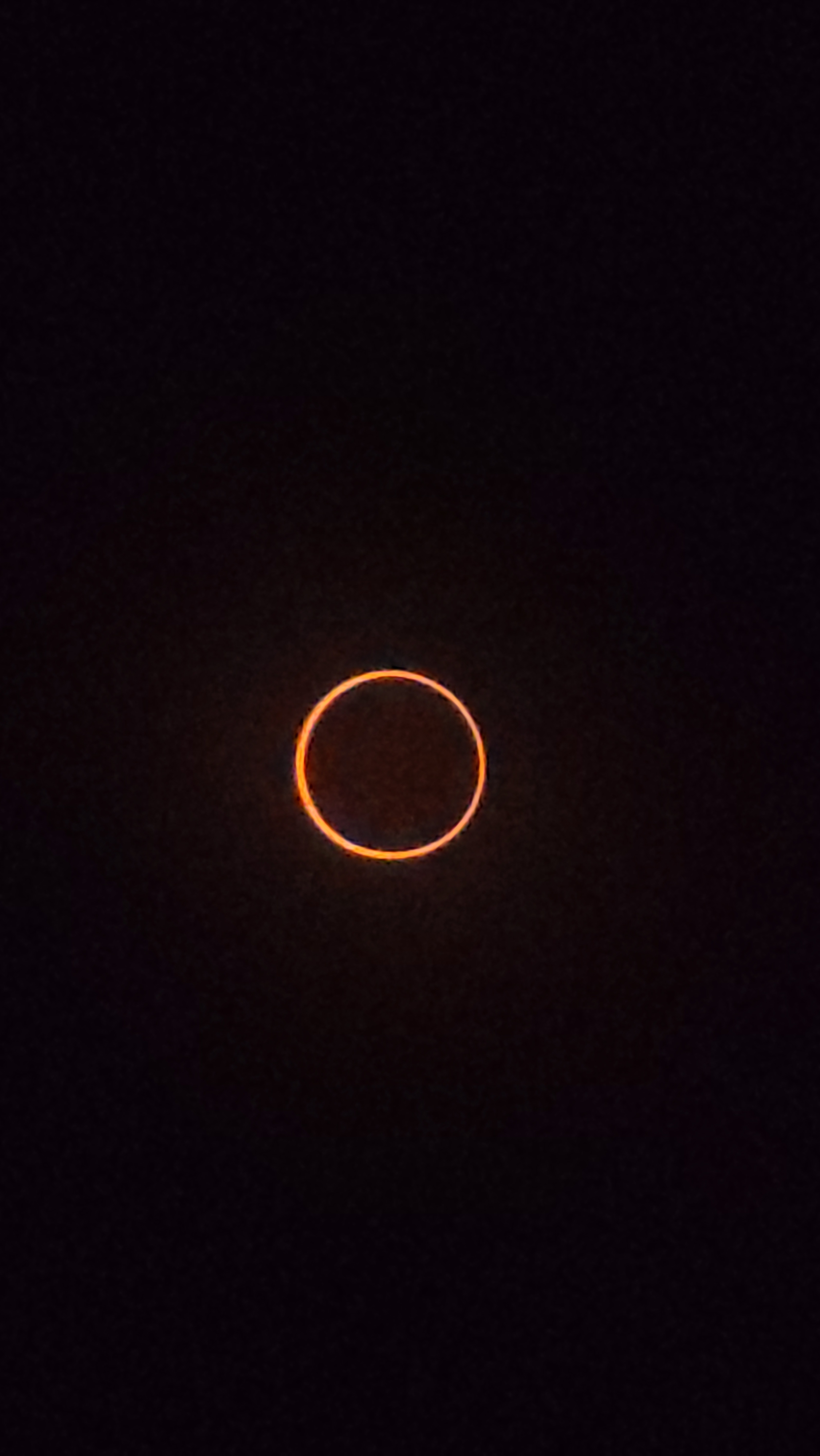
Fillmore, Utah

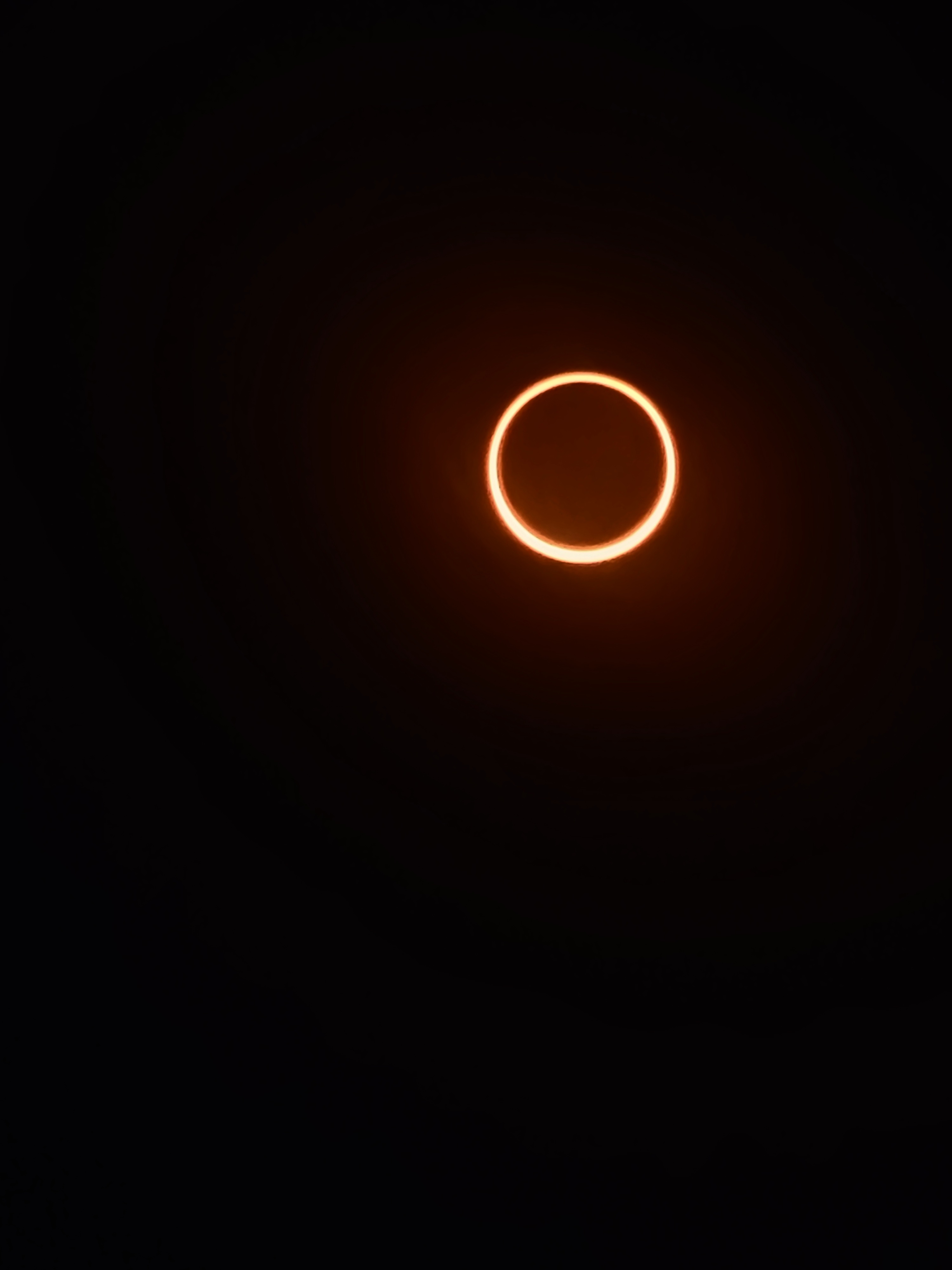
Albuquerque, New Mexico

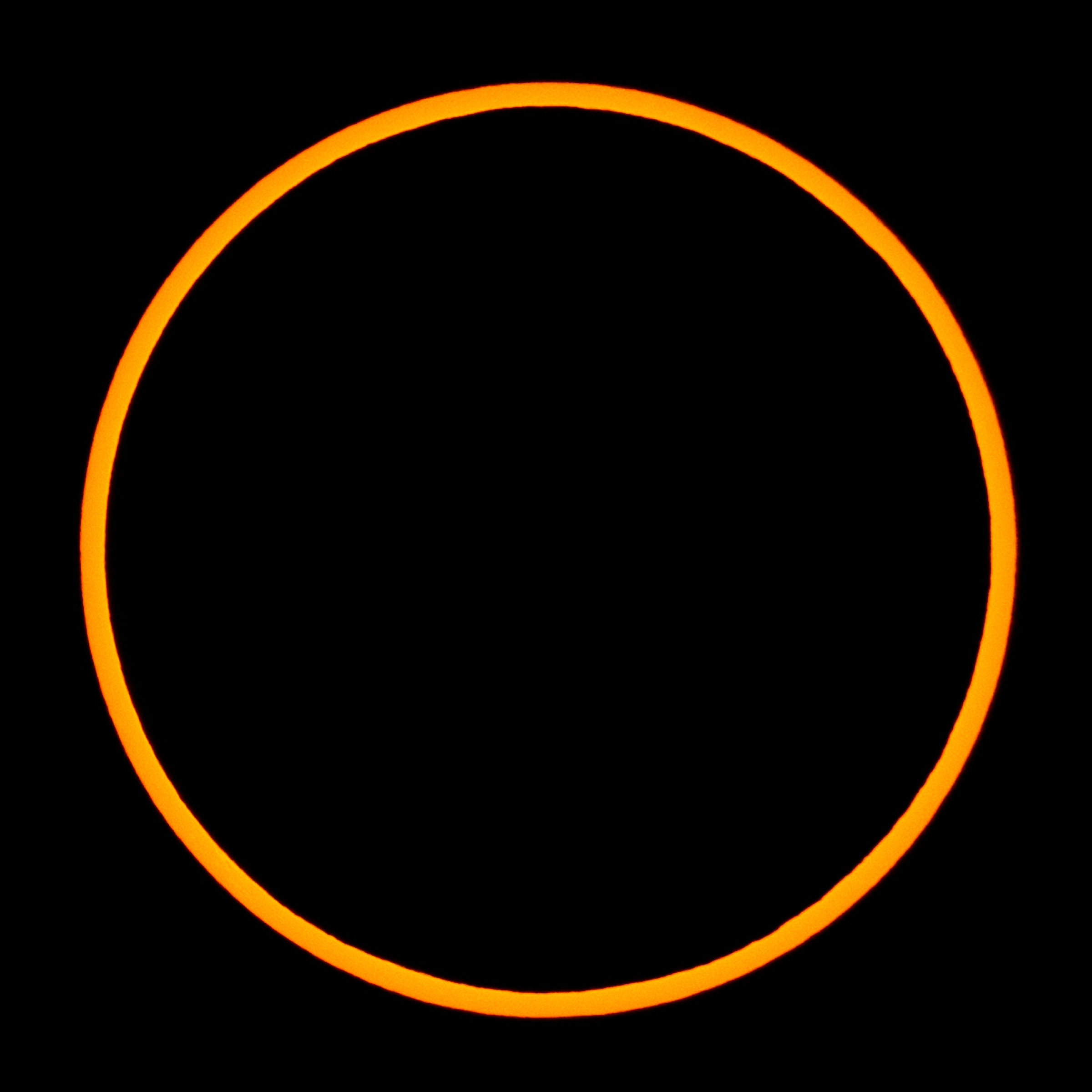
October 14th, 2023 Annular Eclipse from Mountain Home, Texas.

=== Partiality ===
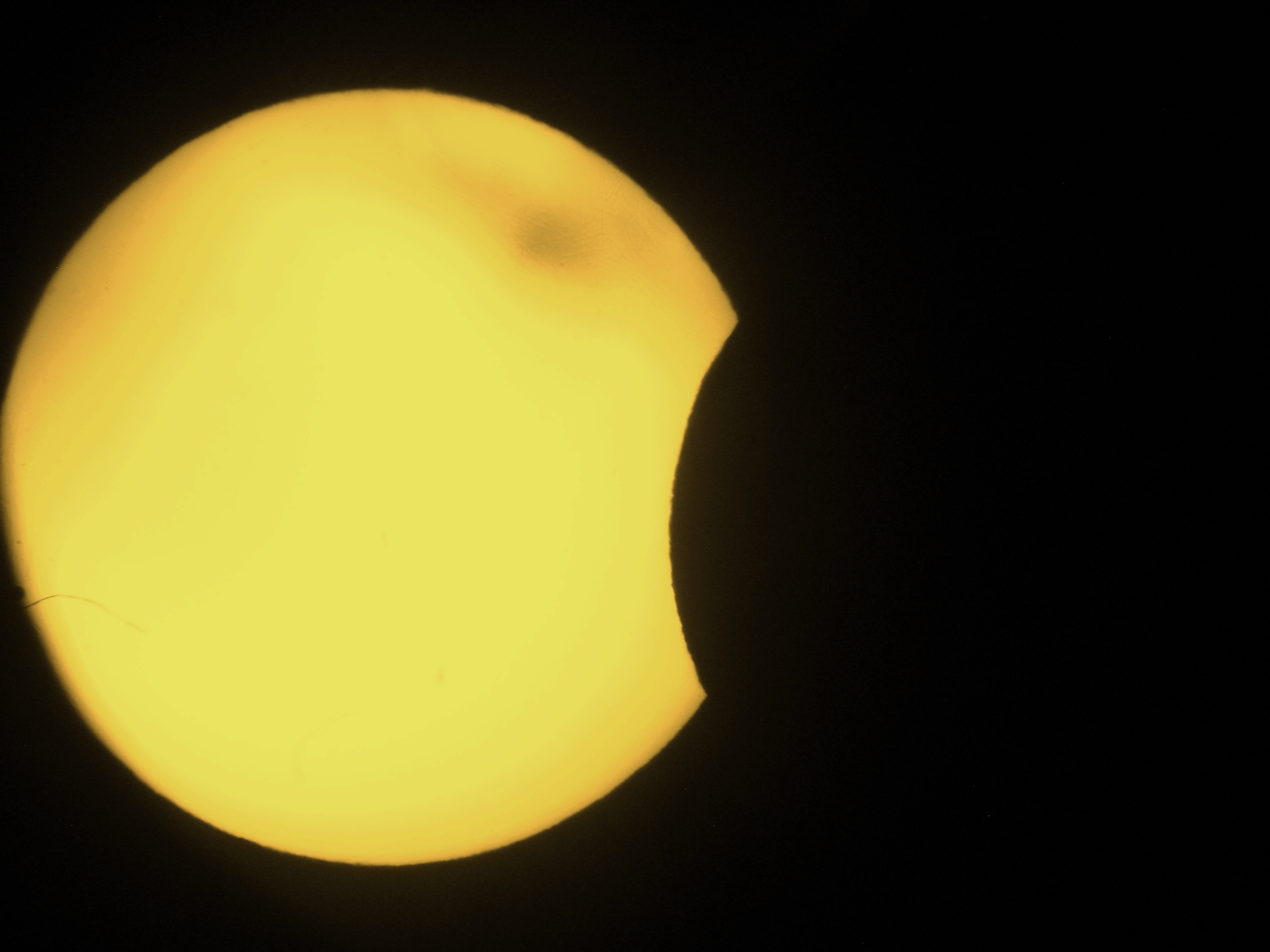
Ciudad Jardín, Argentina

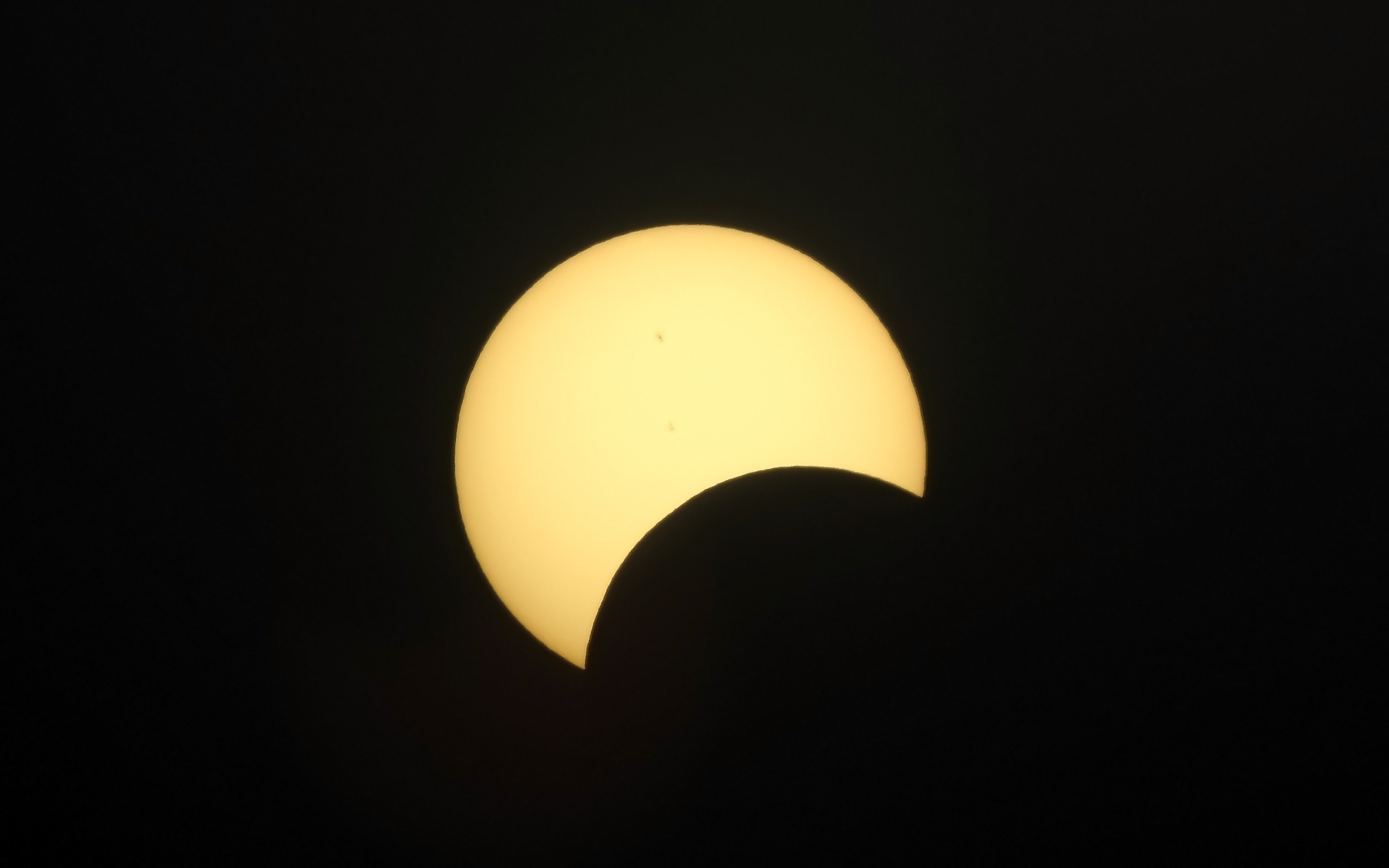
Floriano, Brazil

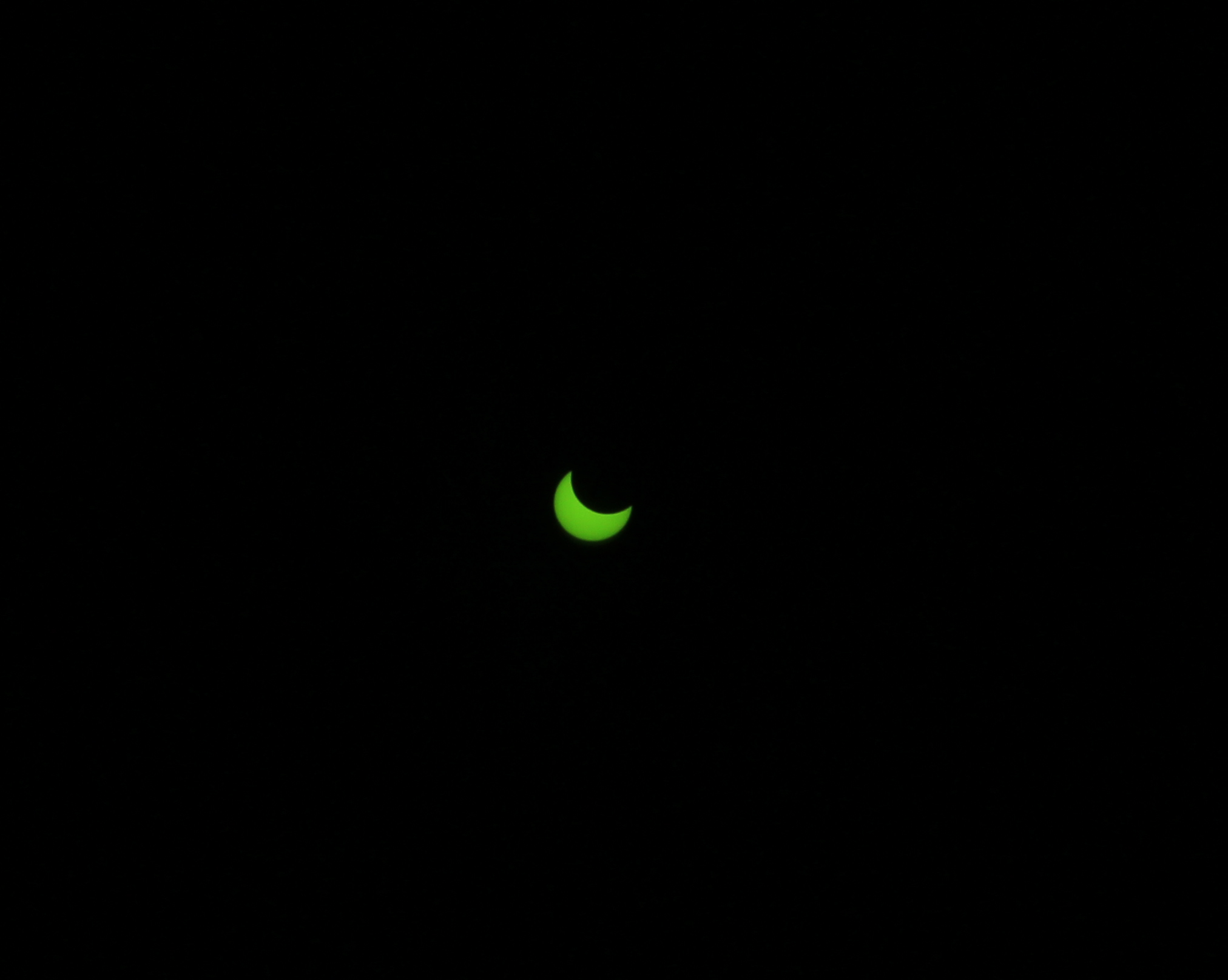
Ilhéus, Brazil

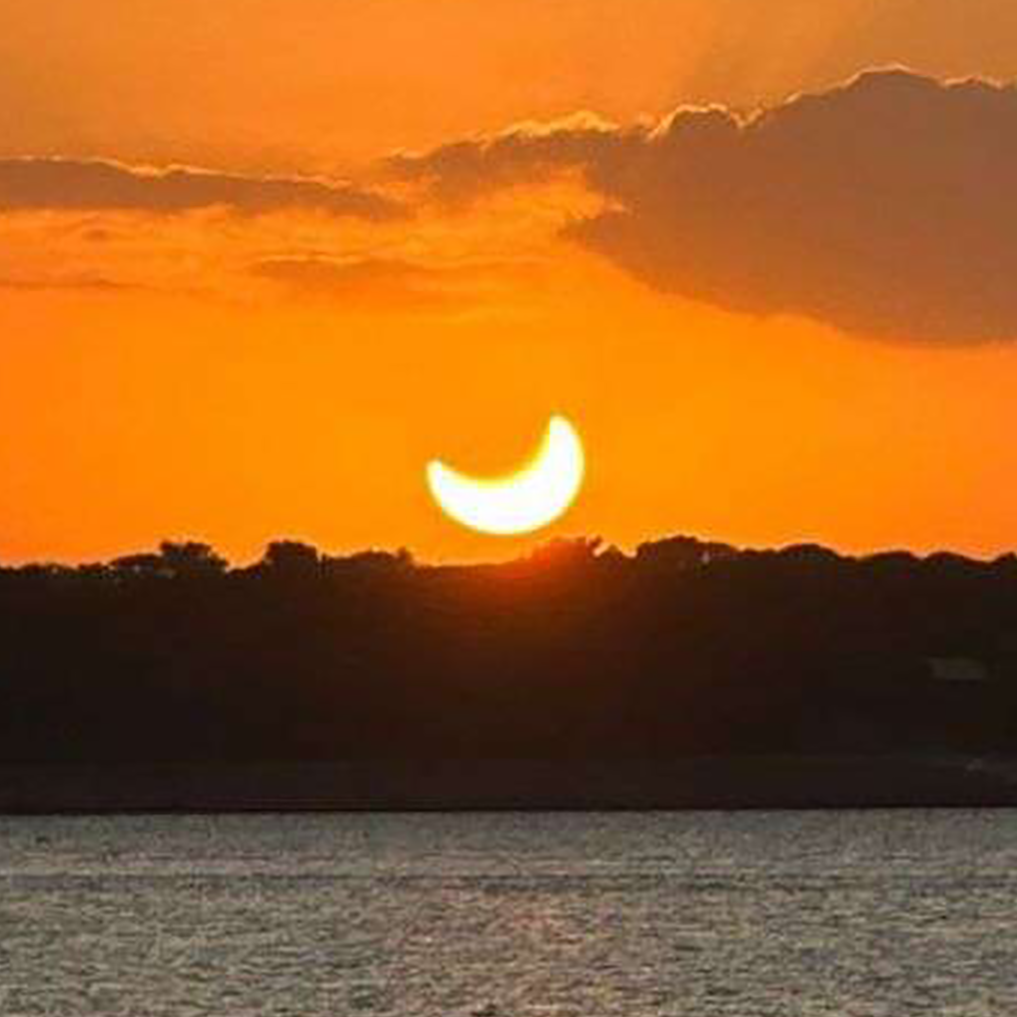
Natal, Brazil

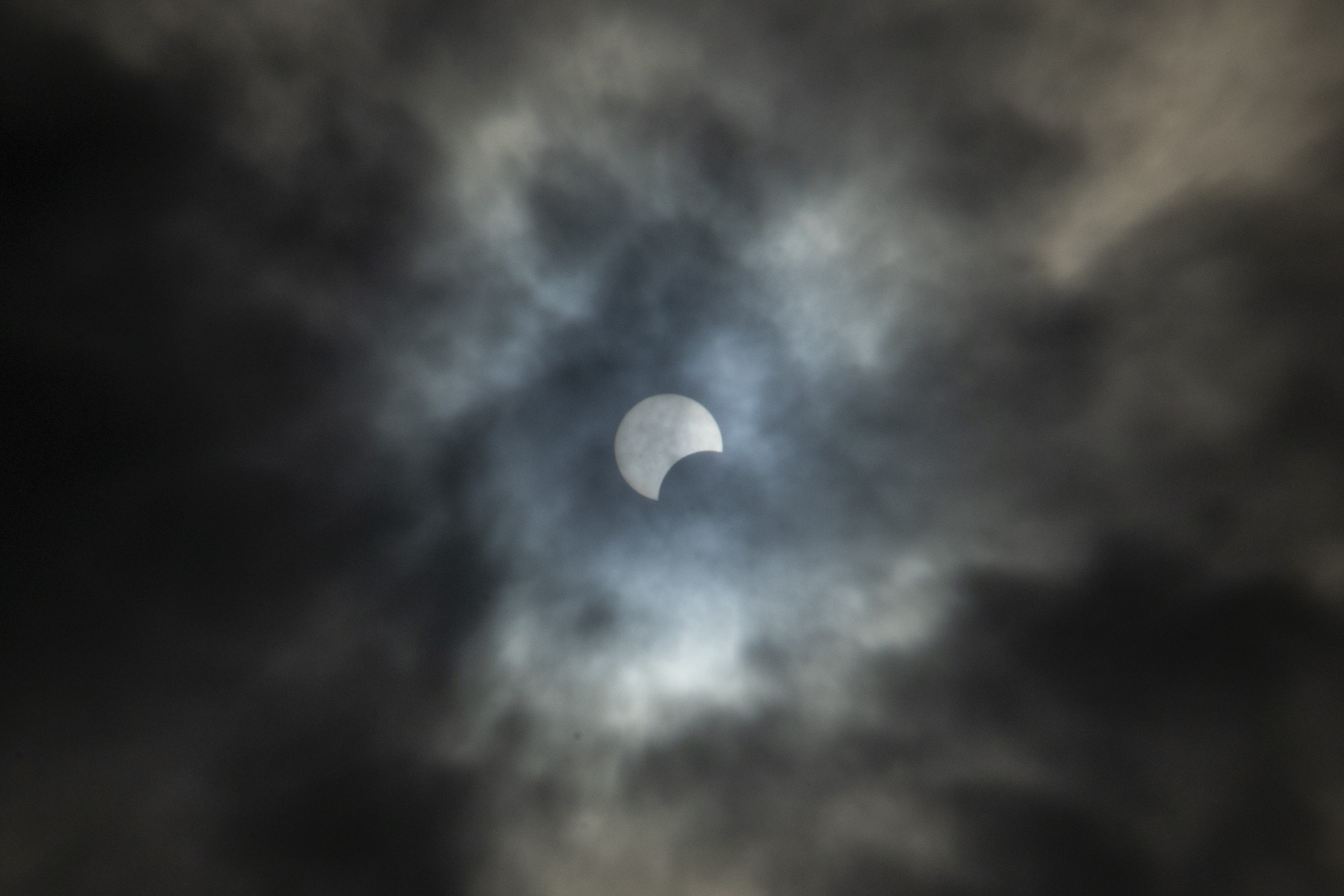
Belleville, Canada

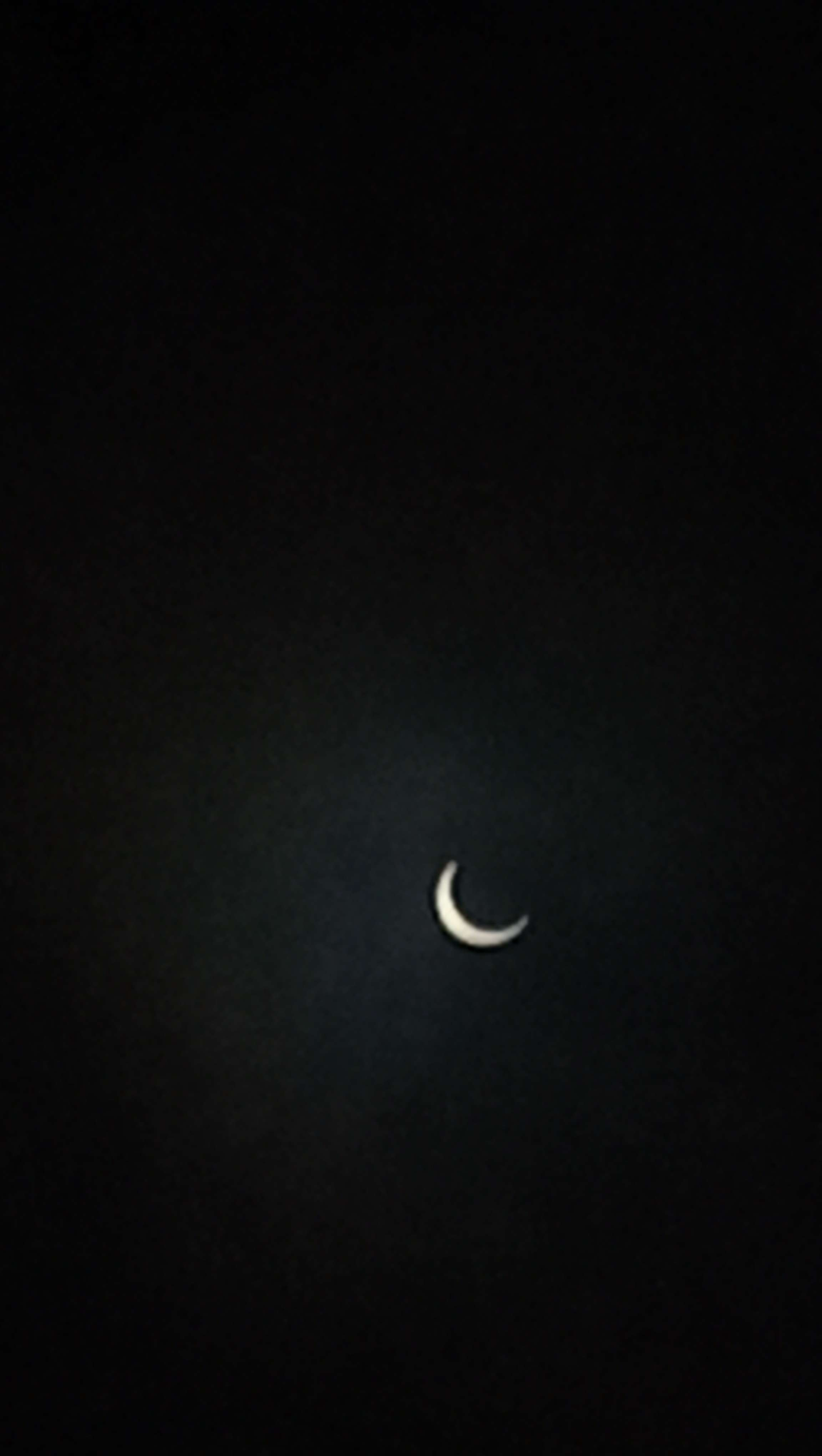
Rosa Zárate, Ecuador

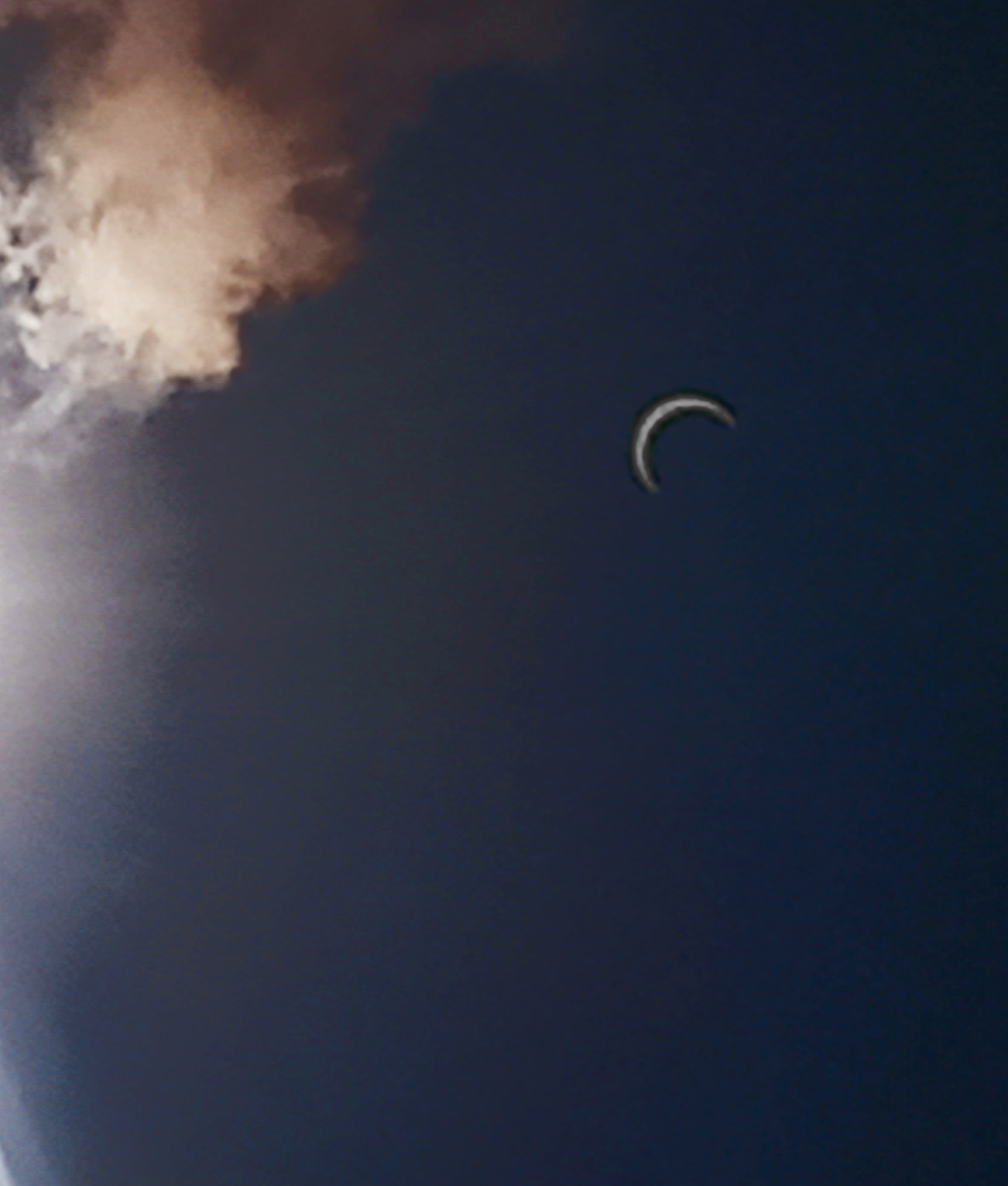
San Salvador, El Salvador

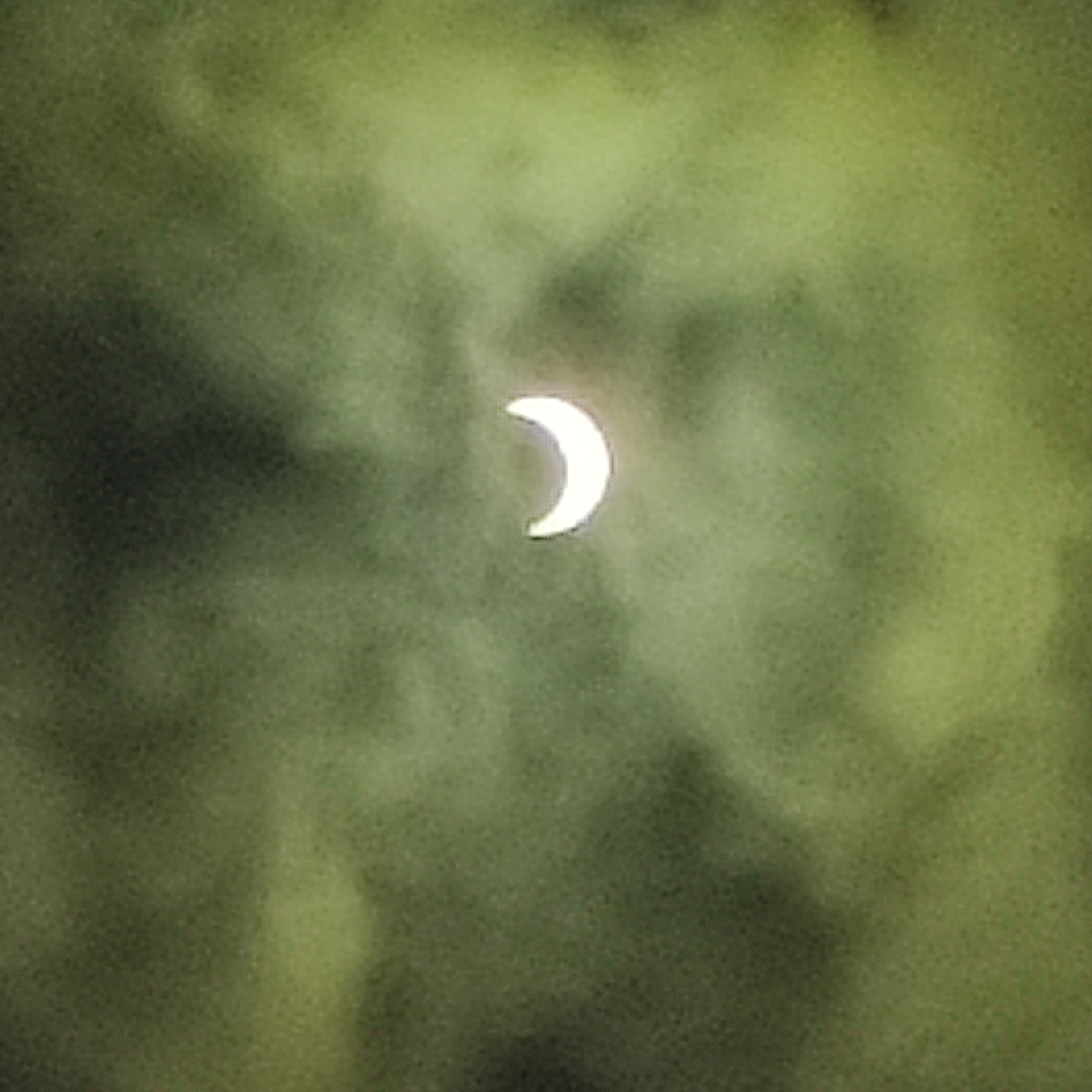
Querétaro City, Mexico

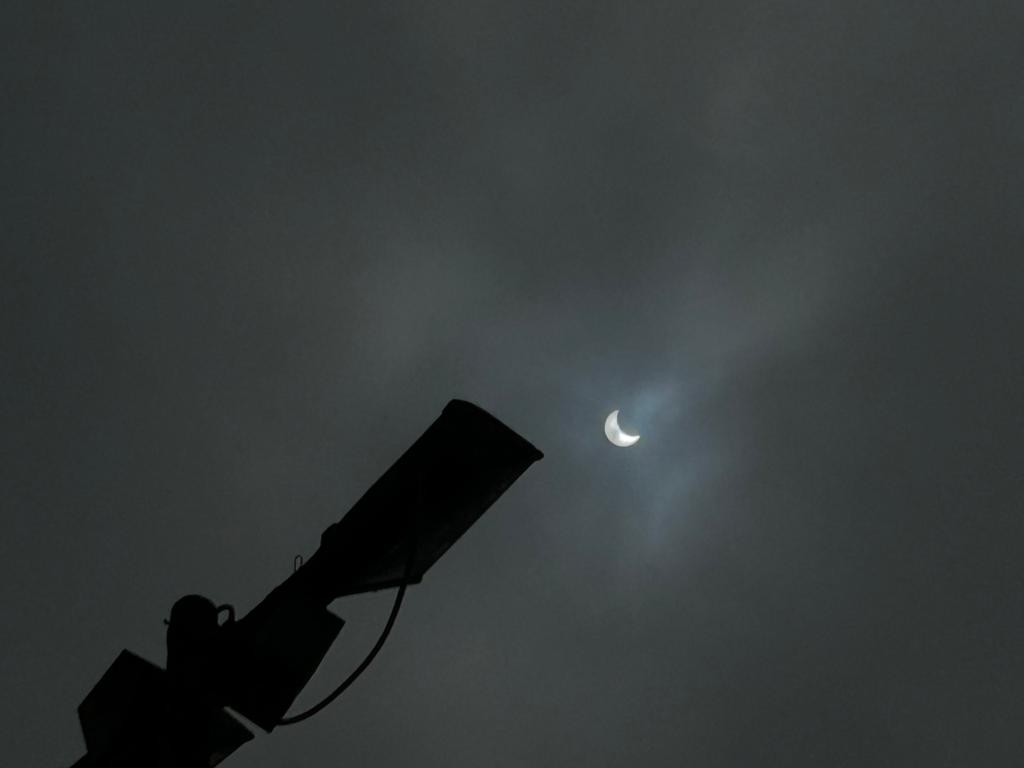
Lima, Peru

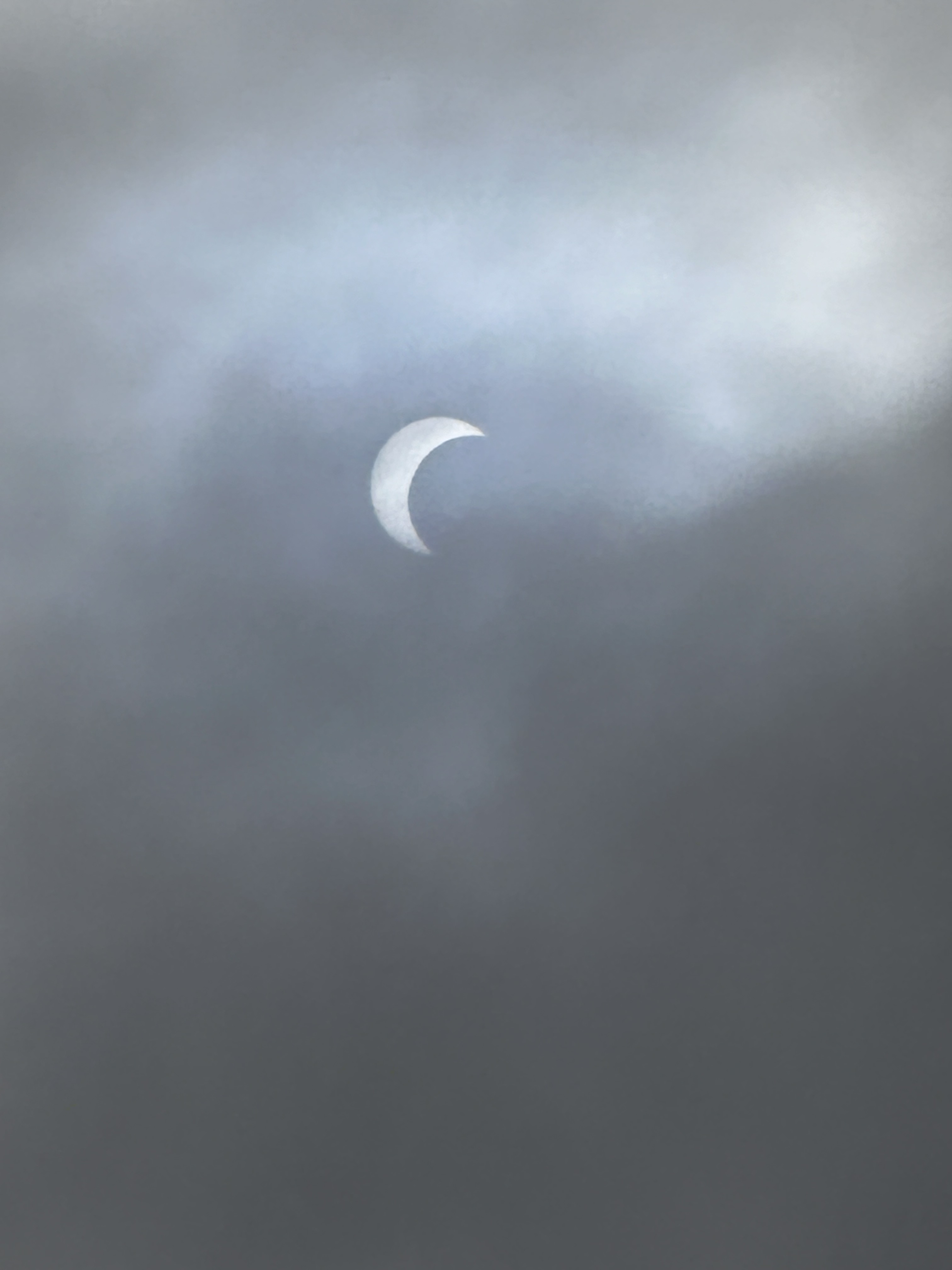
Izard County, Arkansas

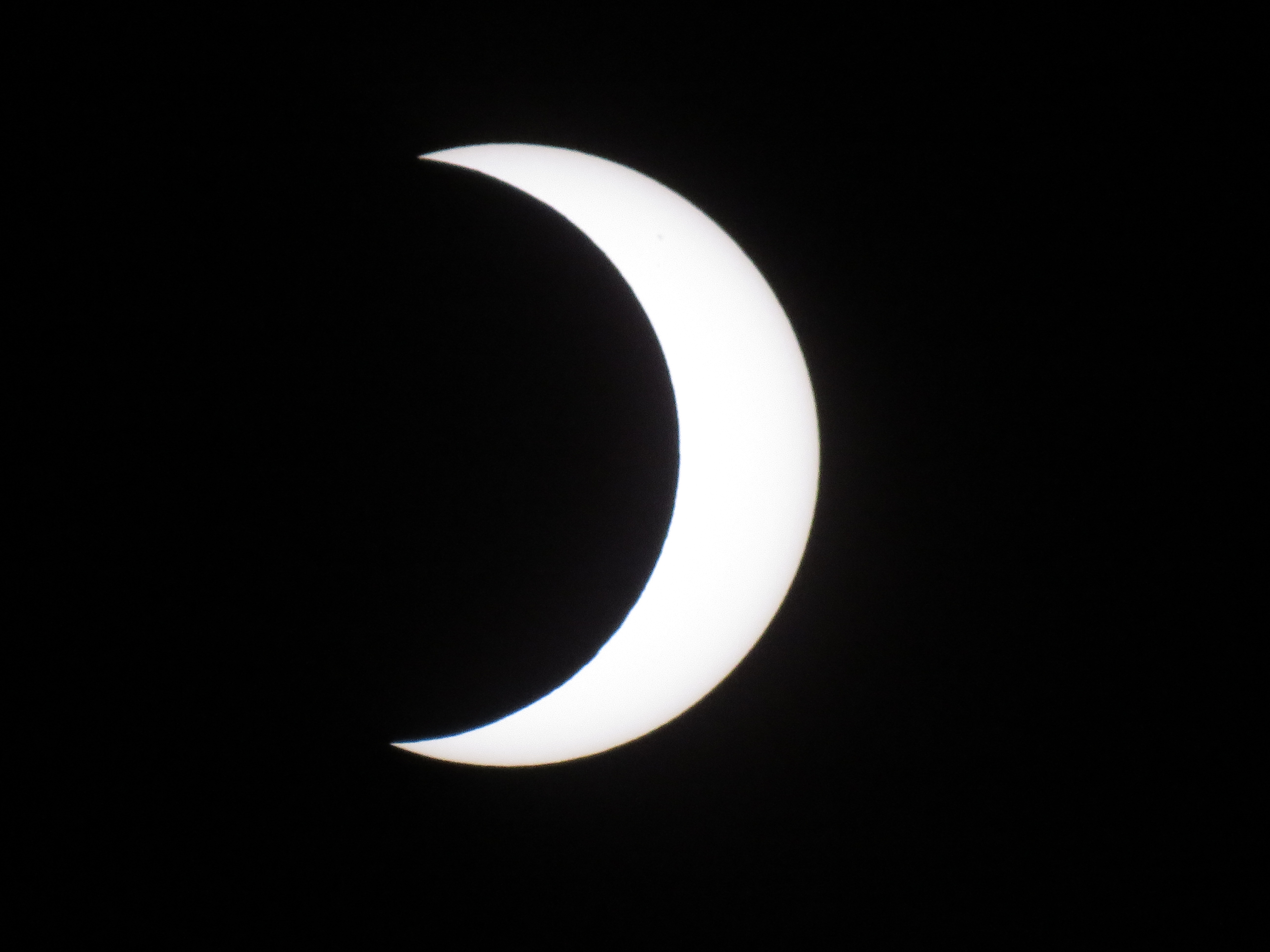
Santa Ana, California

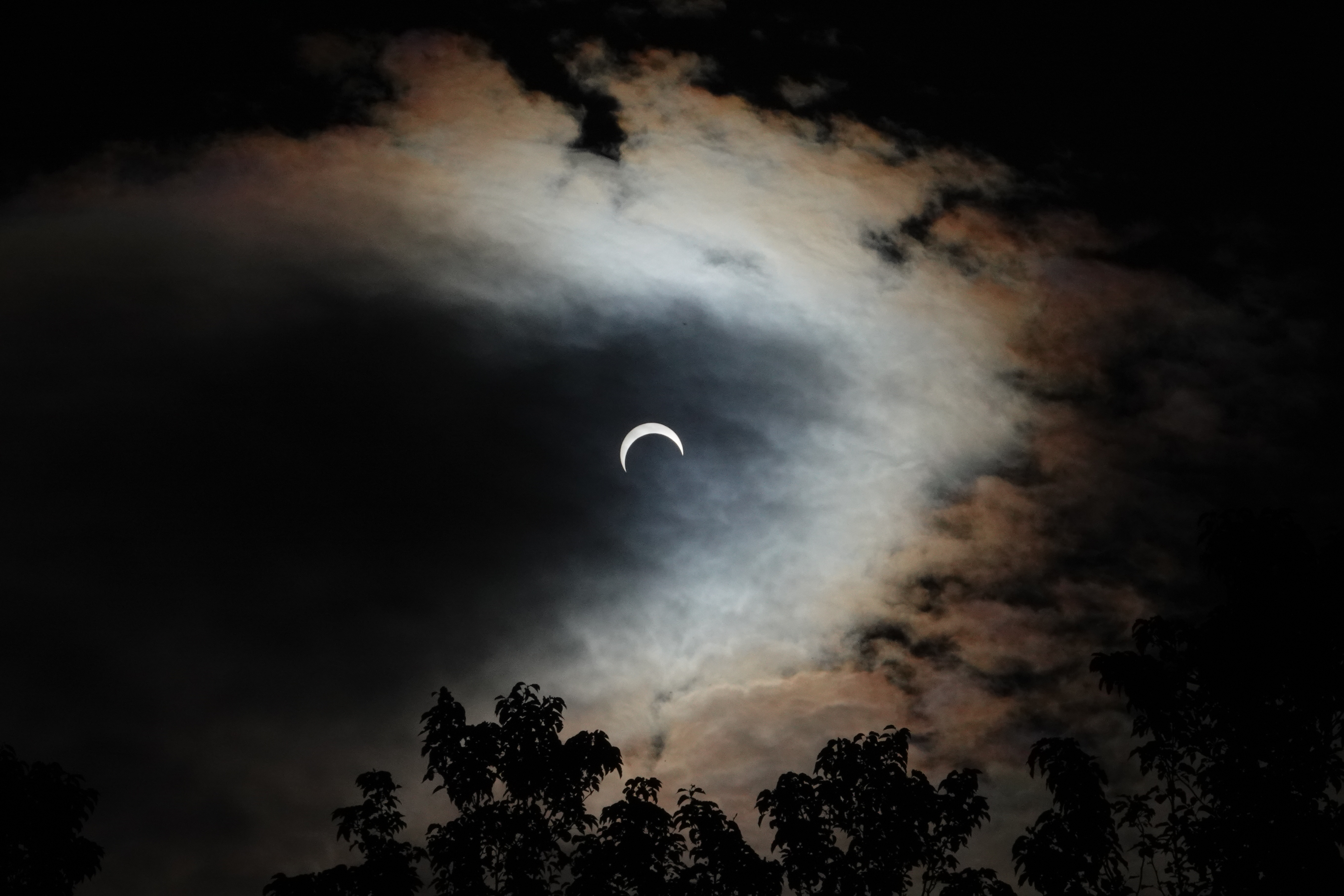
Boise, Idaho

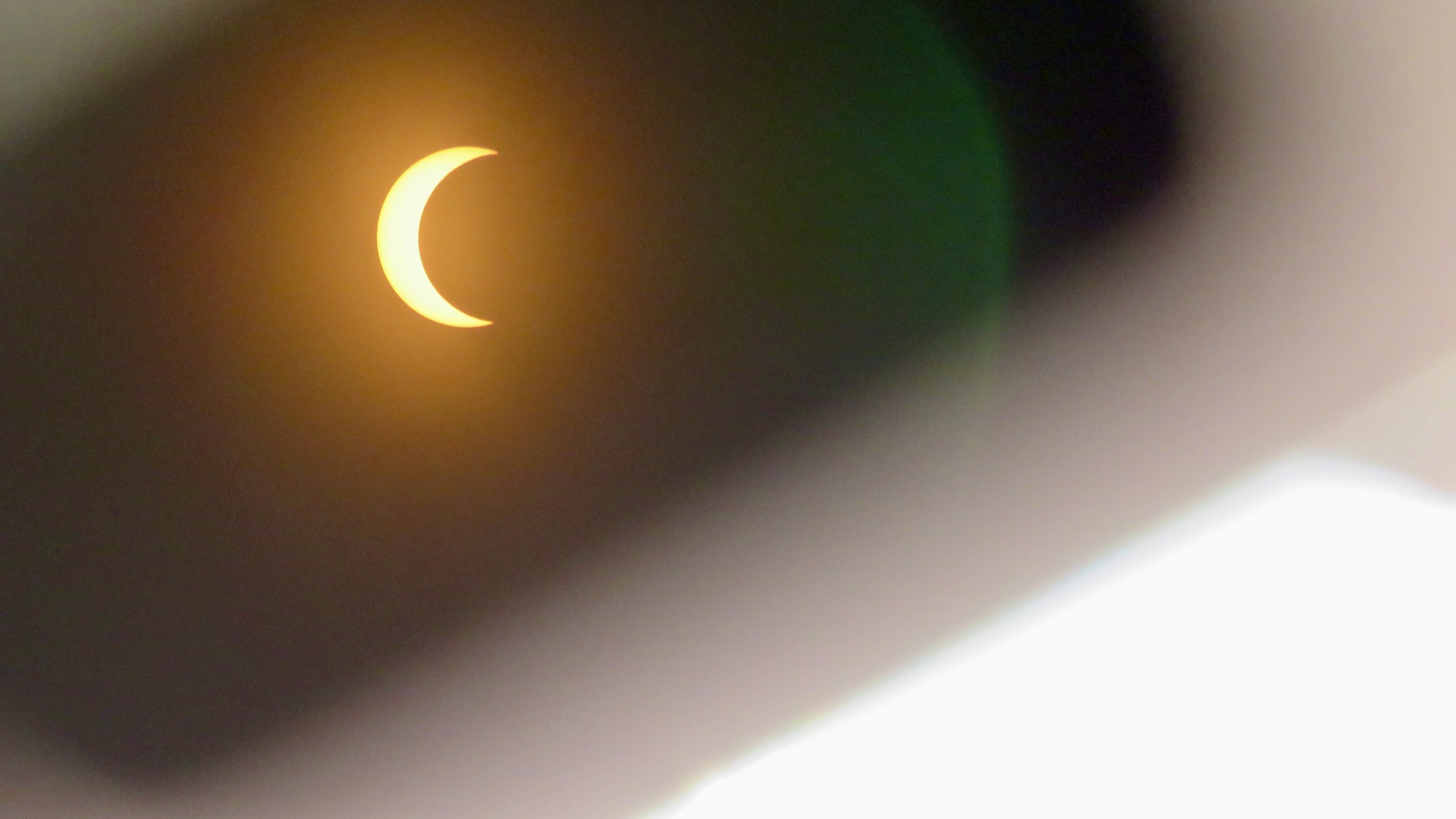
Bogalusa, Louisiana

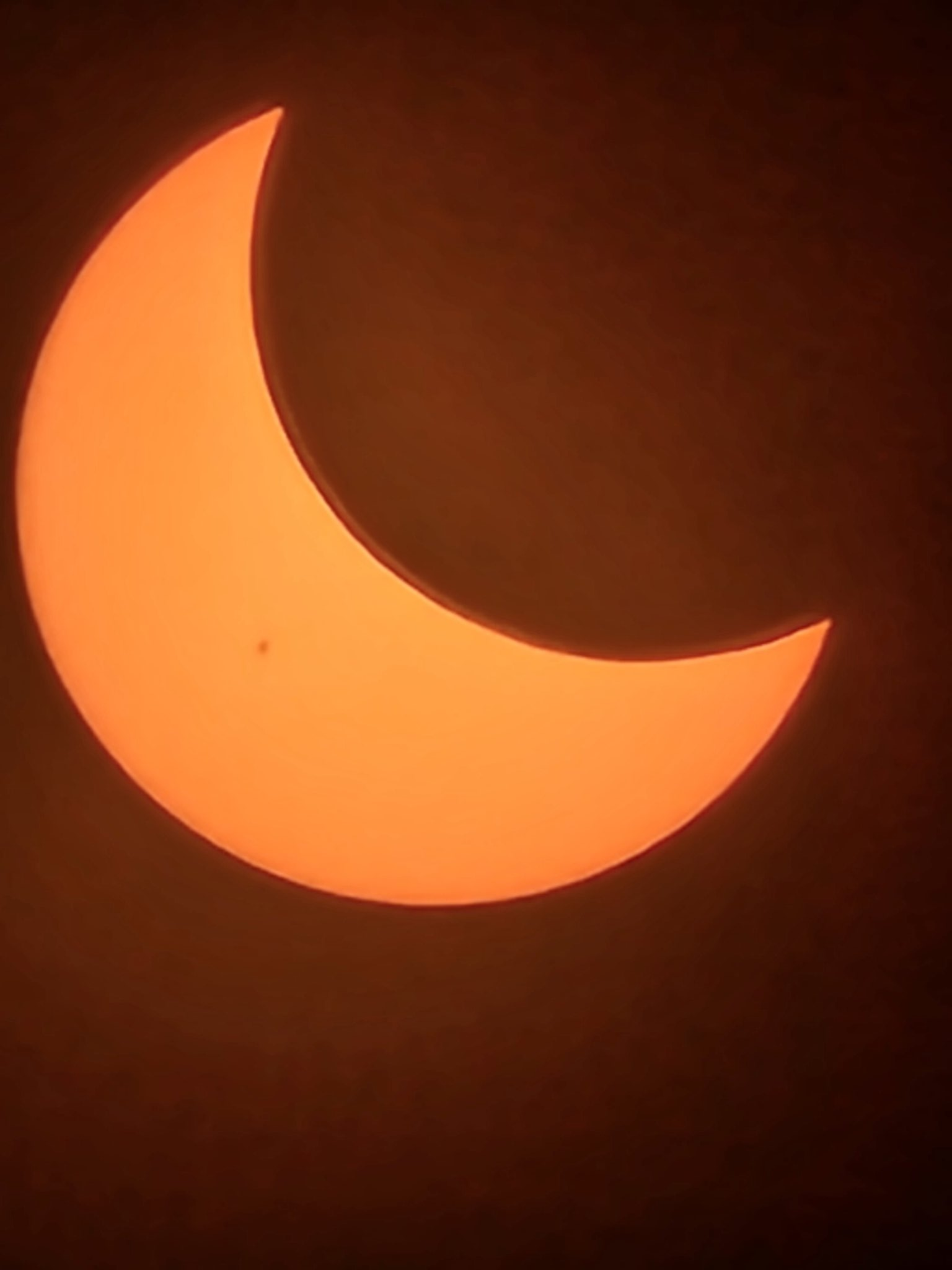
Norman, Oklahoma

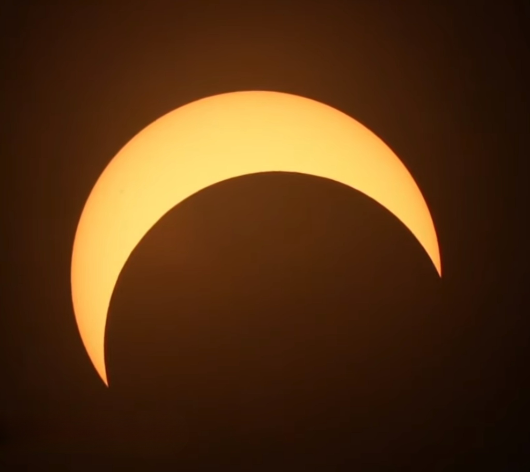
Kerrville, Texas

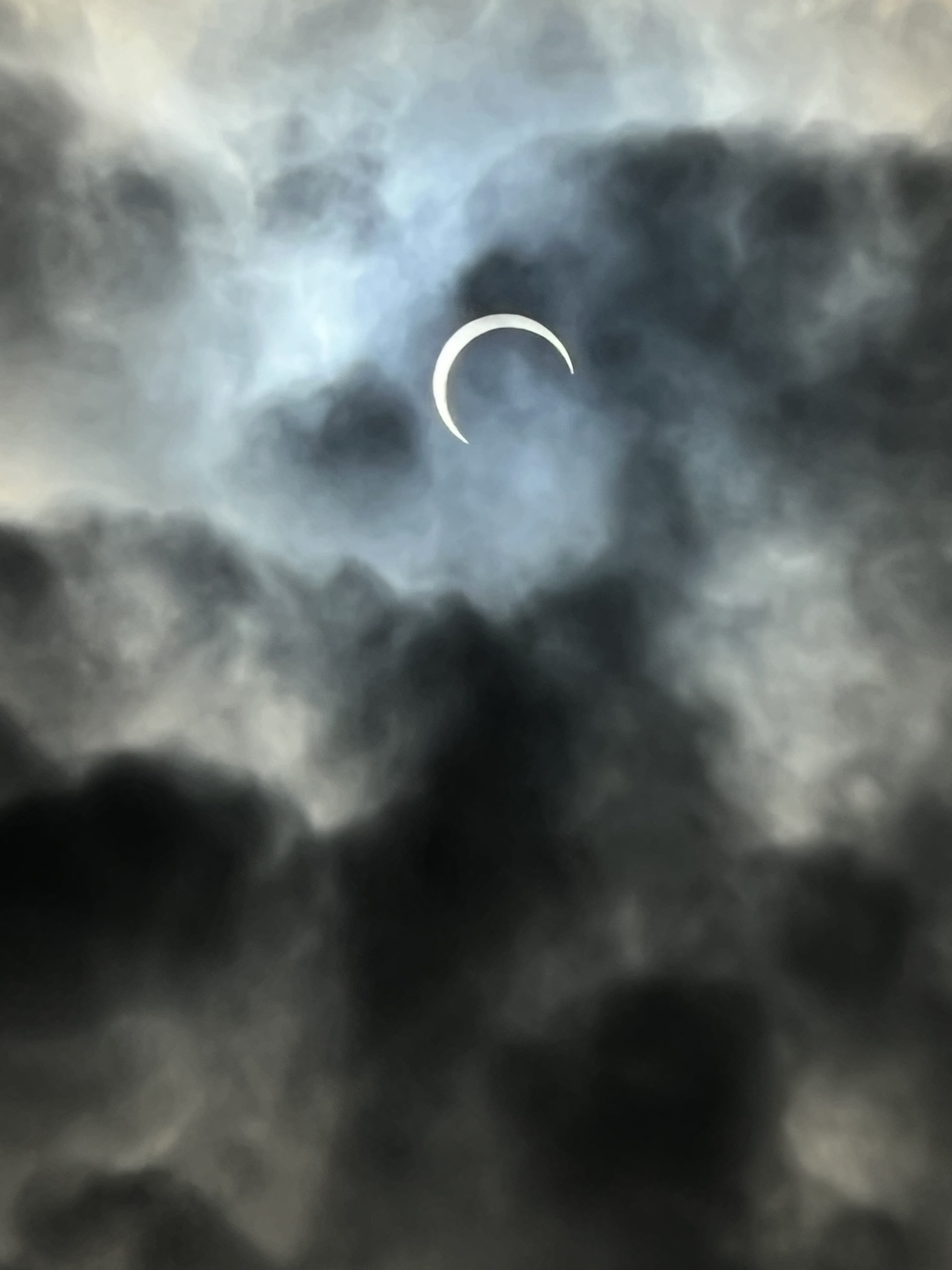
Salt Lake City, Utah

=== Sequences ===
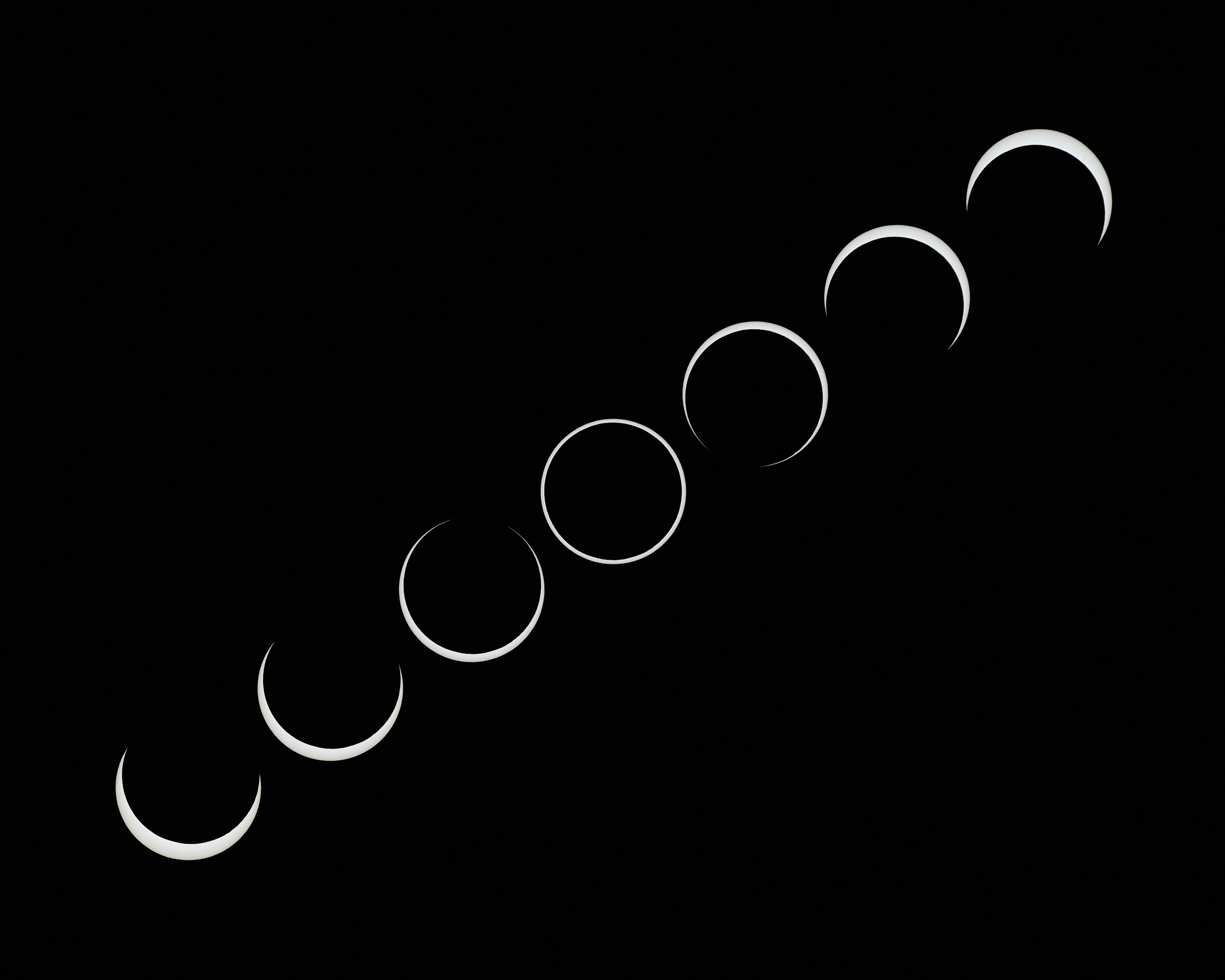
Albuquerque, New Mexico

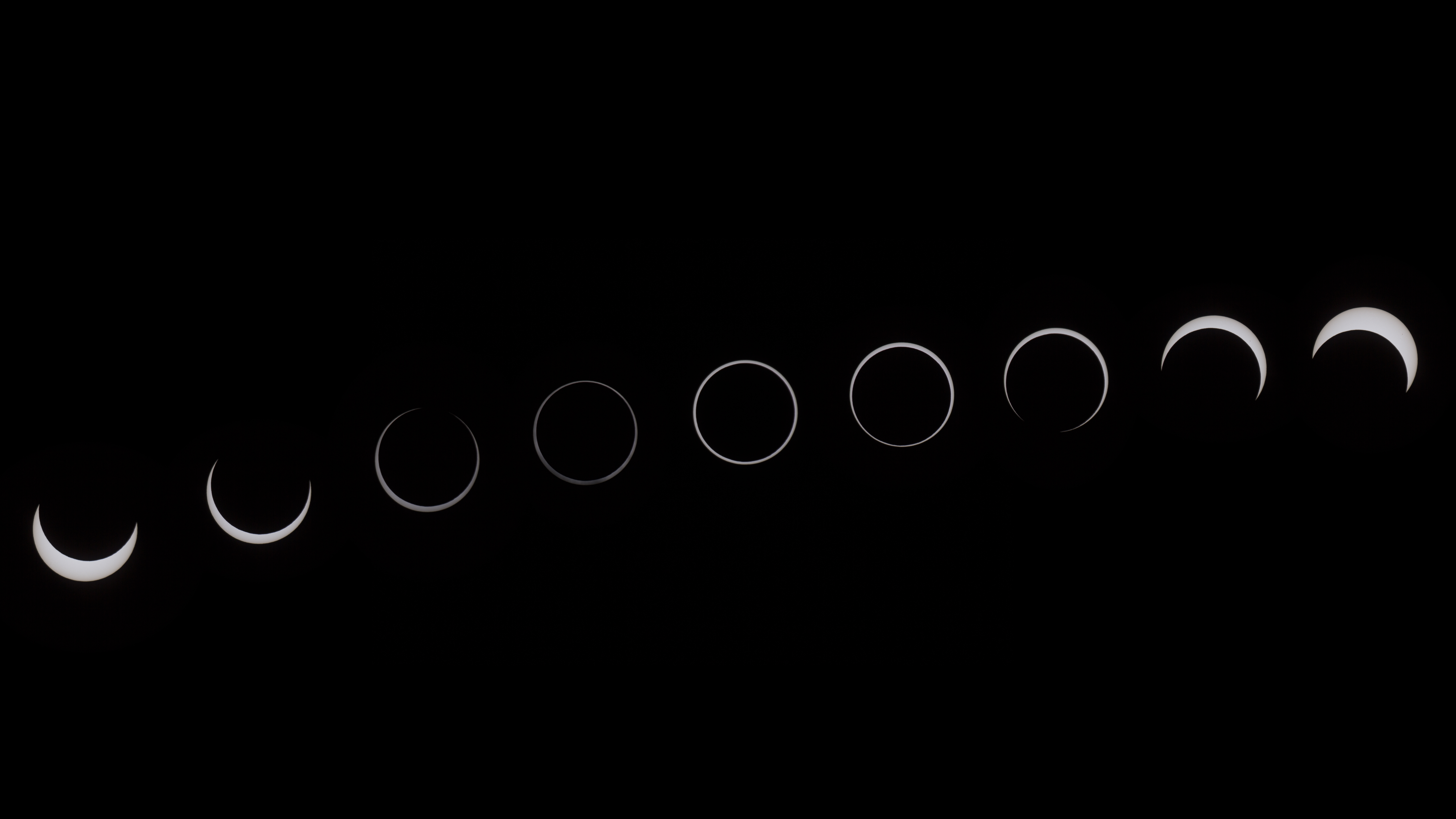
Hondo, Texas

=== Projections ===
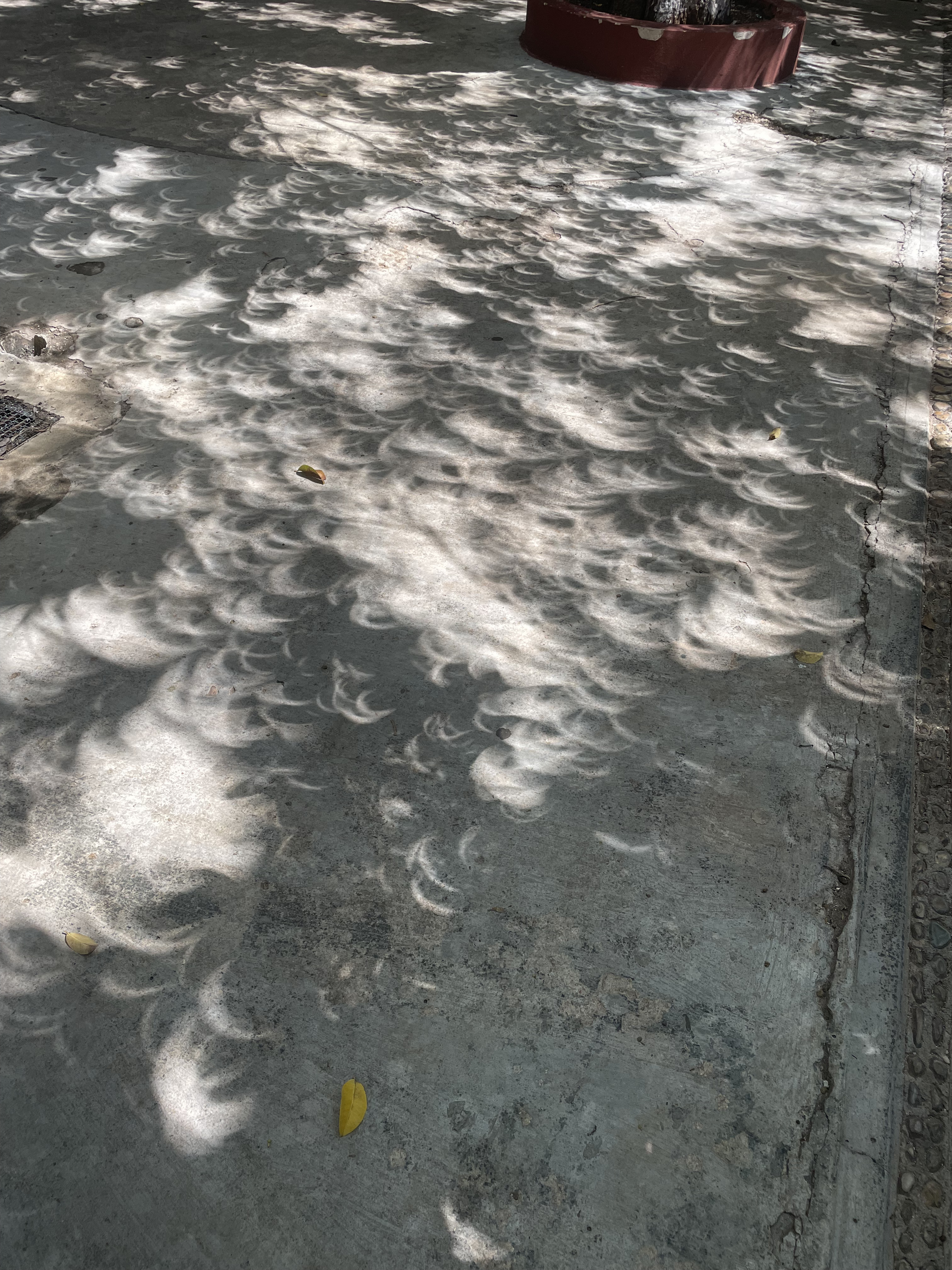
Mérida, Mexico

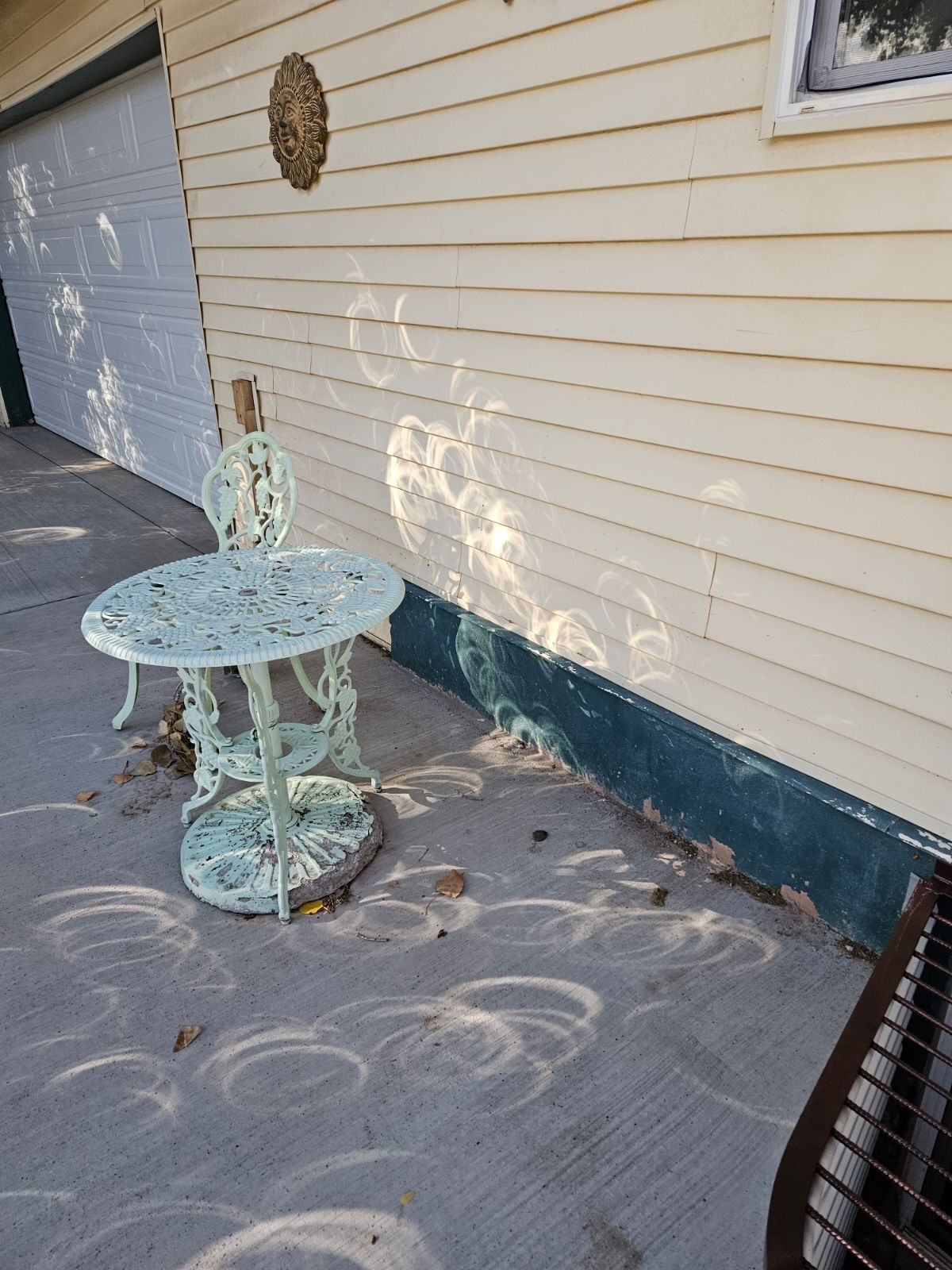
Salina, Utah

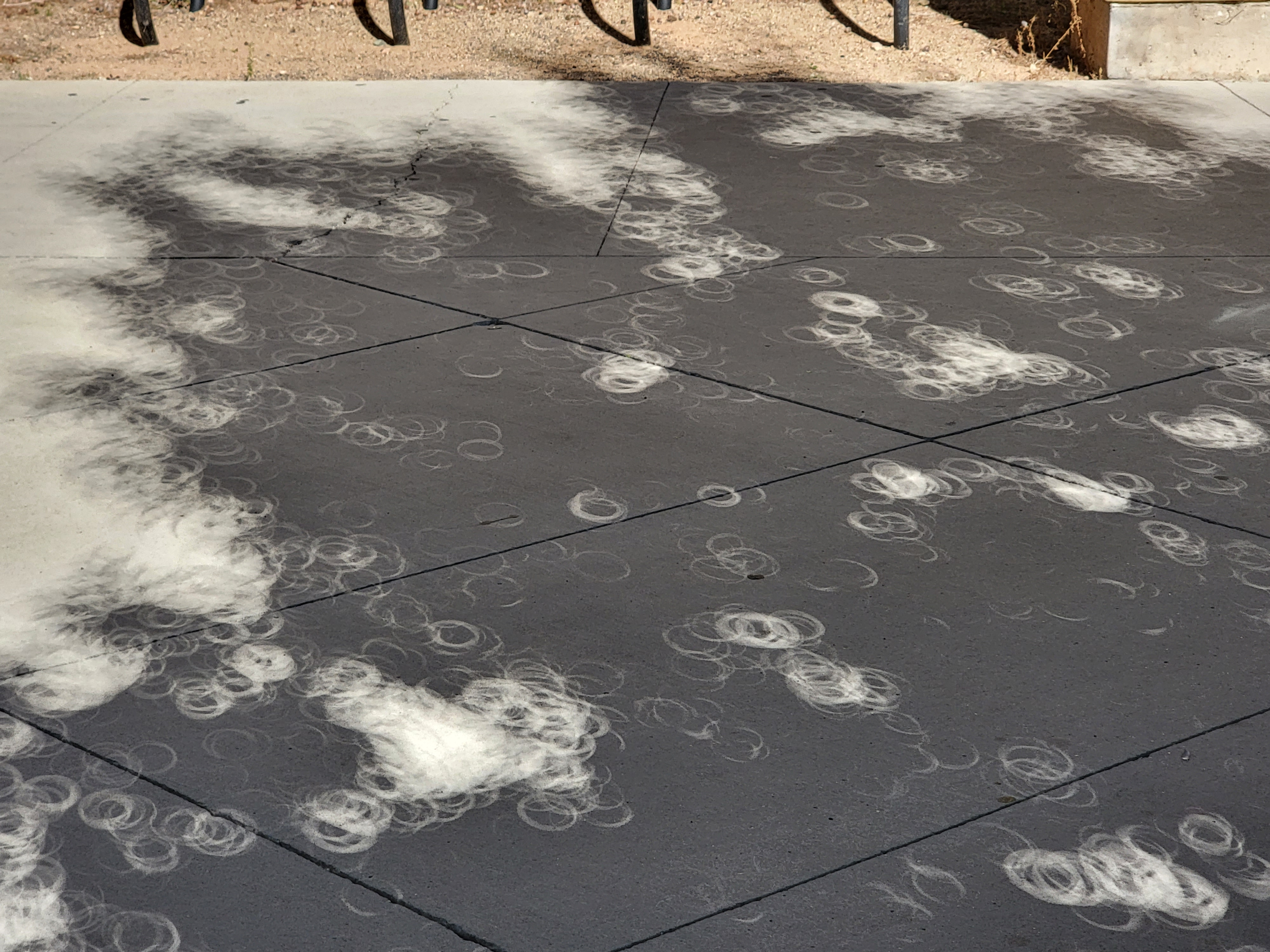
Albuquerque, New Mexico

== Citizen science ==
During the annular and total eclipses of 2023 and 2024, the GLOBE Program (Global Learning and Observations to Benefit the Environment), through the GLOBE Observer app, sought to collect information on air temperature, clouds, and wind. During the August 2017 eclipse, citizen scientists contributed with over 80,000 observations of air temperature and 20,000 cloud observations.

== Eclipse details ==
Shown below are two tables displaying details about this particular solar eclipse. The first table outlines times at which the Moon's penumbra or umbra attains the specific parameter, and the second table describes various other parameters pertaining to this eclipse.

October 14, 2023 Solar Eclipse Times
Event	Time (UTC)
First Penumbral External Contact	2023 October 14 at 15:04:58.2 UTC
First Umbral External Contact	2023 October 14 at 16:11:19.0 UTC
First Central Line	2023 October 14 at 16:13:35.5 UTC
First Umbral Internal Contact	2023 October 14 at 16:15:52.5 UTC
First Penumbral Internal Contact	2023 October 14 at 17:35:49.8 UTC
Equatorial Conjunction	2023 October 14 at 17:37:48.0 UTC
Ecliptic Conjunction	2023 October 14 at 17:56:18.3 UTC
Greatest Eclipse	2023 October 14 at 18:00:40.6 UTC
Greatest Duration	2023 October 14 at 18:14:20.8 UTC
Last Penumbral Internal Contact	2023 October 14 at 18:26:05.1 UTC
Last Umbral Internal Contact	2023 October 14 at 19:45:45.0 UTC
Last Central Line	2023 October 14 at 19:47:59.2 UTC
Last Umbral External Contact	2023 October 14 at 19:50:13.1 UTC
Last Penumbral External Contact	2023 October 14 at 20:56:26.7 UTC

October 14, 2023 Solar Eclipse Parameters
Parameter	Value
Eclipse Magnitude	0.95204
Eclipse Obscuration	0.90638
Gamma	0.37534
Sun Right Ascension	13h18m05.4s
Sun Declination	-08°14'36.7"
Sun Semi-Diameter	16'02.0"
Sun Equatorial Horizontal Parallax	08.8"
Moon Right Ascension	13h18m44.3s
Moon Declination	-07°56'18.9"
Moon Semi-Diameter	15'02.9"
Moon Equatorial Horizontal Parallax	0°55'13.8"
ΔT	71.3 s

== Eclipse season ==
This eclipse is part of an eclipse season, a period, roughly every six months, when eclipses occur. Only two (or occasionally three) eclipse seasons occur each year, and each season lasts about 35 days and repeats just short of six months (173 days) later; thus two full eclipse seasons always occur each year. Either two or three eclipses happen each eclipse season. In the sequence below, each eclipse is separated by a fortnight.

Eclipse season of October 2023
October 14 Descending node (new moon)	October 28 Ascending node (full moon)
Annular solar eclipse Solar Saros 134	Partial lunar eclipse Lunar Saros 146

== Related eclipses ==
=== Eclipses in 2023 ===
- A hybrid solar eclipse on April 20.
- A penumbral lunar eclipse on May 5.
- An annular solar eclipse on October 14.
- A partial lunar eclipse on October 28.

=== Metonic ===
- Preceded by: Solar eclipse of December 26, 2019
- Followed by: Solar eclipse of August 2, 2027

=== Tzolkinex ===
- Preceded by: Solar eclipse of September 1, 2016
- Followed by: Solar eclipse of November 25, 2030

=== Half-Saros ===
- Preceded by: Lunar eclipse of October 8, 2014
- Followed by: Lunar eclipse of October 18, 2032

=== Tritos ===
- Preceded by: Solar eclipse of November 13, 2012
- Followed by: Solar eclipse of September 12, 2034

=== Solar Saros 134 ===
- Preceded by: Solar eclipse of October 3, 2005
- Followed by: Solar eclipse of October 25, 2041

=== Inex ===
- Preceded by: Solar eclipse of November 3, 1994
- Followed by: Solar eclipse of September 22, 2052

=== Triad ===
- Preceded by: Solar eclipse of December 13, 1936
- Followed by: Solar eclipse of August 15, 2110

=== Solar eclipses of 2022–2025 ===
Solar eclipse series sets from 2022 to 2025
Ascending node			Descending node		
Saros	Map	Gamma	Saros	Map	Gamma
119 Partial in CTIO, Chile	April 30, 2022 Partial	−1.19008	124 Partial from Saratov, Russia	October 25, 2022 Partial	1.07014
129 Totality from Exmouth, WA	April 20, 2023 Hybrid	−0.39515	134 Mexican Hat, UT	October 14, 2023 Annular	0.37534
139 Totality in Dallas, TX	April 8, 2024 Total	0.34314	144 Tres Cerros, Argentina	October 2, 2024 Annular	−0.35087
149 Partial from Halifax, NS	March 29, 2025 Partial	1.04053	154	September 21, 2025 Partial	−1.06509

=== Saros 134 ===
This eclipse is a part of Saros series 134, repeating every 18 years, 11 days, and containing 71 events. The series started with a partial solar eclipse on June 22, 1248. It contains total eclipses from October 9, 1428 through December 24, 1554; hybrid eclipses from January 3, 1573 through June 27, 1843; and annular eclipses from July 8, 1861 through May 21, 2384. The series ends at member 72 as a partial eclipse on August 6, 2510. Its eclipses are tabulated in three columns; every third eclipse in the same column is one exeligmos apart, so they all cast shadows over approximately the same parts of the Earth.

The longest duration of totality was produced by member 11 at 1 minutes, 30 seconds on October 9, 1428, and the longest duration of annularity will be produced by member 52 at 10 minutes, 55 seconds on January 10, 2168. All eclipses in this series occur at the Moon’s descending node of orbit.

Series members 32–53 occur between 1801 and 2200:
32	33	34
June 6, 1807	June 16, 1825	June 27, 1843
35	36	37
July 8, 1861	July 19, 1879	July 29, 1897
38	39	40
August 10, 1915	August 21, 1933	September 1, 1951
41	42	43
September 11, 1969	September 23, 1987	October 3, 2005
44	45	46
October 14, 2023	October 25, 2041	November 5, 2059
47	48	49
November 15, 2077	November 27, 2095	December 8, 2113
50	51	52
December 19, 2131	December 30, 2149	January 10, 2168
53
January 20, 2186

=== Metonic series ===
The metonic series repeats eclipses every 19 years (6939.69 days), lasting about 5 cycles. Eclipses occur in nearly the same calendar date. In addition, the octon subseries repeats 1/5 of that or every 3.8 years (1387.94 days). All eclipses in this table occur at the Moon's descending node.

21 eclipse events between May 21, 1993 and May 20, 2069
May 20–21	March 9	December 25–26	October 13–14	August 1–2
118	120	122	124	126
May 21, 1993	March 9, 1997	December 25, 2000	October 14, 2004	August 1, 2008
128	130	132	134	136
May 20, 2012	March 9, 2016	December 26, 2019	October 14, 2023	August 2, 2027
138	140	142	144	146
May 21, 2031	March 9, 2035	December 26, 2038	October 14, 2042	August 2, 2046
148	150	152	154	156
May 20, 2050	March 9, 2054	December 26, 2057	October 13, 2061	August 2, 2065
158
May 20, 2069

=== Tritos series ===
This eclipse is a part of a tritos cycle, repeating at alternating nodes every 135 synodic months (≈ 3986.63 days, or 11 years minus 1 month). Their appearance and longitude are irregular due to a lack of synchronization with the anomalistic month (period of perigee), but groupings of 3 tritos cycles (≈ 33 years minus 3 months) come close (≈ 434.044 anomalistic months), so eclipses are similar in these groupings.

Series members between 1801 and 2200
June 26, 1805 (Saros 114)	May 27, 1816 (Saros 115)	April 26, 1827 (Saros 116)	March 25, 1838 (Saros 117)	February 23, 1849 (Saros 118)
January 23, 1860 (Saros 119)	December 22, 1870 (Saros 120)	November 21, 1881 (Saros 121)	October 20, 1892 (Saros 122)	September 21, 1903 (Saros 123)
August 21, 1914 (Saros 124)	July 20, 1925 (Saros 125)	June 19, 1936 (Saros 126)	May 20, 1947 (Saros 127)	April 19, 1958 (Saros 128)
March 18, 1969 (Saros 129)	February 16, 1980 (Saros 130)	January 15, 1991 (Saros 131)	December 14, 2001 (Saros 132)	November 13, 2012 (Saros 133)
October 14, 2023 (Saros 134)	September 12, 2034 (Saros 135)	August 12, 2045 (Saros 136)	July 12, 2056 (Saros 137)	June 11, 2067 (Saros 138)
May 11, 2078 (Saros 139)	April 10, 2089 (Saros 140)	March 10, 2100 (Saros 141)	February 8, 2111 (Saros 142)	January 8, 2122 (Saros 143)
December 7, 2132 (Saros 144)	November 7, 2143 (Saros 145)	October 7, 2154 (Saros 146)	September 5, 2165 (Saros 147)	August 4, 2176 (Saros 148)
July 6, 2187 (Saros 149)	June 4, 2198 (Saros 150)			

=== Inex series ===
This eclipse is a part of the long period inex cycle, repeating at alternating nodes, every 358 synodic months (≈ 10,571.95 days, or 29 years minus 20 days). Their appearance and longitude are irregular due to a lack of synchronization with the anomalistic month (period of perigee). However, groupings of 3 inex cycles (≈ 87 years minus 2 months) comes close (≈ 1,151.02 anomalistic months), so eclipses are similar in these groupings.

Series members between 1801 and 2200
March 4, 1821 (Saros 127)	February 12, 1850 (Saros 128)	January 22, 1879 (Saros 129)
January 3, 1908 (Saros 130)	December 13, 1936 (Saros 131)	November 23, 1965 (Saros 132)
November 3, 1994 (Saros 133)	October 14, 2023 (Saros 134)	September 22, 2052 (Saros 135)
September 3, 2081 (Saros 136)	August 15, 2110 (Saros 137)	July 25, 2139 (Saros 138)
July 5, 2168 (Saros 139)	June 15, 2197 (Saros 140)	

== See also ==
- List of solar eclipses in the 21st century
