= Oxkutzcab Municipality =

Municipality in the Mexican state of Yucatán

Oxkutzcab
- Municipality
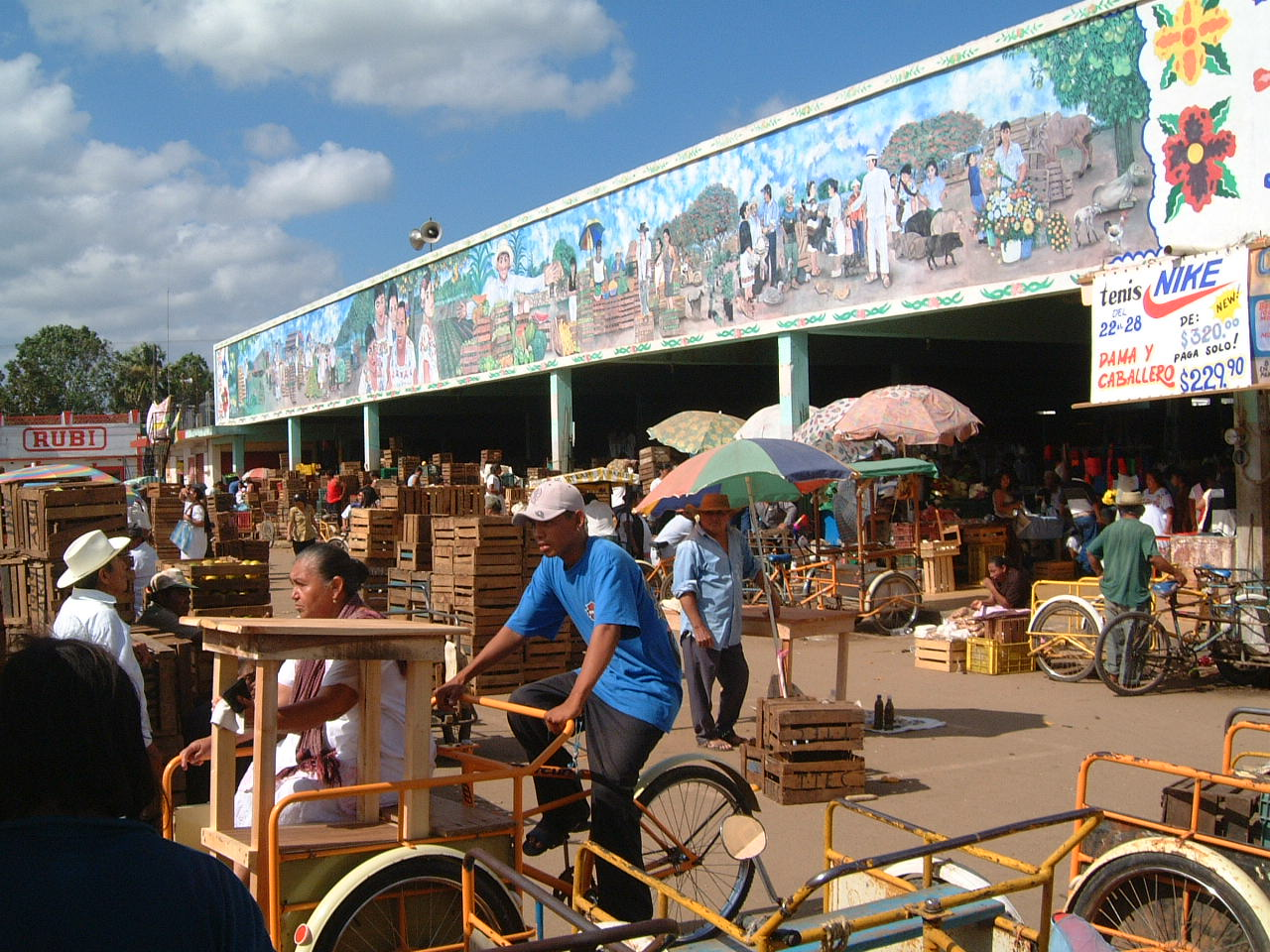
- "20 de noviembre" Market in Oxkutzcab

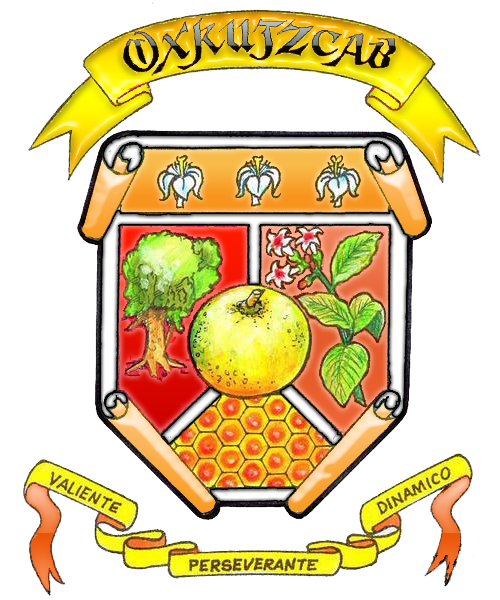
- Coat of arms

- Location of Oxkutzcab in Yucatán

- Location of Oxkutzcab in Mexico
- Coordinates: 20°18′N 89°25′W
- Country: Mexico
- State: Yucatán

Government
  - Municipal President: José Gualberto Ayora Cámara

Area
  - Total: 512.23 km^{2} (197.77 sq mi)

Population (2005)
  - Total: 27,084
  - Density: 52.875/km^{2} (136.94/sq mi)
- Time zone: UTC-6 (Central Standard Time)
- INEGI Code: 056
- Major Airport: Merida (Manuel Crescencio Rejón) International Airport
- IATA Code: MID
- ICAO Code: MMMD

Oxkutzcab Municipality is a municipality, with a municipal seat of the same name in the Mexican state of Yucatán, southeast of Maní, Yucatán, located at . The name in the Yucatec Maya language means "Place of ramon, tobacco, and honey".

According to the 2005 census, Oxkutzcab had a population of 21,341 people in the city and 27,084 in the entire municipality, predominantly of Maya descent. Henequen, sugar, tobacco, maize, and fruit are grown commercially in the surrounding area. The municipality has an area of 512.23 km^{2} (197.77 sq mi) and includes a number of smaller towns, the largest of which are Yaxhachén, Xohuayán, Emiliano Zapata, and Xul. Loltun Cave is 5 km (3.1 mi) south of the city.

== Geography ==
=== Climate ===
Climate data for Oxcutzcab
Month	Jan	Feb	Mar	Apr	May	Jun	Jul	Aug	Sep	Oct	Nov	Dec	Year
Mean daily maximum °C (°F)	29.6 (85.3)	31.3 (88.3)	33.5 (92.3)	35.5 (95.9)	37.0 (98.6)	35.5 (95.9)	34.9 (94.8)	34.8 (94.6)	34.2 (93.6)	32.3 (90.1)	30.9 (87.6)	29.6 (85.3)	33.3 (91.9)
Mean daily minimum °C (°F)	14.8 (58.6)	15.4 (59.7)	16.8 (62.2)	19 (66)	20.9 (69.6)	21.6 (70.9)	21.0 (69.8)	21.2 (70.2)	21.3 (70.3)	20 (68)	18 (64)	16.0 (60.8)	18.8 (65.8)
Average precipitation mm (inches)	28 (1.1)	20 (0.8)	38 (1.5)	46 (1.8)	86 (3.4)	150 (6.1)	150 (6.1)	190 (7.5)	200 (7.7)	110 (4.2)	51 (2)	51 (2)	1,130 (44.3)
Source: Weatherbase
