= Oxkutzcab =

- Municipal Seat
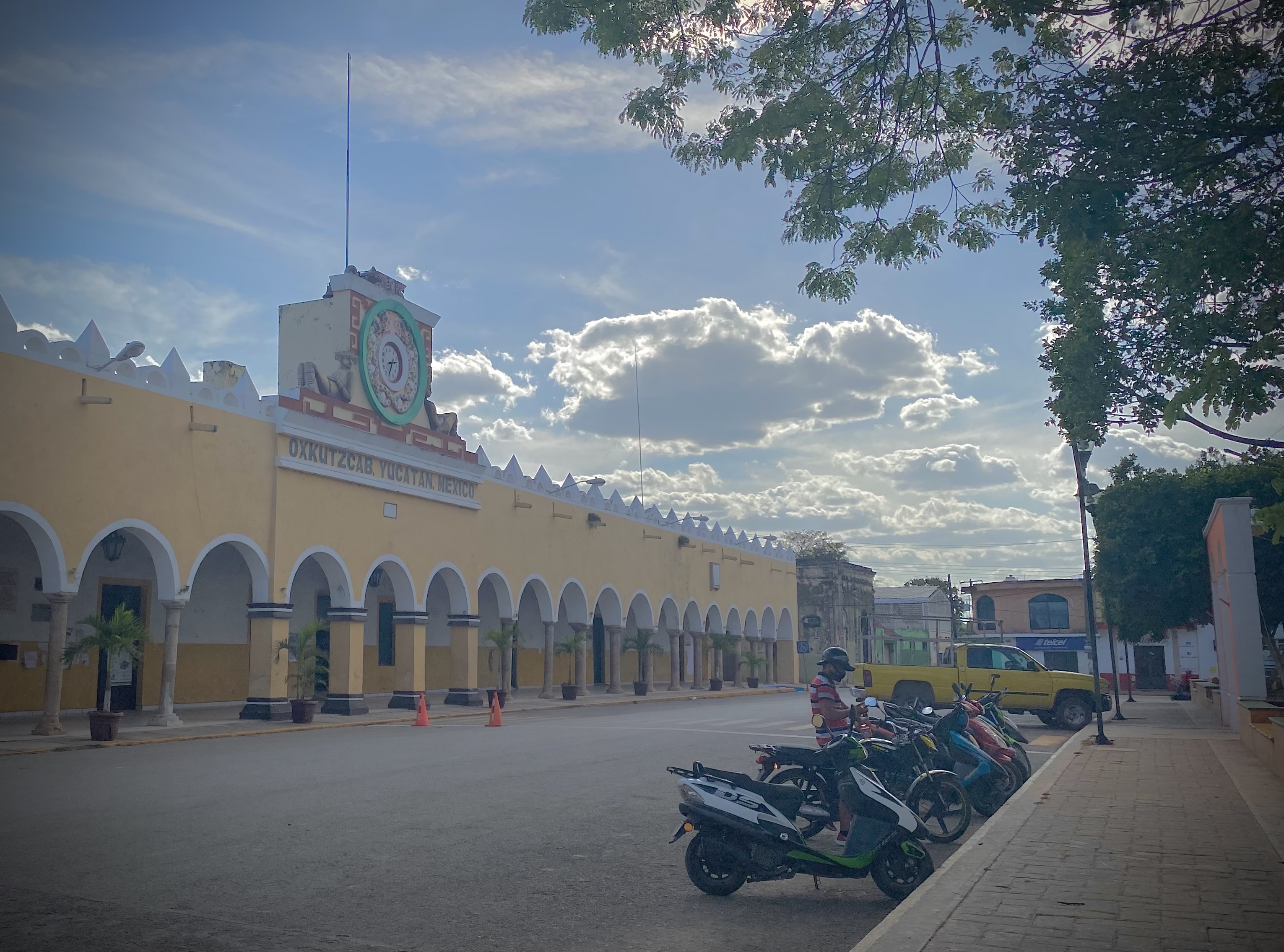
- City hall in April 2021

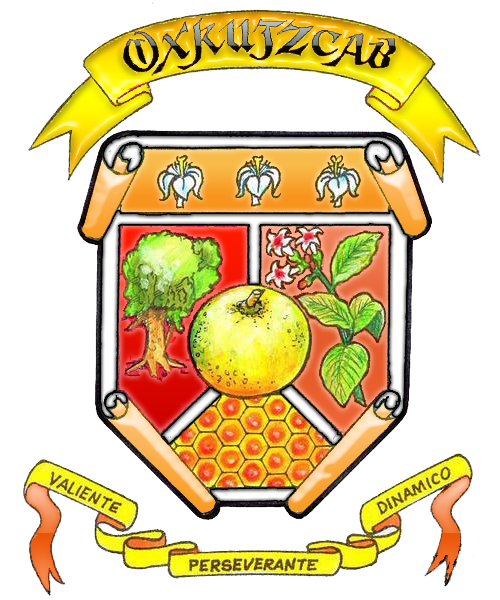
- Coat of arms

- Location within Yucatán (state)
- Coordinates: 20°18′20″N 89°25′06″W
- Country: Mexico
- State: Yucatán
- Municipality: Oxkutzcab
- Elevation: 23 m (75 ft)

Population (2015)
  - Total: 21,508
- Time zone: UTC-6 (Central Standard Time)
- Postal code: 97880
- Area code: 997
- Demonym: Oxkutzcabense

Oxkutzcab (Mayan pronunciation: [oʃkʼutsˈkab]) is a small city and the municipal seat of the Oxkutzcab Municipality, Yucatán in Mexico. As of 2015, the city has a population of 33,854. Oxkutzcab is an agricultural center, focused mainly on the production of tropical fruits such as citrus, sapote, avocado, mango, papaya, mamey, huaya, saramuyo and plums.

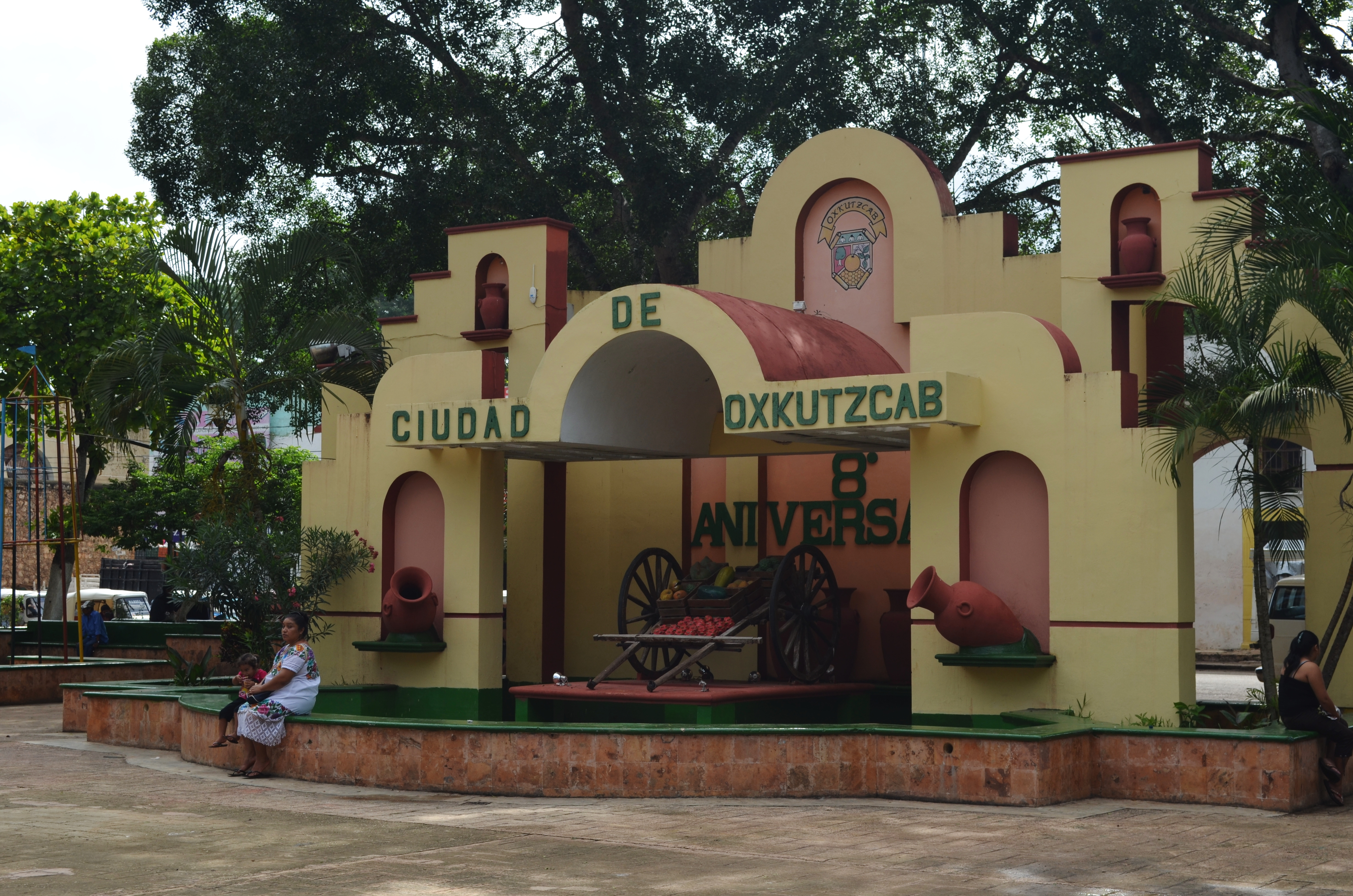

== History ==
Oxkutzcab was a town dating back to pre-Columbian times. With the fall of Mayapán in the 1440s, Oxkutzcab became a regional capital ruled by the Xiu family. After the Spanish conquest of Yucatán it was re-established as a Spanish colonial town in 1550; the Maya temples were demolished and a large Franciscan church built.

Oxkutzcab was granted the legal status of a city in the early 19th century. In 1847 the city was sacked in the Caste War of Yucatán. In 1879 the city was linked to the capital of Mérida by railroad.

== Culture ==
Each year during the last days of November, the city hosts a "Festival of Oranges". There are two markets of tropical fruits: the "20 de Noviembre" market and "Solidarity" market, better known as "La central".

== Demographics ==
View chart definition.

== Climate ==
Oxkutzkab

Climate chart (precipitation, max. and min. temperature)
J	F	M	A	M	J	J	A	S	O	N	D
58 25 17	25 28 19	25 30 20	100 32 22	157 33 23	191 29 21	202 28 21	231 27 22	259 26 21	201 25 20	72 26 18	42 24 17
- █ Average max. and min. temperatures in °C
- █ Precipitation totals in mm
Imperial conversion
J	F	M	A	M	J	J	A	S	O	N	D
2.3 77 63	1 82 66	1 86 68	3.9 90 72	6.2 91 73	7.5 84 70	8 82 70	9.1 81 72	10 79 70	7.9 77 68	2.8 79 64	1.7 75 63
- █ Average max. and min. temperatures in °F
- █ Precipitation totals in inches
