= Solar eclipse of October 3, 2005 =

21st-century annular solar eclipse

- Annular eclipse
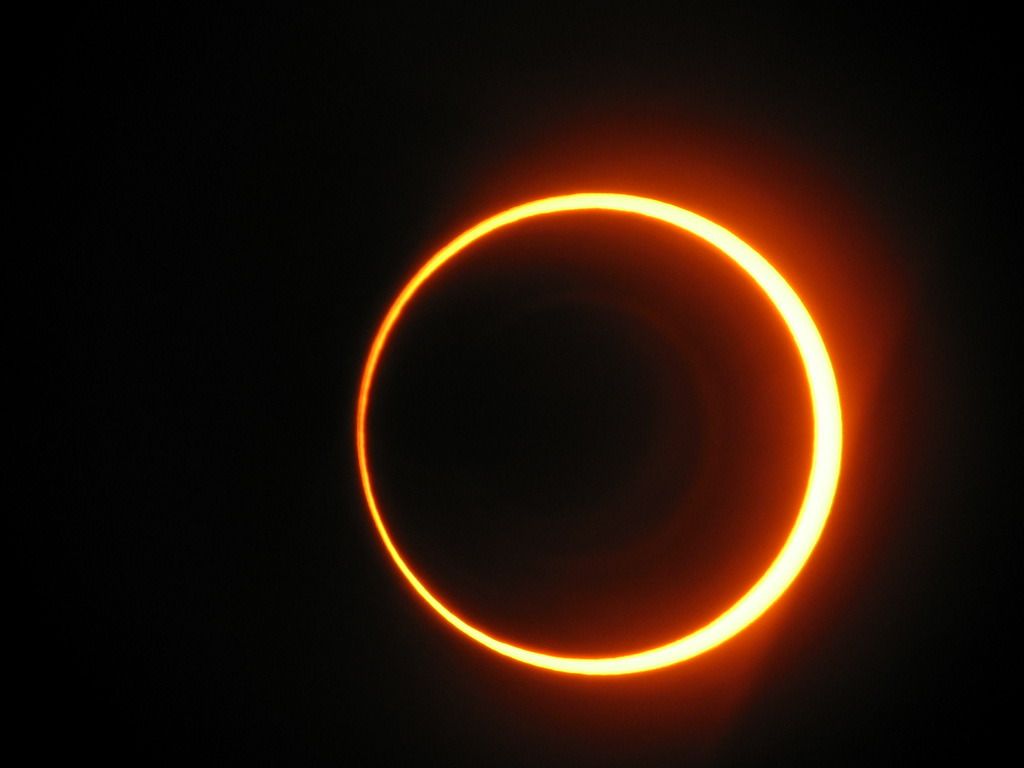
- Annular from Madrid, Spain

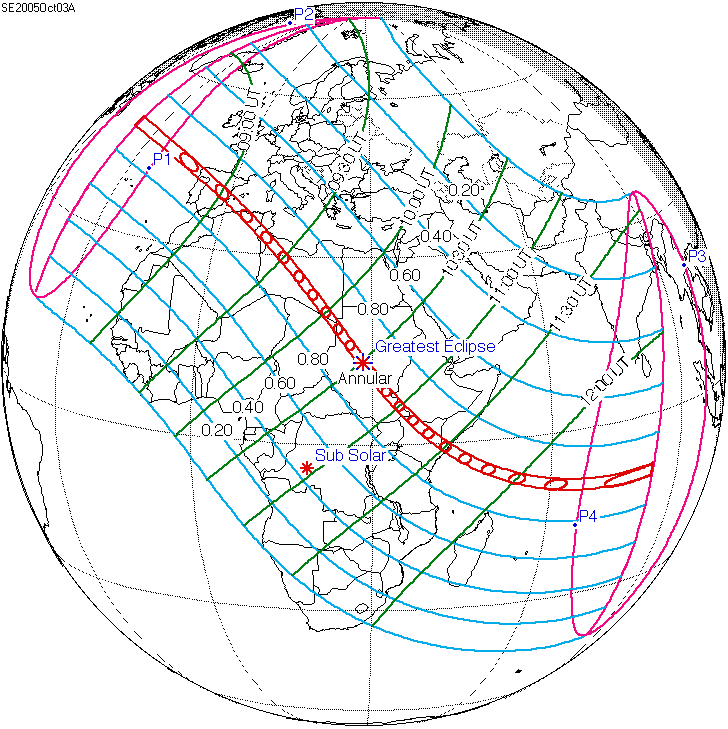
- Map
- Gamma: 0.3306
- Magnitude: 0.9576

Maximum eclipse
- Duration: 272 s (4 min 32 s)
- Coordinates: 12.9°N 28.7°E
- Max. width of band: 162 km (101 mi)

Times (UTC)
- (P1) Partial begin: 3:53:56
- (U1) Total begin: 18:40:59
- Greatest eclipse: 10:32:47
- (U4) Total end: 1:22:35
- (P4) Partial end: 24:27:52

References
- Saros: 134 (43 of 71)
- Catalog # (SE5000): 9520

An annular solar eclipse occurred at the Moon's descending node of orbit on Monday, October 3, 2005, with a magnitude of 0.958. A solar eclipse occurs when the Moon passes between Earth and the Sun, thereby totally or partly obscuring the image of the Sun for a viewer on Earth. An annular solar eclipse occurs when the Moon's apparent diameter is smaller than the Sun's, blocking most of the Sun's light and causing the Sun to look like an annulus (ring). An annular eclipse appears as a partial eclipse over a region of the Earth thousands of kilometres wide. Occurring about 4.75 days after apogee (on September 28, 2005, at 16:20 UTC), the Moon's apparent diameter was smaller.

Annularity was visible from a narrow corridor through Portugal, Spain, Algeria, Tunisia, Libya, Chad, Sudan, Ethiopia, Kenya and Somalia. A partial eclipse was seen from the much broader path of the Moon's penumbra, including most of Europe, Africa, the Middle East, and South Asia. Another solar eclipse in Africa occurred just 6 months later.

== Visibility ==
Animated path

The path of the eclipse began in the North Atlantic ocean at 08:41 universal time (UT). The antumbra reached Madrid, Spain at 08:56 UT, lasting four minutes and eleven seconds and 90% of the Sun was covered by the Moon. The antumbra reached Algiers at 09:05 UT, then passed through Tunisia and Libya before heading southeast through Sudan, Kenya and Somalia. The shadow then moved out over the Indian Ocean until it terminated at sunset, 12:22 UT.

The maximum eclipse duration occurred in central Sudan at 10:31:42 UT, where it lasted for 4m 31s when the Sun was 71° above the horizon.

The motion of the shadow was supersonic and it generated gravity waves that were detectable as disturbances in the ionosphere. These gravity waves originate in the thermosphere at an altitude of about 180 km. Because of the obscuration of solar radiation, the ionization level dropped by 70% during the eclipse. The eclipse caused a 1–1.4 K drop in the temperature of the ionosphere.

== Eclipse timing ==
=== Places experiencing annular eclipse ===
Solar Eclipse of October 3, 2005 (Local Times)
Country or territory	City or place	Start of partial eclipse	Start of annular eclipse	Maximum eclipse	End of annular eclipse	End of partial eclipse	Duration of annularity (min:s)	Duration of eclipse (hr:min)	Maximum coverage
Portugal	Viana do Castelo	08:38:04	09:51:57	09:53:09	09:54:22	11:15:57	2:25	2:38	90.17%
Spain	Vigo	09:38:12	10:51:12	10:53:13	10:55:14	12:15:51	4:02	2:38	90.16%
Portugal	Braga	08:38:12	09:52:17	09:53:30	09:54:42	11:16:32	2:25	2:38	90.19%
Portugal	Guimarães	08:38:14	09:52:37	09:53:37	09:54:36	11:16:46	1:59	2:39	90.20%
Spain	Ourense	09:38:33	10:51:54	10:53:55	10:55:56	12:16:53	4:02	2:38	90.19%
Spain	Ponferrada	09:39:06	10:54:13	10:54:59	10:55:42	12:18:22	1:29	2:39	90.23%
Portugal	Miranda do Douro	08:39:03	09:53:17	09:55:21	09:57:26	11:19:23	4:09	2:40	90.27%
Spain	Zamora	09:39:17	10:53:47	10:55:49	10:57:52	12:20:04	4:05	2:41	90.29%
Spain	Salamanca	09:39:16	10:54:01	10:55:59	10:57:56	12:20:31	3:55	2:41	90.30%
Spain	Valladolid	09:39:47	10:55:23	10:56:43	10:58:04	12:21:20	2:41	2:42	90.32%
Spain	Ávila	09:39:41	10:54:56	10:56:57	10:58:57	12:22:03	4:01	2:42	90.35%
Spain	Segovia	09:39:59	10:55:25	10:57:26	10:59:25	12:22:38	4:00	2:43	90.36%
Spain	Toledo	09:40:00	10:56:33	10:57:47	10:58:59	12:23:32	2:26	2:44	90.39%
Spain	Madrid	09:40:10	10:55:51	10:57:57	11:00:01	12:23:35	4:10	2:43	90.39%
Spain	Guadalajara	09:40:27	10:56:29	10:58:25	11:00:21	12:24:11	3:52	2:44	90.40%
Spain	Cuenca	09:40:59	10:57:34	10:59:36	11:01:37	12:26:04	4:03	2:45	90.45%
Spain	Albacete	09:41:11	10:58:48	11:00:16	11:01:43	12:27:22	2:55	2:46	90.49%
Spain	Valencia	09:42:01	10:59:48	11:01:38	11:03:28	12:29:08	3:40	2:47	90.53%
Spain	Alicante	09:42:03	11:00:33	11:02:01	11:03:27	12:30:02	2:54	2:48	90.56%
Spain	Villajoyosa	09:42:11	11:00:18	11:02:12	11:04:07	12:30:16	3:49	2:48	90.57%
Spain	Benidorm	09:42:14	11:00:19	11:02:18	11:04:17	12:30:23	3:58	2:48	90.57%
Spain	Sant Antoni de Portmany	09:43:07	11:02:33	11:03:41	11:04:48	12:32:05	2:15	2:49	90.60%
Spain	Ibiza	09:43:12	11:02:42	11:03:52	11:05:01	12:32:21	2:19	2:49	90.61%
Algeria	Algiers	08:44:43	10:05:05	10:06:58	10:08:51	11:37:16	3:46	2:53	90.73%
Tunisia	Gafsa	08:50:20	10:14:58	10:16:22	10:17:46	11:49:59	2:48	3:00	90.99%
Tunisia	Medenine	08:52:34	10:18:59	10:19:55	10:20:50	11:54:38	1:51	3:02	91.07%
South Sudan	Malakal	12:01:19	13:43:50	13:46:00	13:48:10	15:26:24	4:20	3:25	91.83%
Somalia	Kismayo	12:48:38	14:29:36	14:30:48	14:32:00	16:01:26	2:24	3:13	91.44%

=== Places experiencing partial eclipse ===
Solar Eclipse of October 3, 2005 (Local Times)
Country or territory	City or place	Start of partial eclipse	Maximum eclipse	End of partial eclipse	Duration of eclipse (hr:min)	Maximum coverage
Portugal	Lisbon	08:38:00	09:53:17	11:16:44	2:39	81.86%
Morocco	Casablanca	07:40:46	08:56:39	10:21:16	2:41	67.03%
Ireland	Dublin	08:47:24	09:57:25	11:12:24	2:25	57.88%
Gibraltar	Gibraltar	09:40:11	10:57:48	12:23:55	2:44	78.42%
United Kingdom	London	08:48:53	10:01:08	11:18:26	2:30	56.96%
Andorra	Andorra la Vella	09:43:39	11:02:38	12:28:43	2:45	81.17%
France	Paris	09:48:01	11:02:48	12:23:05	2:35	61.50%
Spain	Barcelona	09:43:51	11:03:40	12:30:45	2:47	83.56%
Belgium	Brussels	09:51:35	11:04:44	12:22:44	2:31	53.67%
Monaco	Monaco	09:48:54	11:08:35	12:34:24	2:46	68.86%
Algeria	Constantine	08:47:38	10:11:46	11:43:32	2:56	90.53%
Vatican City	Vatican City	09:53:29	11:15:23	12:43:01	2:50	65.63%
Italy	Rome	09:53:31	11:15:26	12:43:04	2:50	65.59%
Tunisia	Tunis	08:50:51	10:16:08	11:48:24	2:58	83.44%
Malta	Valletta	09:55:56	11:23:02	12:56:22	3:00	77.49%
Libya	Tripoli	09:55:42	11:24:24	12:59:57	3:04	87.97%
Egypt	Cairo	10:27:37	11:59:08	13:31:41	3:04	53.83%
Chad	Faya-Largeau	09:22:44	11:00:48	12:42:41	3:20	79.66%
Chad	Fada	09:27:30	11:07:13	12:49:39	3:22	84.80%
Sudan	Khartoum	11:50:01	13:32:46	15:12:44	3:23	79.43%
South Sudan	Juba	12:12:57	13:57:31	15:36:28	3:24	85.34%
Ethiopia	Addis Ababa	12:18:07	14:01:53	15:37:43	3:20	78.06%
Uganda	Kampala	12:27:09	14:10:26	15:46:36	3:19	77.17%
Rwanda	Kigali	11:30:04	13:11:00	14:45:38	3:16	65.28%
Kenya	Nairobi	12:39:07	14:22:08	15:55:48	3:17	83.19%
Somalia	Mogadishu	12:49:48	14:30:55	16:00:00	3:10	81.33%
Tanzania	Dar es Salaam	12:58:45	14:37:53	16:06:31	3:08	73.40%
Comoros	Moroni	13:18:33	14:52:19	16:15:09	2:57	66.02%
Seychelles	Victoria	14:26:29	15:58:42	17:17:46	2:51	86.13%
British Indian Ocean Territory	Diego Garcia	16:58:43	18:16:22	19:04:50 (sunset)	2:06	85.49%

== Gallery ==
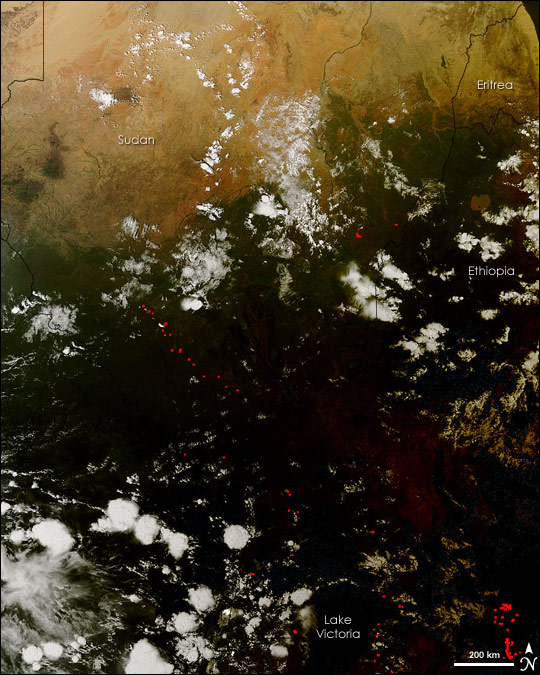
Satellite image showing the Moon's shadow over East Africa

Animation from Medina del Campo, Spain

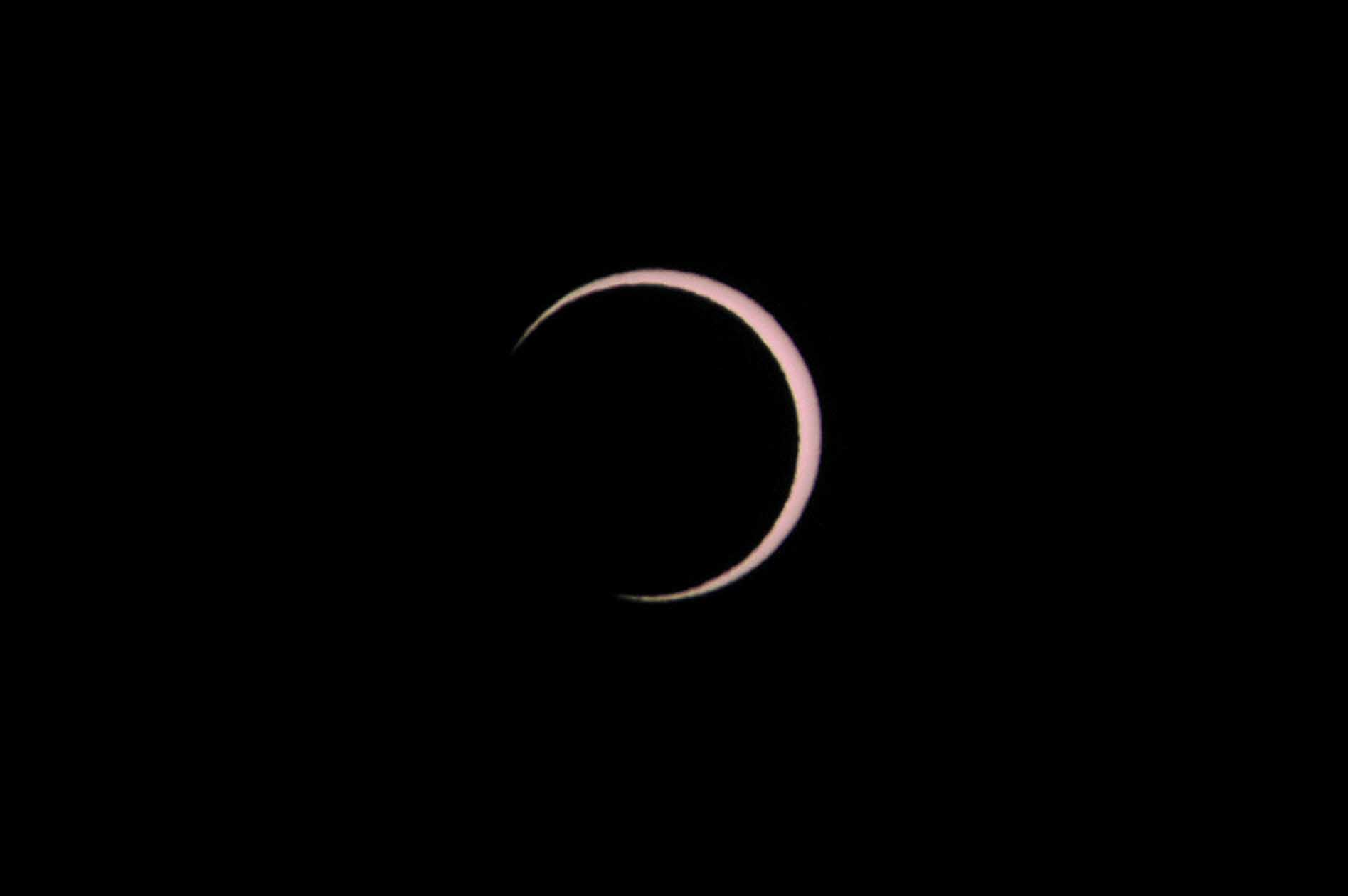
Santa Maria de Lamas, Portugal (9:00 UTC)

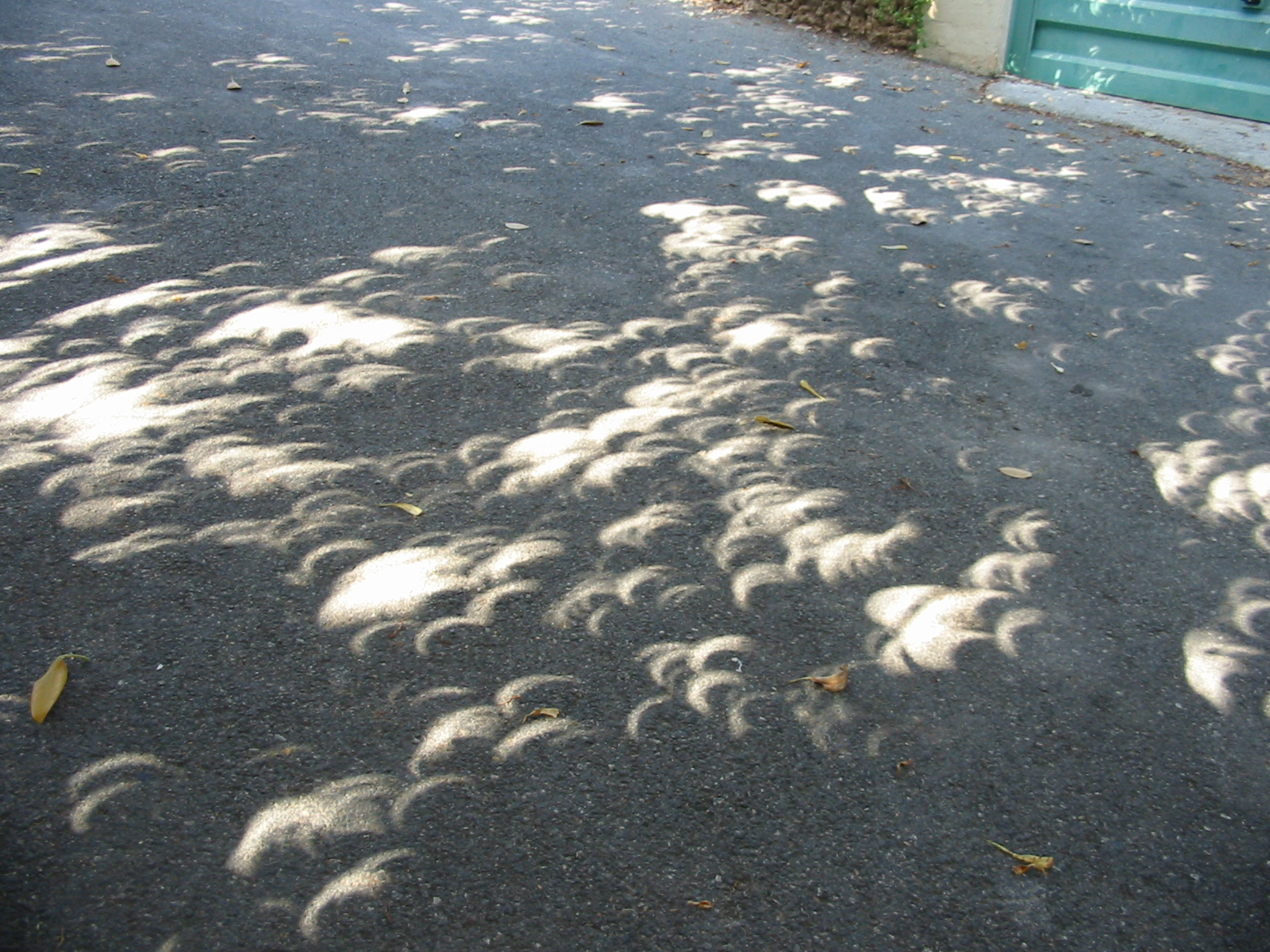
Eclipse projection through leaves in St. Julian's, Malta

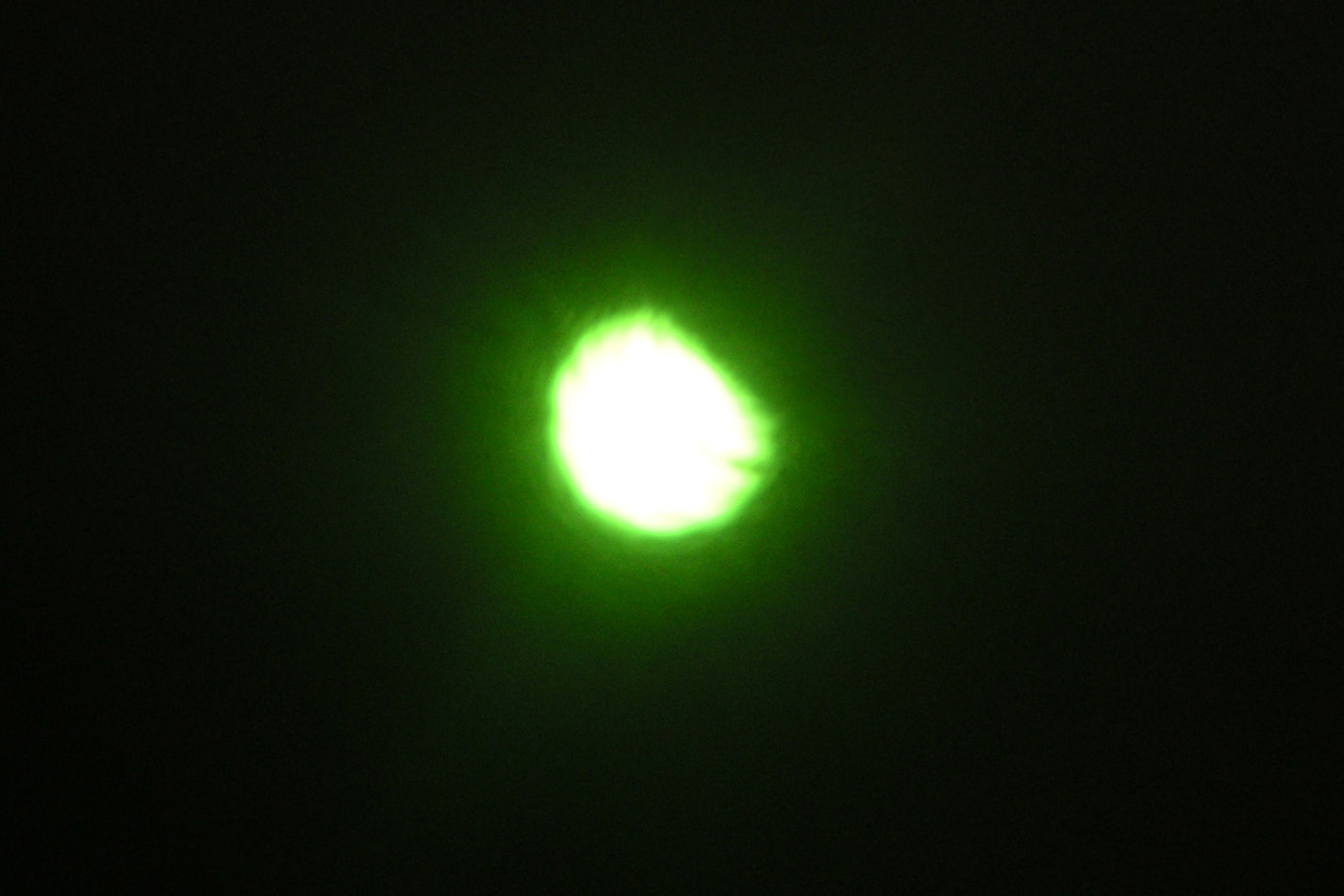
Saintes, France (9:36 UTC)

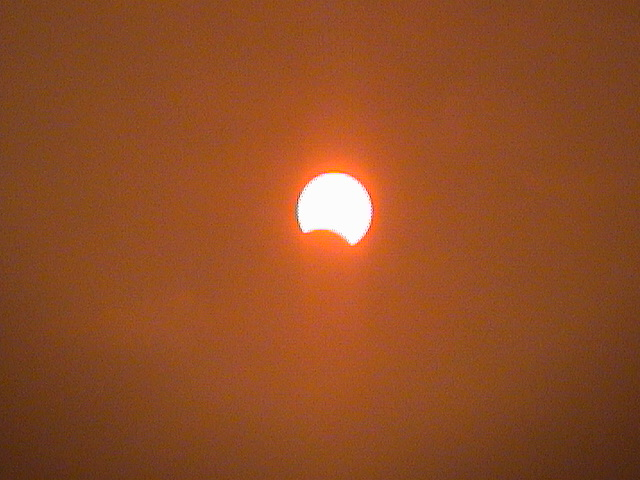
Chennai, India (11:33 UTC)

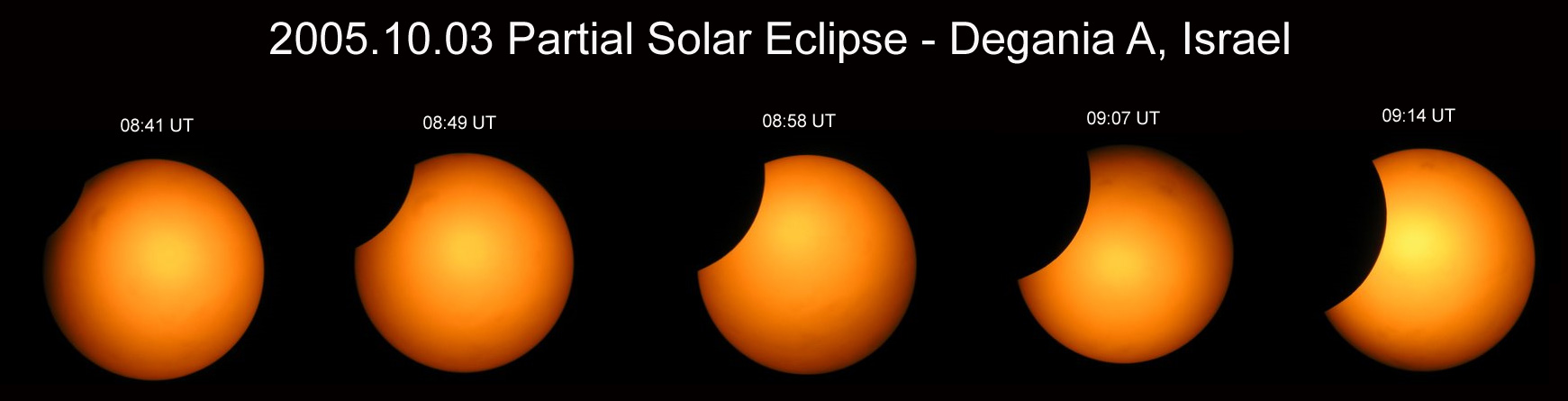
Eclipse sequence from Degania A, Israel

== Eclipse details ==
Shown below are two tables displaying details about this particular solar eclipse. The first table outlines times at which the Moon's penumbra or umbra attains the specific parameter, and the second table describes various other parameters pertaining to this eclipse.

October 3, 2005 Solar Eclipse Times
Event	Time (UTC)
First Penumbral External Contact	2005 October 3 at 07:36:39.6 UTC
First Umbral External Contact	2005 October 3 at 08:42:04.1 UTC
First Central Line	2005 October 3 at 08:44:06.1 UTC
First Umbral Internal Contact	2005 October 3 at 08:46:08.3 UTC
First Penumbral Internal Contact	2005 October 3 at 10:00:20.1 UTC
Equatorial Conjunction	2005 October 3 at 10:11:46.9 UTC
Ecliptic Conjunction	2005 October 3 at 10:28:57.3 UTC
Greatest Eclipse	2005 October 3 at 10:32:47.3 UTC
Greatest Duration	2005 October 3 at 10:38:04.7 UTC
Last Penumbral Internal Contact	2005 October 3 at 11:05:45.4 UTC
Last Umbral Internal Contact	2005 October 3 at 12:19:41.4 UTC
Last Central Line	2005 October 3 at 12:21:40.9 UTC
Last Umbral External Contact	2005 October 3 at 12:23:40.2 UTC
Last Penumbral External Contact	2005 October 3 at 13:28:57.9 UTC

October 3, 2005 Solar Eclipse Parameters
Parameter	Value
Eclipse Magnitude	0.95759
Eclipse Obscuration	0.91698
Gamma	0.33058
Sun Right Ascension	12h37m55.0s
Sun Declination	-04°05'04.2"
Sun Semi-Diameter	15'59.1"
Sun Equatorial Horizontal Parallax	08.8"
Moon Right Ascension	12h38m30.3s
Moon Declination	-03°49'04.7"
Moon Semi-Diameter	15'05.2"
Moon Equatorial Horizontal Parallax	0°55'22.1"
ΔT	64.8 s

== Eclipse season ==
This eclipse is part of an eclipse season, a period, roughly every six months, when eclipses occur. Only two (or occasionally three) eclipse seasons occur each year, and each season lasts about 35 days and repeats just short of six months (173 days) later; thus two full eclipse seasons always occur each year. Either two or three eclipses happen each eclipse season. In the sequence below, each eclipse is separated by a fortnight.

Eclipse season of October 2005
October 3 Descending node (new moon)	October 17 Ascending node (full moon)
Annular solar eclipse Solar Saros 134	Partial lunar eclipse Lunar Saros 146

== Related eclipses ==
=== Eclipses in 2005 ===
- A hybrid solar eclipse on April 8.
- A penumbral lunar eclipse on April 24.
- An annular solar eclipse on October 3.
- A partial lunar eclipse on October 17.

=== Metonic ===
- Preceded by: Solar eclipse of December 14, 2001
- Followed by: Solar eclipse of July 22, 2009

=== Tzolkinex ===
- Preceded by: Solar eclipse of August 22, 1998
- Followed by: Solar eclipse of November 13, 2012

=== Half-Saros ===
- Preceded by: Lunar eclipse of September 27, 1996
- Followed by: Lunar eclipse of October 8, 2014

=== Tritos ===
- Preceded by: Solar eclipse of November 3, 1994
- Followed by: Solar eclipse of September 1, 2016

=== Solar Saros 134 ===
- Preceded by: Solar eclipse of September 23, 1987
- Followed by: Solar eclipse of October 14, 2023

=== Inex ===
- Preceded by: Solar eclipse of October 23, 1976
- Followed by: Solar eclipse of September 12, 2034

=== Triad ===
- Preceded by: Solar eclipse of December 3, 1918
- Followed by: Solar eclipse of August 3, 2092

=== Solar eclipses of 2004–2007 ===
This eclipse is a member of a semester series. An eclipse in a semester series of solar eclipses repeats approximately every 177 days and 4 hours (a semester) at alternating nodes of the Moon's orbit.

Solar eclipse series sets from 2004 to 2007
Ascending node			Descending node		
Saros	Map	Gamma	Saros	Map	Gamma
119	April 19, 2004 Partial	−1.13345	124	October 14, 2004 Partial	1.03481
129 Partial in Naiguatá, Venezuela	April 8, 2005 Hybrid	−0.34733	134 Annularity in Madrid, Spain	October 3, 2005 Annular	0.33058
139 Totality in Side, Turkey	March 29, 2006 Total	0.38433	144 Partial in São Paulo, Brazil	September 22, 2006 Annular	−0.40624
149 Partial in Jaipur, India	March 19, 2007 Partial	1.07277	154 Partial in Córdoba, Argentina	September 11, 2007 Partial	−1.12552

=== Saros 134 ===
This eclipse is a part of Saros series 134, repeating every 18 years, 11 days, and containing 71 events. The series started with a partial solar eclipse on June 22, 1248. It contains total eclipses from October 9, 1428 through December 24, 1554; hybrid eclipses from January 3, 1573 through June 27, 1843; and annular eclipses from July 8, 1861 through May 21, 2384. The series ends at member 72 as a partial eclipse on August 6, 2510. Its eclipses are tabulated in three columns; every third eclipse in the same column is one exeligmos apart, so they all cast shadows over approximately the same parts of the Earth.

The longest duration of totality was produced by member 11 at 1 minutes, 30 seconds on October 9, 1428, and the longest duration of annularity will be produced by member 52 at 10 minutes, 55 seconds on January 10, 2168. All eclipses in this series occur at the Moon’s descending node of orbit.

Series members 32–53 occur between 1801 and 2200:
32	33	34
June 6, 1807	June 16, 1825	June 27, 1843
35	36	37
July 8, 1861	July 19, 1879	July 29, 1897
38	39	40
August 10, 1915	August 21, 1933	September 1, 1951
41	42	43
September 11, 1969	September 23, 1987	October 3, 2005
44	45	46
October 14, 2023	October 25, 2041	November 5, 2059
47	48	49
November 15, 2077	November 27, 2095	December 8, 2113
50	51	52
December 19, 2131	December 30, 2149	January 10, 2168
53
January 20, 2186

=== Metonic series ===
The metonic series repeats eclipses every 19 years (6939.69 days), lasting about 5 cycles. Eclipses occur in nearly the same calendar date. In addition, the octon subseries repeats 1/5 of that or every 3.8 years (1387.94 days). All eclipses in this table occur at the Moon's descending node.

21 eclipse events between July 22, 1971 and July 22, 2047
July 22	May 9–11	February 26–27	December 14–15	October 2–3
116	118	120	122	124
July 22, 1971	May 11, 1975	February 26, 1979	December 15, 1982	October 3, 1986
126	128	130	132	134
July 22, 1990	May 10, 1994	February 26, 1998	December 14, 2001	October 3, 2005
136	138	140	142	144
July 22, 2009	May 10, 2013	February 26, 2017	December 14, 2020	October 2, 2024
146	148	150	152	154
July 22, 2028	May 9, 2032	February 27, 2036	December 15, 2039	October 3, 2043
156
July 22, 2047

=== Tritos series ===
This eclipse is a part of a tritos cycle, repeating at alternating nodes every 135 synodic months (≈ 3986.63 days, or 11 years minus 1 month). Their appearance and longitude are irregular due to a lack of synchronization with the anomalistic month (period of perigee), but groupings of 3 tritos cycles (≈ 33 years minus 3 months) come close (≈ 434.044 anomalistic months), so eclipses are similar in these groupings.

Series members between 1801 and 2200
April 14, 1809 (Saros 116)	March 14, 1820 (Saros 117)	February 12, 1831 (Saros 118)	January 11, 1842 (Saros 119)	December 11, 1852 (Saros 120)
November 11, 1863 (Saros 121)	October 10, 1874 (Saros 122)	September 8, 1885 (Saros 123)	August 9, 1896 (Saros 124)	July 10, 1907 (Saros 125)
June 8, 1918 (Saros 126)	May 9, 1929 (Saros 127)	April 7, 1940 (Saros 128)	March 7, 1951 (Saros 129)	February 5, 1962 (Saros 130)
January 4, 1973 (Saros 131)	December 4, 1983 (Saros 132)	November 3, 1994 (Saros 133)	October 3, 2005 (Saros 134)	September 1, 2016 (Saros 135)
August 2, 2027 (Saros 136)	July 2, 2038 (Saros 137)	May 31, 2049 (Saros 138)	April 30, 2060 (Saros 139)	March 31, 2071 (Saros 140)
February 27, 2082 (Saros 141)	January 27, 2093 (Saros 142)	December 29, 2103 (Saros 143)	November 27, 2114 (Saros 144)	October 26, 2125 (Saros 145)
September 26, 2136 (Saros 146)	August 26, 2147 (Saros 147)	July 25, 2158 (Saros 148)	June 25, 2169 (Saros 149)	May 24, 2180 (Saros 150)
April 23, 2191 (Saros 151)

=== Inex series ===
This eclipse is a part of the long period inex cycle, repeating at alternating nodes, every 358 synodic months (≈ 10,571.95 days, or 29 years minus 20 days). Their appearance and longitude are irregular due to a lack of synchronization with the anomalistic month (period of perigee). However, groupings of 3 inex cycles (≈ 87 years minus 2 months) comes close (≈ 1,151.02 anomalistic months), so eclipses are similar in these groupings.

Series members between 1801 and 2200
February 21, 1803 (Saros 127)	February 1, 1832 (Saros 128)	January 11, 1861 (Saros 129)
December 22, 1889 (Saros 130)	December 3, 1918 (Saros 131)	November 12, 1947 (Saros 132)
October 23, 1976 (Saros 133)	October 3, 2005 (Saros 134)	September 12, 2034 (Saros 135)
August 24, 2063 (Saros 136)	August 3, 2092 (Saros 137)	July 14, 2121 (Saros 138)
June 25, 2150 (Saros 139)	June 5, 2179 (Saros 140)	
