= Solar eclipse of July 22, 2009 =

Total eclipse

- Total eclipse
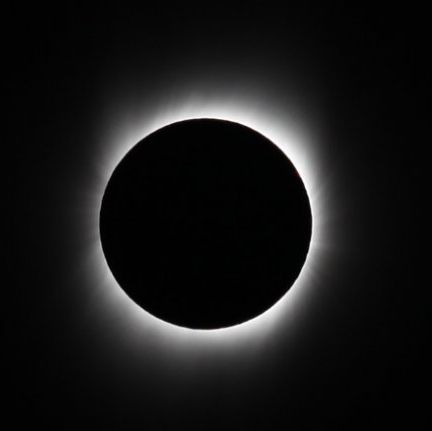
- Totality from Kurigram District, Bangladesh

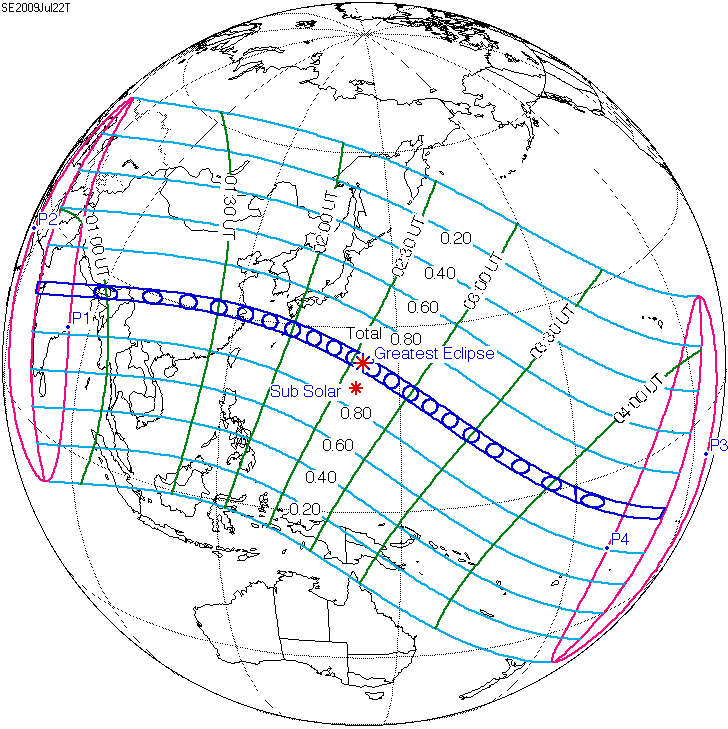
- Map
- Gamma: 0.0698
- Magnitude: 1.0799

Maximum eclipse
- Duration: 399 s (6 min 39 s)
- Coordinates: 24.2°N 144.1°E
- Max. width of band: 258 km (160 mi)

Times (UTC)
- (P1) Partial begin: 23:58:18
- (U1) Total begin: 0:51:16
- Greatest eclipse: 2:36:25
- (U4) Total end: 4:19:26
- (P4) Partial end: 5:12:25

References
- Saros: 136 (37 of 71)
- Catalog # (SE5000): 9528

A total solar eclipse occurred at the Moon's descending node of orbit on Wednesday, July 22, 2009, with a magnitude of 1.07991. A solar eclipse occurs when the Moon passes between Earth and the Sun, thereby totally or partly obscuring the image of the Sun for a viewer on Earth. A total solar eclipse occurs when the Moon's apparent diameter is larger than the Sun's, blocking all direct sunlight, turning day into darkness. Totality occurs in a narrow path across Earth's surface, with the partial solar eclipse visible over a surrounding region thousands of kilometres wide. Occurring about 5.5 hours after perigee (on July 21, 2009, at 21:10 UTC), the Moon's apparent diameter was larger.

This was the longest total solar eclipse during the 21st century, with totality lasting a maximum of 6 minutes and 38.86 seconds off the coast of Southeast Asia, causing tourist interest in eastern China, Pakistan, Japan, India, Nepal and Bangladesh.

== Visibility ==
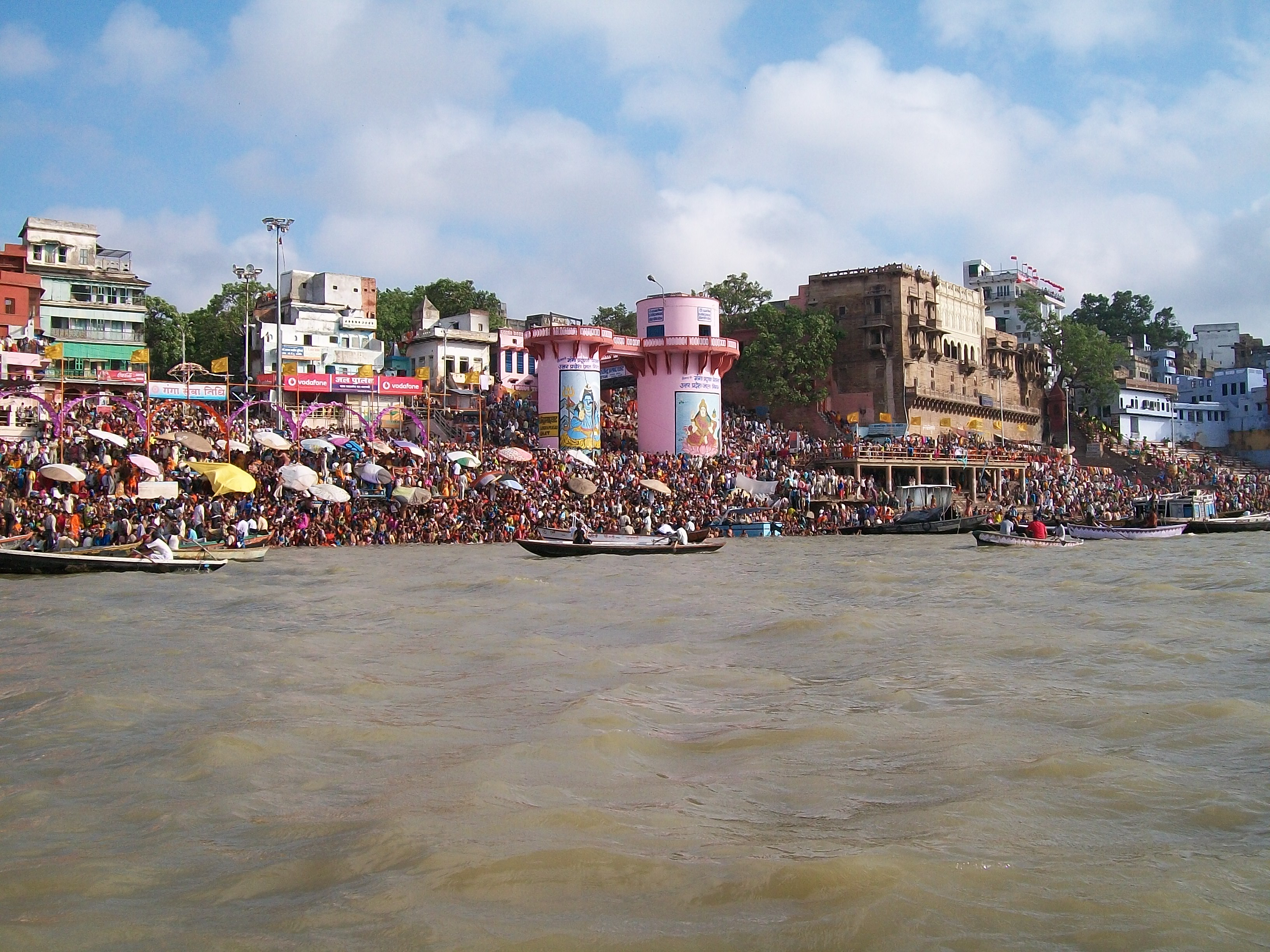
View from a boat in Ganges

The total eclipse was visible from a narrow corridor through northern India, eastern Nepal, northern Bangladesh, Bhutan, the northern tip of Myanmar, central China and the Pacific Ocean, including the northern part of the Ryukyu Islands, the whole Volcano Islands except South Iwo Jima, Marshall Islands, and Kiribati.

Totality was visible in many large cities, including Dhaka and Dinajpur, and Chapai Nawabganj district in Bangladesh; Surat, Vadodara, Bhopal, Varanasi, Patna, Gaya, Siliguri, Tawang and Guwahati in India; and Chengdu, Nanchong, Chongqing, Yichang, Jingzhou, Wuhan, Huanggang, Hefei, Hangzhou, Wuxi, Huzhou, Suzhou, Jiaxing, Ningbo, Shanghai as well as over the Three Gorges Dam in China. However, in Shanghai, the largest city in the eclipse's path, the view was obscured by heavy clouds. According to NASA, the Japanese island Kitaio Jima was predicted to have the best viewing conditions featuring both longer viewing time (being the closest point of land to the point of greatest eclipse) and lower cloud cover statistics than all of continental Asia.

Most of the path of totality was west of the 180th meridian, with only Nikumaroro in Kiribati east of it. However, time zone of the Phoenix Islands including Nikumaroro was changed from UTC−11 to UTC+13 in 1995, so total eclipse visible from land was completely on July 22.

A partial eclipse was seen within the broad path of the Moon's penumbra, including most of Southeast Asia (all of Pakistan, India and China), East Asia, northern Oceania, and Hawaii. Most of these areas are west of the 180th meridian, seeing the eclipse on July 22, while a part of islands in the Pacific are east of the 180th meridian, seeing the eclipse on July 21.

The eclipse, and the reaction of thousands of observers at Varanasi was captured by the Science Channel Wonders of the Solar System series hosted by Brian Cox.

This eclipse may be the most-viewed total solar eclipse in history, with 30 million people in Shanghai and Hangzhou alone.

== Observations ==
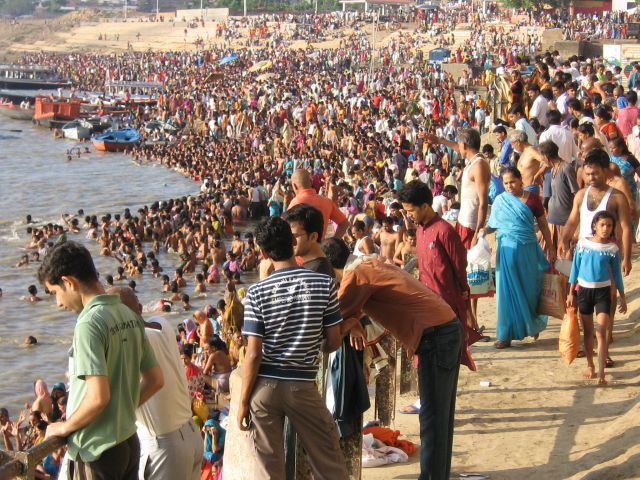
Crowds gather on the ghats of Ganges for the eclipse in Varanasi, India.

Thousands of pilgrims gathered on the banks of the Ganges River in Varanasi, India to experience the eclipse as a religious or spiritual event. Some people expected that there would be a relationship, either positive or negative, between their health and the occurrence of the eclipse.

Indian scientists observed the solar eclipse from an Indian Air Force plane.

The Chinese government used the opportunity to provide scientific education and to dispel any superstition. A flight by China Eastern Airlines from Wuhan to Shanghai took a slight detour and followed the course of the eclipse to allow longer observation time for the scientists on board.

Observers in Japan were excited by the prospect of experiencing the first eclipse in 46 years, but found the experience dampened by cloudy skies obscuring the view.

In Bangladesh, where the eclipse lasted approximately 3 minutes and 44 seconds, thousands of people were able to witness the eclipse despite rain and overcast skies.

== Duration ==
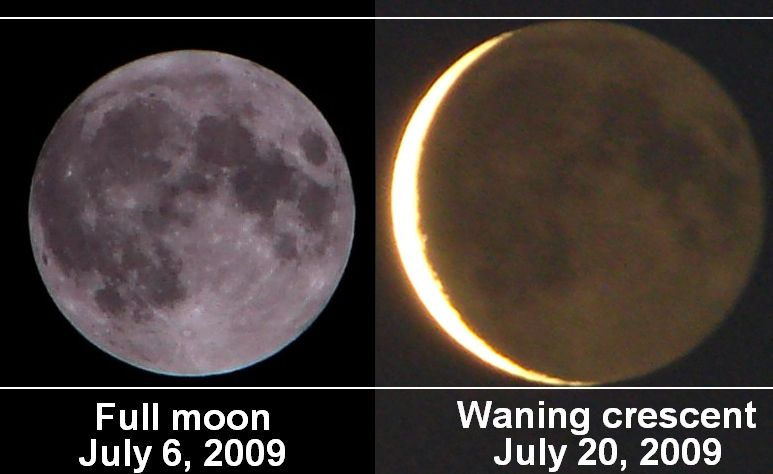
These identically scaled photos compare the apparent diameter of the full moon (near apogee) to the nearly new moon (visible by earthshine) on the day before the solar eclipse near lunar perigee.

This solar eclipse was the longest total solar eclipse to occur in the 21st century, and will not be surpassed in duration until 13 June 2132 (Saros 139, ascending node) which will last for 6 minutes and 55 seconds. Totality lasted for up to 6 minutes and 38.86 seconds (0.14 seconds shorter than 6 minutes and 39 seconds), with the maximum eclipse occurring in the ocean at 02:35:21 UTC about 100 km south of the Bonin Islands, southeast of Japan. The uninhabited North Iwo Jima island was the landmass with totality time closest to maximum, while the closest inhabited point was Akusekijima, where the eclipse lasted 6 minutes and 26 seconds.

The cruise ship Costa Classica was chartered specifically to view this eclipse and by viewing the eclipse at the point of maximum duration and cruising along the centerline during the event, duration was extended to 6 minutes, 42 seconds.

The eclipse was part of Saros series 136, descending node, as was the solar eclipse of July 11, 1991, which was slightly longer, lasting up to 6 minutes 53.08 seconds (previous eclipses of the same saros series on June 30, 1973, and June 20, 1955, were longer, lasting 7 min 03.55 and 7 min 07.74, respectively). The next event from this series will be on August 2, 2027 (6 minutes and 22.64 seconds). The exceptional duration was a result of the Moon being near perigee, with the apparent diameter of the Moon 7.991% larger than the Sun (magnitude 1.07991) and the Earth being near aphelion where the Sun appeared slightly smaller.

In contrast the annular solar eclipse of January 26, 2009 (Saros 131, ascending node) occurred 3.3 days after lunar apogee and 7.175% smaller apparent diameter to the Sun. And the next solar eclipse of January 15, 2010 (Saros 141, ascending node) was also annular, 1.8 days before lunar apogee, with the Moon 8.097% smaller than the Sun.

== Eclipse timing ==
=== Places experiencing total eclipse ===
Solar eclipse of July 22, 2009 (local times)
| Country or territory | City or place | Start of partial eclipse | Start of total eclipse | Maximum eclipse | End of total eclipse | End of partial eclipse | Duration of totality (min:s) | Duration of eclipse (hr:min) | Maximum magnitude |
|---|---|---|---|---|---|---|---|---|---|
| India | Surat | 06:08:26 (sunrise) | 06:21:17 | 06:22:54 | 06:24:32 | 07:19:49 | 3:15 | 1:11 | 1.0306 |
| India | Vadodara | 06:04:56 (sunrise) | 06:22:45 | 06:23:20 | 06:23:55 | 07:20:24 | 1:10 | 1:15 | 1.0025 |
| India | Indore | 05:53:29 (sunrise) | 06:21:56 | 06:23:28 | 06:25:01 | 07:21:47 | 3:05 | 1:28 | 1.0194 |
| India | Bhopal | 05:46:24 (sunrise) | 06:22:13 | 06:23:47 | 06:25:22 | 07:22:49 | 3:09 | 1:36 | 1.0196 |
| India | Jabalpur | 05:36:24 (sunrise) | 06:22:32 | 06:24:02 | 06:25:33 | 07:24:19 | 3:01 | 1:48 | 1.0154 |
| India | Damoh | 05:34:53 (sunrise) | 06:23:21 | 06:24:35 | 06:25:50 | 07:24:44 | 2:29 | 1:50 | 1.0097 |
| India | Varanasi | 05:30:04 | 06:24:13 | 06:25:44 | 06:27:14 | 07:27:32 | 3:01 | 1:57 | 1.0143 |
| India | Patna | 05:29:58 | 06:24:39 | 06:26:31 | 06:28:23 | 07:29:28 | 3:44 | 2:00 | 1.027 |
| Nepal | Biratnagar | 05:45:18 | 06:40:58 | 06:42:46 | 06:44:35 | 07:46:51 | 3:37 | 2:02 | 1.0208 |
| Nepal | Dharan | 05:45:30 | 06:41:39 | 06:42:58 | 06:44:18 | 07:47:00 | 2:39 | 2:02 | 1.0093 |
| Bangladesh | Saidpur | 06:59:58 | 07:56:42 | 07:58:09 | 07:59:36 | 09:03:12 | 2:54 | 2:03 | 1.0107 |
| India | Jalpaiguri | 05:30:13 | 06:26:15 | 06:28:13 | 06:30:13 | 07:33:00 | 3:58 | 2:03 | 1.0317 |
| India | Siliguri | 05:30:26 | 06:26:32 | 06:28:25 | 06:30:18 | 07:33:08 | 3:46 | 2:03 | 1.0236 |
| Bhutan | Phuntsholing | 06:00:33 | 06:57:00 | 06:58:57 | 07:00:56 | 08:04:13 | 3:56 | 2:04 | 1.0274 |
| Bhutan | Paro | 06:00:52 | 06:57:55 | 06:59:17 | 07:00:40 | 08:04:30 | 2:45 | 2:04 | 1.0095 |
| Bhutan | Thimphu | 06:00:54 | 06:57:59 | 06:59:25 | 07:00:52 | 08:04:45 | 2:53 | 2:04 | 1.0106 |
| India | Nalbari | 05:30:30 | 06:28:25 | 06:29:51 | 06:31:18 | 07:36:22 | 2:53 | 2:06 | 1.01 |
| Bhutan | Samdrup Jongkhar | 06:00:45 | 06:58:19 | 07:00:14 | 07:02:10 | 08:06:52 | 3:51 | 2:06 | 1.0218 |
| China | Leshan | 08:06:15 | 09:09:34 | 09:11:55 | 09:14:17 | 10:25:38 | 4:43 | 2:19 | 1.0286 |
| China | Chengdu | 08:07:06 | 09:11:10 | 09:12:46 | 09:14:24 | 10:26:20 | 3:14 | 2:19 | 1.0096 |
| China | Chongqing | 08:07:58 | 09:13:13 | 09:15:16 | 09:17:19 | 10:30:45 | 4:06 | 2:23 | 1.0157 |
| China | Wuhan | 08:14:54 | 09:23:58 | 09:26:40 | 09:29:23 | 10:46:14 | 5:25 | 2:31 | 1.0315 |
| China | Hefei | 08:18:39 | 09:30:51 | 09:31:46 | 09:32:41 | 10:52:03 | 1:50 | 2:33 | 1.0024 |
| China | Wuhu | 08:19:38 | 09:31:09 | 09:33:37 | 09:36:05 | 10:54:41 | 4:56 | 2:35 | 1.0192 |
| China | Changzhou | 08:21:45 | 09:35:38 | 09:36:28 | 09:37:18 | 10:57:52 | 1:40 | 2:36 | 1.0019 |
| China | Hangzhou | 08:21:24 | 09:34:09 | 09:36:51 | 09:39:33 | 10:59:15 | 5:24 | 2:38 | 1.0236 |
| China | Suzhou | 08:22:21 | 09:35:13 | 09:37:40 | 09:40:07 | 10:59:37 | 4:54 | 2:37 | 1.0177 |
| China | Shaoxing | 08:21:52 | 09:35:22 | 09:37:40 | 09:39:59 | 11:00:23 | 4:37 | 2:39 | 1.0147 |
| China | Shanghai | 08:23:26 | 09:36:46 | 09:39:17 | 09:41:48 | 11:01:35 | 5:02 | 2:38 | 1.0188 |
| China | Ningbo | 08:23:07 | 09:37:21 | 09:39:33 | 09:41:46 | 11:02:41 | 4:25 | 2:40 | 1.0129 |

=== Places experiencing partial eclipse ===
Solar eclipse of July 22, 2009 (local times)
| Country or territory | City or place | Start of partial eclipse | Maximum eclipse | End of partial eclipse | Duration of eclipse (hr:min) | Maximum coverage |
|---|---|---|---|---|---|---|
| India | New Delhi | 05:36:56 (sunrise) | 06:26:35 | 07:24:34 | 1:48 | 83.00% |
| Pakistan | Karachi | 06:54:55 (sunrise) | 06:57:27 | 07:49:07 | 0:54 | 82.45% |
| Nepal | Kathmandu | 05:46:11 | 06:42:44 | 07:45:30 | 1:59 | 96.57% |
| Bangladesh | Dhaka | 06:59:18 | 07:57:57 | 09:03:47 | 2:04 | 92.75% |
| Pakistan | Lahore | 06:12:25 (sunrise) | 06:58:20 | 07:53:28 | 1:41 | 68.03% |
| Myanmar | Yangon | 06:31:37 | 07:29:47 | 08:35:38 | 2:04 | 58.22% |
| Pakistan | Islamabad | 06:12:41 (sunrise) | 06:59:48 | 07:53:01 | 1:40 | 58.77% |
| Myanmar | Naypyidaw | 06:30:38 | 07:30:28 | 08:38:13 | 2:08 | 70.28% |
| China | Lhasa | 08:02:29 | 09:01:30 | 10:07:15 | 2:05 | 95.49% |
| Vietnam | Hanoi | 07:06:30 | 08:11:49 | 09:26:03 | 2:20 | 67.60% |
| Hong Kong | Hong Kong | 08:14:31 | 09:25:47 | 10:45:56 | 2:31 | 69.80% |
| China | Beijing | 08:25:12 | 09:32:17 | 10:44:29 | 2:19 | 67.49% |
| Taiwan | Taipei | 08:23:17 | 09:40:29 | 11:05:00 | 2:42 | 82.53% |
| North Korea | Pyongyang | 09:34:41 | 10:46:13 | 12:01:35 | 2:27 | 68.96% |
| South Korea | Seoul | 09:34:55 | 10:48:26 | 12:05:44 | 2:31 | 74.45% |
| Japan | Tokyo | 09:55:26 | 11:12:48 | 12:30:07 | 2:35 | 69.84% |
| Northern Mariana Islands | Saipan | 11:24:38 | 12:53:05 | 14:15:04 | 2:50 | 77.13% |
| Guam | Hagåtña | 11:25:49 | 12:53:31 | 14:14:53 | 2:49 | 68.57% |
| United States Minor Outlying Islands | Wake Island | 14:08:43 | 15:24:32 | 16:32:26 | 2:24 | 70.01% |
| Federated States of Micronesia | Palikir | 13:09:13 | 14:31:54 | 15:44:54 | 2:36 | 80.85% |
| Marshall Islands | Majuro | 14:34:10 | 15:48:58 | 16:54:56 | 2:21 | 96.47% |
| Nauru | Yaren | 14:39:05 | 15:54:04 | 17:00:07 | 2:21 | 79.04% |
| Kiribati | Tarawa | 14:44:51 | 15:57:44 | 17:02:01 | 2:17 | 99.78% |
| United States Minor Outlying Islands | Baker Island (Note: The times listed for this location occur on July 21, 2009, local time.) | 15:00:22 | 16:06:09 | 17:04:52 | 2:05 | 91.24% |
| Tuvalu | Funafuti | 15:05:32 | 16:11:24 | 17:10:14 | 2:05 | 80.31% |
| Cook Islands | Rarotonga | 17:26:00 | 18:13:59 | 18:16:24 (sunset) | 0:50 | 66.75% |
| Tokelau | Fakaofo | 16:13:40 | 17:15:30 | 18:11:16 | 1:58 | 96.40% |
| Samoa | Apia | 16:17:19 | 17:17:38 | 18:12:15 | 1:59 | 78.70% |
| American Samoa | Pago Pago | 16:18:12 | 17:18:01 | 18:11:22 (sunset) | 1:53 | 78.96% |
| Niue | Alofi | 16:22:54 | 17:19:36 | 18:00:36 (sunset) | 1:38 | 62.14% |

== Gallery ==
=== Totality ===
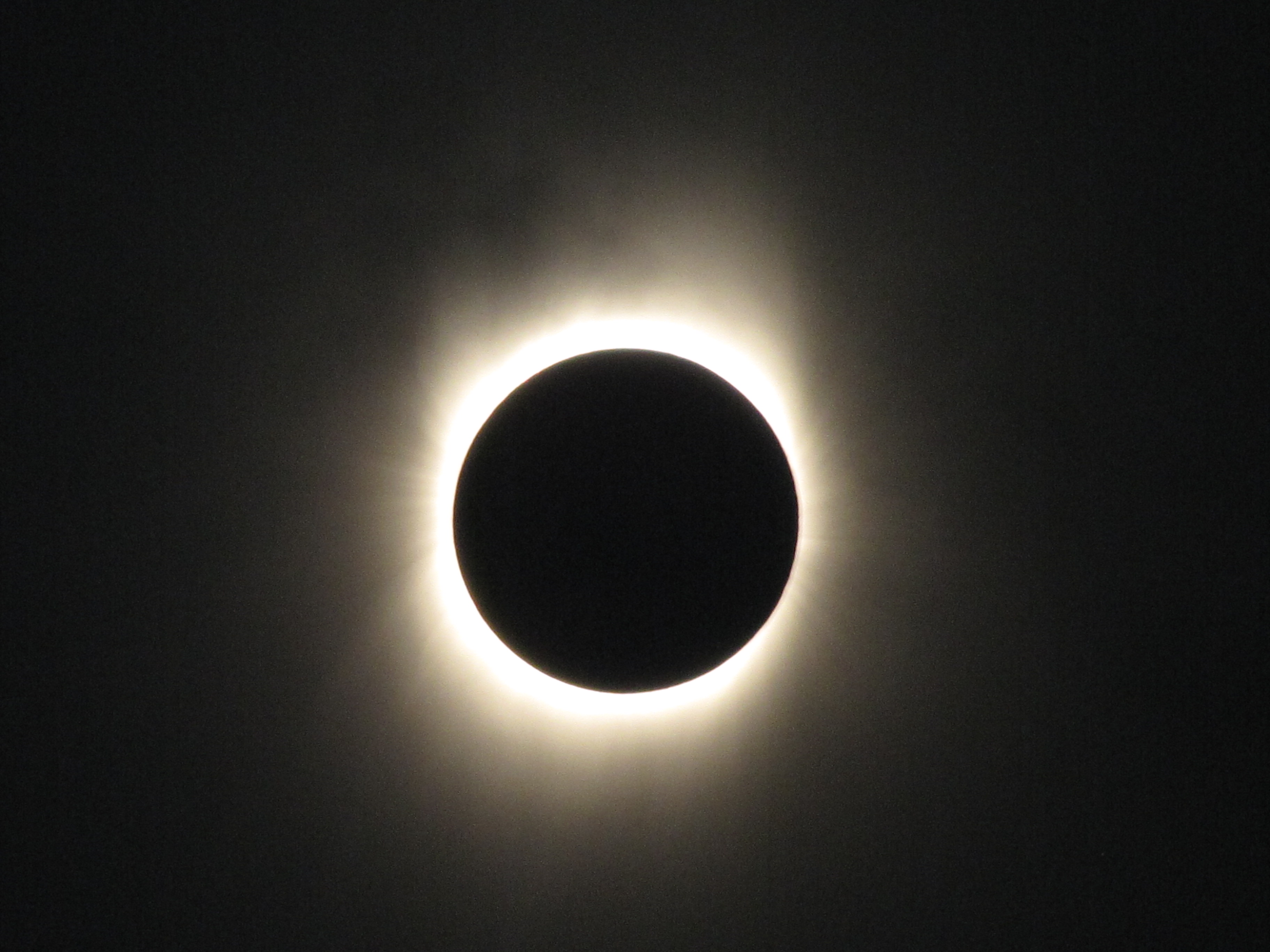
Totality from Varanasi, India

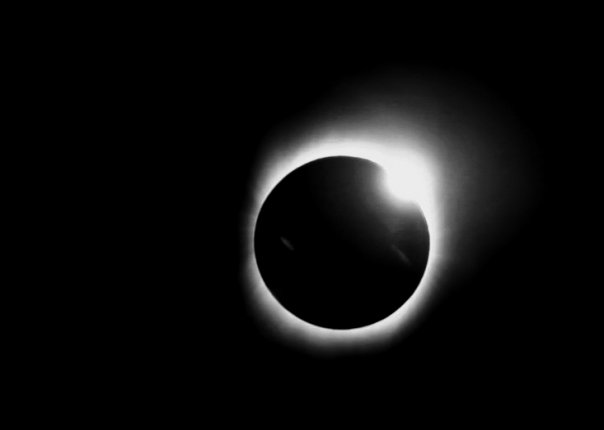
Diamond ring effect in Kurigram District, Bangladesh

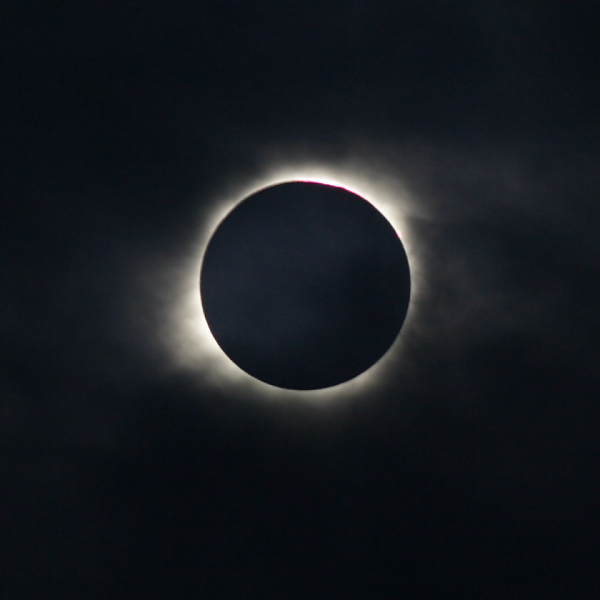
Totality from Panchagarh District, Bangladesh

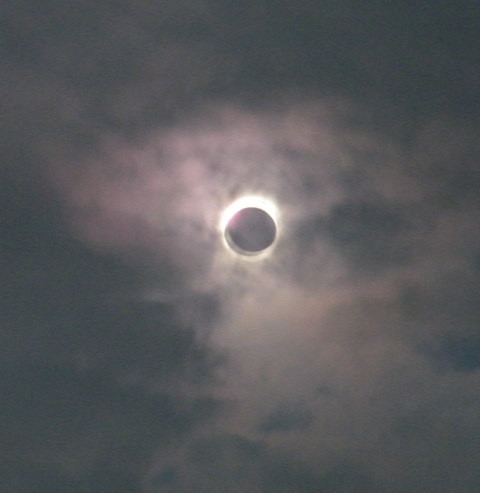
Totality from Thimphu, Bhutan

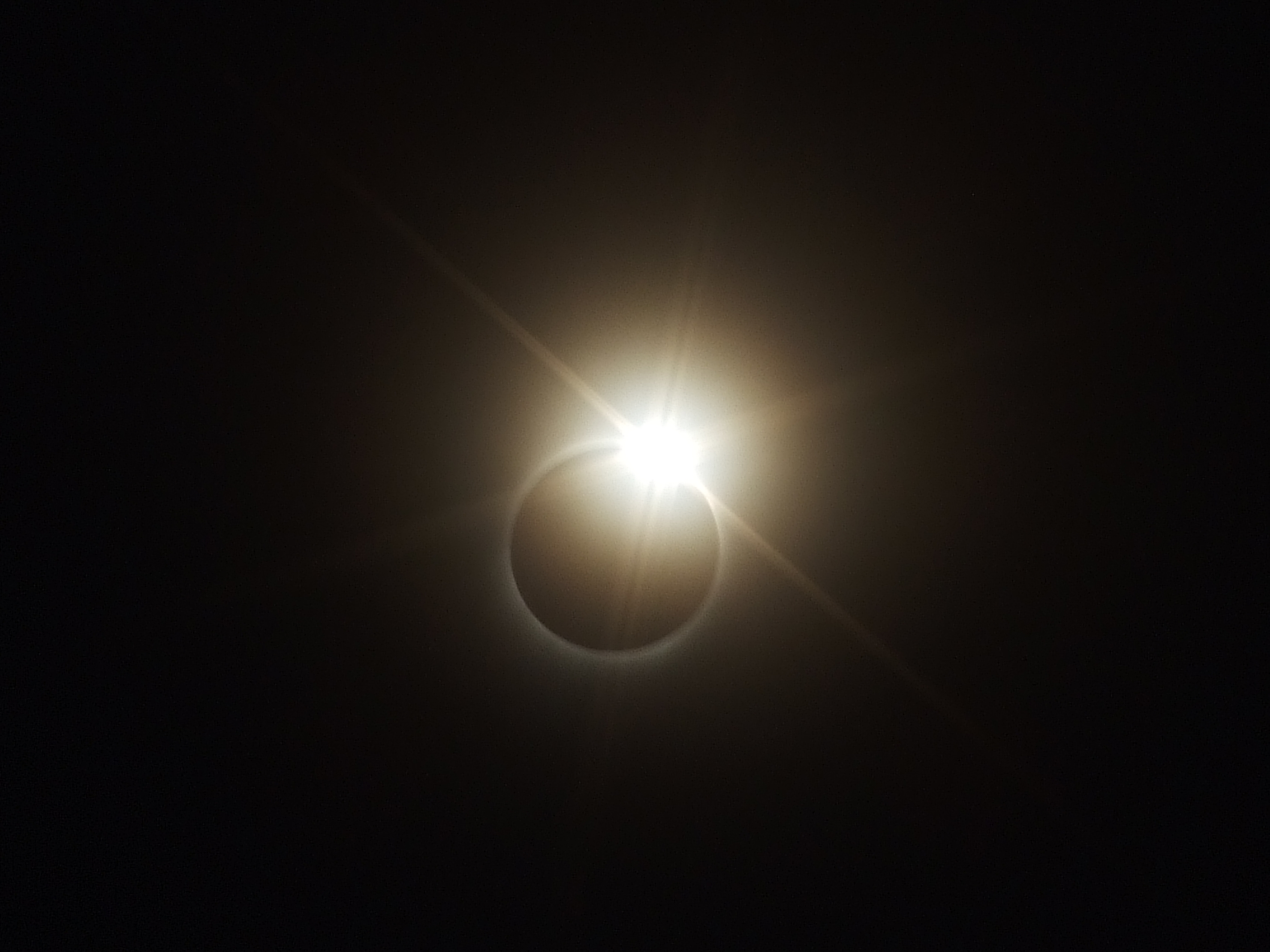
Diamond ring effect in Chongqing, China

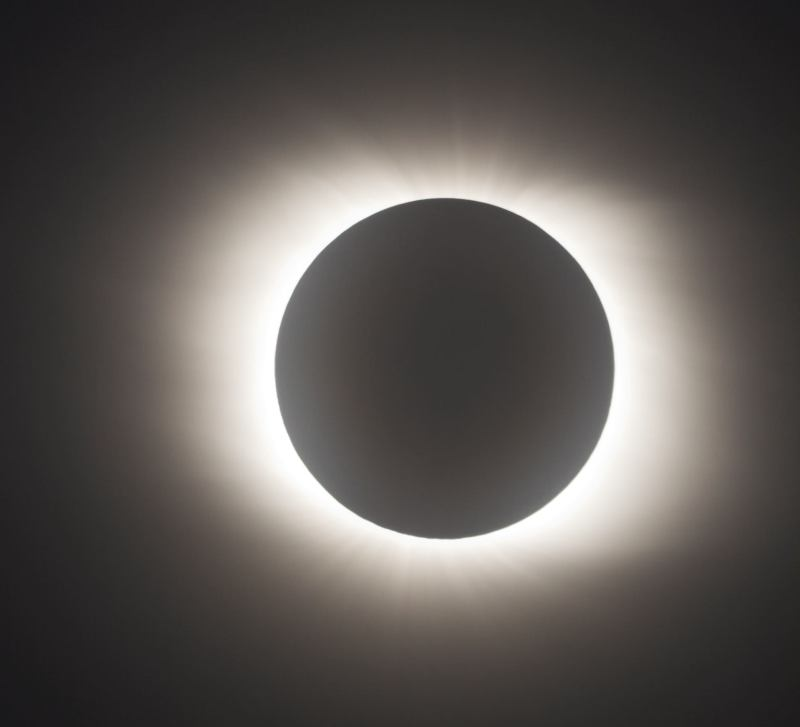
Totality from Hangzhou, China

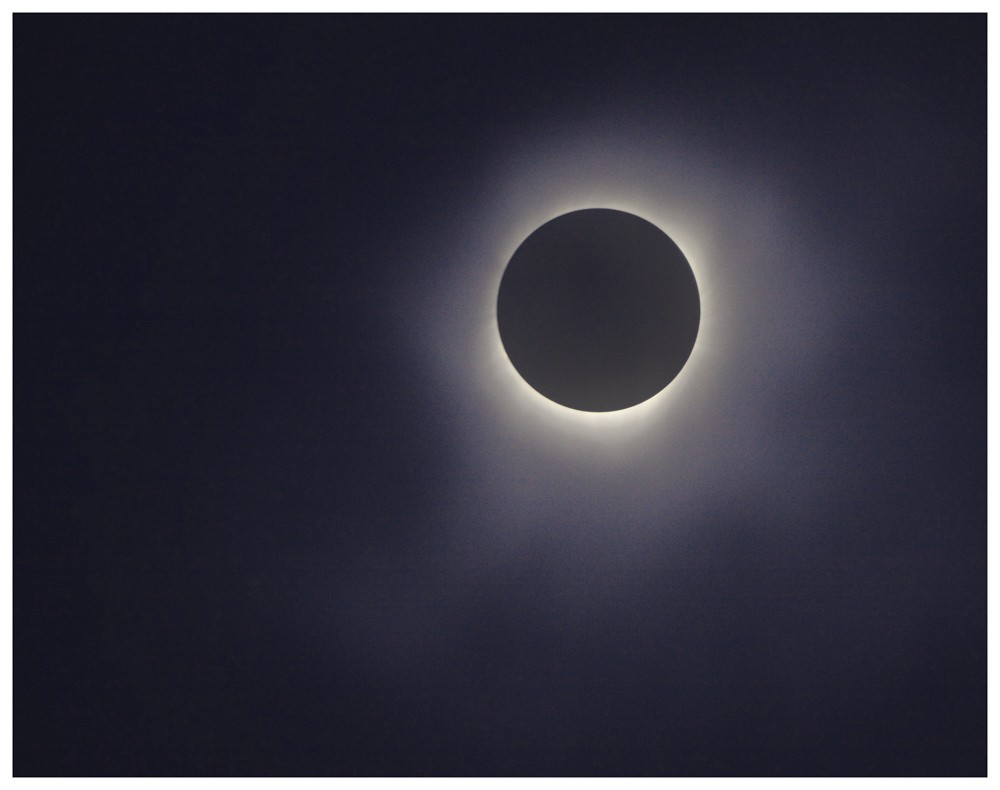
Totality from Wuzhen, China

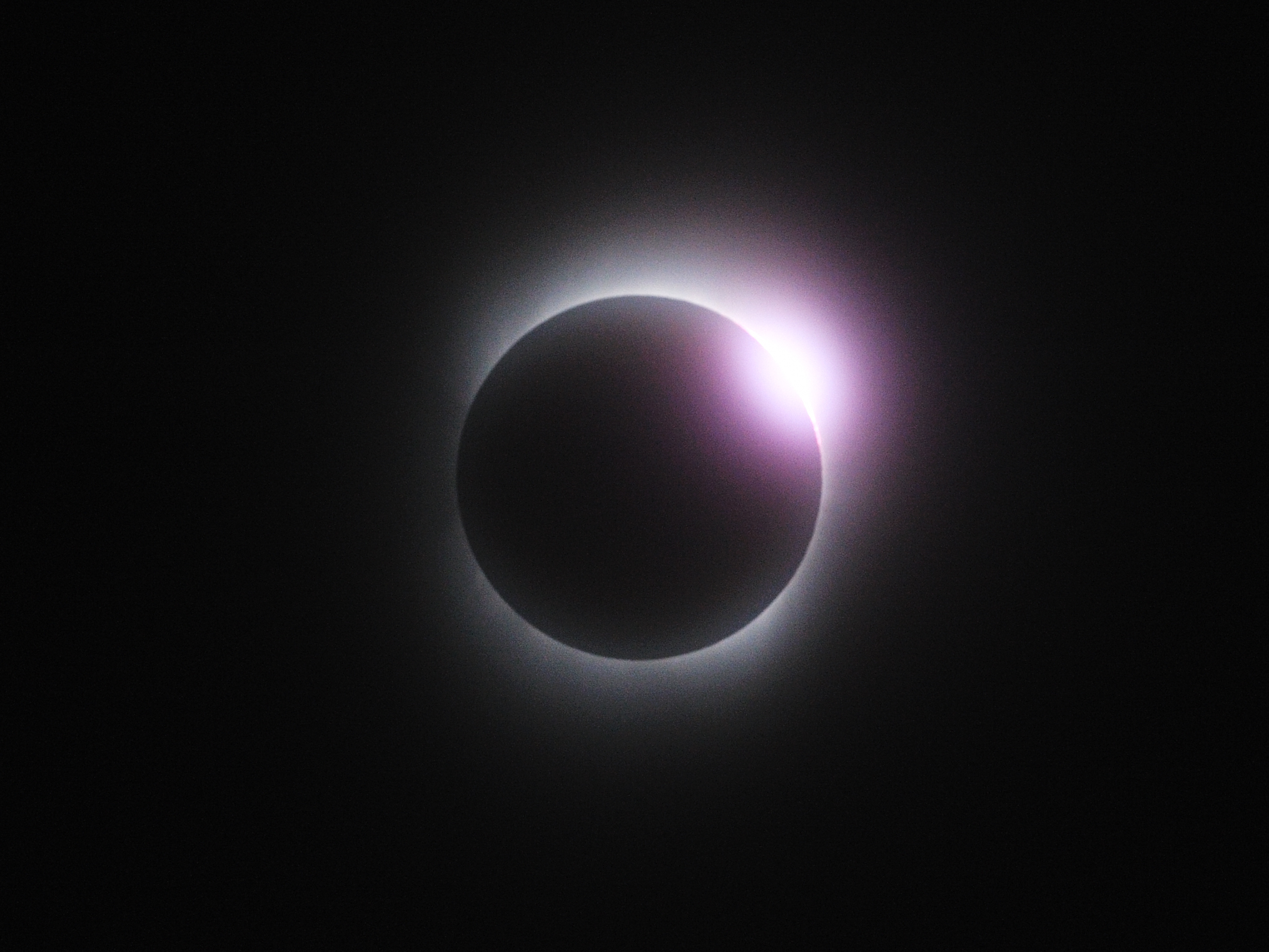
Diamond ring effect in Kikaijima, Japan

=== Partial ===
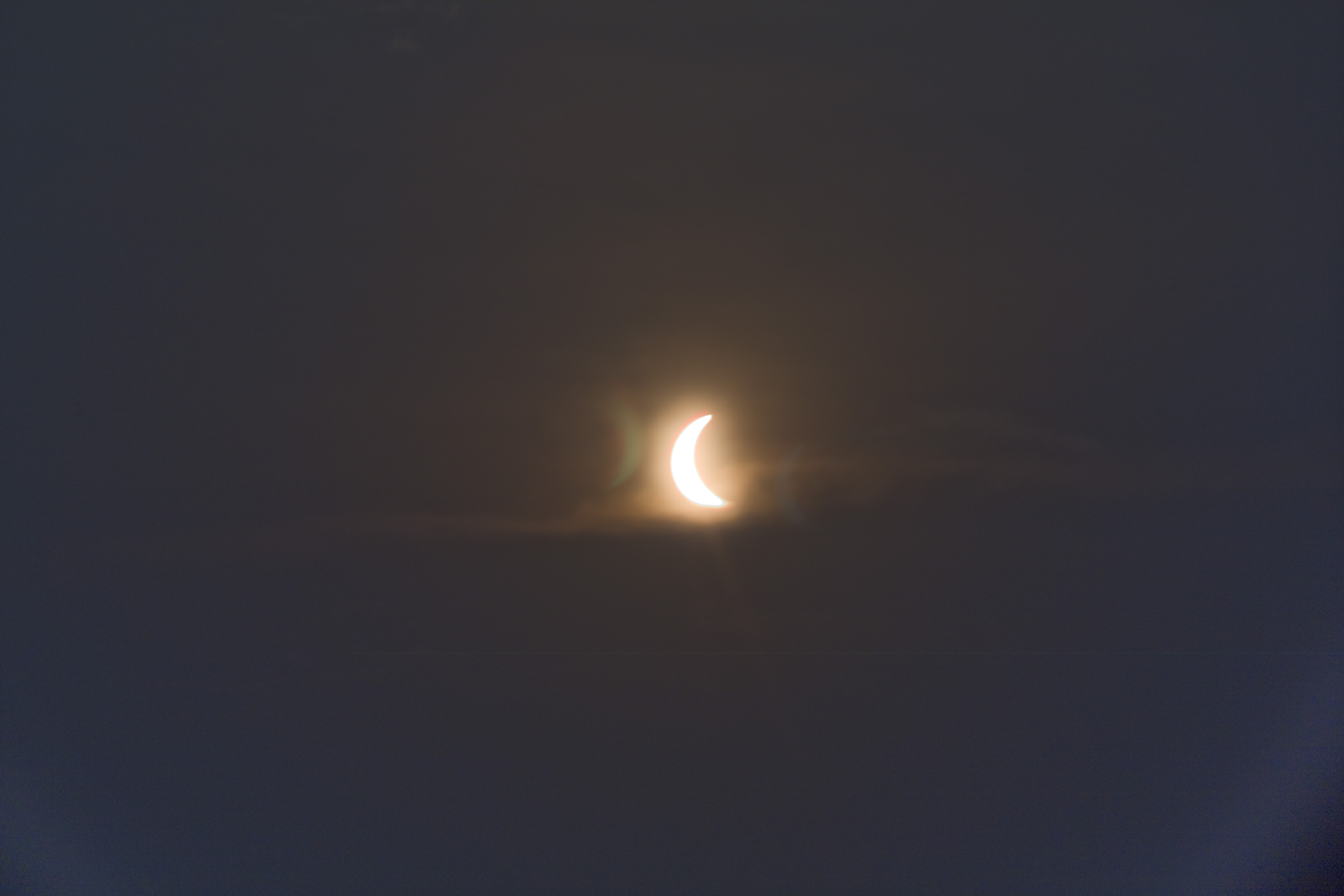
Partial from New Delhi, India

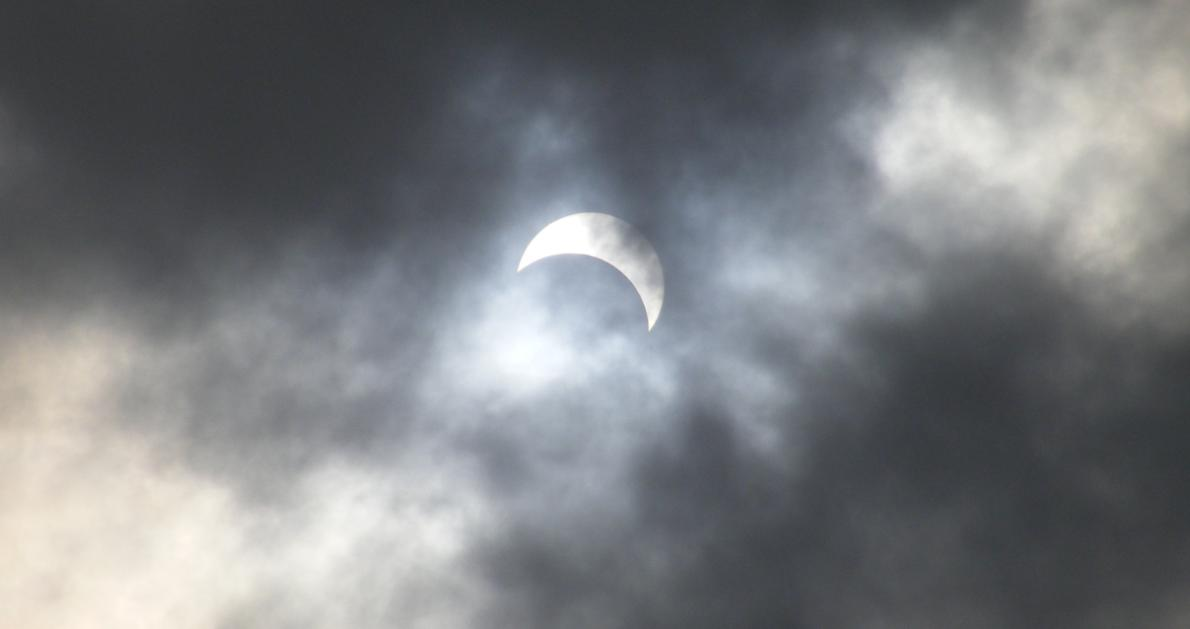
Partial from Kolkata, India

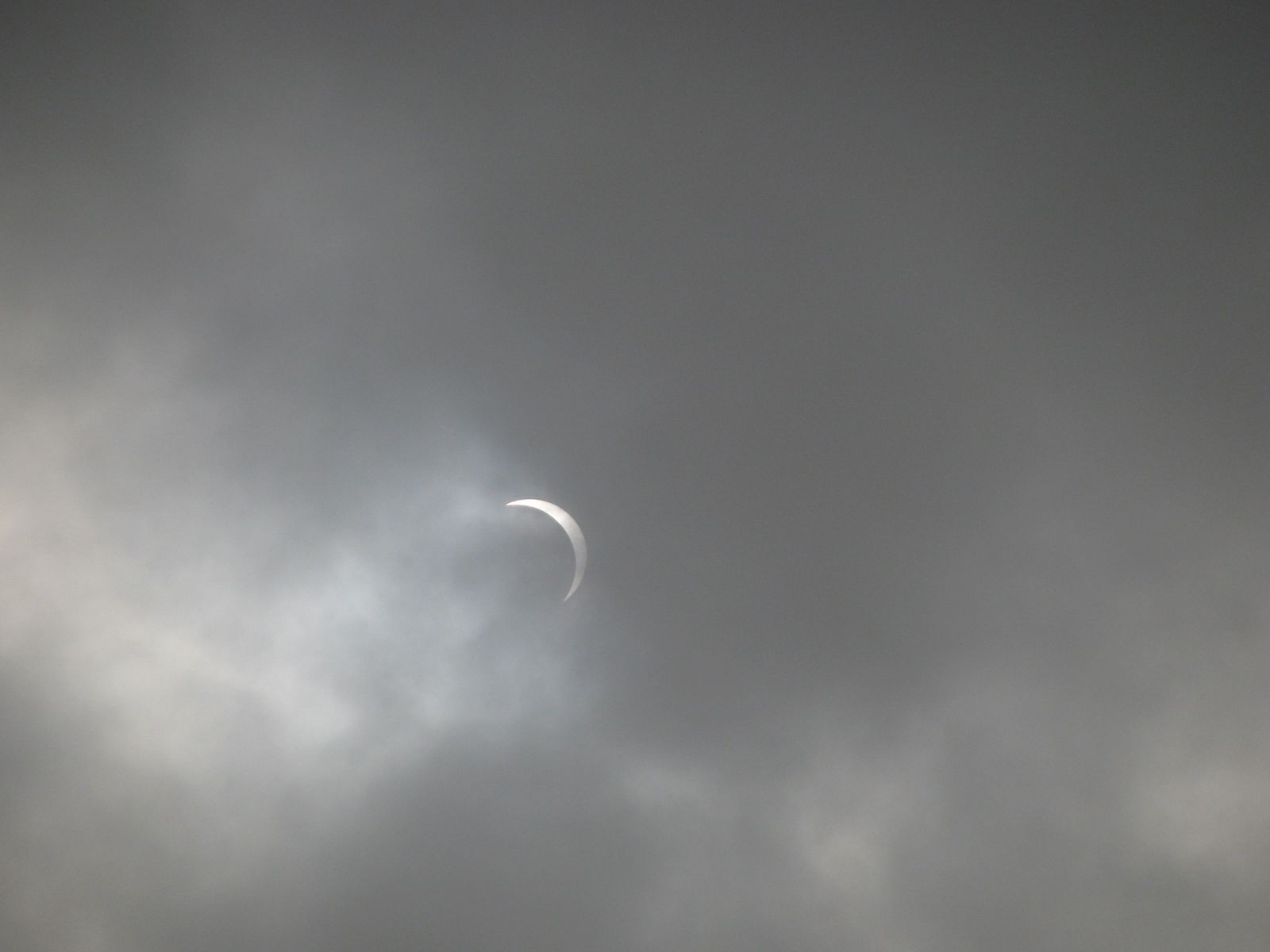
Partial from Kharagpur, India

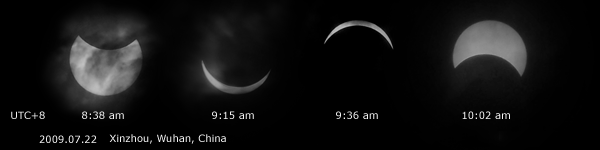
Eclipse progression from Wuhan, China

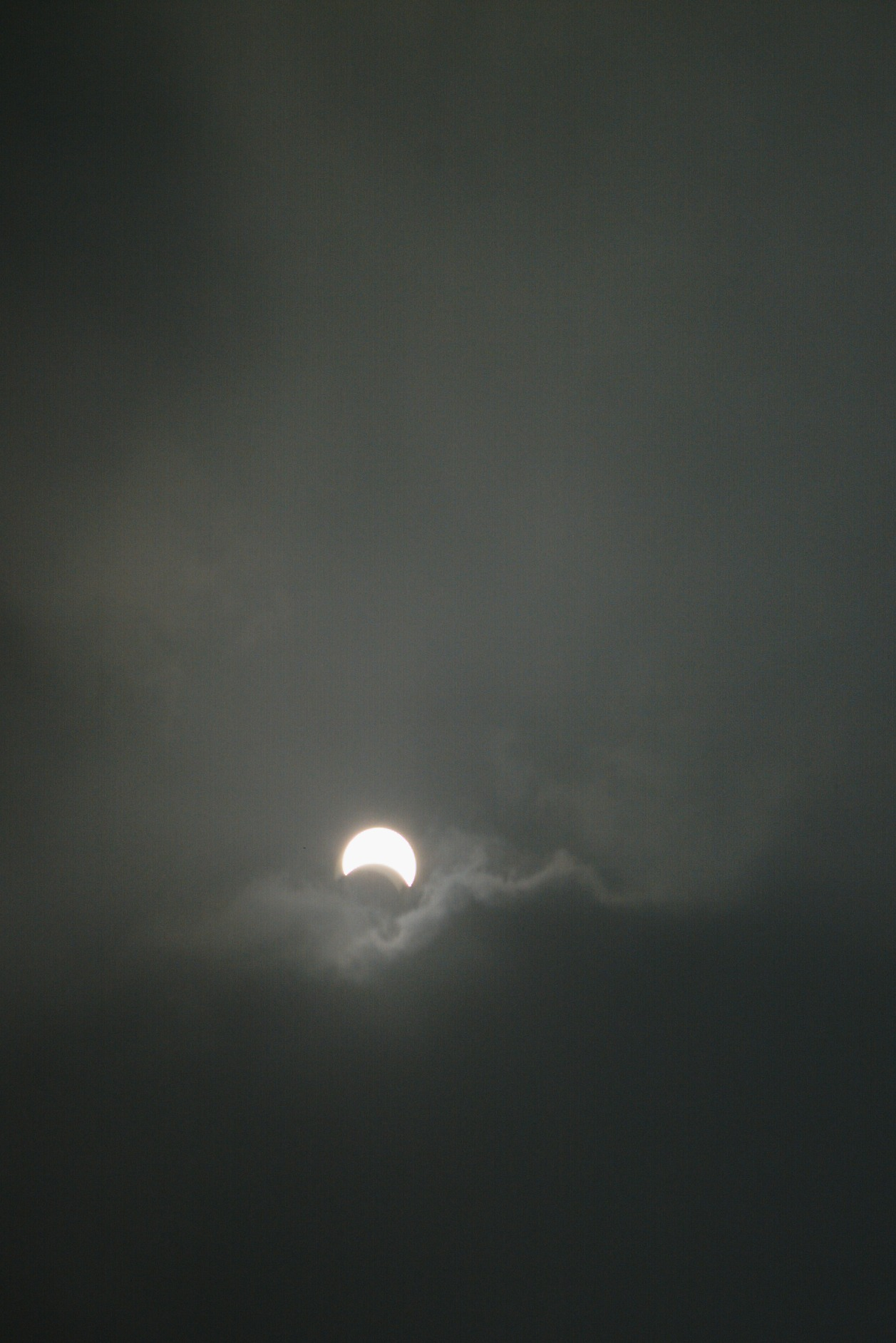
Partial from Beijing, China

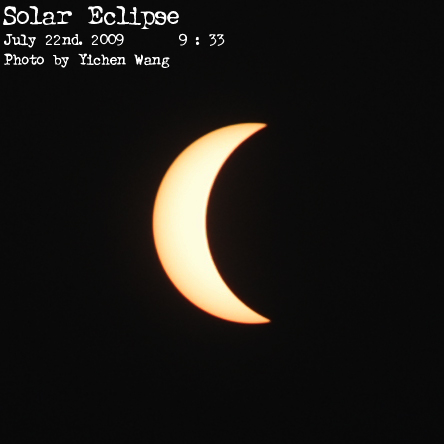
Partial from Tianjin, China

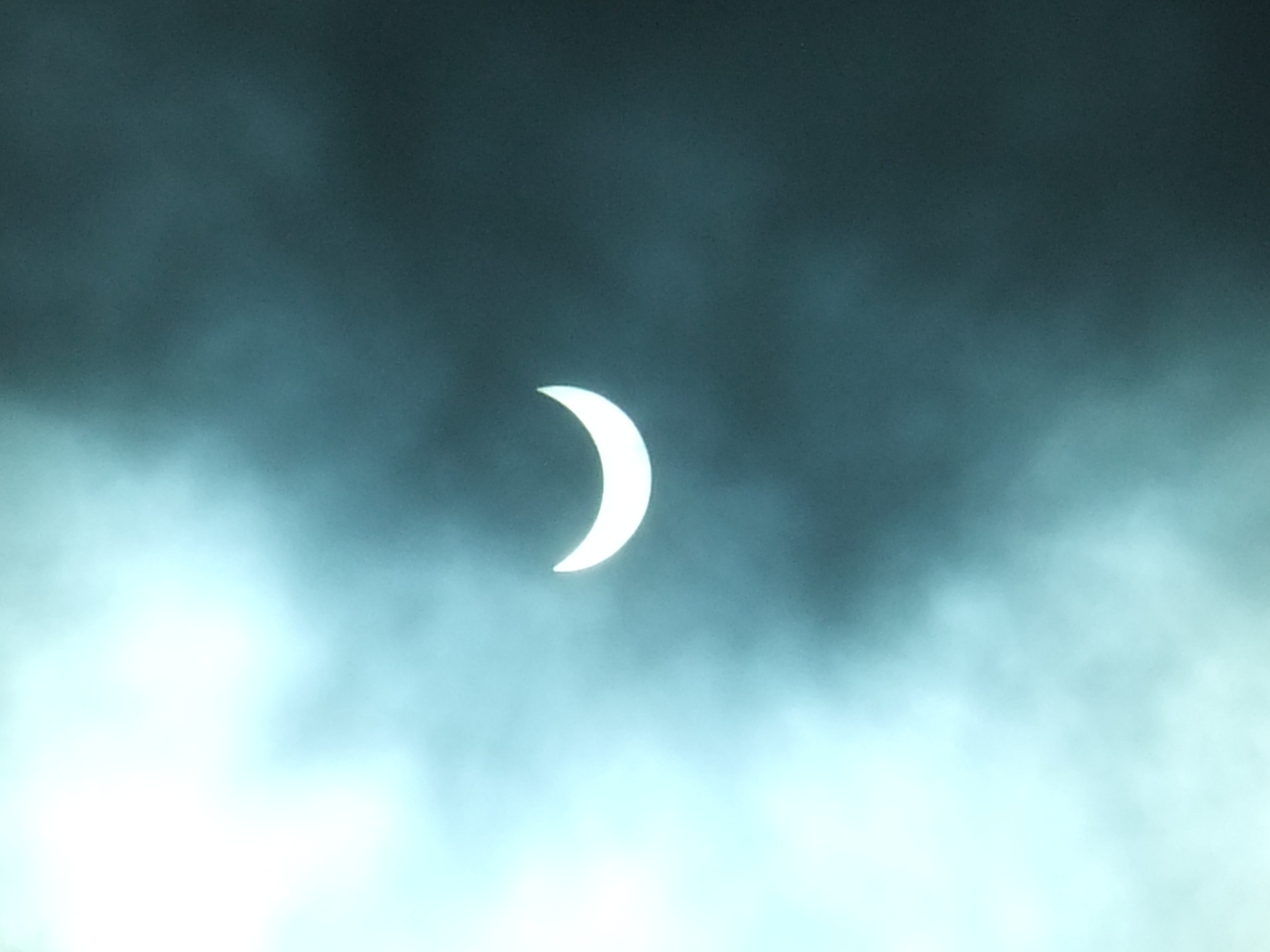
Partial from Sheung Shui, Hong Kong

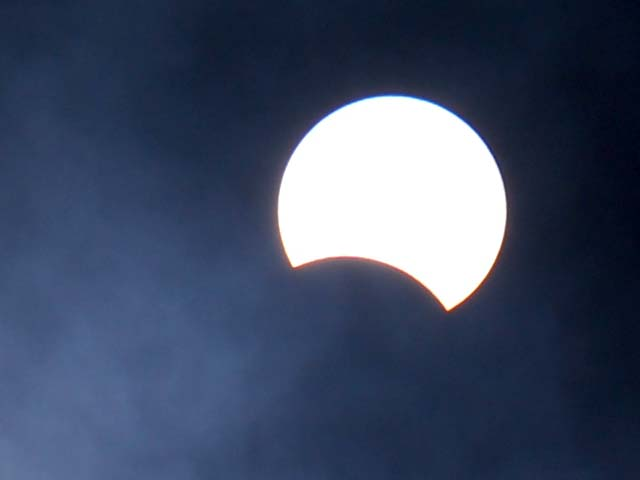
Partial from Quezon City, Philippines

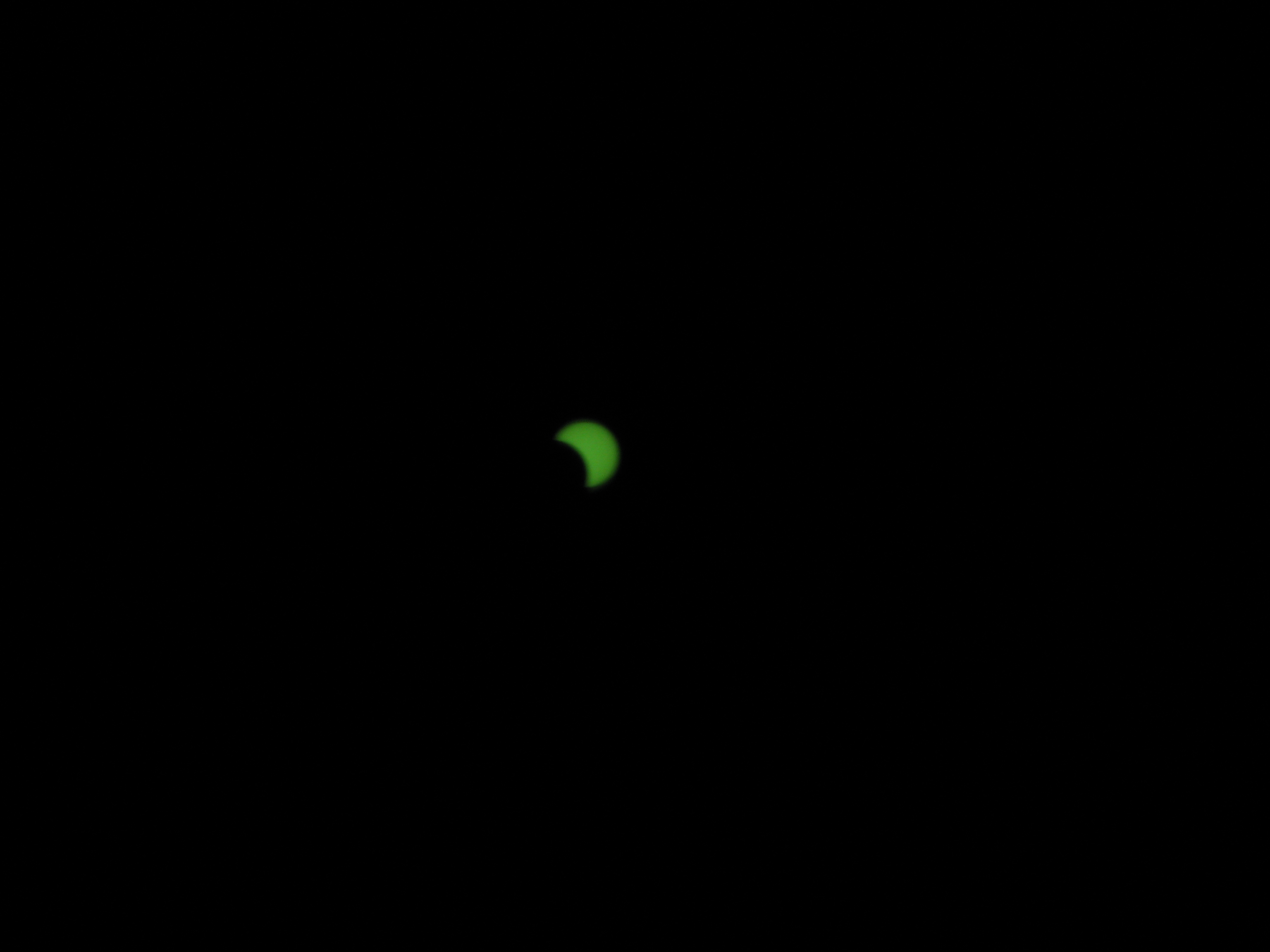
Partial from Makati City, Philippines

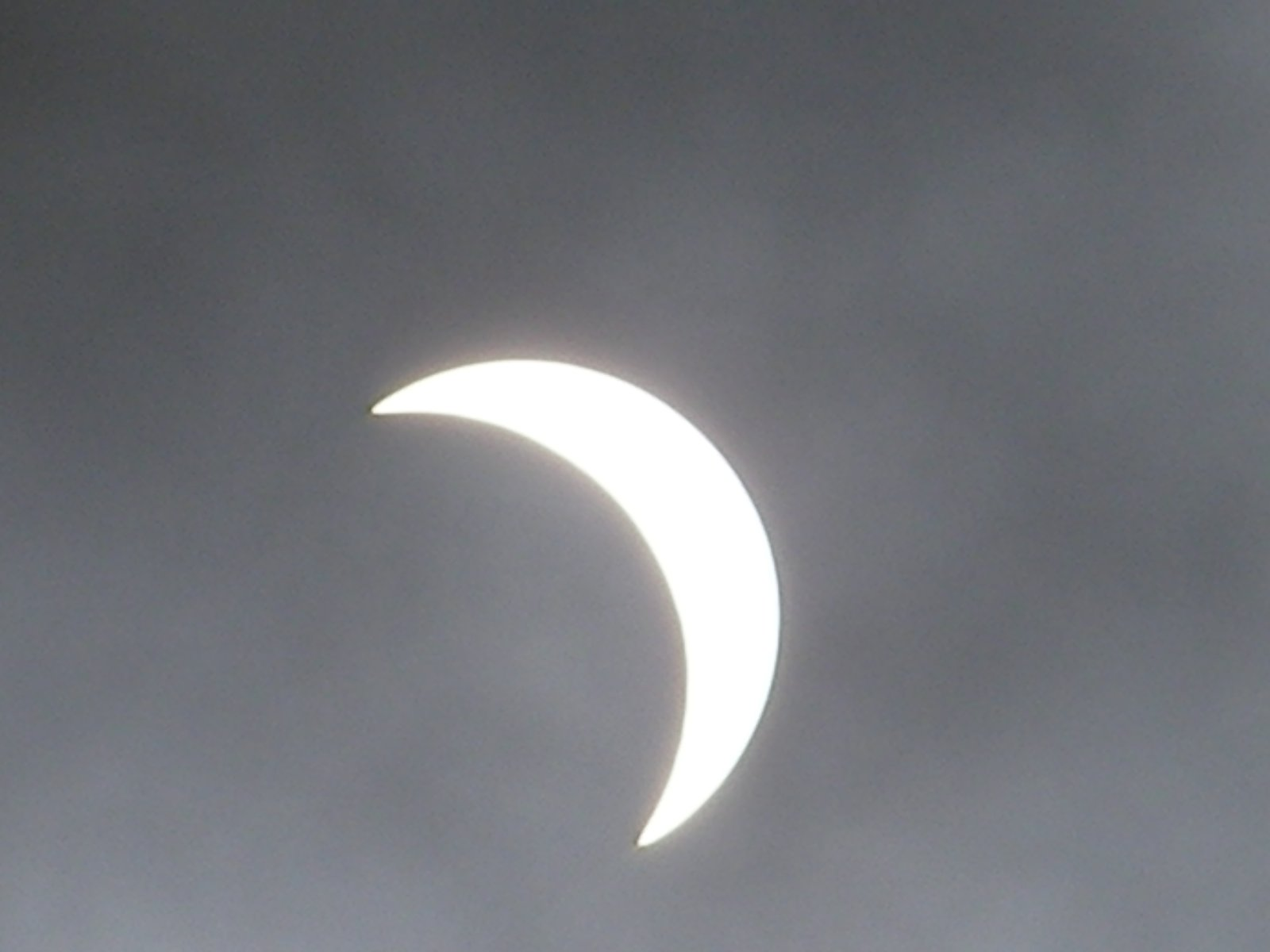
Partial from Taichung, Taiwan

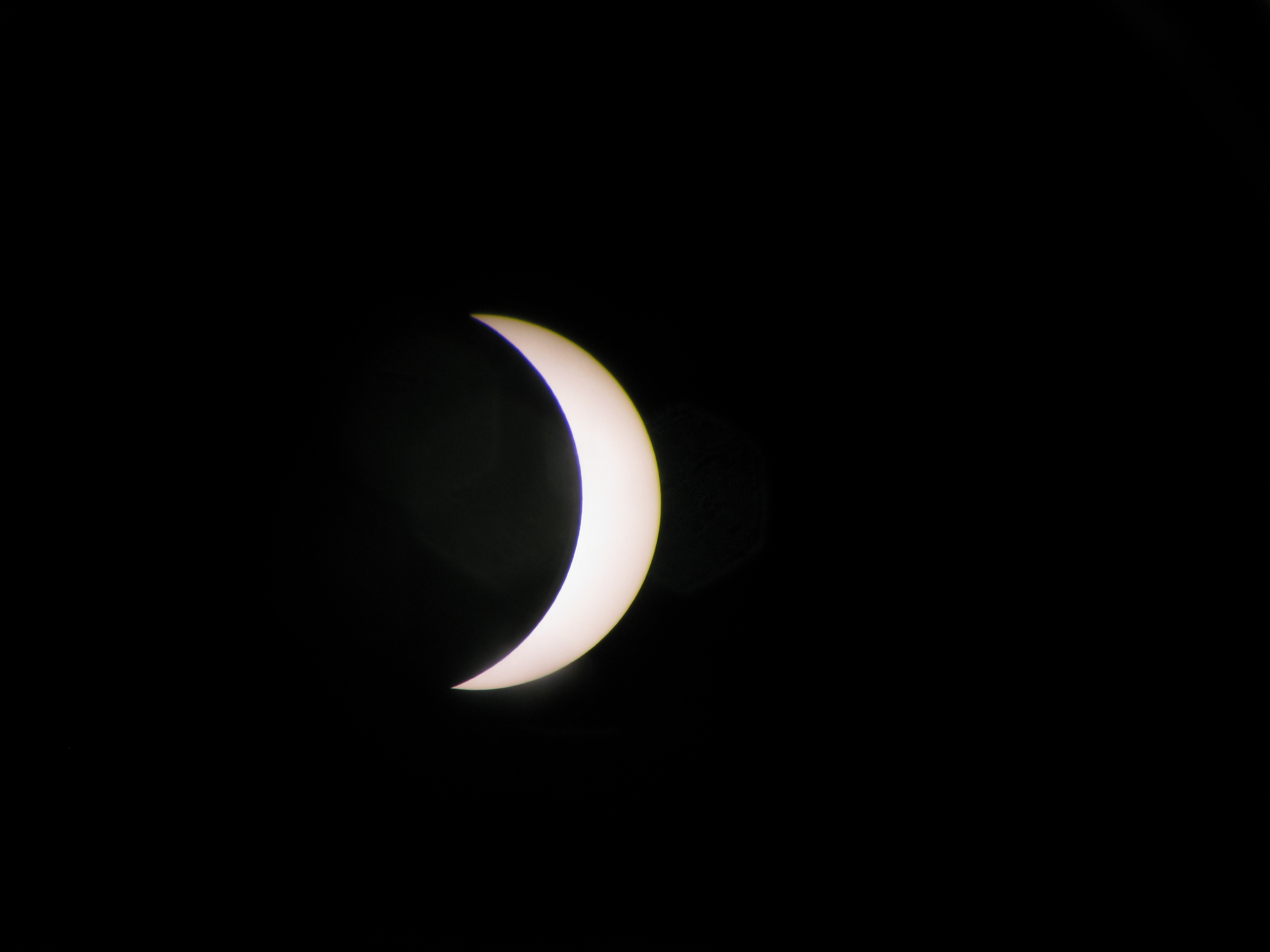
Partial from Incheon, South Korea

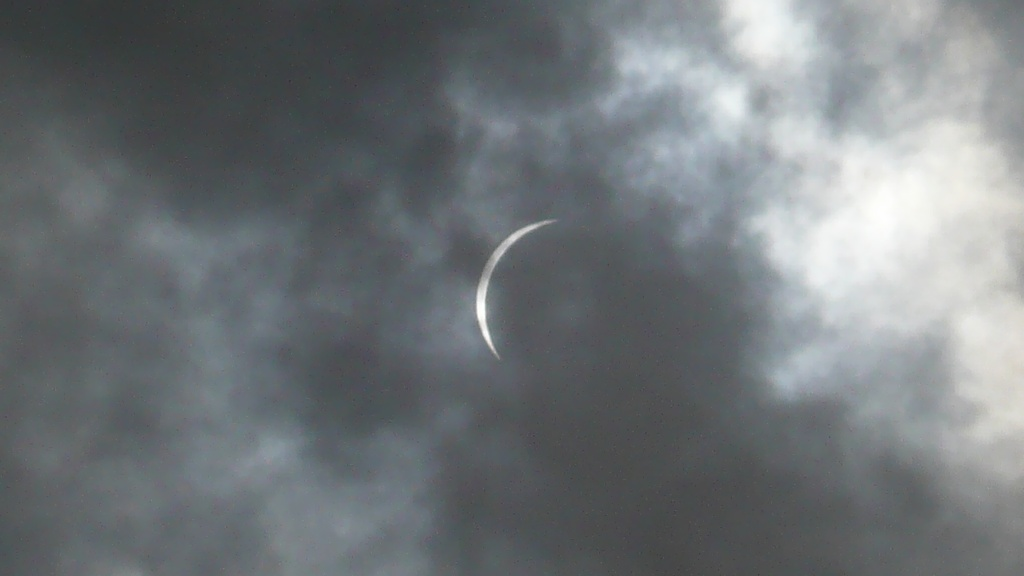
Partial from Miyazaki City, Japan

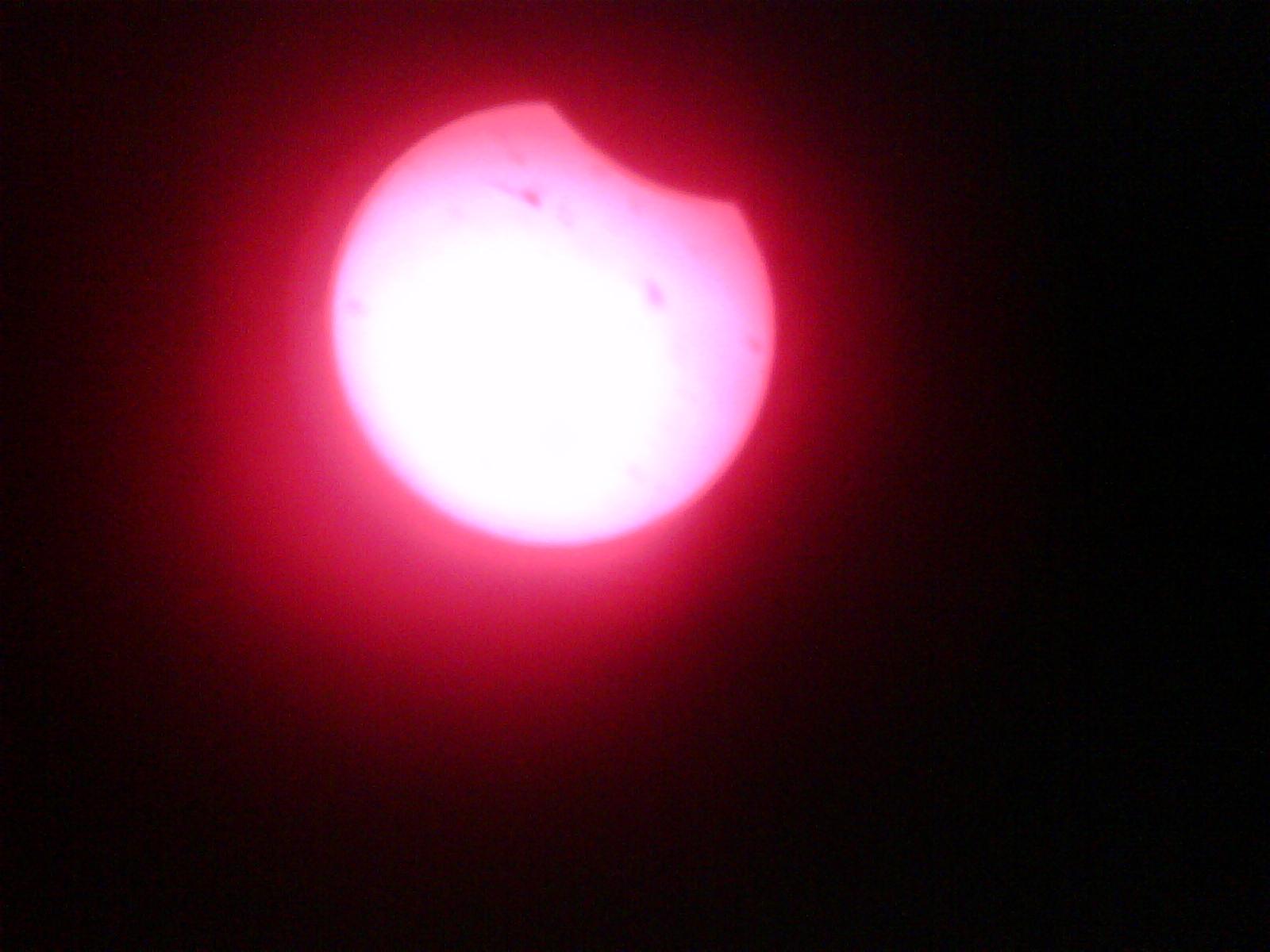
Partial from Honolulu, HI

== View from space ==
Animation of eclipse path

The Terrain Mapping Camera in the Chandrayaan-1 lunar mission was used to image the Earth during the eclipse.

It was also observed by the Japanese geostationary satellite MTSAT:

| 12:30 UT (pre-eclipse) | 1:30 UT | Close up at 1:30 UT |

== Eclipse details ==
Shown below are two tables displaying details about this particular solar eclipse. The first table outlines times at which the Moon's penumbra or umbra attains the specific parameter, and the second table describes various other parameters pertaining to this eclipse.

July 22, 2009 solar eclipse times
| Event | Time (UTC) |
|---|---|
| First penumbral external contact | 2009 July 21 at 23:59:22.1 UTC |
| First umbral external contact | 2009 July 22 at 00:52:20.3 UTC |
| First central line | 2009 July 22 at 00:53:57.4 UTC |
| First umbral internal contact | 2009 July 22 at 00:55:34.5 UTC |
| First penumbral internal contact | 2009 July 22 at 01:48:45.6 UTC |
| Greatest duration | 2009 July 22 at 02:30:22.6 UTC |
| Equatorial conjunction | 2009 July 22 at 02:34:07.5 UTC |
| Ecliptic conjunction | 2009 July 22 at 02:35:42.1 UTC |
| Greatest eclipse | 2009 July 22 at 02:36:24.6 UTC |
| Last penumbral internal contact | 2009 July 22 at 03:24:06.5 UTC |
| Last umbral internal contact | 2009 July 22 at 04:17:16.6 UTC |
| Last central line | 2009 July 22 at 04:18:53.3 UTC |
| Last umbral external contact | 2009 July 22 at 04:20:30.0 UTC |
| Last penumbral external contact | 2009 July 22 at 05:13:28.7 UTC |

July 22, 2009 solar eclipse parameters
| Parameter | Value |
|---|---|
| Eclipse magnitude | 1.07991 |
| Eclipse obscuration | 1.16620 |
| Gamma | 0.06977 |
| Sun right ascension | 08h06m24.1s |
| Sun declination | +20°16'03.0" |
| Sun semi-diameter | 15'44.5" |
| Sun equatorial horizontal parallax | 08.7" |
| Moon right ascension | 08h06m29.6s |
| Moon declination | +20°20'07.0" |
| Moon semi-diameter | 16'42.7" |
| Moon equatorial horizontal parallax | 1°01'19.8" |
| ΔT | 65.9 s |

== Eclipse season ==
This eclipse is part of an eclipse season, a period, roughly every six months, when eclipses occur. Only two (or occasionally three) eclipse seasons occur each year, and each season lasts about 35 days and repeats just short of six months (173 days) later; thus two full eclipse seasons always occur each year. Either two or three eclipses happen each eclipse season. In the sequence below, each eclipse is separated by a fortnight. The first and last eclipse in this sequence is separated by one synodic month.

Eclipse season of July–August 2009
| July 7 Ascending node (full moon) | July 22 Descending node (new moon) | August 6 Ascending node (full moon) |
|---|---|---|
| Penumbral lunar eclipse Lunar Saros 110 | Total solar eclipse Solar Saros 136 | Penumbral lunar eclipse Lunar Saros 148 |

== Related eclipses ==
=== Eclipses in 2009 ===
- An annular solar eclipse on January 26
- A penumbral lunar eclipse on February 9
- A penumbral lunar eclipse on July 7
- A total solar eclipse on July 22
- A penumbral lunar eclipse on August 6
- A partial lunar eclipse on December 31

=== Metonic ===
- Preceded by: Solar eclipse of October 3, 2005
- Followed by: Solar eclipse of May 10, 2013

=== Tzolkinex ===
- Preceded by: Solar eclipse of June 10, 2002
- Followed by: Solar eclipse of September 1, 2016

=== Half-Saros ===
- Preceded by: Lunar eclipse of July 16, 2000
- Followed by: Lunar eclipse of July 27, 2018

=== Tritos ===
- Preceded by: Solar eclipse of August 22, 1998
- Followed by: Solar eclipse of June 21, 2020

=== Solar Saros 136 ===
- Preceded by: Solar eclipse of July 11, 1991
- Followed by: Solar eclipse of August 2, 2027

=== Inex ===
- Preceded by: Solar eclipse of August 10, 1980
- Followed by: Solar eclipse of July 2, 2038

=== Triad ===
- Preceded by: Solar eclipse of September 21, 1922
- Followed by: Solar eclipse of May 22, 2096

=== Solar eclipses of 2008–2011 ===
This eclipse is a member of a semester series. An eclipse in a semester series of solar eclipses repeats approximately every 177 days and 4 hours (a semester) at alternating nodes of the Moon's orbit.

The partial solar eclipses on June 1, 2011 and November 25, 2011 occur in the next lunar year eclipse set.

Solar eclipse series sets from 2008 to 2011
| Ascending node | | | Descending node | | |
| Saros | Map | Gamma | Saros | Map | Gamma |
| 121 Partial in Christchurch, New Zealand | February 7, 2008 Annular | −0.95701 | 126 Totality in Kumul, Xinjiang, China | August 1, 2008 Total | 0.83070 |
| 131 Annularity in Palangka Raya, Indonesia | January 26, 2009 Annular | −0.28197 | 136 Totality in Kurigram District, Bangladesh | July 22, 2009 Total | 0.06977 |
| 141 Annularity in Jinan, Shandong, China | January 15, 2010 Annular | 0.40016 | 146 Totality in Hao, French Polynesia | July 11, 2010 Total | −0.67877 |
| 151 Partial in Poland | January 4, 2011 Partial | 1.06265 | 156 | July 1, 2011 Partial | −1.49171 |

=== Saros 136 ===
This eclipse is a part of Saros series 136, repeating every 18 years, 11 days, and containing 71 events. The series started with a partial solar eclipse on June 14, 1360. It contains annular eclipses from September 8, 1504 through November 12, 1594; hybrid eclipses from November 22, 1612 through January 17, 1703; and total eclipses from January 27, 1721 through May 13, 2496. The series ends at member 71 as a partial eclipse on July 30, 2622. Its eclipses are tabulated in three columns; every third eclipse in the same column is one exeligmos apart, so they all cast shadows over approximately the same parts of the Earth.

The longest duration of annularity was produced by member 9 at 32 seconds on September 8, 1504, and the longest duration of totality was produced by member 34 at 7 minutes, 7.74 seconds on June 20, 1955. All eclipses in this series occur at the Moon’s descending node of orbit.

Series members 26–47 occur between 1801 and 2200:
| 26 | 27 | 28 |
|---|---|---|
| March 24, 1811 | April 3, 1829 | April 15, 1847 |
| 29 | 30 | 31 |
| April 25, 1865 | May 6, 1883 | May 18, 1901 |
| 32 | 33 | 34 |
| May 29, 1919 | June 8, 1937 | June 20, 1955 |
| 35 | 36 | 37 |
| June 30, 1973 | July 11, 1991 | July 22, 2009 |
| 38 | 39 | 40 |
| August 2, 2027 | August 12, 2045 | August 24, 2063 |
| 41 | 42 | 43 |
| September 3, 2081 | September 14, 2099 | September 26, 2117 |
| 44 | 45 | 46 |
| October 7, 2135 | October 17, 2153 | October 29, 2171 |
47
November 8, 2189

=== Metonic series ===
The metonic series repeats eclipses every 19 years (6939.69 days), lasting about 5 cycles. Eclipses occur in nearly the same calendar date. In addition, the octon subseries repeats 1/5 of that or every 3.8 years (1387.94 days). All eclipses in this table occur at the Moon's descending node.

21 eclipse events between July 22, 1971 and July 22, 2047
| July 22 | May 9–11 | February 26–27 | December 14–15 | October 2–3 |
| 116 | 118 | 120 | 122 | 124 |
|---|---|---|---|---|
| July 22, 1971 | May 11, 1975 | February 26, 1979 | December 15, 1982 | October 3, 1986 |
| 126 | 128 | 130 | 132 | 134 |
| July 22, 1990 | May 10, 1994 | February 26, 1998 | December 14, 2001 | October 3, 2005 |
| 136 | 138 | 140 | 142 | 144 |
| July 22, 2009 | May 10, 2013 | February 26, 2017 | December 14, 2020 | October 2, 2024 |
| 146 | 148 | 150 | 152 | 154 |
| July 22, 2028 | May 9, 2032 | February 27, 2036 | December 15, 2039 | October 3, 2043 |
156
July 22, 2047

=== Tritos series ===
This eclipse is a part of a tritos cycle, repeating at alternating nodes every 135 synodic months (≈ 3986.63 days, or 11 years minus 1 month). Their appearance and longitude are irregular due to a lack of synchronization with the anomalistic month (period of perigee), but groupings of 3 tritos cycles (≈ 33 years minus 3 months) come close (≈ 434.044 anomalistic months), so eclipses are similar in these groupings.

Series members between 1801 and 2200
| March 4, 1802 (Saros 117) | February 1, 1813 (Saros 118) | January 1, 1824 (Saros 119) | November 30, 1834 (Saros 120) | October 30, 1845 (Saros 121) |
| September 29, 1856 (Saros 122) | August 29, 1867 (Saros 123) | July 29, 1878 (Saros 124) | June 28, 1889 (Saros 125) | May 28, 1900 (Saros 126) |
| April 28, 1911 (Saros 127) | March 28, 1922 (Saros 128) | February 24, 1933 (Saros 129) | January 25, 1944 (Saros 130) | December 25, 1954 (Saros 131) |
| November 23, 1965 (Saros 132) | October 23, 1976 (Saros 133) | September 23, 1987 (Saros 134) | August 22, 1998 (Saros 135) | July 22, 2009 (Saros 136) |
| June 21, 2020 (Saros 137) | May 21, 2031 (Saros 138) | April 20, 2042 (Saros 139) | March 20, 2053 (Saros 140) | February 17, 2064 (Saros 141) |
| January 16, 2075 (Saros 142) | December 16, 2085 (Saros 143) | November 15, 2096 (Saros 144) | October 16, 2107 (Saros 145) | September 15, 2118 (Saros 146) |
| August 15, 2129 (Saros 147) | July 14, 2140 (Saros 148) | June 14, 2151 (Saros 149) | May 14, 2162 (Saros 150) | April 12, 2173 (Saros 151) |
| March 12, 2184 (Saros 152) | February 10, 2195 (Saros 153) | | | |

=== Inex series ===
This eclipse is a part of the long period inex cycle, repeating at alternating nodes, every 358 synodic months (≈ 10,571.95 days, or 29 years minus 20 days). Their appearance and longitude are irregular due to a lack of synchronization with the anomalistic month (period of perigee). However, groupings of 3 inex cycles (≈ 87 years minus 2 months) comes close (≈ 1,151.02 anomalistic months), so eclipses are similar in these groupings.

Series members between 1801 and 2200
| December 10, 1806 (Saros 129) | November 20, 1835 (Saros 130) | October 30, 1864 (Saros 131) |
| October 9, 1893 (Saros 132) | September 21, 1922 (Saros 133) | September 1, 1951 (Saros 134) |
| August 10, 1980 (Saros 135) | July 22, 2009 (Saros 136) | July 2, 2038 (Saros 137) |
| June 11, 2067 (Saros 138) | May 22, 2096 (Saros 139) | May 3, 2125 (Saros 140) |
| April 12, 2154 (Saros 141) | March 23, 2183 (Saros 142) | |
